= Orson Welles =

American actor and filmmaker (1915–1985)

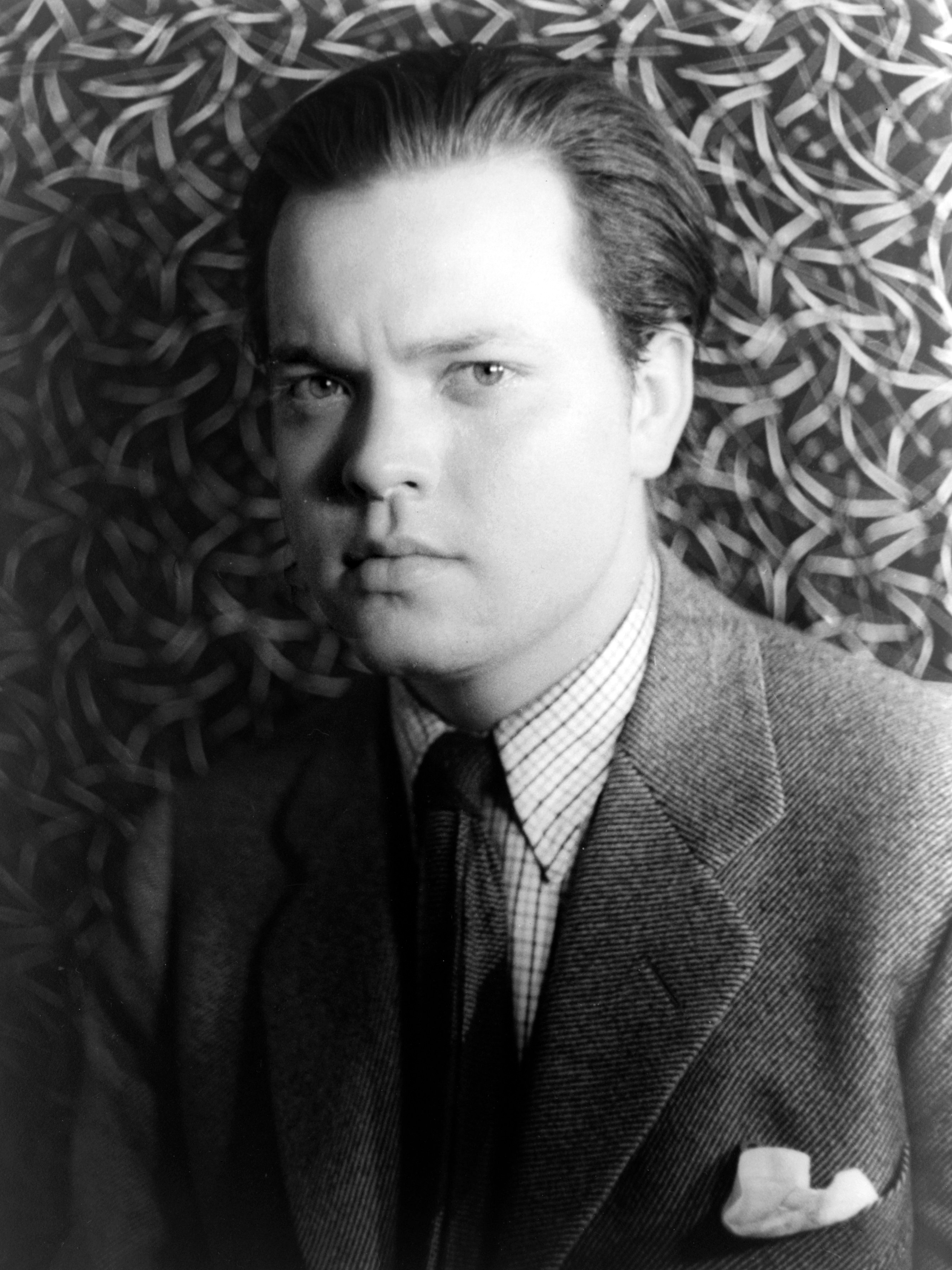
- Welles in 1937
- Born: George Orson Welles; May 6, 1915; Kenosha, Wisconsin, U.S.
- Died: October 10, 1985 (aged 70); Los Angeles, California, U.S.
- Occupations: Film director; producer; screenwriter; actor
- Years active: 1931–1985
- Spouses: Virginia Nicolson (m. 1934; div. 1940) Rita Hayworth (m. 1943; div. 1947) Paola Mori (m. 1955)
- Partners: Dolores del Río (1940–1943); Oja Kodar (from 1966)
- Children: 3, including Beatrice

George Orson Welles (May 6, 1915 – October 10, 1985) was an American actor and filmmaker. Remembered for his innovative work in film, radio, and theatre, he is considered among the greatest and most influential filmmakers of all time.

Aged 21, Welles directed high-profile stage productions for the Federal Theatre Project in New York City—starting with a celebrated 1936 adaptation of Macbeth with an African-American cast, and ending with the political musical The Cradle Will Rock in 1937. He and John Houseman then founded the Mercury Theatre, an independent repertory theatre company that presented Broadway productions through 1941—beginning with a modern, politically charged Caesar (1937) and ending with the premiere of Richard Wright's Native Son. In 1938, his radio anthology series The Mercury Theatre on the Air gave Welles the platform to find international fame as the director and narrator of a radio adaptation of H. G. Wells's novel The War of the Worlds, which caused some listeners to believe a Martian invasion was occurring. The event rocketed the 23-year-old to notoriety, drawing offers from Hollywood studios and culminating in what is regarded as the greatest contract ever offered to a filmmaker.

His first film was Citizen Kane (1941), which he co-wrote, produced, directed and starred in as the title character, Charles Foster Kane. It has been consistently ranked as one of the greatest films ever made. He directed 12 other features, the most acclaimed of which include The Magnificent Ambersons (1942), The Lady from Shanghai (1947), Othello (1951), Touch of Evil (1958), The Trial (1962), and Chimes at Midnight (1966). His distinctive directorial style featured layered and nonlinear narrative forms, dramatic lighting, unusual camera angles, sound techniques borrowed from radio, deep focus shots and long takes. Welles struggled for creative control while working within the studio system and later worked as an independent filmmaker, though he often failed to secure financing for his projects. He also acted in other directors' films, playing Rochester in Jane Eyre (1943), Harry Lime in The Third Man (1949), and Cardinal Wolsey in A Man for All Seasons (1966).

Welles has been praised as "the ultimate auteur". He received an Academy Award and three Grammy Awards among other honors and accolades such as the Golden Lion in 1947, the Palme D'Or in 1952, the Academy Honorary Award in 1970, the AFI Life Achievement Award in 1975, and the British Film Institute Fellowship in 1983. British Film Institute polls in 2002 voted him the greatest film director ever. In 2018, he was included in the list of the greatest Hollywood actors of all time by The Daily Telegraph.

== Early life ==
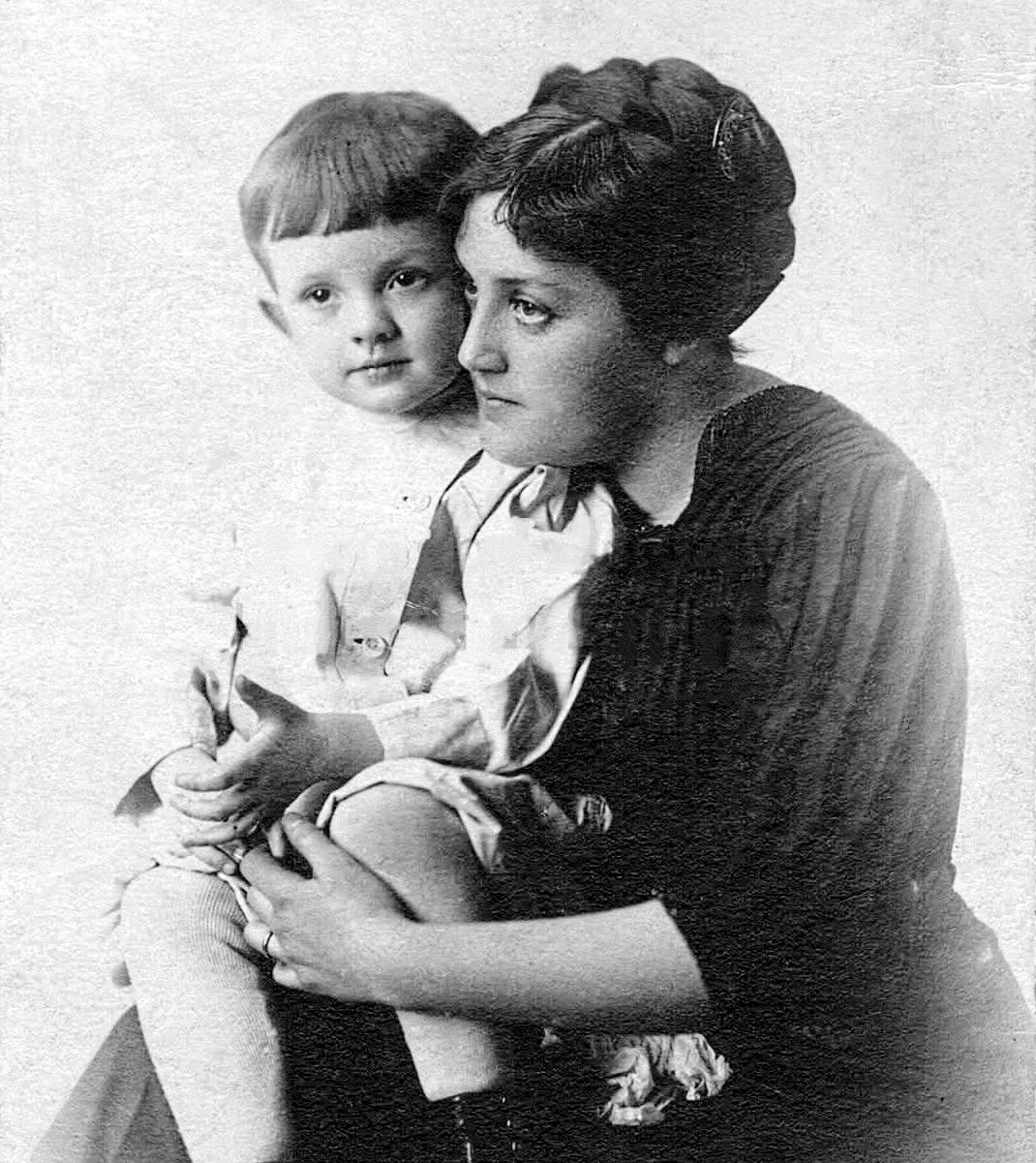
Beatrice Ives Welles with her son Richard Ives Welles (1910)

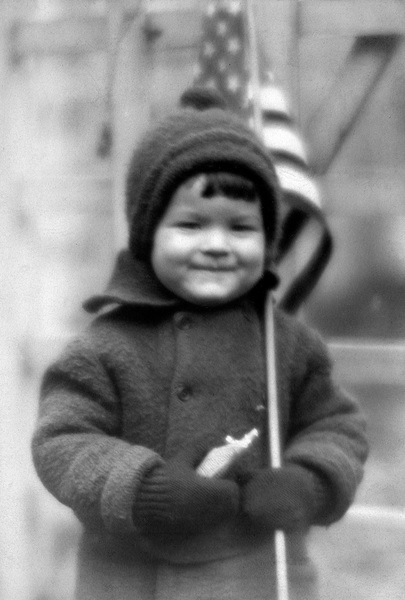
Orson Welles at age three (1918)

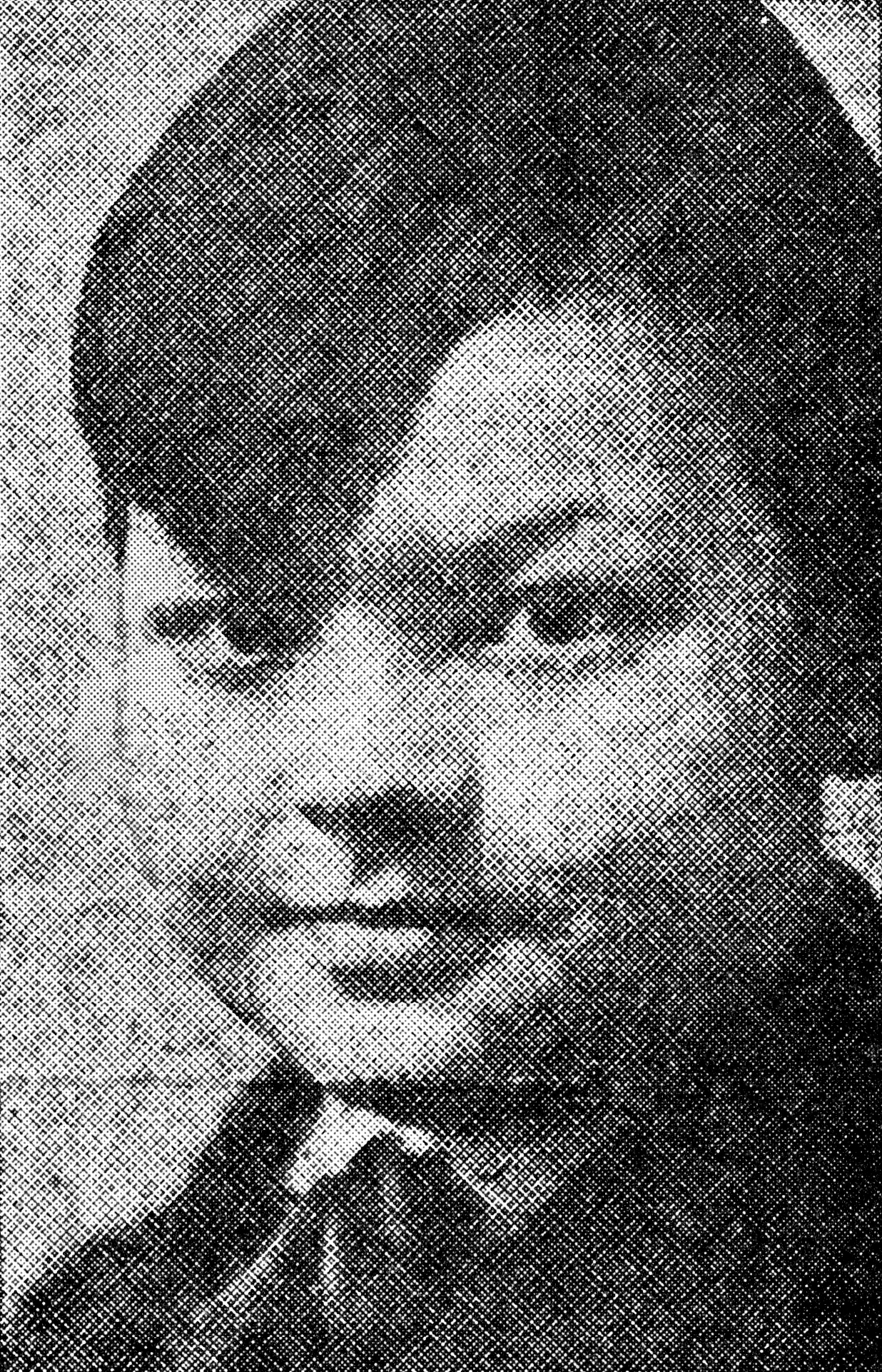
Newspaper photo of Welles in 1926: "Cartoonist, Actor, Poet and only 10"

Orson Welles Birthplace in Kenosha, Wisconsin, in 2026

George Orson Welles was born May 6, 1915, in Kenosha, Wisconsin, the younger of two sons of Richard Head Welles (Note: Richard H. Welles had changed the spelling of his surname by the time of the 1900 Federal Census, when he was living at Rudolphsheim, the 1888 Kenosha mansion built by his mother Mary Head Wells and her second husband, Frederick Gottfredsen.) and Beatrice Ives Welles (née Beatrice Lucy Ives). He was named after one of his great-grandfathers, Kenosha attorney Orson S. Head, and his brother George Head. (Note: An alternative story of the source of his first and middle names was told by George Ade, who met Welles's parents on a West Indies cruise toward the end of 1914. Ade was traveling with a friend, Orson Wells (no relation), and the two of them sat at the same table as Mr. and Mrs. Richard Welles. Mrs. Welles was pregnant at the time, and when they said goodbye, she told them that she had enjoyed their company so much that if the child were a boy, she intended to name him after them: George Orson.) Orson's brother, Richard Ives Welles, who was ten years older, struggled with mental health problems and was institutionalized for eight years.

Despite his family's affluence, Welles encountered hardship when his parents separated after the family moved to Chicago in 1919. His father, an inventor who made a fortune manufacturing bicycle and automotive headlamps, became an alcoholic and stopped working. Welles's mother was a concert pianist who had studied with the pianist-composer Leopold Godowsky. She played during lectures by Dudley Crafts Watson at the Art Institute of Chicago to support her younger son and herself. Welles received piano and violin lessons arranged by his mother. Beatrice died of hepatitis in a Chicago hospital on May 10, 1924, just after Welles's ninth birthday. The Gordon String Quartet, which had made its first appearance at her home in 1921, played at Beatrice's funeral.

After his mother died, Welles ceased pursuing a musical career. It was decided he would spend the summer with the Watson family at a private art colony established by Lydia Avery Coonley Ward in the village of Wyoming in the Finger Lakes Region of New York. There he played and became friends with the children of Aga Khan, including the 12-year-old Prince Aly Khan. (Note: Years later, the two men successively married Rita Hayworth.) Then, in what Welles later described as "a hectic period", he lived in a Chicago apartment with his father and Maurice Bernstein, a Chicago physician who had been a close friend of his parents. Welles attended public school before his alcoholic father left business altogether and took him along on travels to Jamaica and the Far East. When they returned, they settled in a hotel his father owned in Grand Detour, Illinois. When the hotel burned down, Welles and his father took to the road again.

"During the three years that Orson lived with his father, some observers wondered who took care of whom", wrote biographer Frank Brady.

"In some ways, he was never really a young boy, you know", said Roger Hill, who became Welles's teacher and lifelong friend.

Welles attended public school in Madison, Wisconsin, enrolled in the fourth grade. On September 15, 1926, he entered the Todd Seminary for Boys, an expensive independent school in Woodstock, Illinois, that his older brother had attended until he was expelled. At Todd School, Welles came under the influence of Roger Hill, a teacher who was later the school's headmaster. Hill provided Welles with an ad hoc educational environment that allowed Welles to concentrate on subjects that interested him. Welles performed and staged theatrical experiments and productions.

"Todd provided Welles with many valuable experiences", wrote critic Richard France. "He was able to explore and experiment in an atmosphere of acceptance and encouragement. In addition to a theatre, the school's own radio station was at his disposal." Welles's first radio experience was on that station, performing his own adaptation of Sherlock Holmes.

On December 28, 1930, when Welles was 15, his father died of heart and kidney failure in a hotel in Chicago, aged 58. Shortly before, Welles had told his father that he refused to see him until he stopped drinking. Welles suffered lifelong guilt and despair that he was unable to express. "That was the last I ever saw of him", Welles told biographer Barbara Leaming 53 years later. "I don't want to forgive myself." His father's will left Welles to name his own guardian. When Roger Hill declined, he chose Dr. Bernstein.

Following graduation from Todd in May 1931, Welles was awarded a scholarship to Harvard College; his mentor Roger Hill advised him to attend Cornell College in Iowa. (Note: "Harvard reportedly offered a scholarship to its famous '47 Workshop' in playwriting", wrote biographer Patrick McGilligan. The course of study and training was created by George Pierce Baker in connection with the dramatics course known as English 47.) Instead, Welles chose travel. He studied for a few weeks at the Art Institute of Chicago with Boris Anisfeld, who encouraged him to pursue painting.

Welles occasionally returned to Woodstock. He was asked in a 1960 interview, "Where is home?" and replied, "I suppose it's Woodstock, Illinois, if it's anywhere ... If I try to think of a home, it's that."

== Career ==
=== Early career (1931–1935) ===
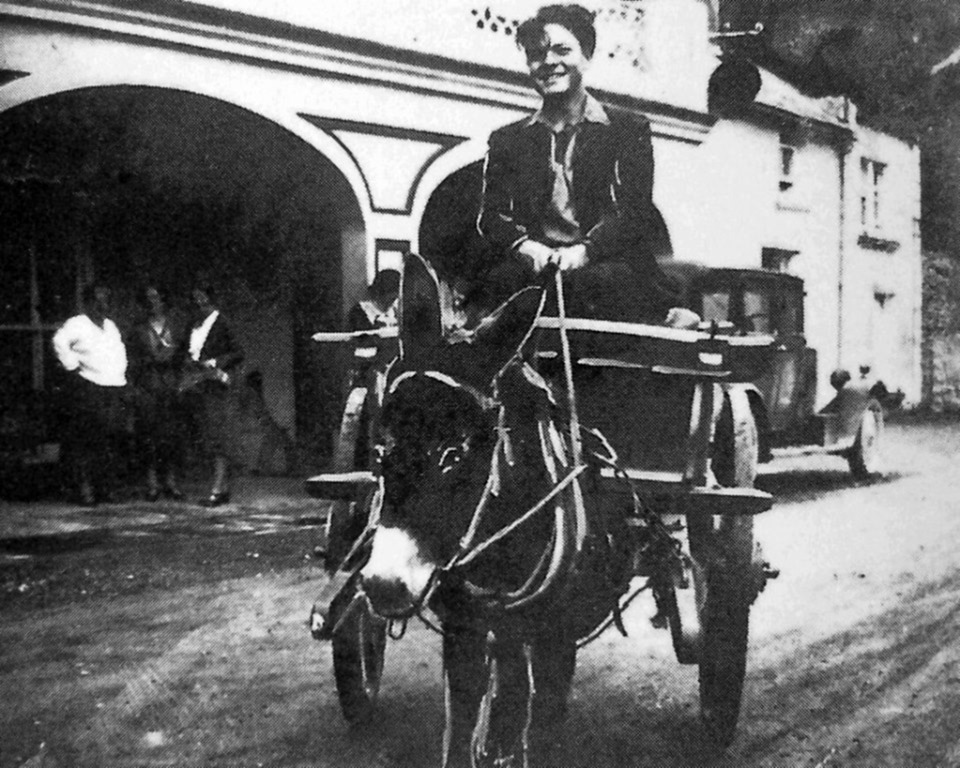
After graduating, 16-year-old Welles embarked on a painting and sketching tour of Ireland and the Aran Islands, traveling by donkey cart (1931).

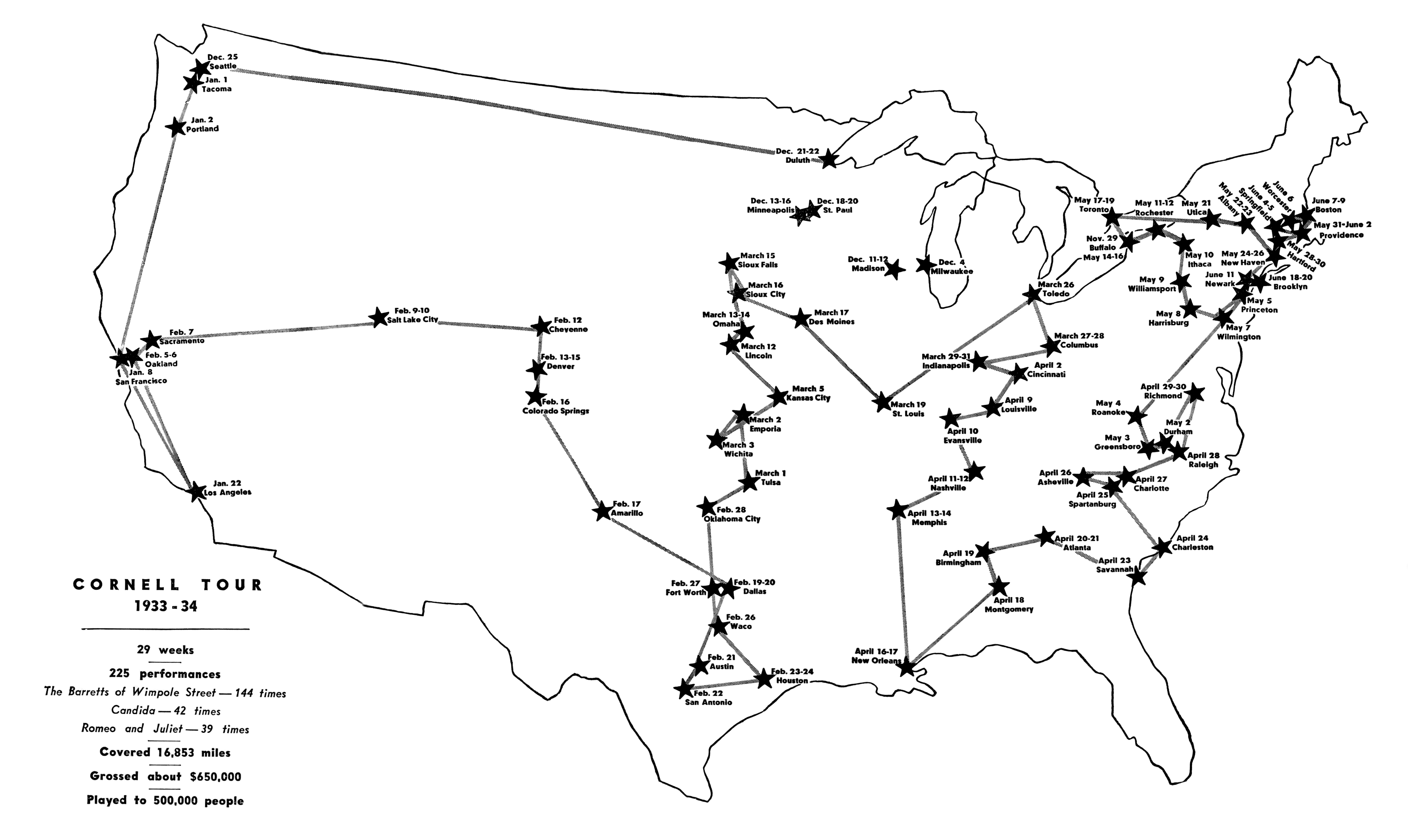
Map of Katharine Cornell's 1933–1934 transcontinental repertory tour, Welles's professional debut on the American stage

Welles's early short film, The Hearts of Age (1934)

After his father's death, Welles traveled to Europe using a portion of his inheritance. Welles said that while on a walking and painting trip through Ireland, he strode into the Gate Theatre in Dublin and claimed he was a Broadway star. The manager of the Gate, Hilton Edwards, later said he had not believed Welles but was impressed by his brashness and an impassioned audition. Welles made his stage debut at the Gate Theatre on October 13, 1931, appearing in Ashley Dukes's adaptation of Jud Süß as Duke Karl Alexander of Württemberg. He performed supporting roles in Gate productions, and produced and designed productions of his own. In March 1932, Welles performed in W. Somerset Maugham's The Circle at Dublin's Abbey Theatre and traveled to London to find work in the theatre. Unable to obtain a work permit, he returned to the U.S.

Welles found his fame ephemeral and turned to a writing project at Todd School that became immensely successful, first entitled Everybody's Shakespeare, for the first three volumes, and subsequently, The Mercury Shakespeare. In spring 1933, Welles traveled via the SS Exermont, a tramp steamer, writing the introduction for the books while on board. After landing at Morocco, he stayed as the guest of Thami El Glaoui, in the Atlas Mountains surrounding Tangier, while working on thousands of illustrations for the Everybody's Shakespeare series of educational books, a series that remained in print for decades.

In 1933, Hortense and Roger Hill invited Welles to a party in Chicago, where Welles met Thornton Wilder. Wilder arranged for Welles to meet Alexander Woollcott in New York so he could be introduced to Katharine Cornell, who was assembling a theatre company for a seven-month transcontinental repertory tour. Cornell's husband, director Guthrie McClintic, immediately put Welles under contract and cast him in three plays. Romeo and Juliet, The Barretts of Wimpole Street and Candida began touring in repertory in November 1933, with the first of more than 200 performances taking place in Buffalo, New York.

In 1934, Welles got his first job on radio—with The American School of the Air—through actor-director Paul Stewart, who introduced him to director Knowles Entrikin. That summer, Welles staged a drama festival with the Todd School at the Opera House in Woodstock, Illinois, inviting Micheál Mac Liammóir and Hilton Edwards from Dublin's Gate Theatre to appear along with New York stage luminaries in productions including Trilby, Hamlet, The Drunkard and Tsar Paul. At the old firehouse in Woodstock, he also shot his first film, an eight-minute short titled The Hearts of Age.

On November 14, 1934, Welles married Chicago socialite and actress Virginia Nicolson in a civil ceremony in New York. To appease the Nicolsons, who were furious at the elopement, a formal ceremony took place December 23, 1934, at the New Jersey mansion of the bride's godmother. Welles wore a cutaway borrowed from his friend George Macready.

A revised production of Katharine Cornell's Romeo and Juliet opened December 20, 1934, at the Martin Beck Theatre in New York. The Broadway production brought the 19-year-old Welles to the notice of John Houseman, a theatrical producer who was casting the lead in the debut production of one of Archibald MacLeish's verse plays, Panic. On March 22, 1935, Welles made his debut on the CBS Radio series The March of Time, performing a scene from Panic for a news report on the stage production.

By 1935, Welles was supplementing his earnings in the theatre as a radio actor in Manhattan, working with many actors who later formed the core of his Mercury Theatre on programs including America's Hour, Cavalcade of America, Columbia Workshop and The March of Time. "Within a year of his debut Welles could claim membership in that elite band of radio actors who commanded salaries second only to the highest paid movie stars," wrote critic Richard France.

=== Theatre and radio stardom (1936–1940) ===
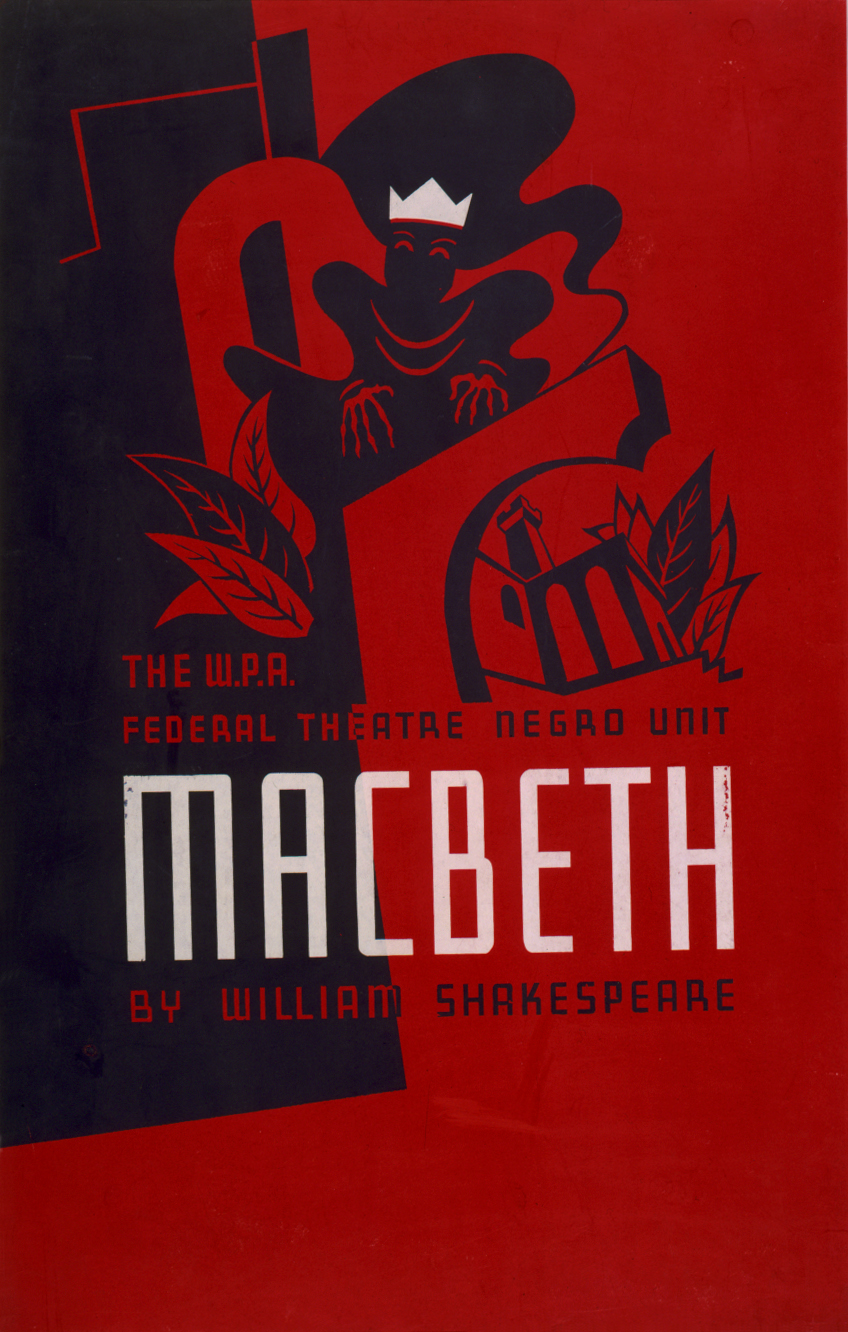
Macbeth (1936)

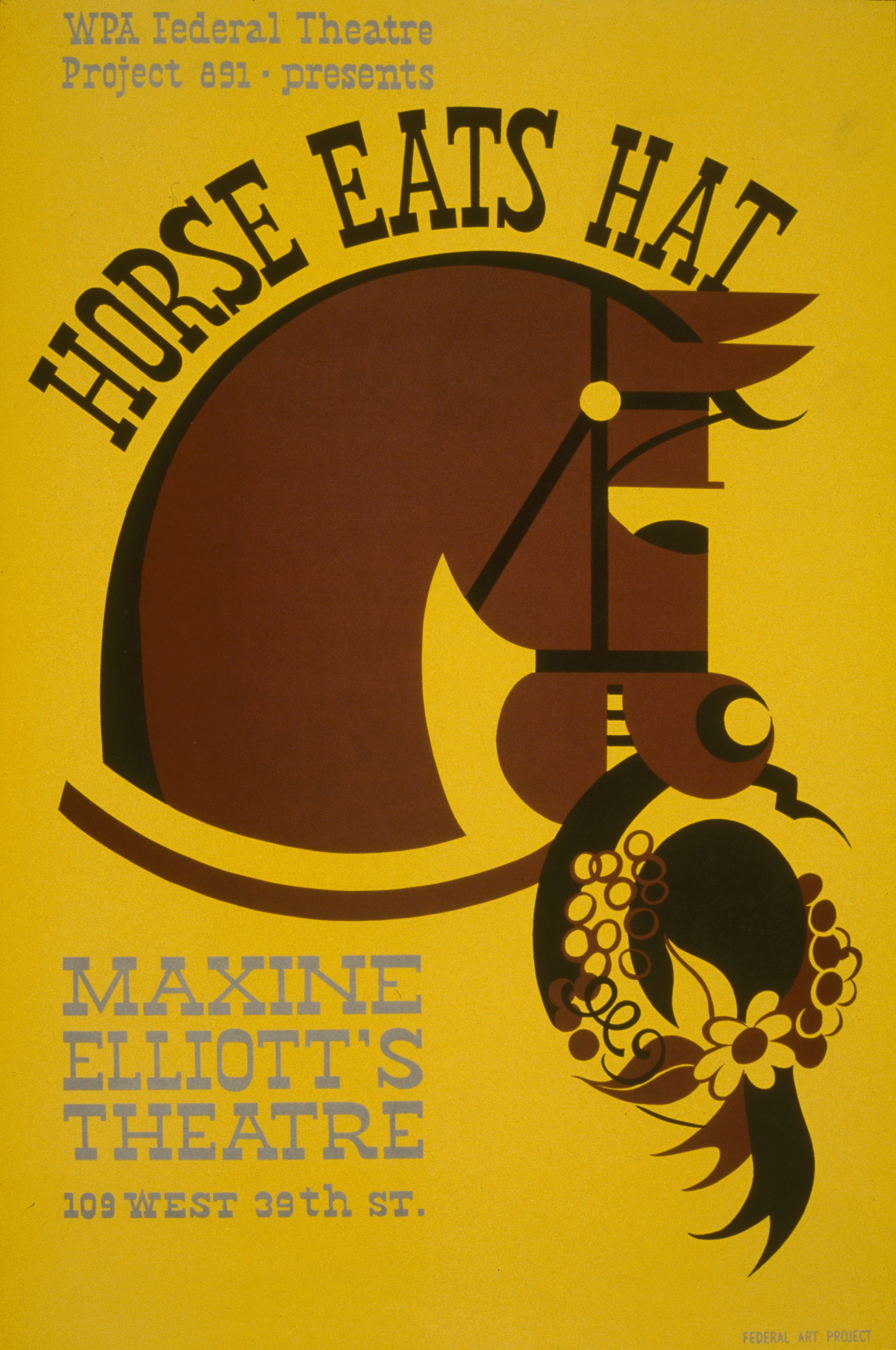
Horse Eats Hat (1936)

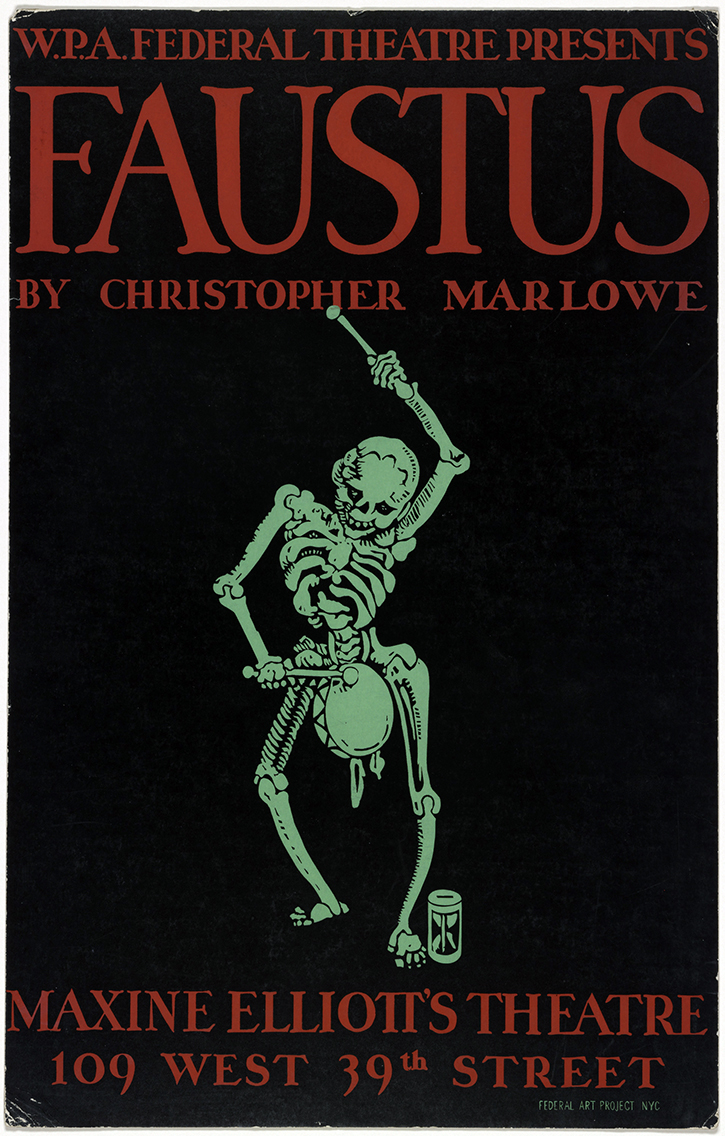
Faustus (1937)

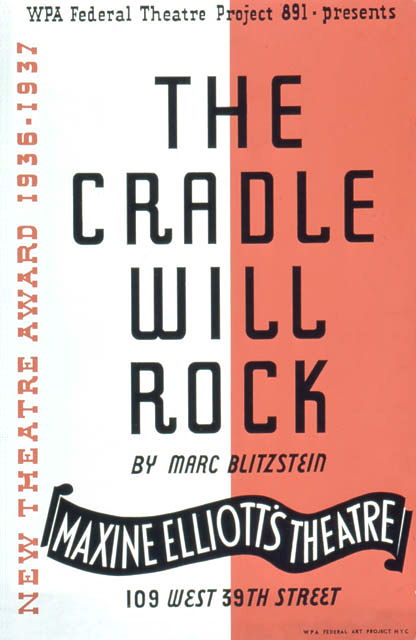
The Cradle Will Rock (1937)

Part of the Works Progress Administration, the Federal Theatre Project (1935–1939) was a New Deal program to fund theatre and other live artistic performances and entertainment programs in the US during the Great Depression. It was created as a relief measure to employ artists, writers, directors and theatre workers. Under national director Hallie Flanagan it was shaped into a national theatre that created relevant art, encouraged experimentation and innovation, and made it possible for millions of Americans to see live theatre for the first time.

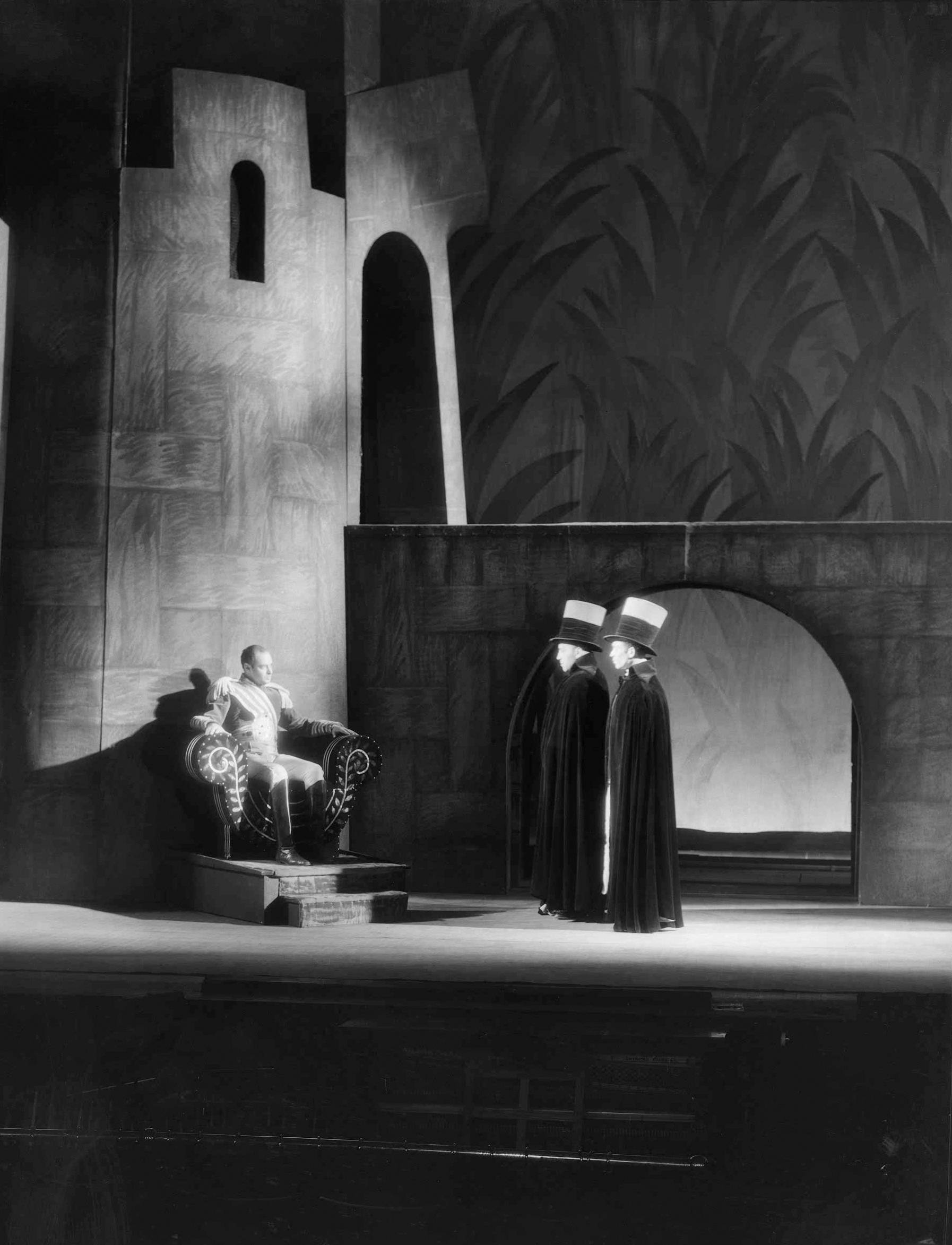
Macbeth (Jack Carter, left) with the Murderers in Macbeth (1936)

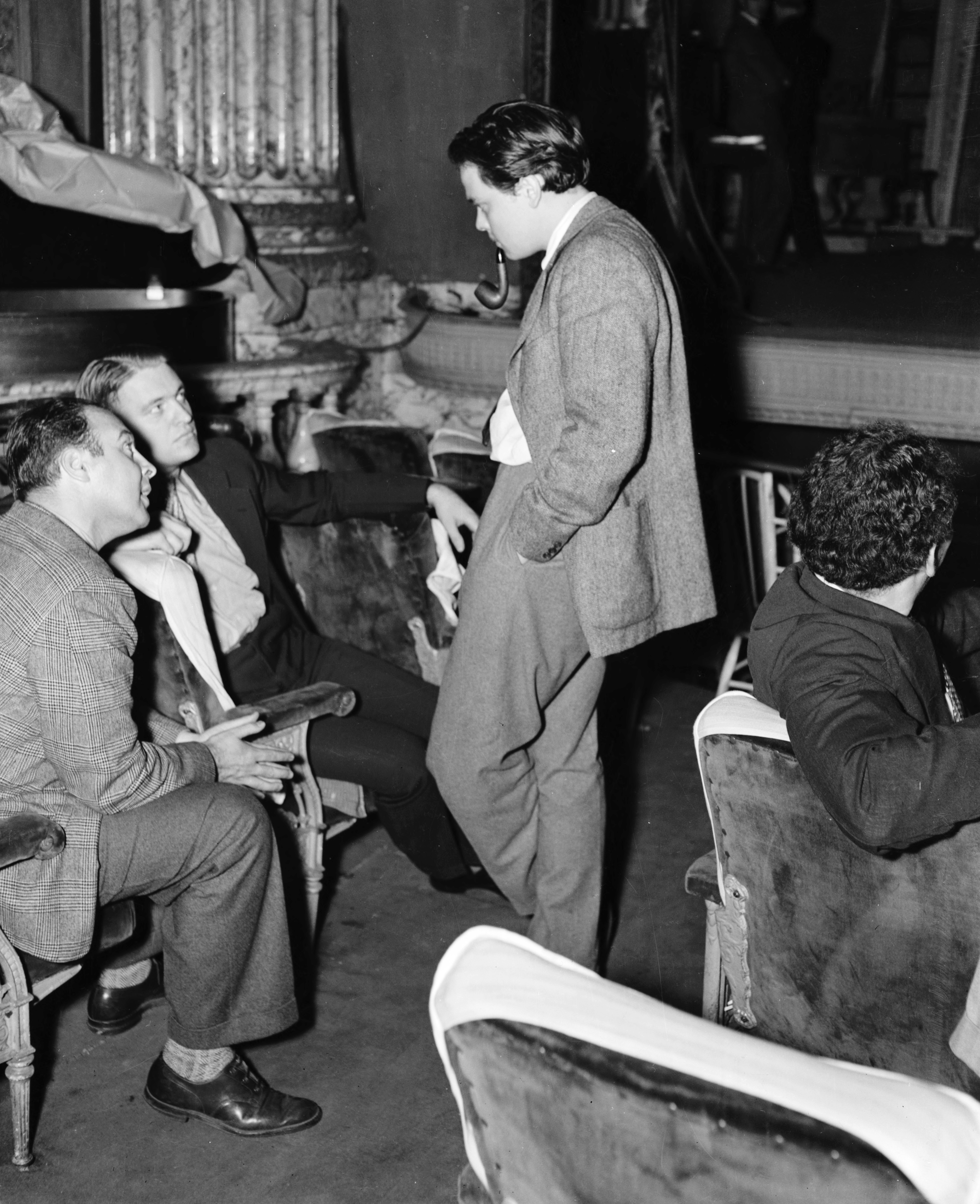
From left, Houseman, Edwin Denby and Welles at a rehearsal of Horse Eats Hat (1936)

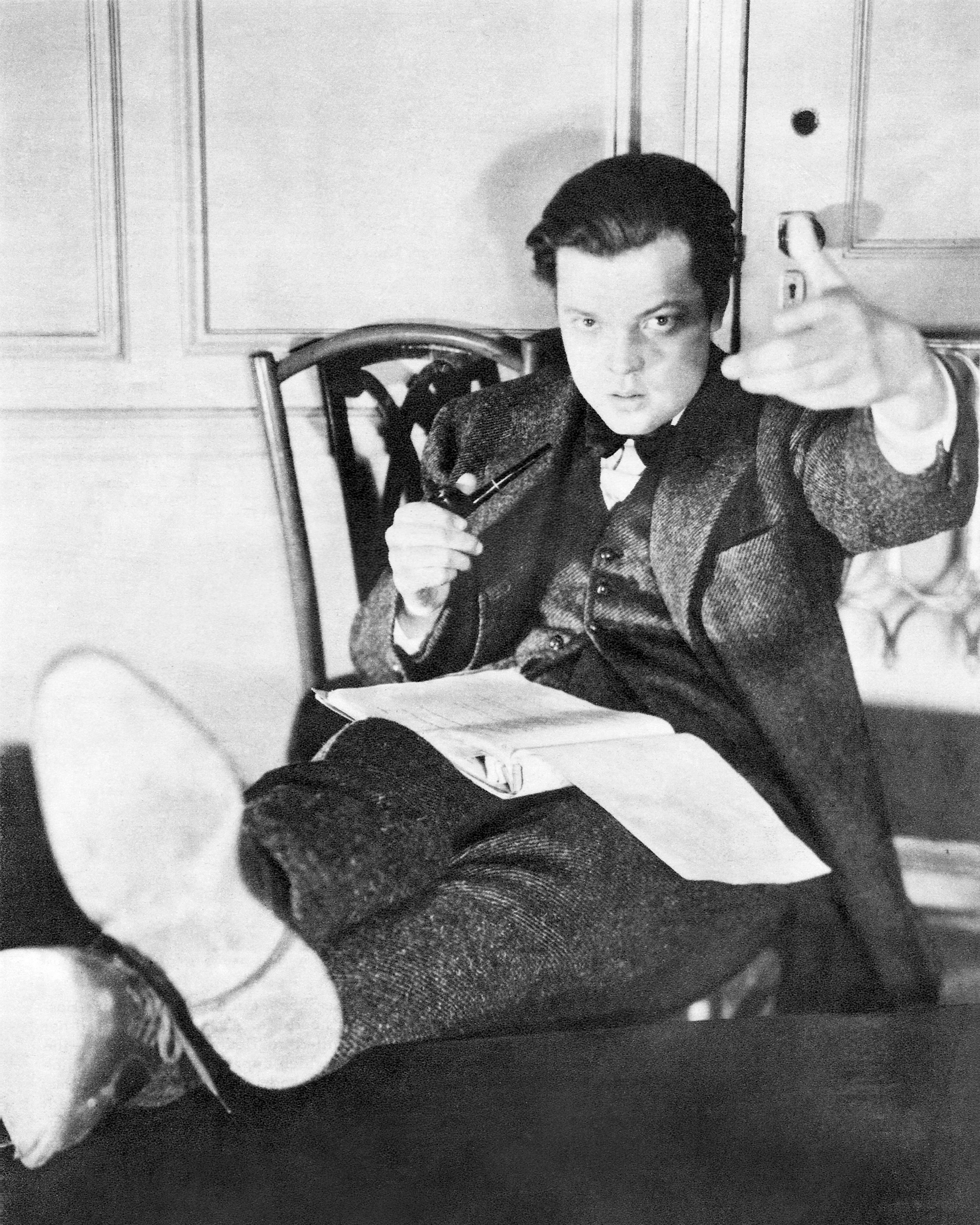
At 22, Welles was Broadway's youngest impresario—producing, directing and starring in an adaptation of Julius Caesar that broke all performance records for the play (1938).

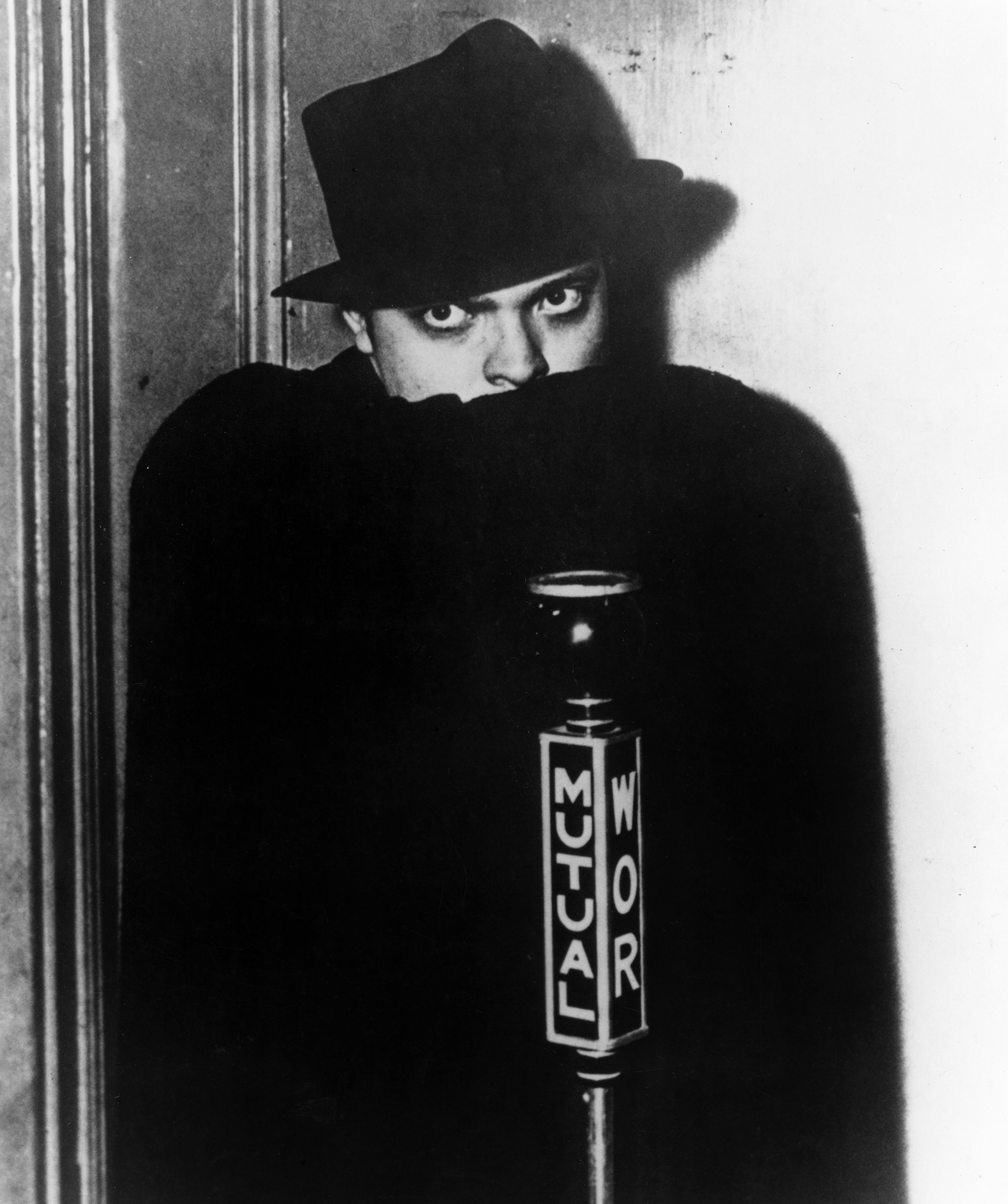
Welles was the voice of The Shadow on the Mutual radio network (1937–1938).

John Houseman, director of the Negro Theatre Unit in New York, invited Welles to join the Federal Theatre Project in 1935. Far from unemployed—"I was so employed I forgot how to sleep"—Welles put a large share of his $1,500-a-week radio earnings into his stage productions, bypassing administrative red tape and mounting the projects more quickly and professionally. "Roosevelt once said that I was the only operator in history who ever illegally siphoned money into a Washington project," Welles said.

The Federal Theatre Project was the ideal environment in which Welles could develop his art. Its purpose was employment, so he was able to hire many artists, craftsmen and technicians, and he filled the stage with performers. The company for the first production, an adaptation of Shakespeare's Macbeth with an African-American cast, numbered 150. The production became known as the Voodoo Macbeth because Welles changed the setting to a mythical island suggesting the Haitian court of King Henri Christophe, with Haitian vodou fulfilling the role of Scottish witchcraft. The play opened April 14, 1936, at the Lafayette Theatre in Harlem and was received rapturously. At 20, Welles was hailed as a prodigy. The production then made a 4,000-mile national tour that included two weeks at the Texas Centennial Exposition that defied the state's segregation laws.

Simultaneously with his work in the theatre, Welles worked extensively in radio as an actor, writer, director, and producer, often without credit. Between 1935 and 1937 he was earning as much as $2,000 a week, shuttling between studios at such a pace that he would arrive barely in time for a scan of his lines before he was on the air. While he was directing the Voodoo Macbeth, Welles was dashing between Harlem and midtown Manhattan three times a day to meet his radio commitments.

In addition to continuing as a repertory player on The March of Time in the fall of 1936, Welles adapted and performed Hamlet in an episode of CBS Radio's Columbia Workshop. His performance as the announcer in the series' April 1937 presentation of Archibald MacLeish's verse drama The Fall of the City was an important development in his radio career and made the 21-year-old Welles an overnight star.

Next mounted was the farce Horse Eats Hat, an adaptation by Welles and Edwin Denby of The Italian Straw Hat, an 1851 five-act farce by Eugène Marin Labiche and Marc-Michel. The play was presented September 26 – December 5, 1936, at Maxine Elliott's Theatre, New York, and featured Joseph Cotten in his first starring role. It was followed by an adaptation of Dr. Faustus that used light as a prime unifying scenic element in a nearly black stage, presented January 8 – May 9, 1937, at Maxine Elliott's Theatre. Outside the scope of the Federal Theatre Project, American composer Aaron Copland chose Welles to direct The Second Hurricane (1937), an operetta with a libretto by Edwin Denby. Presented at the Henry Street Settlement Music School in New York for the benefit of high school students, the production opened April 21, 1937, and ran its scheduled three performances.

In 1937, Welles rehearsed Marc Blitzstein's political opera, The Cradle Will Rock. It was originally scheduled to open June 16, 1937, in its first public preview. Because of cutbacks in the WPA projects, the premiere at the Maxine Elliott Theatre was canceled. The theater was locked, and guarded, to prevent any government-purchased materials from being used for a commercial production of the work. In a last-minute move, Welles announced to ticket-holders that the show was being transferred to the Venice, 20 blocks away. Some cast, crew and audience, walked on foot. The union musicians refused to perform in a commercial theater for lower non-union government wages. The actors' union stated that the production belonged to the Federal Theatre Project, and could not be performed outside that context without permission. Lacking participation of the union members, The Cradle Will Rock began with Blitzstein introducing it and playing the piano accompaniment on stage, with some cast members performing from the audience. This impromptu performance was well received.

Breaking with the Federal Theatre Project in 1937, Welles and Houseman founded a repertory company, called the Mercury Theatre. The name was inspired by the title of the iconoclastic magazine The American Mercury. Welles was executive producer, and the original company included such actors as Joseph Cotten, George Coulouris, Geraldine Fitzgerald, Arlene Francis, Martin Gabel, John Hoyt, Norman Lloyd, Vincent Price, Stefan Schnabel and Hiram Sherman.

"I think he was the greatest directorial talent we've ever had in the [American] theater", Lloyd said of Welles in 2014. "When you saw a Welles production, you saw the text had been affected, the staging was remarkable, the sets were unusual, music, sound, lighting, a totality of everything. We had not had such a man in our theater. He was the first and remains the greatest."

The Mercury Theatre opened November 11, 1937, with Caesar, Welles's modern-dress adaptation of Shakespeare's Julius Caesar—streamlined into an anti-fascist tour de force that Joseph Cotten later described as "so vigorous, so contemporary that it set Broadway on its ear". The set was completely open with no curtain, and the brick stage wall was painted dark red. Scene changes were achieved by lighting alone. On the stage was a series of risers; squares were cut into one at intervals and lights, designed by Jean Rosenthal, were set beneath it, pointing straight up to evoke the "cathedral of light" at the Nuremberg Rallies. "He staged it like a political melodrama that happened the night before," said Lloyd.

In July 1937, the Mutual Network gave Welles a seven-week series to adapt Les Misérables. It was his first job as a writer-director for radio, the debut of the Mercury Theatre, and one of Welles's finest achievements. He invented the use of narration in radio. "By making himself the center of the storytelling process, Welles fostered the impression of self-adulation that was to haunt his career to his dying day", wrote critic Andrew Sarris. "For the most part, however, Welles was singularly generous to the other members of his cast and inspired loyalty from them above and beyond the call of professionalism." That September, Mutual chose Welles to play Lamont Cranston, also known as The Shadow. He performed the role through mid-September 1938.

Beginning January 1, 1938, Caesar was performed in repertory with The Shoemaker's Holiday; both productions moved to the larger National Theatre. They were followed by Heartbreak House (April 29, 1938) and Danton's Death (November 5, 1938). As well as being presented in a pared-down oratorio version at the Mercury Theatre in December 1937, The Cradle Will Rock was at the Windsor Theatre January 4 – April 2, 1938. Such was the success of the Mercury Theatre that Welles appeared on the cover of Time, in full makeup as Captain Shotover in Heartbreak House, on May 9—three days after his 23rd birthday.

After the theatrical successes of the Mercury Theatre, CBS Radio invited Welles to create a summer show for 13 weeks. The series began July 11, 1938, with the formula that Welles would play the lead in each show. The weekly hour-long show presented radio plays based on classic literary works, with original music composed and conducted by Bernard Herrmann.

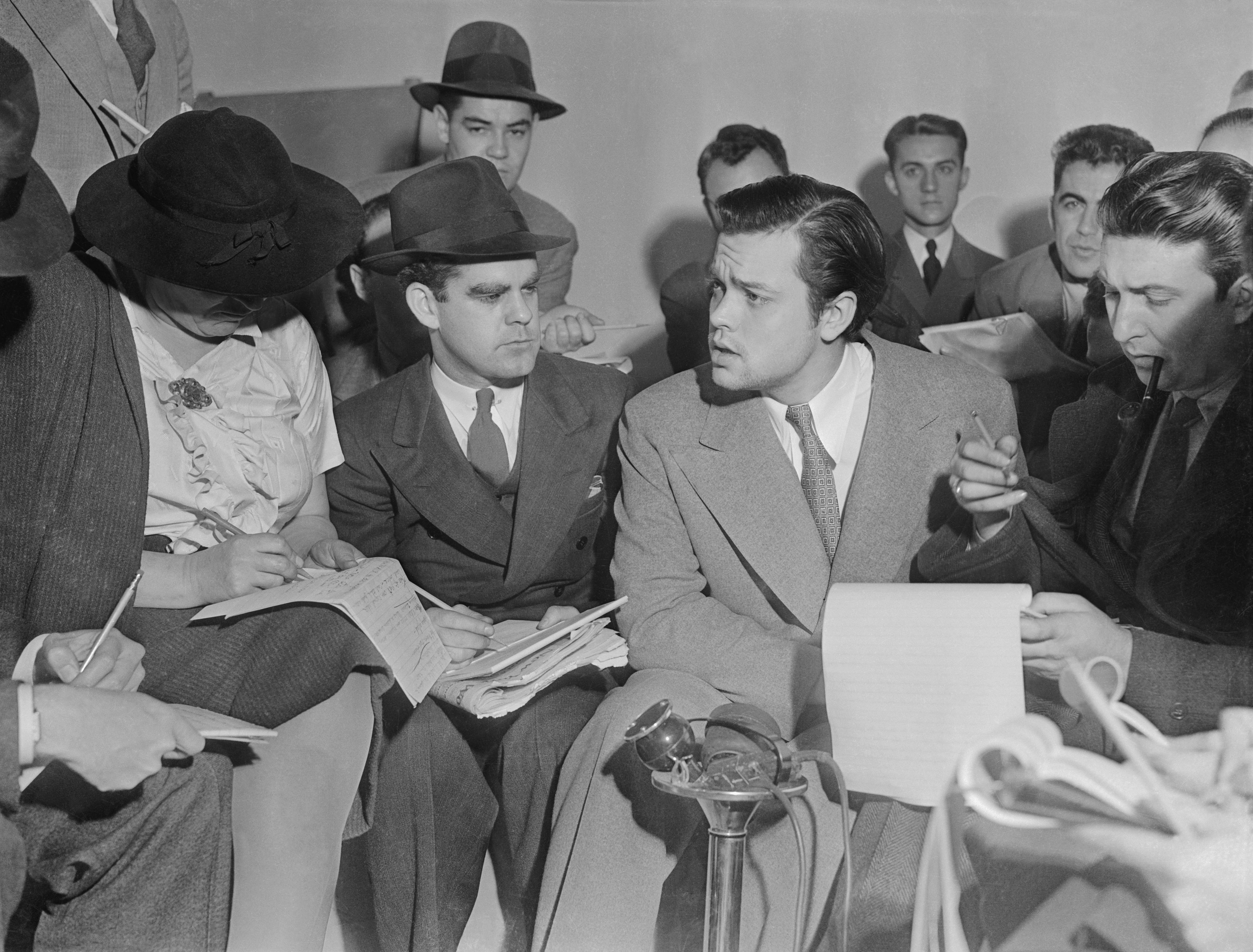
Welles at the press conference after "The War of the Worlds" broadcast (October 31, 1938)

The Mercury Theatre's radio adaptation of The War of the Worlds by H. G. Wells October 30, 1938, brought Welles instant fame. The combination of the news bulletin form of the performance, with the between-breaks dial-spinning habits of listeners, created confusion among listeners who failed to hear the introduction, although the extent of this confusion has come into question. Panic was reportedly spread among listeners who believed the fictional news reports of a Martian invasion. The myth of the result created by the combination was reported as fact around the world and disparagingly mentioned by Adolf Hitler in a speech. Welles's growing fame drew Hollywood offers, lures that the independent-minded Welles resisted at first. The Mercury Theatre on the Air, which had been a sustaining show (without sponsorship), was picked up by Campbell Soup and renamed The Campbell Playhouse. The Mercury Theatre on the Air made its last broadcast on December 4, 1938, and The Campbell Playhouse began five days later.

Welles began commuting from California to New York for the Sunday broadcasts of The Campbell Playhouse after signing a film contract with RKO Pictures in August 1939. In November, production of the show moved to Los Angeles. After 20 shows, Campbell began to exercise more creative control and had complete control over story selection. As his contract with Campbell came to an end, Welles chose not to sign on for another season. After the broadcast of March 31, 1940, Welles and Campbell parted amicably.

RKO Radio Pictures president George J. Schaefer ultimately offered Welles what generally is considered the greatest contract offered to a filmmaker, much less to one who was untried. Engaging him to write, produce, direct and perform in two pictures, the contract subordinated the studio's financial interests to Welles's creative control, and broke precedent by granting Welles final cut privilege. After signing a summary agreement with RKO on July 22, Welles signed a full-length 63-page contract August 21, 1939. The agreement was bitterly resented by the Hollywood studios and persistently mocked in the trade press.

=== Hollywood success and filmmaking (1941–1948) ===
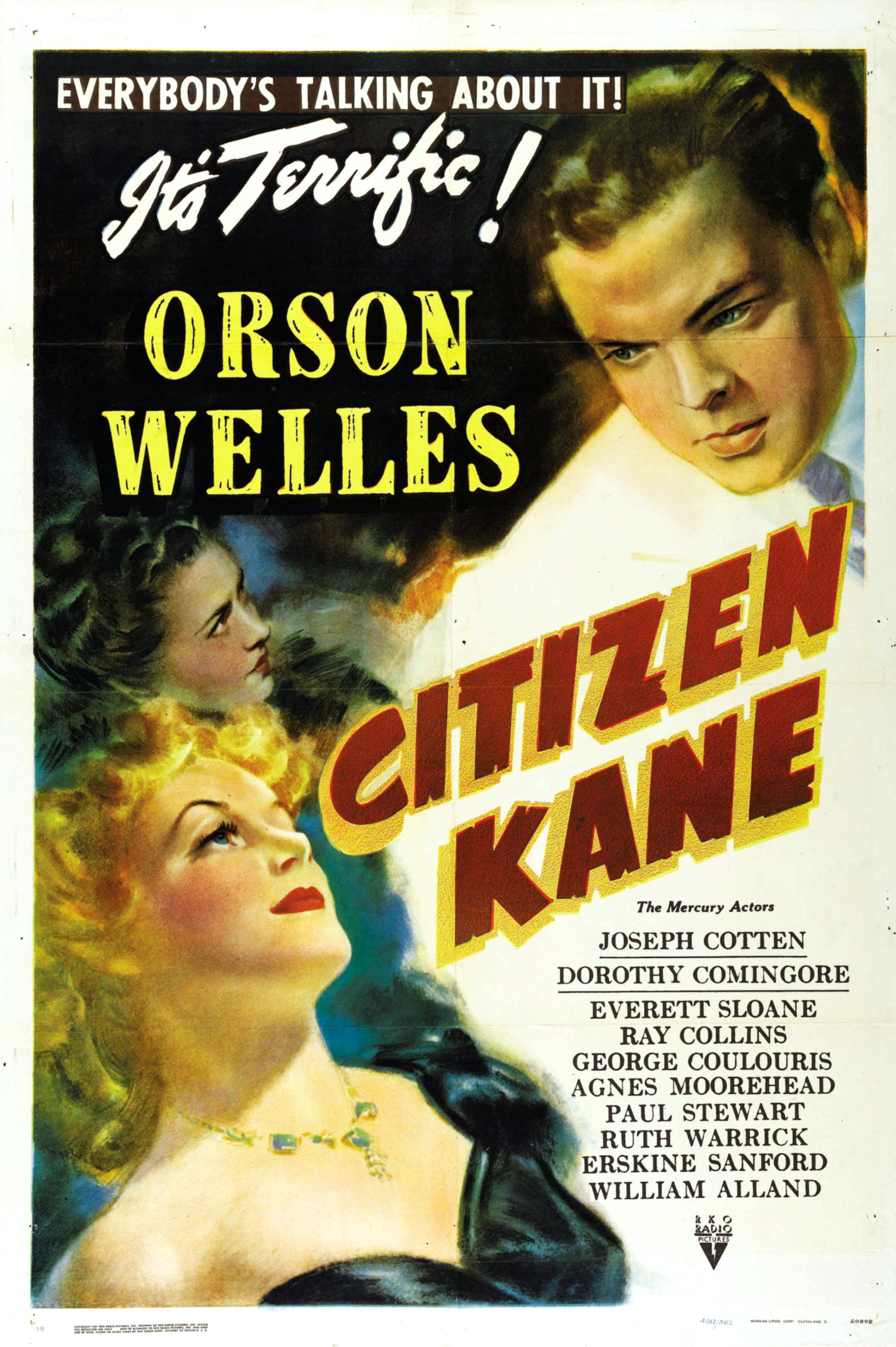
Citizen Kane (1941)

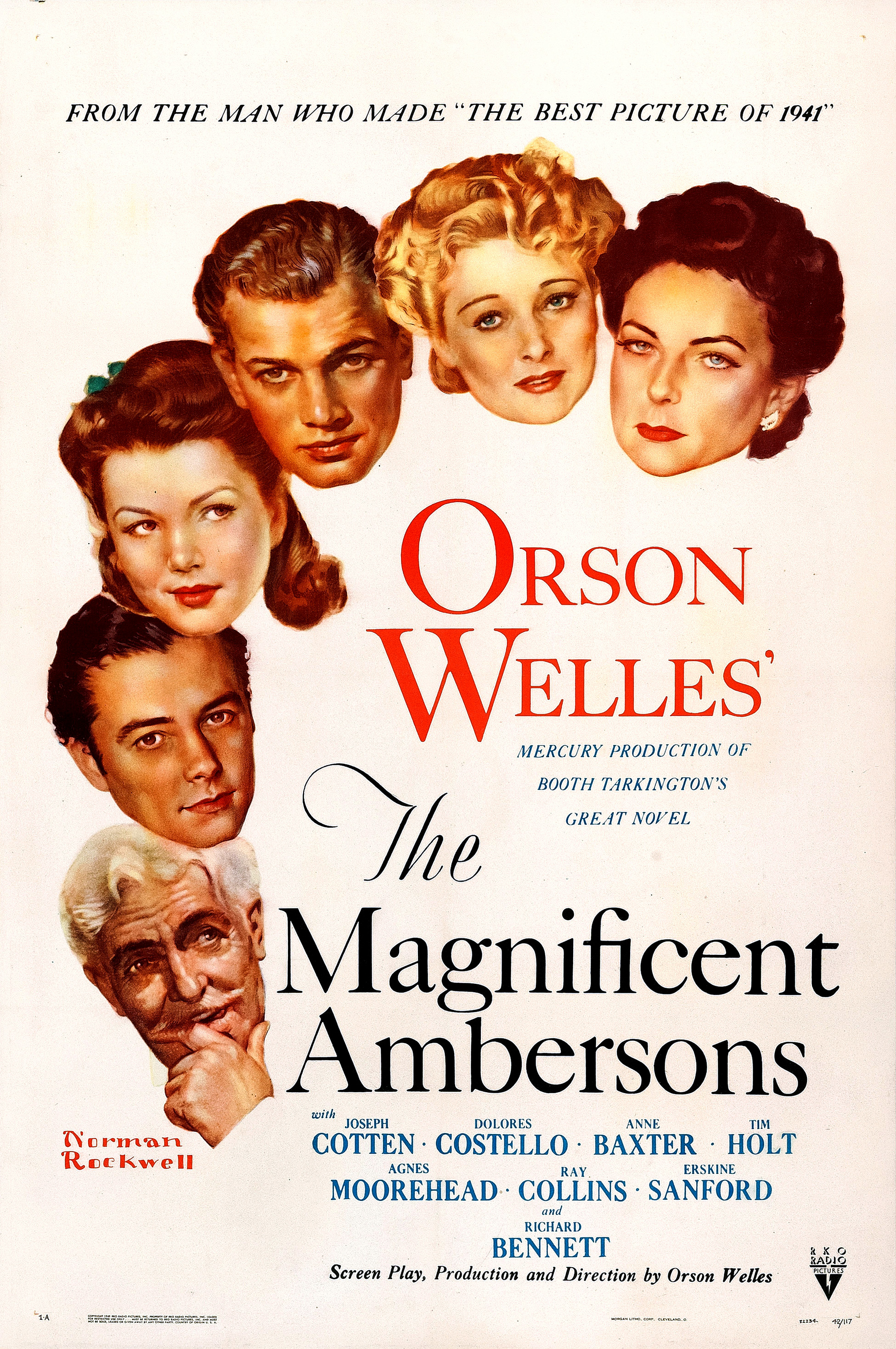
The Magnificent Ambersons (1942)

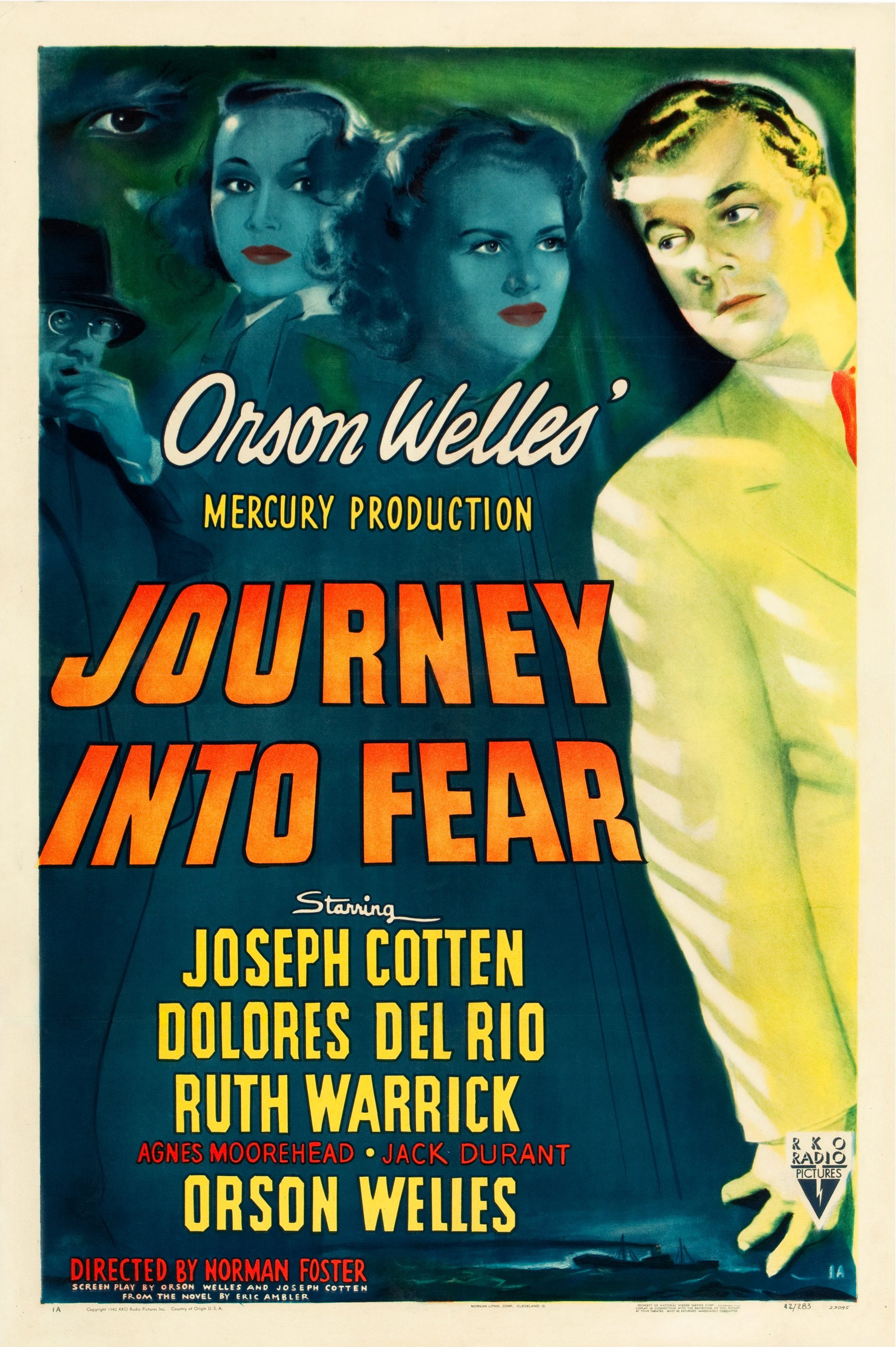
Journey into Fear (1943)

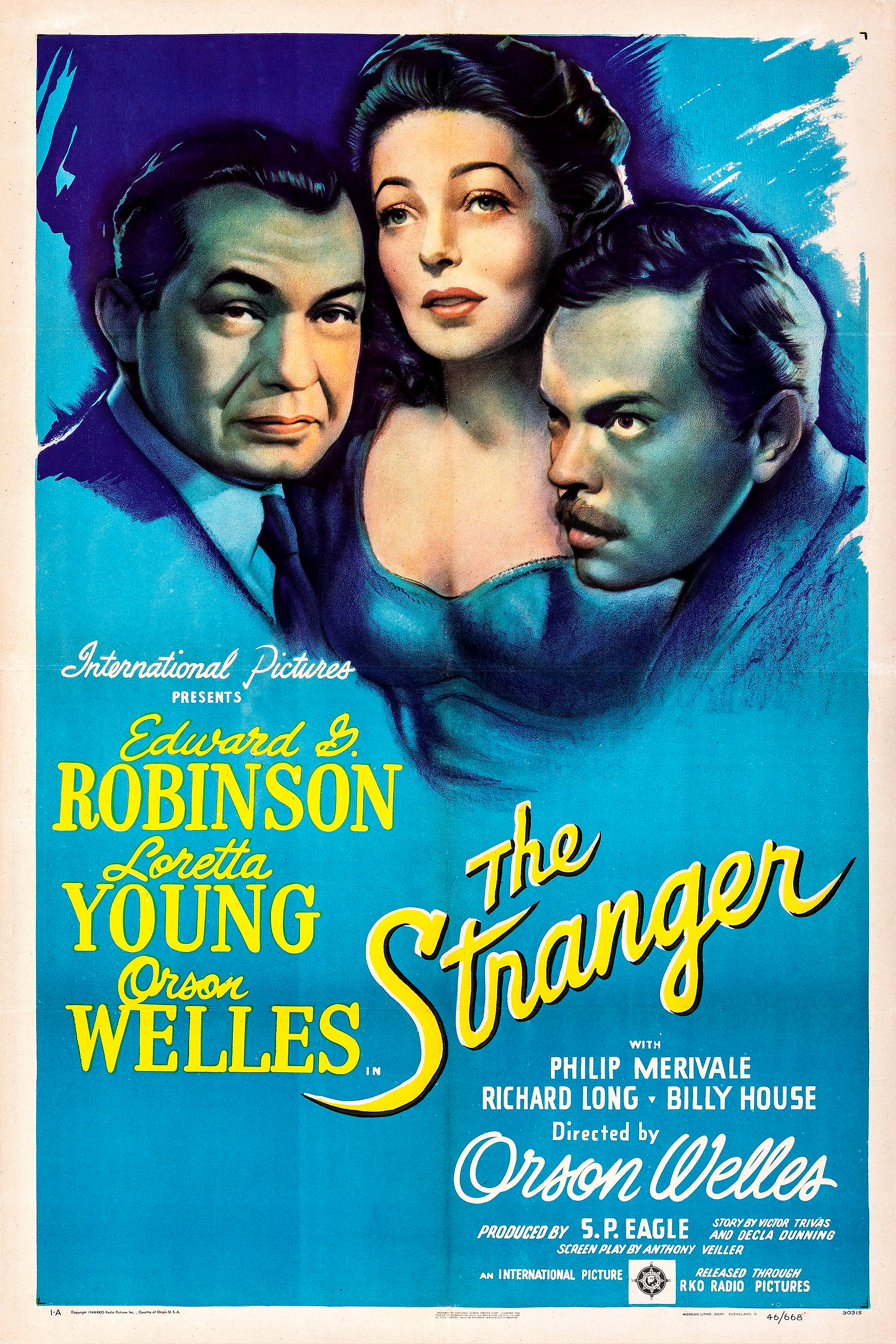
The Stranger (1946)

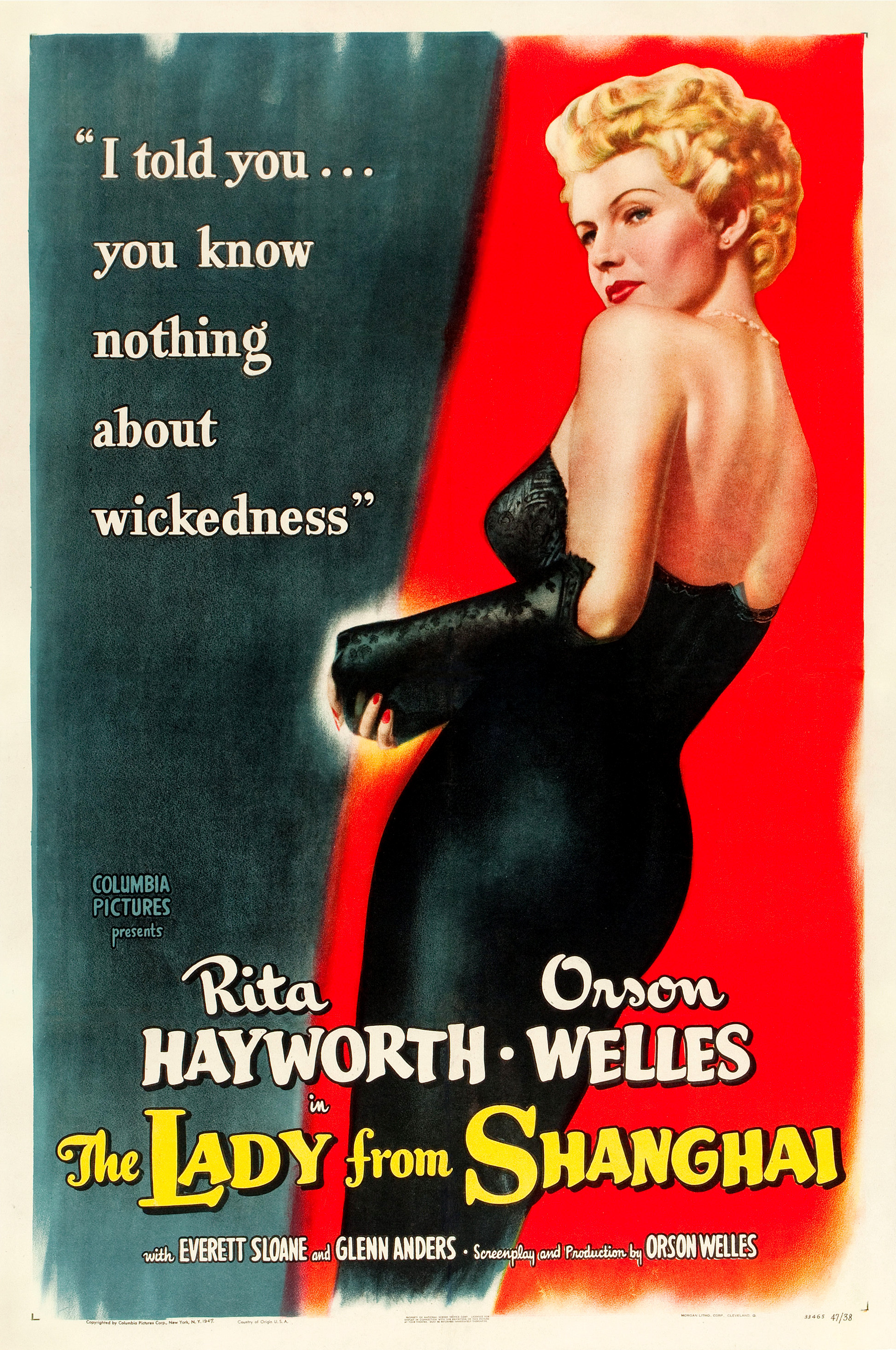
The Lady from Shanghai (1947)

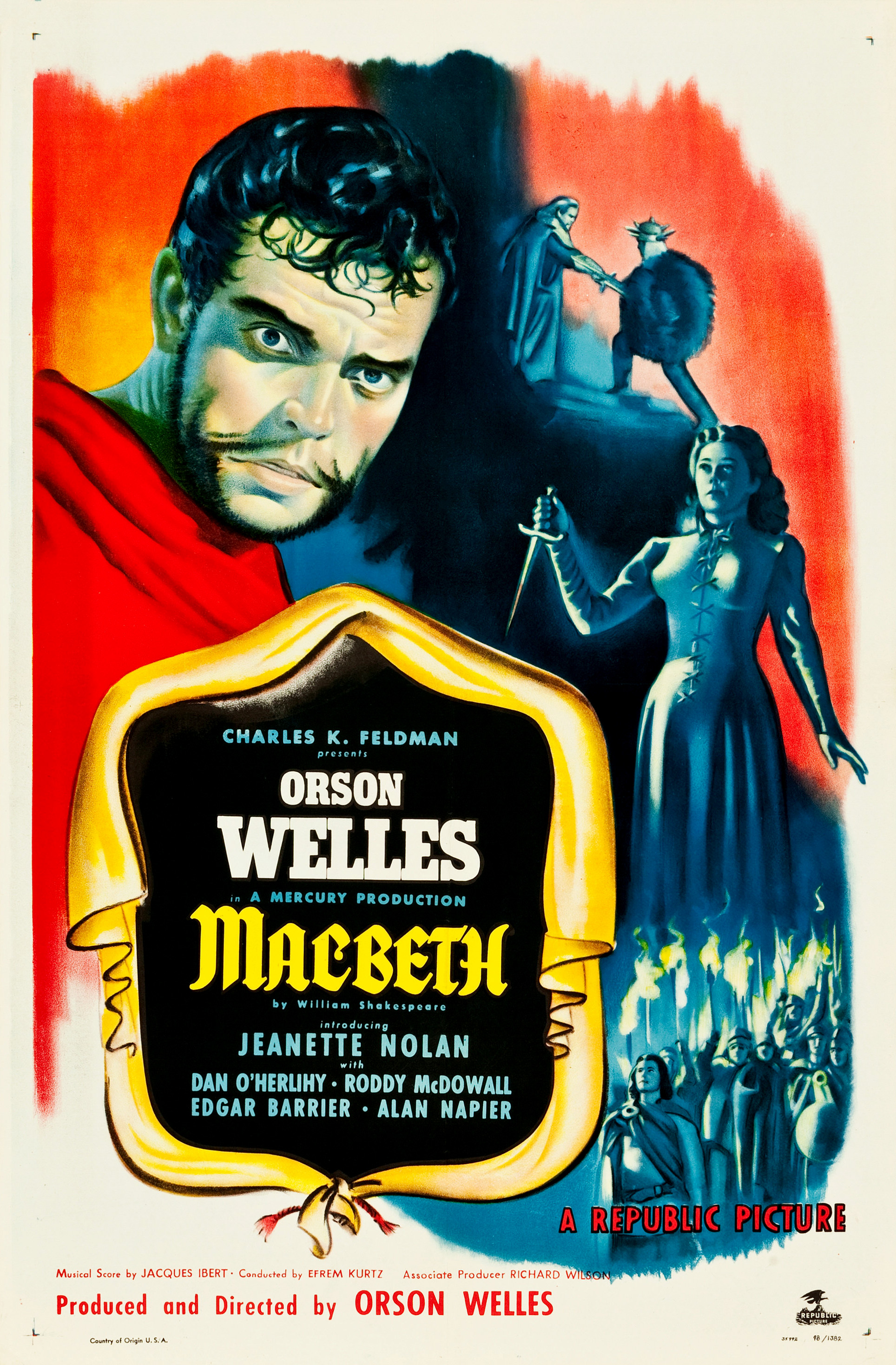
Macbeth (1948)

==== Citizen Kane ====
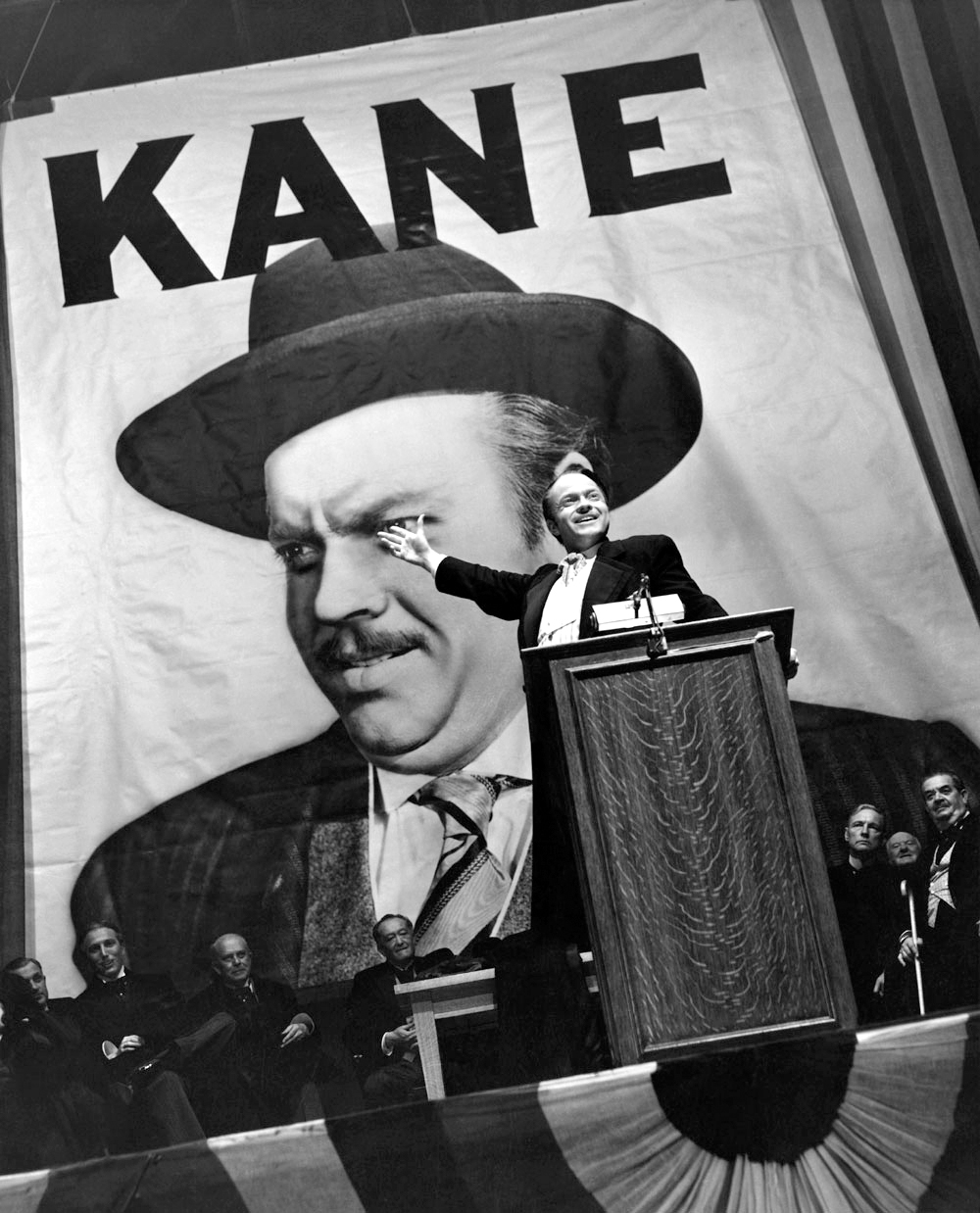
Welles in Citizen Kane (1941)

RKO rejected Welles's first two movie proposals, but agreed on the third—Citizen Kane. Welles co-wrote, produced, directed and starred in it. Welles conceived the project with screenwriter Herman J. Mankiewicz, who was writing radio plays for The Campbell Playhouse. Mankiewicz based the original outline of the film script on the life of William Randolph Hearst, whom he knew and came to hate after being exiled from Hearst's circle.

After agreeing on the storyline and character, Welles supplied Mankiewicz with 300 pages of notes and put him under contract to write the first-draft screenplay under the supervision of John Houseman. Welles wrote his own draft, then drastically condensed and rearranged both versions and added scenes of his own. The industry accused Welles of underplaying Mankiewicz's contribution to the script, but Welles countered the attacks by saying, "At the end, naturally, I was the one making the picture, after all—who had to make the decisions. I used what I wanted of Mank's and, rightly or wrongly, kept what I liked of my own."

For the cast, Welles primarily used actors from his Mercury Theatre, including William Alland, Ray Collins, Joseph Cotten, Agnes Moorehead, Erskine Sanford, Everett Sloane and Paul Stewart in their film debuts. Welles's project attracted some of Hollywood's best technicians, including cinematographer Gregg Toland. Welles and Toland made extensive use of deep focus photography, in which everything in the frame is in focus. Toland explained that he and Welles thought "that if it was possible, the picture should be brought to the screen in such a way that the audience would feel it was looking at reality, rather than merely at a movie." They composed "our angles and compositions so that action which ordinarily would be shown in direct cuts would be shown in a single, longer scene—often one in which important action might take place simultaneously in widely separated points in extreme foreground and background."

Toland explained their use of deep (or pan) focus:

Through its use, it is possible to photograph action from a range of eighteen inches from the camera lens to over two hundred feet away, with extreme foreground and background figures and action both recorded in sharp relief. Hitherto, the camera had to be focused either for a close or a distant shot, all efforts to encompass both at the same time resulting in one or the other being out of focus. This handicap necessitated the breaking up of a scene into long and short angles, with much consequent loss of realism. With pan-focus, the camera, like the human eye, sees an entire panorama at once, with everything clear and lifelike.

Welles called Toland "the greatest gift any director—young or old—could ever, ever have. And he never tried to impress on us that he was performing miracles. He just went ahead and performed them. I was calling on him to do things only a beginner could be ignorant enough to think anybody could ever do, and there he was, doing them." When asked why he and Toland used deep focus, Welles explained: "Well, in life you see everything in focus at the same time, so why not in the movies?"

It was the first film scored by Bernard Herrmann, who had worked with Welles in radio. Hermann recalled: "two full weeks were spent in the dubbing room, and music under our supervision was often re-recorded six or seven times before the proper dynamic level was achieved. The result is an exact projection of the original musical ideas in the score. Technically, no composer could ask for more." Filming Citizen Kane took ten weeks.

Hearst's newspapers barred all reference to Citizen Kane and exerted enormous pressure on the Hollywood film community to force RKO to shelve the film. RKO chief George J. Schaefer received a cash offer from MGM's Louis B. Mayer and other major studio executives if he would destroy the negative and existing prints of the film.

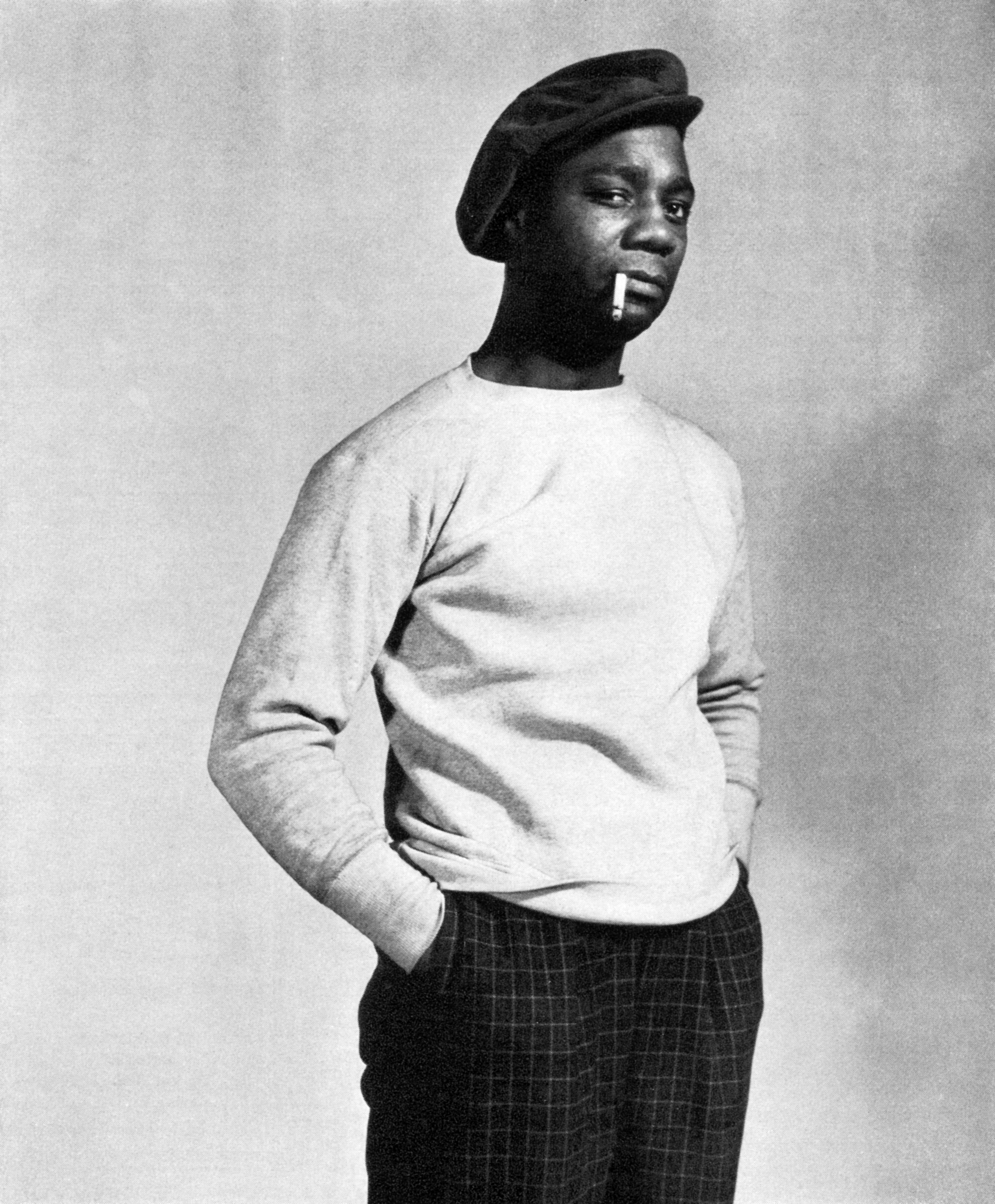
Canada Lee as Bigger Thomas in Native Son (1941), co-produced and directed by Welles

While waiting for Citizen Kane to be released, Welles produced and directed the original Broadway production of Native Son, a drama written by Paul Green and Richard Wright based on Wright's novel. Starring Canada Lee, the show ran March 24 – June 28, 1941, at the St. James Theatre. The Mercury Production was the last time Welles and Houseman worked together.

Although Citizen Kane was given a limited release, it received overwhelming critical praise. It was voted the best picture of 1941 by the National Board of Review and New York Film Critics Circle. The film garnered nine Academy Award nominations but won only Best Original Screenplay, shared by Mankiewicz and Welles. Variety reported that block voting by extras deprived Citizen Kane of Oscars for Best Picture and Best Actor (Welles), and similar prejudices were likely to have been responsible for the film receiving no technical awards. Bosley Crowther wrote that Welles "has made a picture of tremendous and overpowering scope, not in physical extent so much as in its rapid and graphic rotation of thoughts. Mr. Welles has put upon the screen a motion picture that really moves." Cecelia Ager, in PM Magazine, wrote: "Before Citizen Kane, it's as if the motion picture were a slumbering monster, a mighty force stupidly sleeping, lying there...awaiting a fierce young man to come kick it to life, to rouse it, shake it, awaken it to its potentialities ... Seeing it, it's as if you never really saw a movie before."

The delay in the film's release and uneven distribution contributed to mediocre results at the box office. After it ran its course theatrically, Citizen Kane was retired to the vault in 1942. In France, however, its reputation grew after it was seen there for the first time in 1946. In the US, it began to be re-evaluated after it appeared on television in 1956. That year it was re-released theatrically, and film critic Andrew Sarris described it as "the great American film" and "the work that influenced the cinema more profoundly than any American film since The Birth of a Nation." Citizen Kane is now widely hailed as one of the greatest films ever made. From 1962 to 2012, it topped the decennial Sight and Sound poll of the Greatest Films of All Time.

==== The Magnificent Ambersons ====
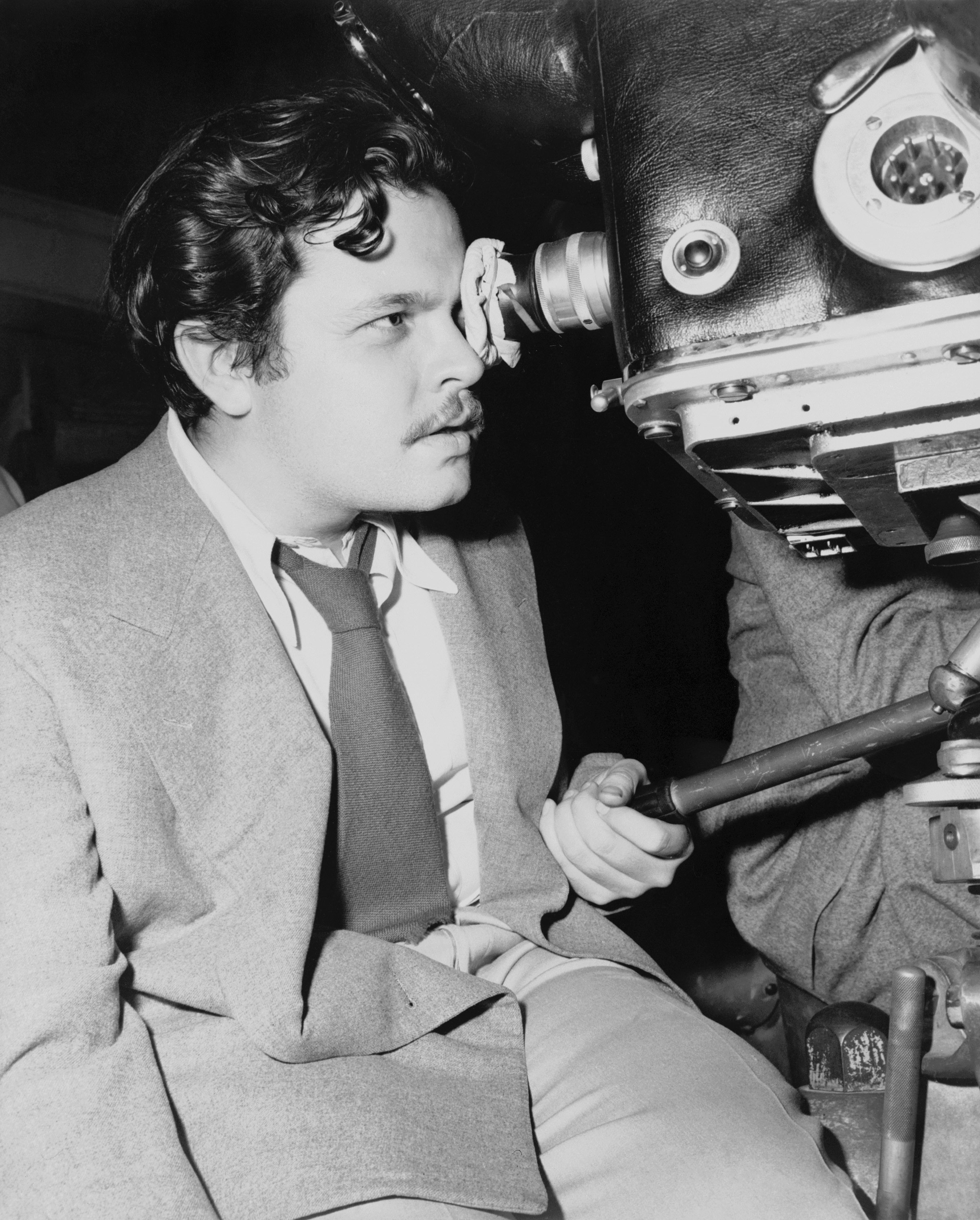
Welles at work on The Magnificent Ambersons (1942)

"The fate of The Magnificent Ambersons is one of film history's great tragedies," wrote film historian Robert L. Carringer. It was Welles's second film for RKO, adapted by Welles from Booth Tarkington's Pulitzer Prize-winning 1918 novel about the declining fortunes of a wealthy Midwestern family and the social changes brought by the automobile age. Toland was unavailable, so Stanley Cortez was named cinematographer. The meticulous Cortez worked slowly and the film lagged behind schedule and over budget. In contract renegotiations with RKO over a film he was obliged to direct, Welles had conceded final cut.

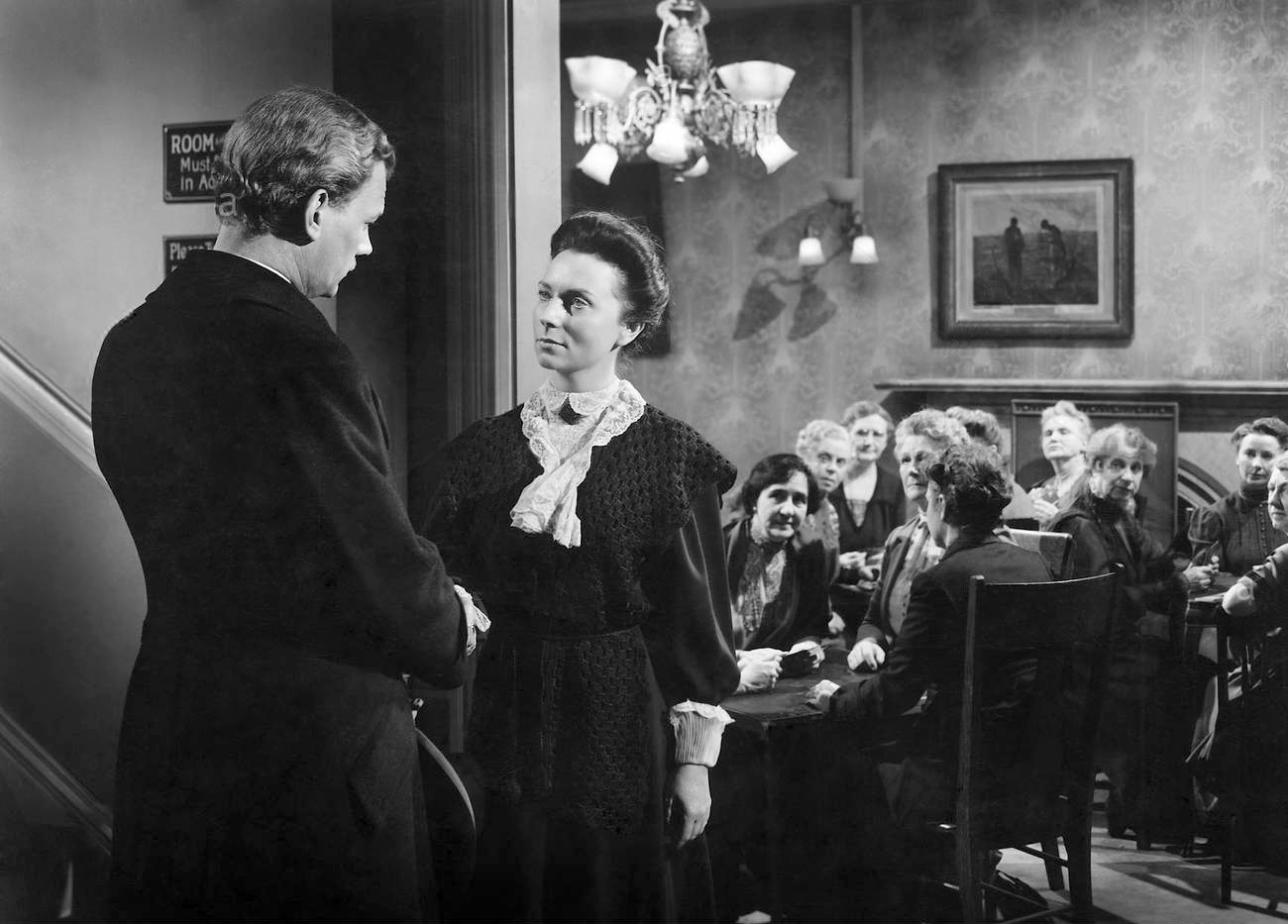
Promotional photograph of Joseph Cotten and Agnes Moorehead in the excised concluding scene of The Magnificent Ambersons

The Magnificent Ambersons was in production October 28, 1941, to January 22, 1942, with a cast including Cotten, Collins, Moorehead, Dolores Costello, Anne Baxter and Tim Holt. RKO chief George Schaefer understood that presenting a downbeat period film without marquee stars was a risk, but he was reassured by a special screening of the film-in-progress Welles arranged for him on November 28. Schaefer was an expert in film distribution and attended to the marketing strategy.

Required to start filming the "Carnaval" segment of It's All True in early February 1942, Welles rushed to edit The Magnificent Ambersons and finish his acting scenes in Journey into Fear. He ended his lucrative CBS radio show February 2, flew to Washington, D.C., for a briefing, and then lashed together a rough cut of Ambersons in Miami with editor Robert Wise.

A finished 131-minute version, edited per Welles's detailed instructions, was previewed March 17, 1942, in Pomona. Schaefer was present, and was rattled by the audience response: 75 percent of the preview cards were negative. The film was received more favorably by a preview audience in the more upscale Pasadena on March 19, with only 25 percent of the preview cards negative. But the experience led Schaefer to authorize the studio to make whatever changes necessary to make The Magnificent Ambersons a commercial success.

Wise, whom Welles had left in charge of postproduction, removed nearly 50 minutes of footage from Welles's cut, and several scenes—including the ending—were rewritten and reshot. Over Welles's opposition, The Magnificent Ambersons was cut to 88 minutes. Like the film, Bernard Herrmann's score was heavily edited by RKO. When more than half the score was removed and replaced by music by Roy Webb, Herrmann bitterly severed his ties with the film and promised legal action if he was not removed from the credits.

Even in its released form, The Magnificent Ambersons is considered one of the best films of all time. The film was nominated for four Academy Awards, including Best Picture, and added to the National Film Registry in 1991.

==== Journey into Fear ====
At RKO's request, Welles worked on an adaptation of Eric Ambler's spy thriller Journey into Fear, co-written with Cotten. In addition to acting in it, Welles was the producer. Direction was credited to Norman Foster. Welles later said they were in such a rush that the director of each scene was determined by whoever was closest to the camera. Journey into Fear was in production January 6 – March 12, 1942.

==== It's All True ====
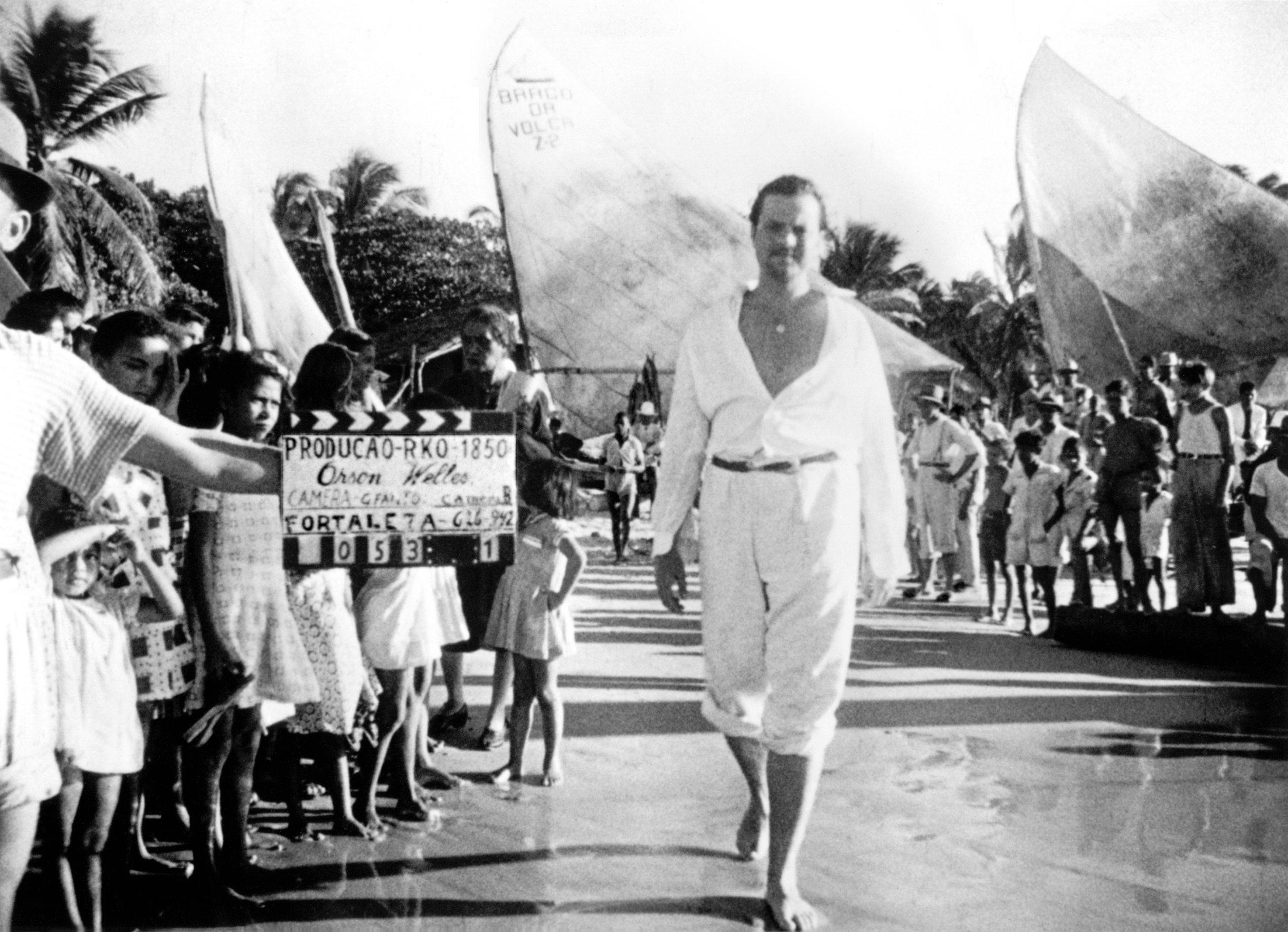
Welles on location in Fortaleza, Brazil, while filming the "Jangadeiros" section of the unfinished film It's All True

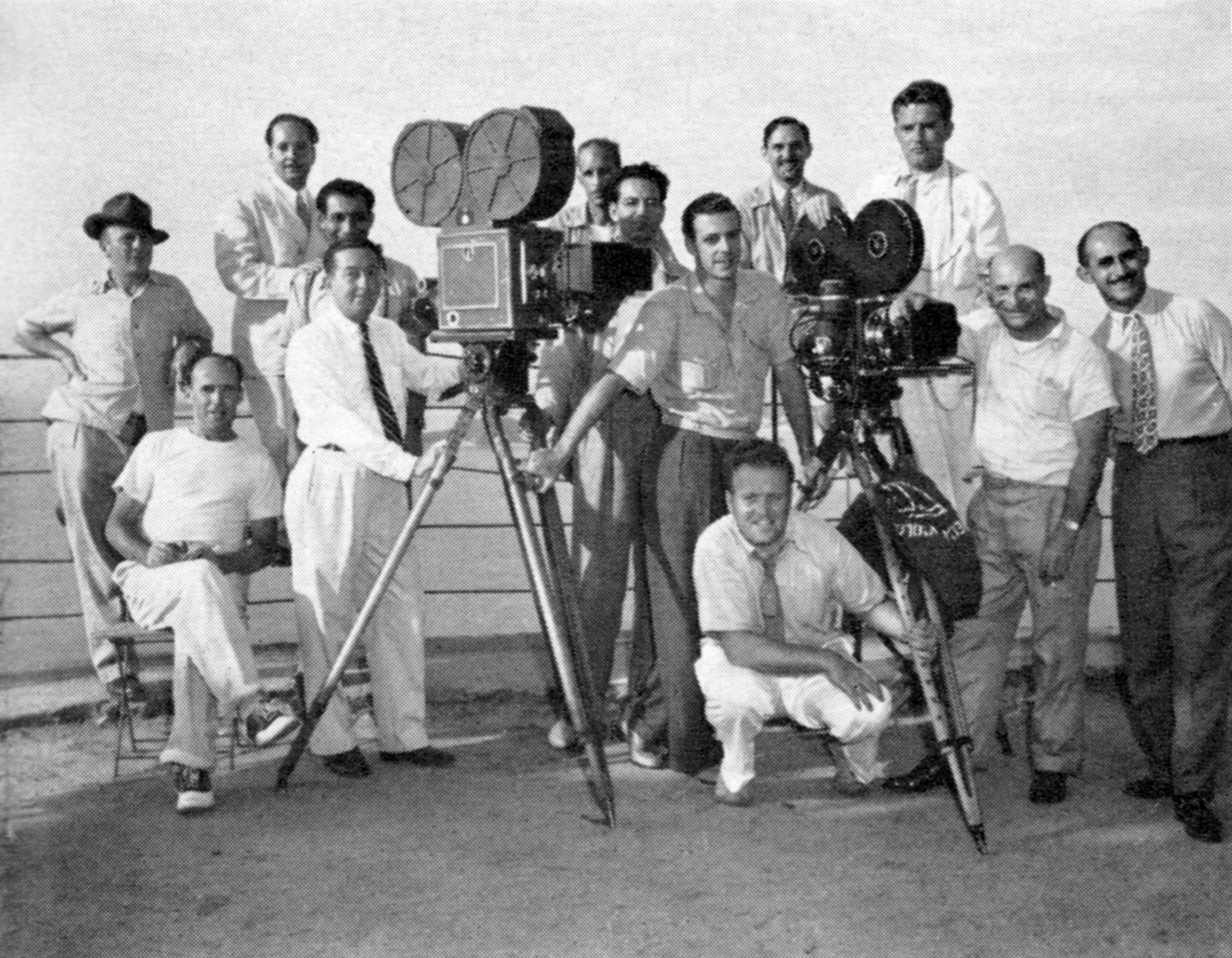
Some of Welles's It's All True film crew at the top of Sugarloaf Mountain, Rio de Janeiro, in early 1942

In July 1941, Welles conceived It's All True as an omnibus film mixing documentary and docufiction in a project that emphasized the dignity of labor and celebrated the cultural and ethnic diversity of North America. It was to have been his third film for RKO, following Citizen Kane (1941) and The Magnificent Ambersons (1942). Duke Ellington was put under contract to score a segment with the working title, "The Story of Jazz", drawn from Louis Armstrong's 1936 autobiography, Swing That Music. Armstrong was cast to play himself in the dramatization of the history of jazz performance, from its roots to its place in American culture. "The Story of Jazz" was to go into production in December 1941. Welles's own expectations for the film were modest. "It's All True was not going to make any cinematic history, nor was it intended to," he later said. "It was intended to be a perfectly honorable execution of my job as a goodwill ambassador, bringing entertainment to the Northern Hemisphere that showed them something about the Southern one."

Mercury Productions purchased the stories for other segments—"My Friend Bonito" and "The Captain's Chair"—from documentary filmmaker Robert J. Flaherty. Adapted by Norman Foster and John Fante, "My Friend Bonito" was the only segment of the original It's All True to go into production. Filming took place in Mexico September–December 1941, with Norman Foster directing under Welles's supervision.

In December 1941, the Office of the Coordinator of Inter-American Affairs asked Welles to make a film in Brazil that would showcase the Carnaval in Rio. With filming of "My Friend Bonito" about two-thirds complete, Welles decided he could shift the geography of It's All True and incorporate Flaherty's story into an omnibus film about Latin America—supporting the Roosevelt administration's Good Neighbor policy, which Welles advocated. In this revised concept, "The Story of Jazz" was replaced by the story of samba, a musical form with a comparable history and one that came to fascinate Welles. He decided to do a ripped-from-the-headlines episode about the epic voyage of four poor Brazilian fishermen, the jangadeiros, who had become national heroes. Welles later said this was the most valuable story.

Required to film the Carnaval in Rio in early February 1942, Welles rushed to edit The Magnificent Ambersons and finish his acting scenes in Journey into Fear. He ended his lucrative CBS radio show February 2, flew to Washington, D.C., for a briefing, and then lashed together a rough cut of Ambersons in Miami with editor Robert Wise. Welles recorded the film's narration the night before he left for South America: "I went to the projection room at about four in the morning, did the whole thing, and then got on the plane and off to Rio—and the end of civilization as we know it."

Welles left for Brazil on February 4 and began filming in Rio on February 8, 1942. It did not seem that Welles's other film projects would be disrupted, but as film historian Catherine L. Benamou wrote, "the ambassadorial appointment would be the first in a series of turning points leading—in 'zigs' and 'zags,' rather than in a straight line—to Welles's loss of complete directorial control over The Magnificent Ambersons and It's All True, the cancellation of his contract at RKO Radio Studio, the expulsion of his company Mercury Productions from the RKO lot, and the total suspension of It's All True."

In 1942 RKO Pictures underwent changes under new management. Nelson Rockefeller, the primary backer of the Brazil project, left its board, and Welles's principal sponsor at RKO, studio president George Schaefer, resigned. RKO took control of Ambersons and edited it into what RKO considered a commercial format. Welles's attempts to protect his version failed. In South America, Welles requested resources to finish It's All True. Given a limited amount of black-and-white film stock and a silent camera, he was able to finish shooting the episode about the jangadeiros, but RKO refused to support further production.

"So I was fired from RKO," Welles recalled. "And they made a great publicity point of the fact that I had gone to South America without a script and thrown all this money away. I never recovered from that attack." Later in 1942, when RKO Pictures began promoting its new corporate motto, "Showmanship In Place of Genius: A New Deal at RKO", Welles understood it as a reference to him.

==== First return to radio ====
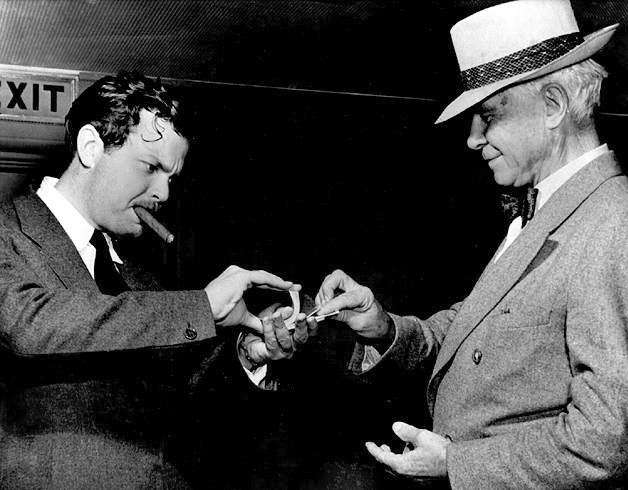
Welles performs a card trick for Carl Sandburg before the War Bond drive broadcast I Pledge America (August 1942).

Welles returned to the US on August 22, 1942, after more than six months in South America. A week after his return he produced and emceed the first two hours of a seven-hour coast-to-coast War Bond drive broadcast titled I Pledge America. Airing August 29, 1942, on the Blue Network, the program was presented in cooperation with the United States Department of the Treasury, Western Union and the American Women's Voluntary Services. Featuring 21 dance bands and a score of stage and screen and radio stars, the broadcast raised more than $10 million—more than $146 million today—for the war effort.

On October 12, 1942, Cavalcade of America presented Welles's radio play, Admiral of the Ocean Sea, an entertaining and factual look at the legend of Christopher Columbus. "It belongs to a period when hemispheric unity was a crucial matter and many programs were being devoted to the common heritage of the Americas," wrote broadcasting historian Erik Barnouw. "Many such programs were being translated into Spanish and Portuguese and broadcast to Latin America, to counteract many years of successful Axis propaganda to that area. The Axis, trying to stir Latin America against Anglo-America, had constantly emphasized the differences between the two. It became the job of American radio to emphasize their common experience and essential unity."

Admiral of the Ocean Sea, also known as Columbus Day, begins with the words, "Hello Americans"—the title Welles would choose for his own series five weeks later.

Hello Americans, a CBS Radio series broadcast November 15, 1942 – January 31, 1943, was produced, directed and hosted by Welles under the auspices of the Office of the Coordinator for Inter-American Affairs. The 30-minute weekly program promoted inter-American understanding and friendship, drawing upon the research amassed for the ill-fated film, It's All True. The series was produced concurrently with Welles's other CBS series, Ceiling Unlimited (November 9, 1942 – February 1, 1943), sponsored by the Lockheed-Vega Corporation. The program was conceived to glorify the aviation industry and dramatize its role in World War II. Welles's shows were regarded as significant contributions to the war effort. Throughout the war Welles worked on patriotic radio programs including Command Performance, G.I. Journal, Mail Call, Nazi Eyes on Canada, Stage Door Canteen and Treasury Star Parade.

==== The Mercury Wonder Show ====
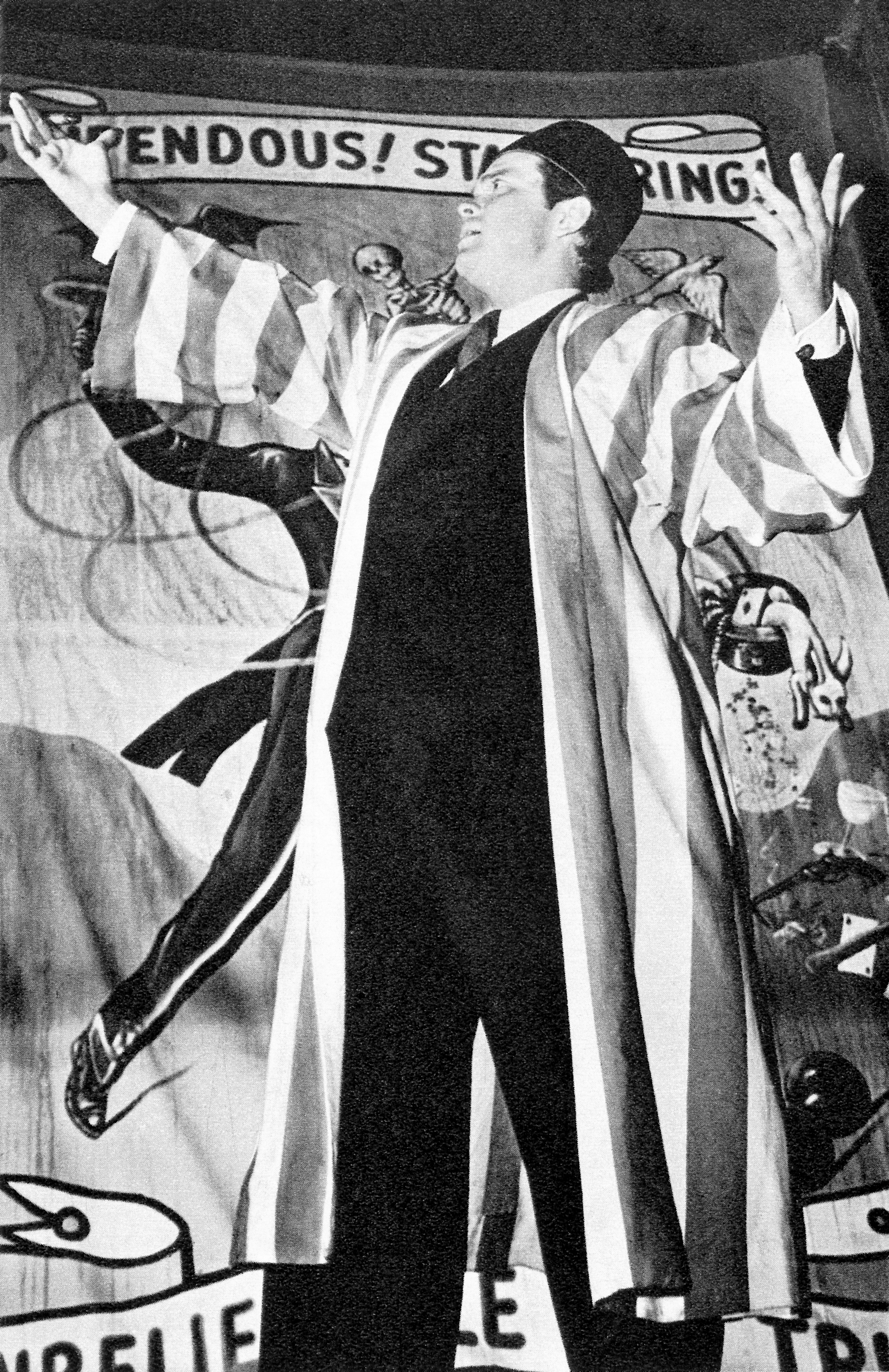
"Hello, suckers!" Orson the Magnificent welcomes the audience to The Mercury Wonder Show (August 1943).

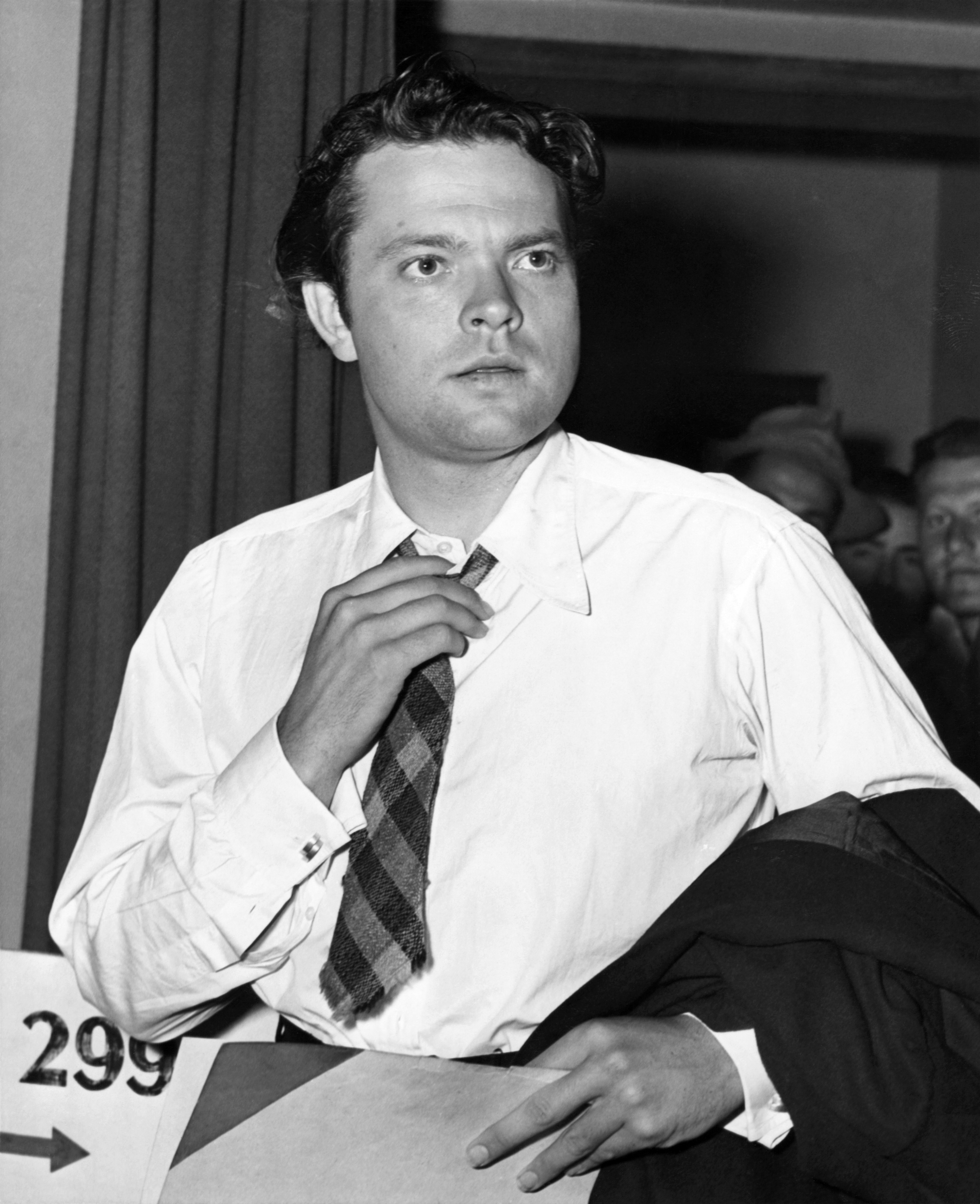
Welles leaves his Army physical after being judged unfit for military service (May 6, 1943).

In early 1943, the two concurrent radio series (Ceiling Unlimited, Hello Americans) that Welles created for CBS to support the war effort had ended. Filming had wrapped on the 1943 film adaptation of Jane Eyre, for which he received $100,000; that fee, in addition to the income from his guest-star roles in radio, made it possible for Welles to fulfill a lifelong dream. He approached the War Assistance League of Southern California and proposed a show that evolved into a big-top spectacle, part circus and part magic show. He offered his services as magician and director, and invested $40,000 in an extravaganza he co-produced with his friend Cotten: The Mercury Wonder Show for Service Men. Members of the armed forces were admitted free of charge, while the public had to pay. The show entertained 1,000 service members each night, and proceeds went to the War Assistance League, a charity for military service personnel.

The development of the show coincided with the resolution of Welles's oft-changing draft status in May 1943, when he was finally declared 4-F—unfit for military service—for medical reasons. "I felt guilty about the war," Welles told biographer Barbara Leaming. "I was guilt-ridden about my civilian status." He had been publicly hounded about his patriotism since Citizen Kane, when the Hearst press began persistent inquiries about why Welles had not been drafted.

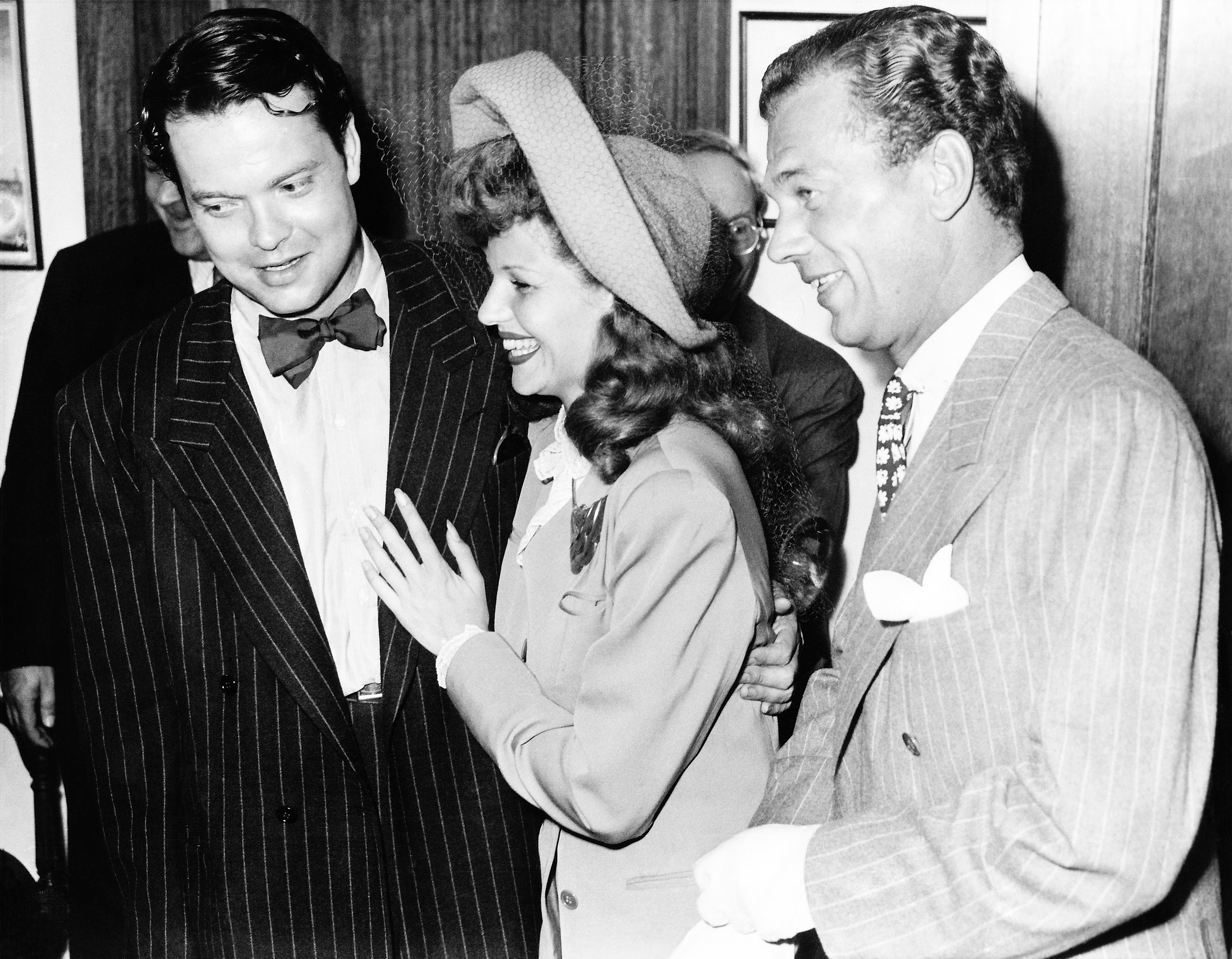
Rita Hayworth took a lunch-hour break from the set of Cover Girl to marry Welles, with best man Cotten (September 7, 1943).

The Mercury Wonder Show ran August 3 – September 9, 1943, in an 80-by-120-foot tent located at 900 Cahuenga Boulevard, in the heart of Hollywood. At intermission on September 7, 1943, KMPC radio interviewed audience and cast members of The Mercury Wonder Show—including Welles and Rita Hayworth, who were married earlier that day. Welles remarked that The Mercury Wonder Show had been performed for 48,000 members of the armed forces.

==== Second return to radio ====
The idea of doing a radio variety show occurred to Welles after his success as substitute host of consecutive episodes (March 14 – April 4, 1943) of The Jack Benny Program, radio's most popular show, when Benny contracted pneumonia on a performance tour of military bases. A half-hour variety show broadcast January 26 – July 19, 1944, on the Columbia Pacific Network, The Orson Welles Almanac presented sketch comedy, magic, mindreading, music and readings from classic works. Many of the shows originated on U.S. military camps, where Welles and his repertory company and guests entertained the troops with a reduced version of The Mercury Wonder Show. The performances of the all-star jazz group Welles brought together for the show were so popular that the band became a regular feature and was an important force in reviving interest in traditional New Orleans jazz.

Welles was placed on the U.S. Treasury payroll on May 15, 1944, as an expert consultant for the duration of the war, with a retainer of $1 a year. On the recommendation of President Franklin D. Roosevelt, Secretary of the Treasury Henry Morgenthau asked Welles to lead the Fifth War Loan Drive, which opened June 12 with a radio show on all four networks, broadcast from Texarkana, Texas. Including a statement by the President, the program defined the causes of the war and encouraged Americans to buy $16 billion in bonds to finance the Normandy landings. Welles produced additional war loan drive broadcasts on June 14 from the Hollywood Bowl, and June 16 from Soldier Field, Chicago. Americans purchased $21 billion in War Bonds during the Fifth War Loan Drive, which ended on July 8, 1944.

Welles campaigned ardently for Roosevelt in 1944. A longtime supporter and campaign speaker for FDR, he occasionally sent the president ideas and phrases that were sometimes incorporated into what Welles characterized as "less important speeches". One of these was the joke in what came to be called the Fala speech, Roosevelt's nationally broadcast September 23 address to the International Teamsters Union which opened the 1944 presidential campaign.

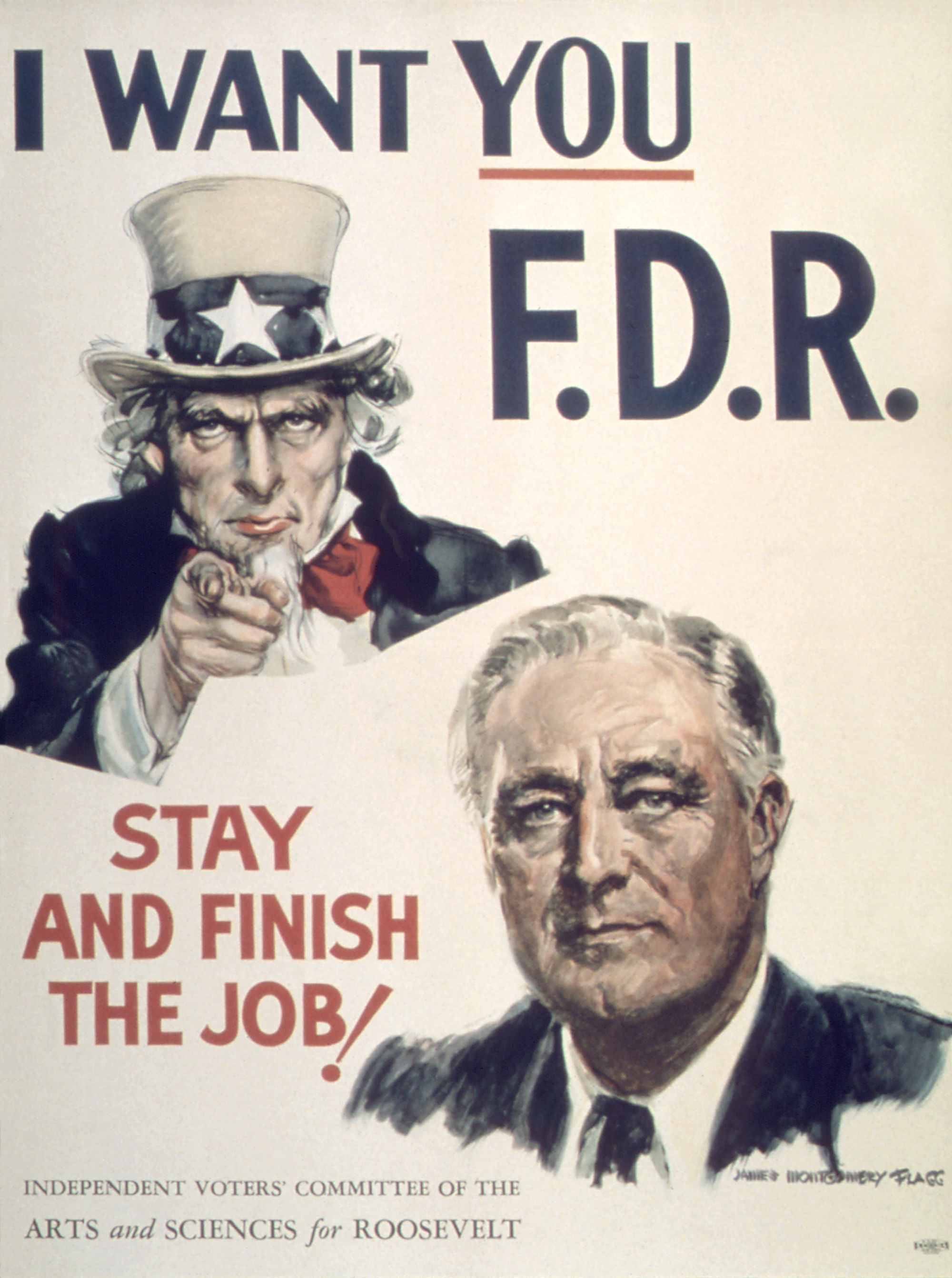
Welles introduced Vice President Henry A. Wallace at a Madison Square Garden rally advocating a fourth term for President Franklin D. Roosevelt (September 21, 1944).

Welles campaigned for the Roosevelt–Truman ticket almost full-time in the fall of 1944, traveling to nearly every state to the detriment of his health and at his own expense. In addition to his radio addresses he filled in for Roosevelt, opposite Republican presidential nominee Thomas E. Dewey, at The New York Herald Tribune Forum broadcast October 18 on the Blue Network. Welles accompanied FDR to his last campaign rally, speaking at an event November 4 at Boston's Fenway Park before 40,000 people, and took part in a historic election-eve campaign broadcast November 6 on all four radio networks.

On November 21, 1944, Welles began his association with This Is My Best, a CBS radio series he would produce, direct, write and host (March 13 – April 24, 1945). He wrote a political column called Orson Welles' Almanac (later titled Orson Welles Today) for The New York Post January–November 1945, and advocated the continuation of FDR's New Deal policies and international vision, particularly the establishment of the UN and world peace.

On April 12, 1945, the day Roosevelt died, the Blue-ABC network marshalled its executive staff and national leaders to pay homage to the president. "Among the outstanding programs which attracted wide attention was a special tribute delivered by Orson Welles", reported Broadcasting magazine. Welles spoke at 10:10 p.m., Eastern War Time, from Hollywood, and stressed the importance of continuing FDR's work: "He has no need for homage and we who loved him have no time for tears ... Our fighting sons and brothers cannot pause tonight to mark the death of him whose name will be given to the age we live in." Welles presented another special broadcast on the evening following Roosevelt's death: "We must move on beyond mere death to that free world which was the hope and labor of his life."

He dedicated the April 17 episode of This Is My Best to Roosevelt and the future of America on the eve of the United Nations Conference on International Organization. Welles was an advisor and correspondent for the Blue-ABC radio network's coverage of the San Francisco conference that formed the UN, taking place April 24 – June 23, 1945. He presented a half-hour dramatic program written by Ben Hecht on the opening day of the conference, and on Sunday afternoons (April 29 – June 10) he led a weekly discussion from the San Francisco Civic Auditorium.

==== The Stranger ====
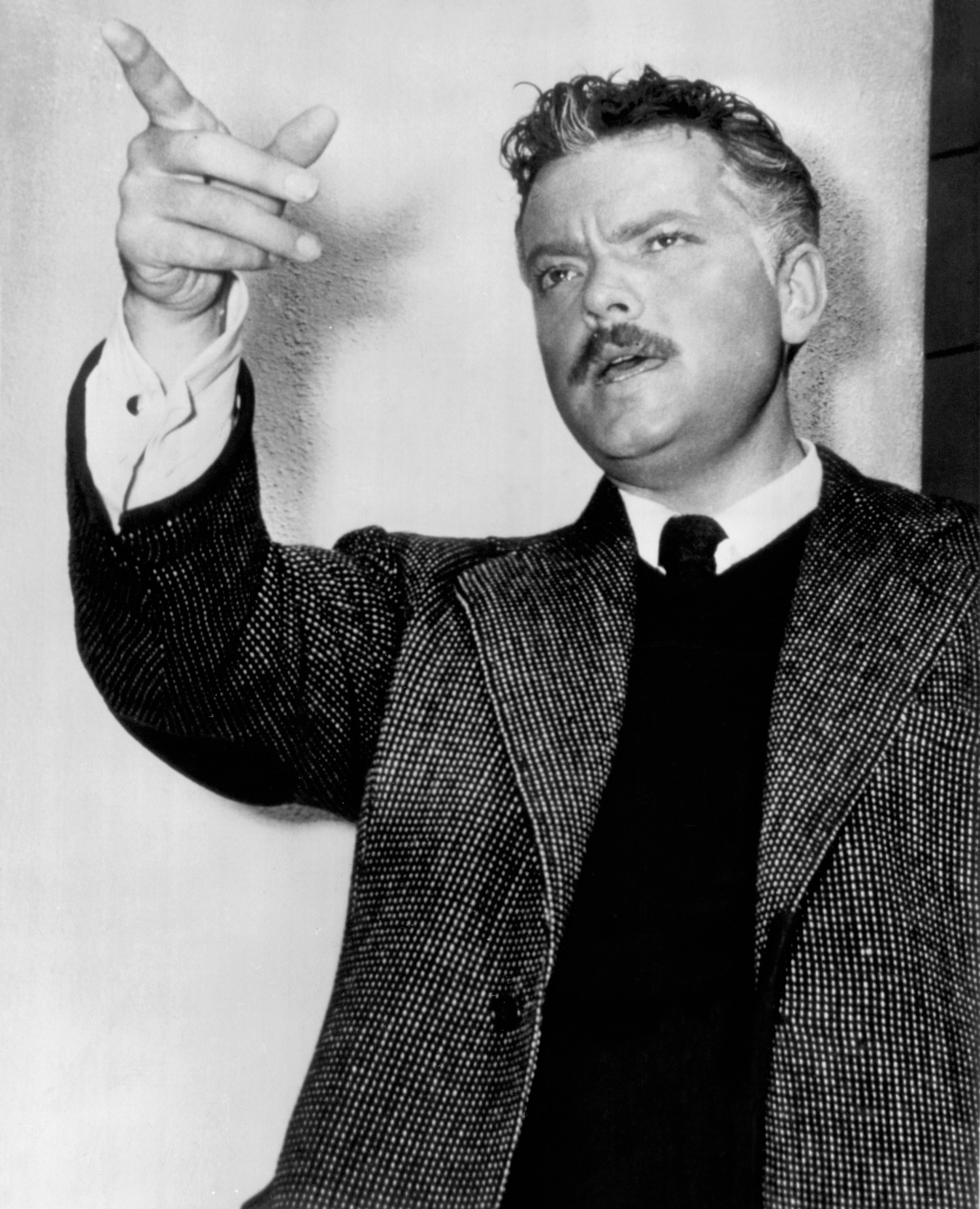
Director and star Orson Welles at work on The Stranger (October 1945)

In the fall of 1945 Welles began work on The Stranger (1946), a film noir drama about a war crimes investigator who tracks a high-ranking Nazi fugitive to an idyllic New England town. Edward G. Robinson, Loretta Young and Welles star.

Producer Sam Spiegel initially planned to hire director John Huston, who had rewritten the screenplay by Anthony Veiller. When Huston entered the military, Welles was given the chance to direct and prove himself able to make a film on schedule and under budget—something he was so eager to do that he accepted a disadvantageous contract. One of its concessions was that he would defer to the studio in any creative dispute.

The Stranger was Welles's first job as a film director in four years. He was told that if the film was successful he could sign a four-picture deal with International Pictures, making films of his own choosing. Welles was given some creative control, and endeavored to personalize the film and develop a nightmarish tone. He worked on the general rewrite of the script and wrote scenes at the beginning of the picture shot, but cut by producers. He filmed in long takes that largely thwarted the control given to editor Ernest J. Nims under the terms of the contract.

The Stranger was the first commercial film to use documentary footage from the concentration camps. Welles had seen the footage in early May 1945 in San Francisco, as a correspondent and discussion moderator at the UN Conference on International Organization. He wrote of the Holocaust footage in his syndicated New York Post column May 7, 1945.

Completed a day ahead of schedule and under budget, The Stranger was the only film made by Welles to have been a bona fide box office success upon its release. Its cost was $1.03 million; 15 months after its release it had grossed $3.2 million. Within weeks of the completion of the film, International Pictures backed out of its promised four-picture deal with Welles. No reason was given, but the impression was left that The Stranger would not make money.

==== Around the World ====
In the summer of 1946, Welles moved to New York to direct the Broadway musical Around the World, a stage adaptation of Jules Verne's novel Around the World in Eighty Days with a book by Welles and music by Cole Porter. Producer Mike Todd, who would produce the successful 1956 film adaptation, pulled out from the lavish and expensive production, leaving Welles to support the finances. When Welles ran out of money he convinced Columbia Pictures president Harry Cohn to send enough to continue the show, and in exchange Welles promised to write, produce, direct and star in a film for Cohn for no further fee. The stage show soon failed due to poor box-office, with Welles unable to claim the losses on his taxes. Inspired by magician and cinema pioneer Georges Méliès, the show required 55 stagehands and used films to bridge scenes. Welles said it was his favorite of his stage productions. Regarding its extravagance, critic Robert Garland said it had "everything but the kitchen sink." The next night, Welles brought out a kitchen sink.

==== Third return to radio ====
In 1946, Welles began two new radio series—The Mercury Summer Theatre of the Air for CBS, and Orson Welles Commentaries for ABC. While Mercury Summer Theatre featured half-hour adaptations of some classic Mercury radio shows from the 1930s, the first episode was a condensation of his Around the World stage play, and is the only record of Cole Porter's music for the project. Several original Mercury actors returned for the series, as well as Bernard Herrmann. Welles invested his earnings into his failing stage play. Commentaries was a political vehicle, continuing the themes from his New York Post column. Again, Welles lacked a clear focus, until the NAACP brought to his attention the case of Isaac Woodard. Welles brought significant attention to Woodard's cause.

The last broadcast of Orson Welles Commentaries on October 6, 1946, marked the end of Welles's own radio shows.

==== The Lady from Shanghai ====
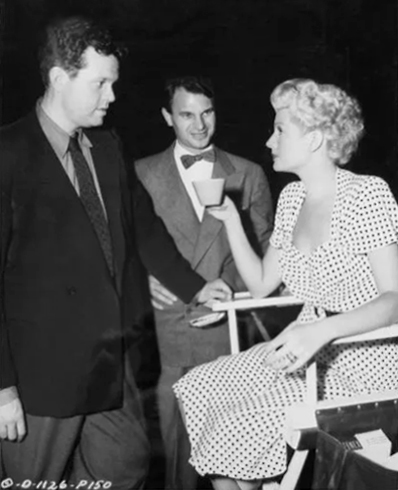
Welles, associate producer Richard Wilson and Rita Hayworth confer on the set of The Lady from Shanghai (1947)

The film that Welles was obliged to make in exchange for Harry Cohn's help in financing the stage production Around the World was The Lady from Shanghai, filmed in 1947 for Columbia Pictures. Welles intended it to be a modest thriller, but the budget skyrocketed after Cohn suggested that Welles's then-estranged wife Rita Hayworth star.

Cohn disliked Welles's rough cut, particularly the confusing plot and lack of close-ups, and was not in sympathy with Welles's Brechtian use of irony and black comedy, especially in a farcical courtroom scene. Cohn ordered extensive editing and re-shoots. After heavy editing by the studio, approximately one hour of Welles's first cut was removed, including much of a climactic confrontation scene in an amusement park funhouse. While expressing displeasure at the cuts, Welles was particularly appalled with the score. The film was considered a disaster in America when released, though the closing shootout in a hall of mirrors (the use of mirrors being a recurrent motif of Welles's, starting with Kane) has become a touchstone of film noir. Not long after release, Welles and Hayworth finalized their divorce.

Although The Lady from Shanghai was acclaimed in Europe, it was not embraced until decades later in the U.S., where it is now regarded as a classic of film noir.

==== Macbeth ====
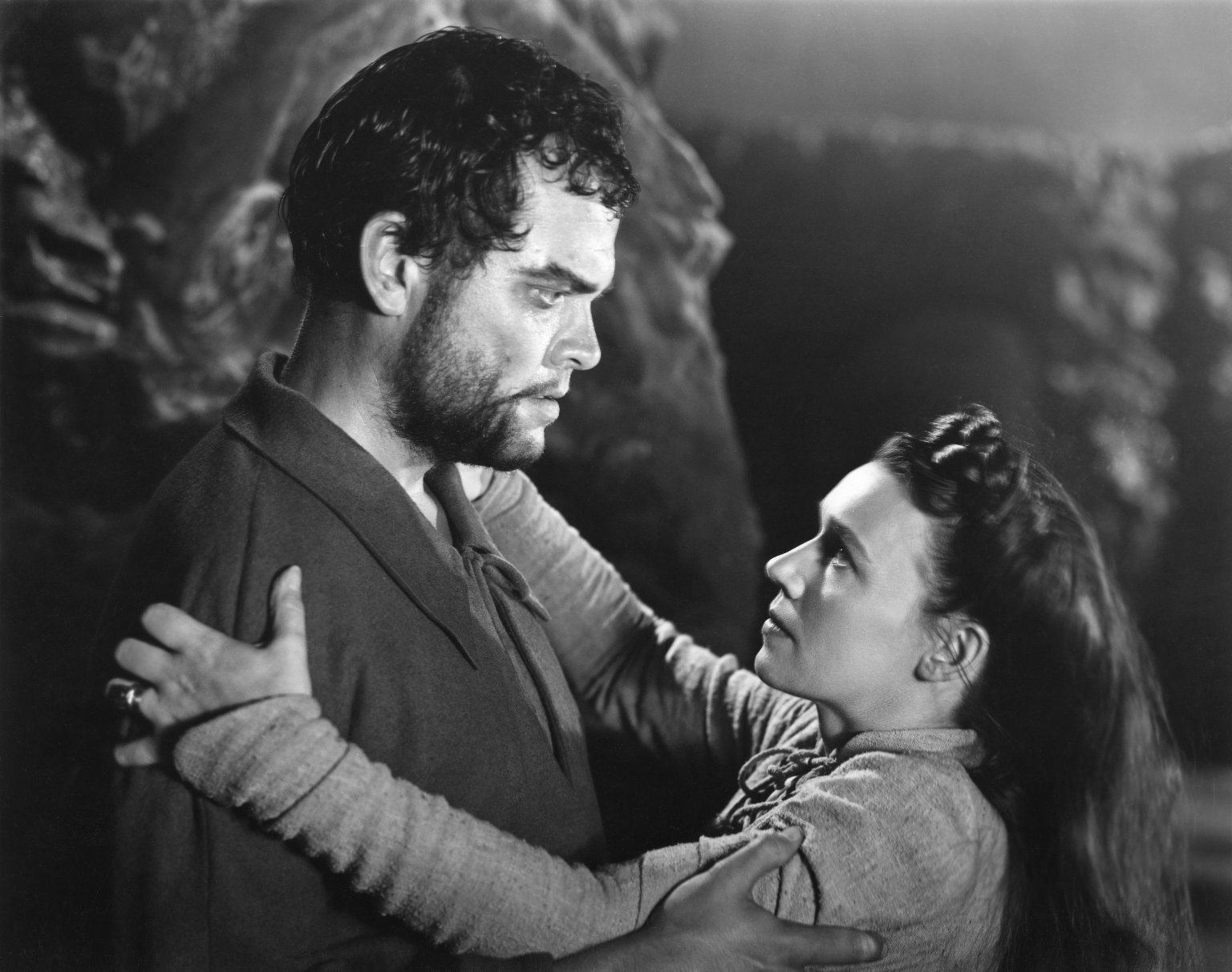
Welles and Jeanette Nolan in Macbeth

Prior to 1948, Welles convinced Republic Pictures to let him direct a low-budget version of Macbeth, featuring highly stylized sets and costumes, and a cast of actors lip-syncing to a pre-recorded soundtrack, one of many innovative cost-cutting techniques Welles deployed in an attempt to make an epic film from B-movie resources. The script, adapted by Welles, is a violent reworking of Shakespeare's original, freely cutting and pasting lines into new contexts via a collage technique and recasting Macbeth as a clash of pagan and proto-Christian ideologies. Some voodoo trappings of the famous Welles/Houseman Negro Theatre stage adaptation are visible, especially in the film's characterization of the Weird Sisters, who create an effigy of Macbeth as a charm to enchant him. Of all Welles's post-Kane Hollywood productions, Macbeth is stylistically closest to Kane in its long takes and deep focus photography.

Republic initially trumpeted the film as an important work but decided it did not care for the Scottish accents and held up general release for a year after early negative press reaction, including Life's comment that Welles's film "doth foully slaughter Shakespeare." Welles left for Europe, while co-producer and lifelong supporter Richard Wilson reworked the soundtrack. Welles returned and cut 20 minutes from the film at Republic's request and recorded narration to cover gaps. The film was decried as a disaster. Macbeth had influential fans in Europe, especially the French poet and filmmaker Jean Cocteau, who hailed the film's "crude, irreverent power" and careful shot design, and described the characters as haunting "the corridors of some dreamlike subway, an abandoned coal mine, and ruined cellars oozing with water."

=== Early work in Europe (1948–1956) ===
In Italy he starred as Cagliostro in the 1949 film Black Magic. His co-star, Akim Tamiroff, impressed Welles so much that Tamiroff would appear in four of Welles's productions during the 1950s and 60s.

The following year, Welles starred as Harry Lime in Carol Reed's The Third Man, alongside Cotten, his friend and co-star from Citizen Kane, with a script by Graham Greene and a memorable score by Anton Karas. In it, Welles makes what Roger Ebert called "the most famous entrance in the movies, and one of the most famous speeches." Greene credited the speech to Welles. Radio producer Harry Alan Towers would resurrect Lime in the radio series The Adventures of Harry Lime.

Welles appeared as Cesare Borgia in the 1949 Italian film Prince of Foxes, with Tyrone Power and Mercury Theatre alumnus Everett Sloane, and as the Mongol warrior Bayan in the 1950 film version of the novel The Black Rose.

==== Othello ====
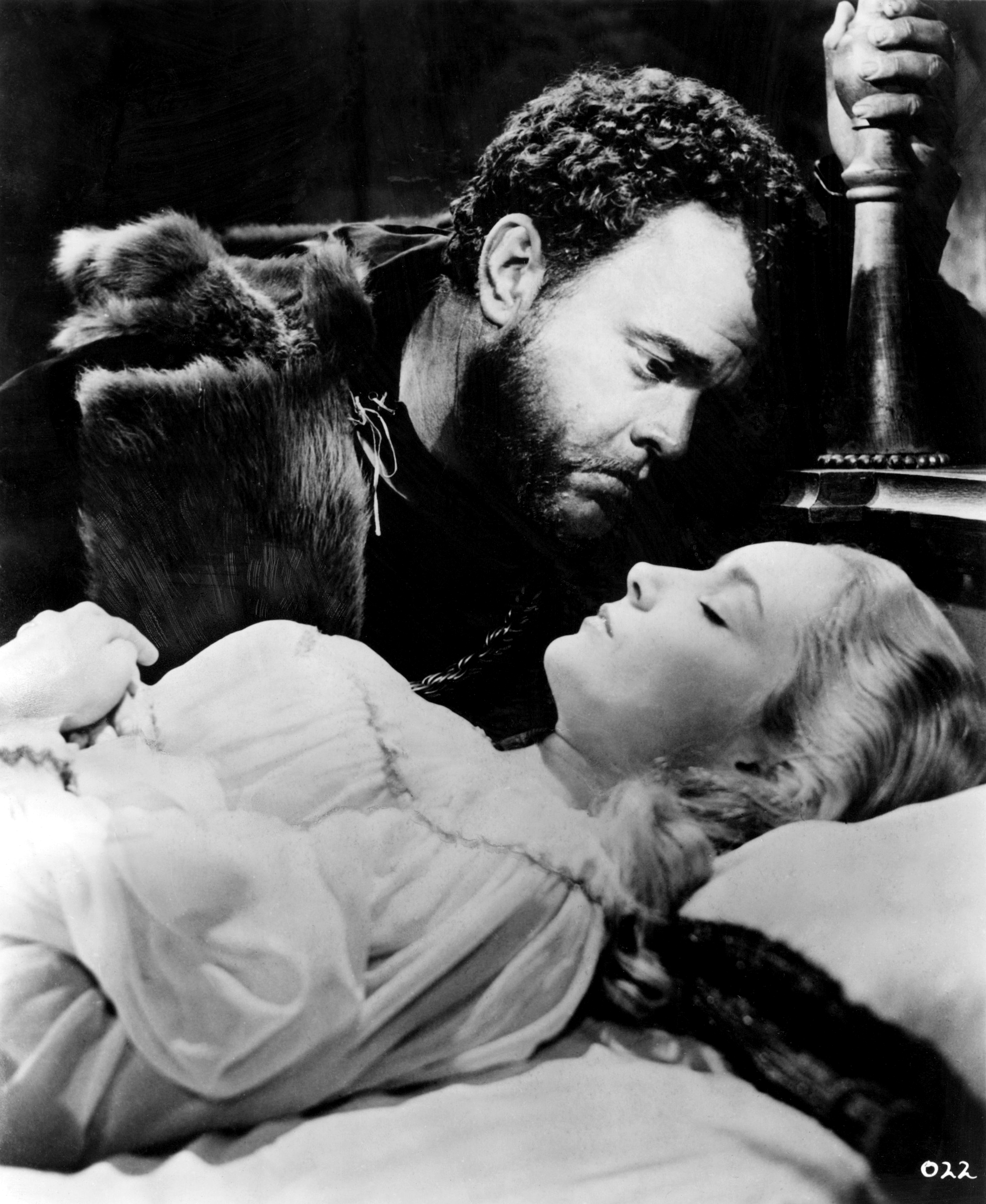
Welles and Suzanne Cloutier in Othello (1951)

During this time, Welles was channeling his money from acting jobs into a self-financed film version of Shakespeare's Othello. From 1949 to 1951, Welles worked on Othello, filming on location in Italy and Morocco. The film featured Welles's friends Micheál Mac Liammóir as Iago and Hilton Edwards as Desdemona's father Brabantio. Suzanne Cloutier starred as Desdemona and Campbell Playhouse alumnus Robert Coote appeared as Iago's associate Roderigo.

Filming was suspended several times as Welles ran out of funds and left for acting jobs, accounted in detail in MacLiammóir's memoir Put Money in Thy Purse. The American release prints had a technically flawed soundtrack, suffering from a dropout of sound at every quiet moment. Welles's daughter, Beatrice Welles-Smith, restored Othello in 1992 for a re-release. The restoration included reconstructing Angelo Francesco Lavagnino's original score, which was originally inaudible, and adding ambient stereo sound effects, which were not in the original. The restoration went on a successful theatrical run in America. David Thomson writes of Welles's Othello, "the poetry hangs in the air, like sea mist or incense." Anthony Lane writes that "Some of the action was shot in Venice, and I occasionally wonder what crept into the camera casing; the movie looks blackened and silvery, like an aged mirror, or as if the emulsion of the print were already poised to decay. You can't tell what is or isn't Shakespeare, where his influence begins and ends." The movie premiered at the Cannes Film Festival, where it won the Grand Prix (precursor of the Palme d'Or).

In 1952, Welles continued finding work in England after the success of the Harry Lime radio show. Harry Alan Towers offered Welles another series, The Black Museum, which ran a year with Welles as host and narrator. Director Herbert Wilcox offered Welles the part of the victim in Trent's Last Case, based on Edmund Clerihew Bentley's novel. In 1953, the BBC hired Welles to read an hour of selections from Walt Whitman's Song of Myself. Towers hired Welles again, to play Professor Moriarty in the radio series The Adventures of Sherlock Holmes starring John Gielgud and Ralph Richardson.

Welles briefly returned to America to make his first appearance on television, starring in the Omnibus presentation of King Lear, broadcast live on CBS October 18, 1953. Directed by Peter Brook, the production costarred Natasha Parry, Beatrice Straight and Arnold Moss.

In 1954, director George More O'Ferrall offered Welles the title role in the 'Lord Mountdrago' segment of Three Cases of Murder, co-starring Alan Badel. Herbert Wilcox cast Welles as the antagonist in Trouble in the Glen opposite Margaret Lockwood, Forrest Tucker and Victor McLaglen. Old friend John Huston cast him as Father Mapple in his 1956 film adaptation of Herman Melville's Moby-Dick, starring Gregory Peck.

==== Mr. Arkadin ====
Welles's next turn as director was Mr. Arkadin (1955), which was produced by his political mentor from the 1940s, Louis Dolivet. It was filmed in France, Germany, Spain and Italy on a limited budget. Based loosely on episodes of the Harry Lime radio show, it stars Welles as a billionaire who hires a man to delve into the secrets of his past. The film stars Robert Arden, who had worked on the Lime series; Welles's third wife, Paola Mori, whose voice was dubbed by actress Billie Whitelaw; and guest stars Akim Tamiroff, Michael Redgrave, Katina Paxinou and Mischa Auer. Frustrated by his slow progress in the editing room, producer Dolivet removed Welles from the project and finished it without him. Eventually, five different versions of the film would be released, two in Spanish and three in English. The version that Dolivet completed was retitled Confidential Report. In 2005 Stefan Droessler of the Munich Film Museum oversaw a reconstruction of the surviving film elements.

==== Television projects ====
In 1955, Welles directed two television series for the BBC. The first was Orson Welles' Sketch Book, six 15-minute shows featuring Welles drawing in a sketchbook to illustrate his reminiscences including the filming of It's All True and the Isaac Woodard case. The second was Around the World with Orson Welles, six travelogues set in locations around Europe (such as Vienna, the Basque Country, and England). Welles served as host and interviewer, his commentary including documentary facts and his observations (a technique he would continue to explore in later works).

During Episode 3 of Sketchbook, Welles attacks abuse of police powers around the world. The episode starts with him telling the story of Isaac Woodard, an African-American veteran during World War II being falsely accused by a bus driver of being drunk and disorderly, who has a policeman remove the man from the bus. Woodard is not arrested right away, but beaten unconscious nearly to death and permanently blinded. Welles assures the audience that he saw to it that justice was served to the policeman though he does not mention what justice was delivered. Welles goes on to give other examples of police being given more power and authority than is necessary. The episode is titled "The Police".

In 1956, Welles completed Portrait of Gina. He left the only copy of it in his room at the Hôtel Ritz in Paris. The film cans would remain in a lost-and-found locker at the hotel for decades, where they were discovered in 1986, after his death.

=== First return to Hollywood (1956–1959) ===
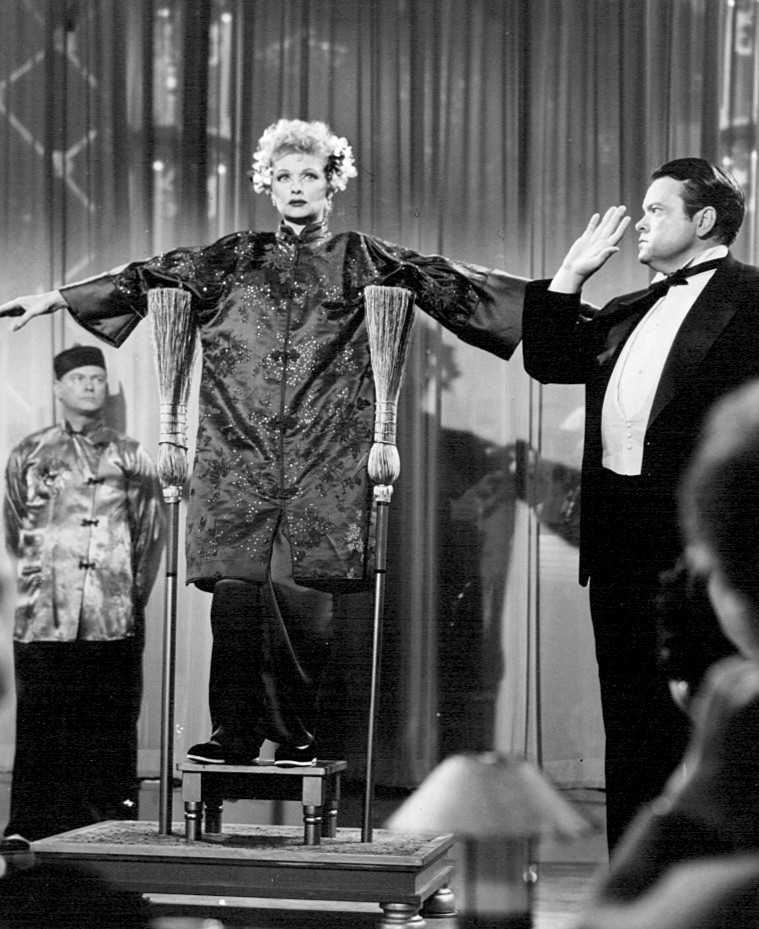
Welles the magician with Lucille Ball in I Love Lucy (October 15, 1956)

In 1956, Welles returned to Hollywood. He began filming a projected pilot for Desilu, owned by Lucille Ball and her husband Desi Arnaz, who had purchased the former RKO studios. The film was The Fountain of Youth, based on a story by John Collier. Originally deemed not viable as a pilot, the film was not aired until 1958—and won the Peabody Award for excellence.

Welles guest-starred on television shows including I Love Lucy. On radio, he was narrator of Tomorrow (October 17, 1956), a nuclear holocaust drama produced and syndicated by ABC and the Federal Civil Defense Administration. Welles's next feature role was in Man in the Shadow for Universal Pictures in 1957, starring Jeff Chandler.

==== Touch of Evil ====
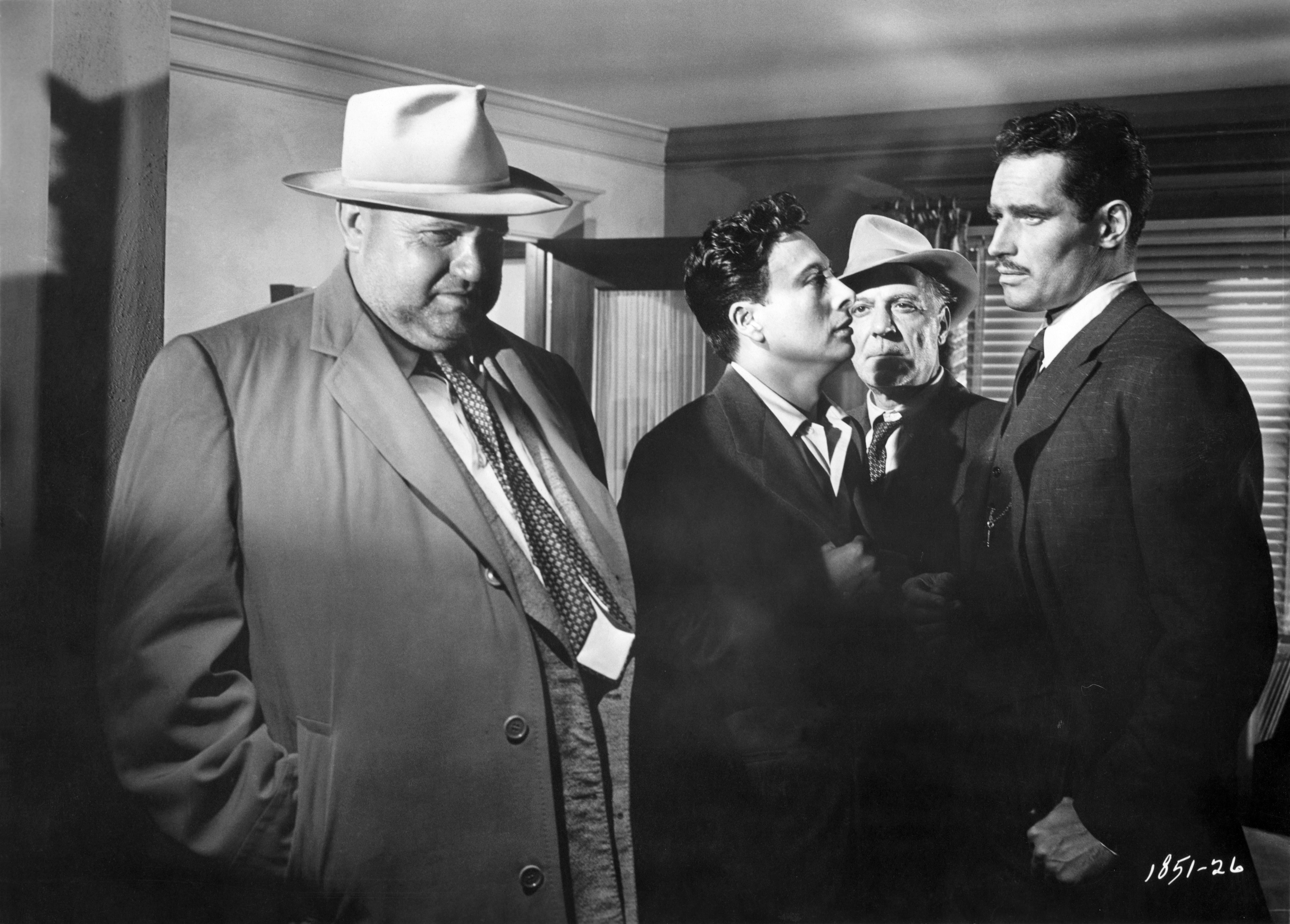
Welles, Victor Millan, Joseph Calleia and Charlton Heston in Touch of Evil (1958)

Welles stayed on at Universal to co-star with Charlton Heston in Touch of Evil, based on Whit Masterson's novel Badge of Evil. Originally hired as an actor, Welles was promoted to director by Universal Studios at the insistence of Heston. The film reunited actors and technicians with whom Welles had worked in Hollywood in the 1940s, including cameraman Russell Metty (The Stranger), makeup artist Maurice Seiderman (Citizen Kane), and actors Cotten, Marlene Dietrich and Akim Tamiroff. Filming proceeded smoothly, with Welles finishing on schedule and budget, and the studio bosses praising the daily rushes. Nevertheless, after production, the studio re-edited the film, re-shot scenes, and shot new exposition scenes to clarify the plot. Welles wrote a 58-page memo outlining suggestions and objections, stating that the film was no longer his version—it was the studio's, but as such, he was still prepared to help with it. The movie was shown at the 1958 Brussels World's Fair, where it won the grand prize. François Truffaut saw the film in Brussels, and it influenced his debut The 400 Blows, one of the seminal films of the French New Wave.

In 1978, a longer preview version of the film was discovered and released. In 1998, Walter Murch reedited the film according to Welles's specifications in his memo. Murch said "I'm just flabbergasted when I read his memos, thinking that he was writing these ideas forty years ago, because, if I was working on a film now and a director came up with ideas like these, I'd be amazed—pleased but amazed—to realize that someone was thinking that hard about sound—which is all too rare". The film was influential in its use of a handheld camera, notably in the scene in the elevator. Murch says that "I'm sure Godard and Truffaut, who were big fans of Touch of Evil, learned from that scene how they could achieve exactly what they wanted—at once both a fresh sense of reality and ingenuity."

As Universal reworked Touch of Evil, Welles began filming his adaptation of Miguel de Cervantes's Don Quixote in Mexico, starring Mischa Auer as Quixote and Akim Tamiroff as Sancho Panza.

=== First return to Europe (1959–1970) ===
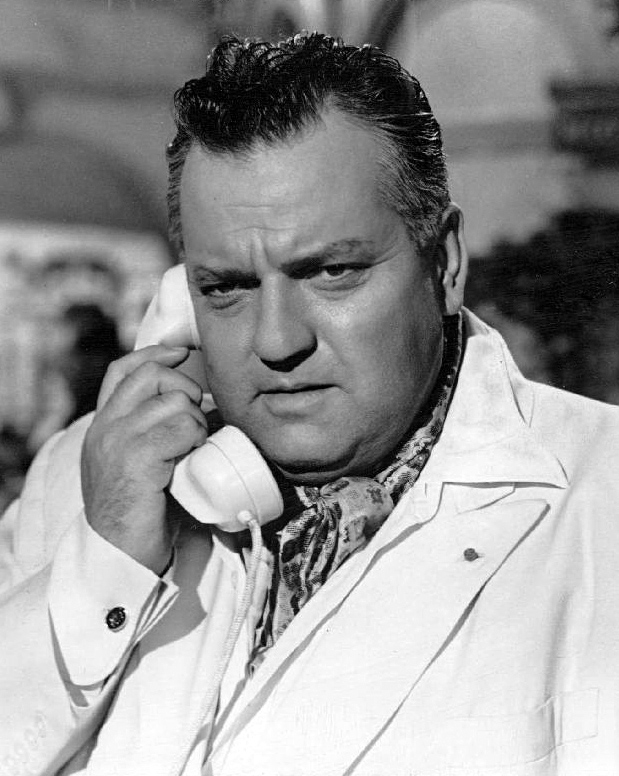
Welles in Crack in the Mirror (1960)

He continued shooting Don Quixote in Spain and Italy, but replaced Mischa Auer with Francisco Reiguera, and resumed acting jobs. In Italy in 1959, Welles directed his scenes as King Saul in Richard Pottier's film David and Goliath. In Hong Kong, he co-starred with Curt Jürgens in Lewis Gilbert's film Ferry to Hong Kong. In 1960, in Paris he co-starred in Richard Fleischer's film Crack in the Mirror. In Yugoslavia he starred in Richard Thorpe's film The Tartars and Veljko Bulajić's Battle of Neretva.

Throughout the 1960s, filming continued on Quixote on-and-off, as Welles evolved the concept, tone and ending several times. Although he had a complete version shot and edited at least once, he would continue toying with the editing well into the 1980s; he never completed a version he was fully satisfied with and would junk existing footage and shoot new footage. In one case, he had a complete cut ready in which Quixote and Sancho Panza end up going to the Moon, but felt the ending was rendered obsolete by the 1969 Moon landings and burned 10 reels of this version. As the process went on, Welles gradually voiced all the characters and provided narration. In 1992, the director Jesús Franco constructed a film out of the portions of Quixote left by Welles. Some of the film stock had decayed badly. While the Welles footage was greeted with interest, the post-production by Franco was met with criticism.

In 1961, Welles directed In the Land of Don Quixote, eight half-hour episodes for the Italian television network RAI. Similar to Around the World with Orson Welles, they presented travelogues of Spain and included Welles's wife, Paola, and their daughter, Beatrice. Though Welles was fluent in Italian, the network was not interested in him providing narration because of his accent, and the series sat unreleased until 1964, at which time the network had added its own Italian narration. Ultimately, versions of the episodes were released with the original musical score Welles had approved, but without the narration.

==== The Trial ====
In 1962, Welles directed his adaptation of The Trial, based on the novel by Franz Kafka and produced by Michael and Alexander Salkind. The cast included Jeanne Moreau, Romy Schneider, Paola Mori, Akim Tamiroff and Anthony Perkins as Josef K. While filming exteriors in Zagreb, Welles was informed that the Salkinds had run out of money, meaning there could be no set construction. No stranger to shooting on found locations, Welles soon filmed the interiors in the Gare d'Orsay, then an abandoned station in Paris. Welles thought the location possessed a "Jules Verne modernism" and a melancholy sense of "waiting", both suitable for Kafka. To remain in the spirit of Kafka, Welles set up the cutting room with the editor, Frederick Muller (as Fritz Muller), in the old unused, cold, depressing, station master office. The film failed at the box-office. Peter Bogdanovich observed that Welles found it riotously funny. Welles told a BBC interviewer that it was his best film. While filming The Trial Welles met Oja Kodar, who became his partner and collaborator for the last 20 years of his life.

Welles played a film director in La ricotta (1963), Pier Paolo Pasolini's segment of the Ro.Go.Pa.G. movie, although his renowned voice was dubbed by writer Giorgio Bassani. He continued taking what work he could find acting, narrating or hosting other people's work, and began filming Chimes at Midnight, which was completed in 1965.

==== Chimes at Midnight ====
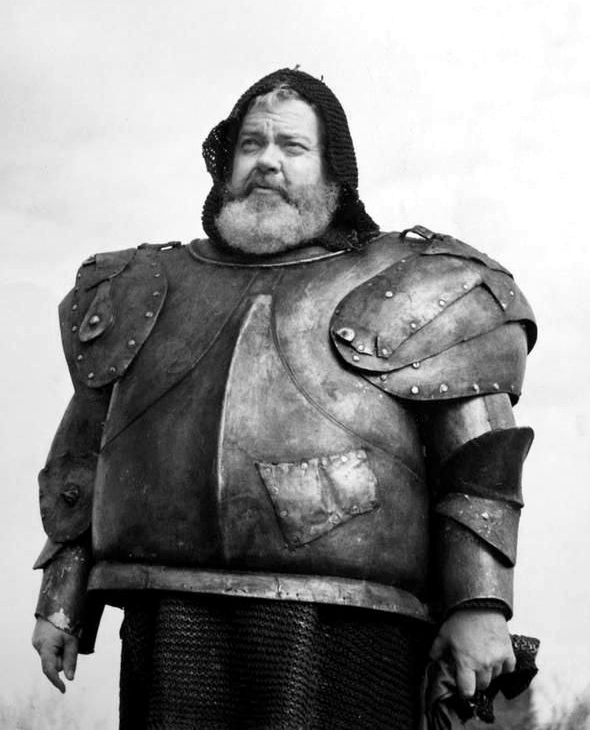
Welles as Falstaff in Chimes at Midnight (1965)

Filmed in Spain, Chimes at Midnight was based on Welles's play, Five Kings, in which he drew material from six Shakespeare plays to tell the story of Sir John Falstaff (Welles) and his relationship with Prince Hal (Keith Baxter). The cast includes John Gielgud, Jeanne Moreau, Fernando Rey and Margaret Rutherford; the film's narration, spoken by Ralph Richardson, is taken from the chronicler Raphael Holinshed. Welles held the film in high regard: "It's my favorite picture, yes. If I wanted to get into heaven on the basis of one movie, that's the one I would offer up." Anthony Lane writes that "what Welles means to conjure up is not just historical continuity—the very best of Sir John—but a sense that the Complete Works of Shakespeare constitute, as it were, one vast poem, from which his devoted and audacious interpreters are free to quote... the picture both honors Shakespeare and spurns the industry, academic and theatrical, that has encrusted him over time."

In 1966, Welles directed a film for French television, an adaptation of The Immortal Story, by Karen Blixen. Released in 1968, it stars Jeanne Moreau, Roger Coggio and Norman Eshley. The film had a successful run in French theaters. At this time Welles met Oja Kodar again, and gave her a letter he had written to her and been keeping for four years; they would not be parted again. They immediately began a collaboration both personal and professional. The first of these was an adaptation of Blixen's The Heroine, meant to be a companion piece to The Immortal Story and starring Kodar. Unfortunately, funding disappeared after one day's shooting. After completing this film, he appeared in a cameo as Cardinal Wolsey in Fred Zinnemann's adaptation of A Man for All Seasons—a role for which he won acclaim.

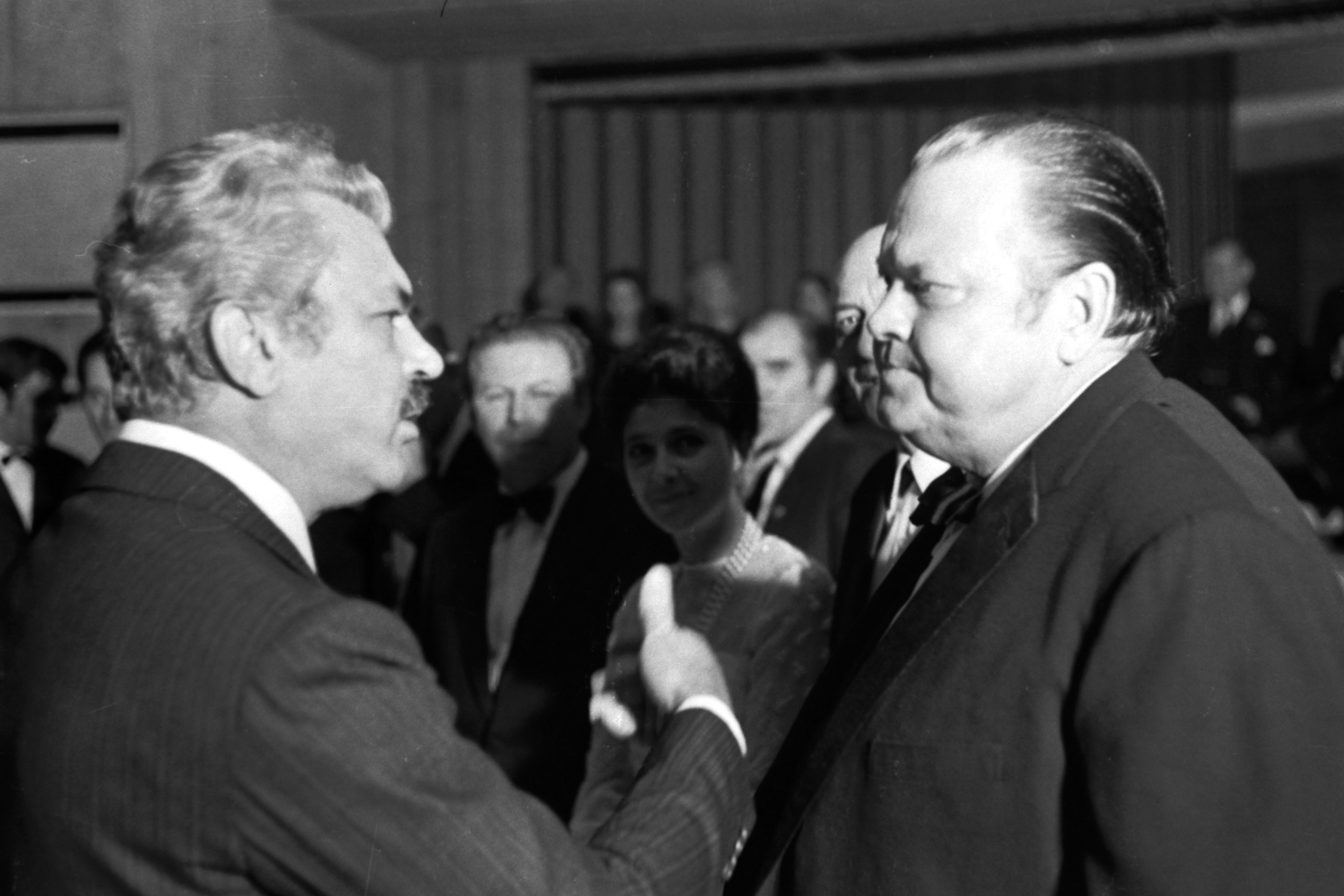
Sergei Bondarchuk and Welles at the Battle of Neretva premiere in Sarajevo (November 1969)

In 1967, Welles began directing The Deep, based on the novel Dead Calm by Charles Williams and filmed off the shore of Yugoslavia. The cast included Moreau, Kodar and Laurence Harvey. Personally financed by Welles and Kodar, they could not obtain the funds to complete the project, and it was abandoned a few years later after the death of Harvey. The surviving footage was eventually edited and released by the Filmmuseum München. In 1968 Welles began filming a TV special for CBS under the title Orson's Bag, combining travelogue, comedy skits and a condensation of Shakespeare's The Merchant of Venice with Welles as Shylock. In 1969 Welles asked editor Frederick Muller to work with him re-editing the material and they set up cutting rooms at the Safa Palatino Studios in Rome. Funding for the show sent by CBS to Welles in Switzerland was seized by the IRS. Without funding, the show was not completed. The surviving film clips portions were eventually released by the Filmmuseum München.

In 1969, Welles authorized the use of his name for a cinema in Cambridge, Massachusetts. The Orson Welles Cinema remained in operation until 1986, with Welles making a personal appearance there in 1977. Also in 1969, he played a supporting role in John Huston's The Kremlin Letter. Drawn by the offers he received to work in television and films, and upset by a tabloid scandal reporting his affair with Kodar, Welles abandoned the editing of Don Quixote and moved back to America in 1970.

=== Final return to Hollywood and later career (1970–1985) ===
Welles returned to Hollywood, where he continued to self-finance his film and television projects. While offers to act, narrate and host continued, Welles found himself in demand on talk shows. In 1967, he played Le Chiffre in the James Bond spoof Casino Royale. Due to a feud between Welles and co-star Peter Sellers, the two refused to be on set with each other, meaning their scenes had to be shot separately with body stand-ins. Welles made appearances for Dick Cavett, Johnny Carson, Dean Martin, Jackie Gleason and Merv Griffin. Welles's focus during his final years was The Other Side of the Wind, a project that was filmed intermittently between 1970 and 1976. Co-written by Welles and Oja Kodar, it is the story of an aging film director (John Huston) looking for funds to complete his final film. The cast includes Peter Bogdanovich, Susan Strasberg, Norman Foster, Edmond O'Brien, Cameron Mitchell and Dennis Hopper. Financed by Iranian backers, ownership fell into a legal quagmire after the Shah of Iran was deposed. The legal disputes kept the film in its unfinished state until 2017 and it was finally released in 2018.

Welles often invokes "The War of the Worlds" as host of Who's Out There? (1973), an award-winning NASA documentary short film by Robert Drew about the likelihood of life on other planets

Welles portrayed King Louis XVIII in the 1970 film Waterloo, and narrated the beginning and ending scenes of the historical comedy Start the Revolution Without Me (1970).

In 1971, Welles directed a short adaptation of Moby-Dick, a one-man performance on a bare stage, reminiscent of his 1955 stage production Moby Dick – Rehearsed. Never completed, it was released by the Filmmuseum München. He appeared in Ten Days' Wonder, co-starring with Anthony Perkins and directed by Claude Chabrol, based on a detective novel by Ellery Queen. That same year, the Academy of Motion Picture Arts and Sciences gave him an Academy Honorary Award "for superlative artistry and versatility in the creation of motion pictures." Welles pretended to be out of town and sent Huston to claim it, thanking the academy on film. In his speech, Huston criticized the academy for presenting the award while refusing to support Welles's projects. In 1972, Welles acted as on-screen narrator for the documentary version of Alvin Toffler's 1970 book Future Shock. Working again for a British producer, Welles played Long John Silver in director John Hough's Treasure Island (1972), an adaptation of Robert Louis Stevenson's novel, which had been the second story broadcast by The Mercury Theatre on the Air in 1938. This was the last time he played the lead role in a major film. Welles contributed to the script, although his writing credit was attributed to the pseudonym 'O. W. Jeeves'. In some versions of the film Welles's original recorded dialog was redubbed by Robert Rietty.

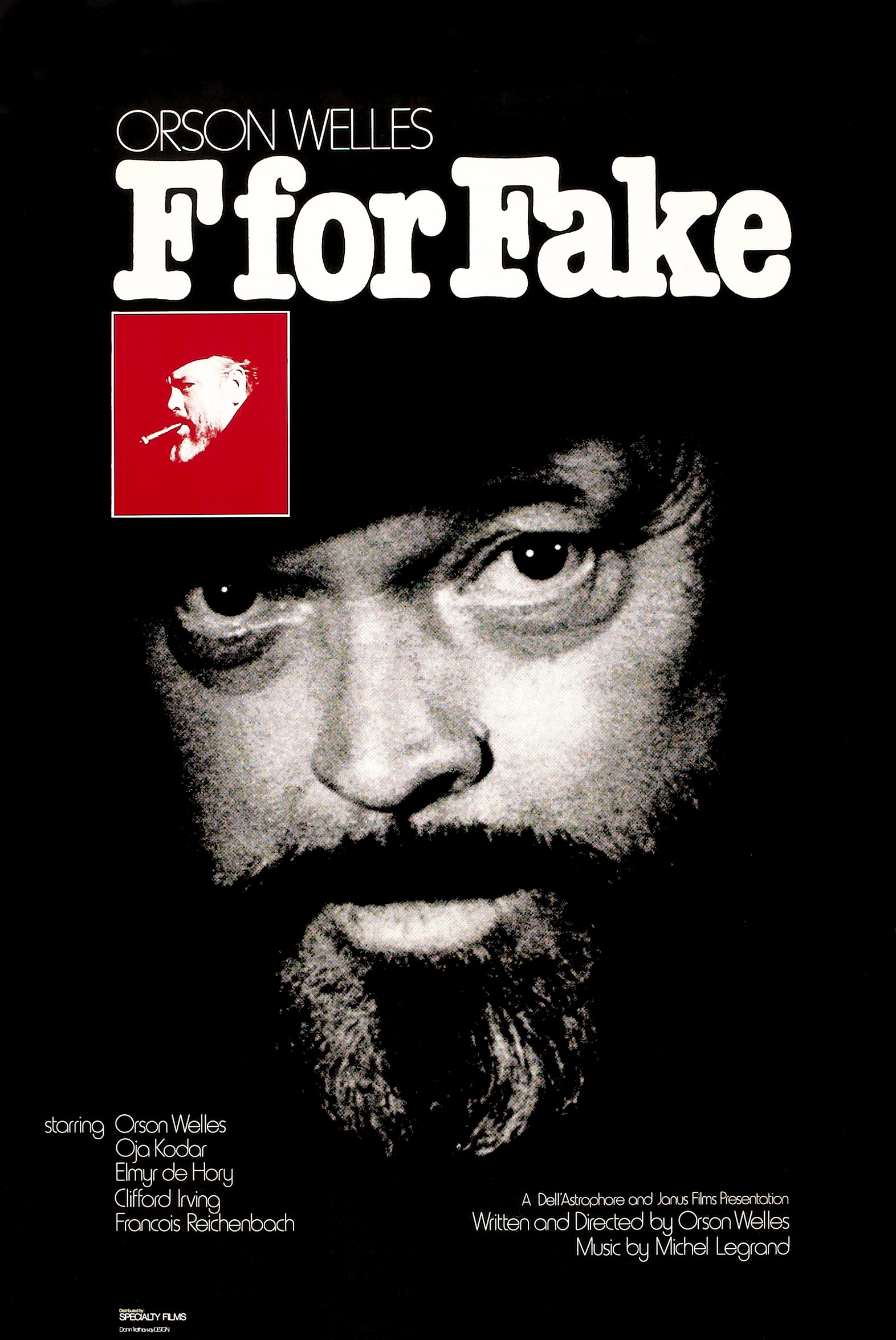
Poster for F for Fake (1974), a film essay and the last film he completed

In 1973, Welles completed F for Fake, a personal essay film about art forger Elmyr de Hory and biographer Clifford Irving. Based on an existing documentary by François Reichenbach, it included new material with Oja Kodar, Joseph Cotten, Paul Stewart and William Alland. An excerpt of Welles's 1930s War of the Worlds broadcast was recreated for this film; however, none of the dialogue heard in the film actually matches what was originally broadcast. Welles filmed a five-minute trailer, rejected in the U.S., that featured shots of a topless Kodar. Welles hosted a British syndicated anthology series, Orson Welles Great Mysteries, during the 1973–74 television season. His introductions to the 26 half-hour episodes were shot in July 1973 by Gary Graver. 1974 saw Welles lending his voice to And Then There Were None produced by his former associate, Harry Alan Towers and starring an international cast that included Oliver Reed, Elke Sommer and Herbert Lom. In 1975, Welles narrated the documentary Bugs Bunny: Superstar, focusing on Warner Bros. cartoons from the 1940s. The American Film Institute presented Welles with its third Lifetime Achievement Award. At the ceremony, Welles screened scenes from the nearly finished The Other Side of the Wind.

In 1976, Paramount Television purchased the rights for the entire corpus of Nero Wolfe stories for Welles. (Note: Pre-production materials for Nero Wolfe (1976) are contained in the Orson Welles – Oja Kodar Papers at the University of Michigan.) Welles had once wanted to make a series of Nero Wolfe movies, but author Rex Stout—who was leery of Hollywood adaptations after two disappointing 1930s films—turned him down. Paramount planned to begin with an ABC-TV movie and hoped to persuade Welles to continue the role in a miniseries. Frank D. Gilroy was signed to write the television script and direct the TV movie on the assurance that Welles would star, but by April 1977 Welles had bowed out. In 1980 the Associated Press reported "the distinct possibility" that Welles would star in a Nero Wolfe TV series for NBC television. Again, Welles left the project due to creative differences with Paramount. William Conrad was cast in the role.

In 1979, Welles completed his documentary Filming Othello, featuring Michael MacLiammoir and Hilton Edwards. Made for West German television, it was also released in theaters. Welles completed his self-produced pilot for The Orson Welles Show, featuring interviews with Burt Reynolds, Jim Henson and Frank Oz and guest-starring the Muppets and Angie Dickinson. Unable to find network interest, the pilot was never broadcast. Welles appeared in the biopic The Secret of Nikola Tesla, and made a cameo in The Muppet Movie. Beginning in the late 1970s, Welles participated in a series of famous television advertisements. For two years he was on-camera spokesman for the Paul Masson Vineyards, (Note: Paul Masson's spokesman since 1979, Welles parted company with Paul Masson in 1981, and in 1982 he was replaced by John Gielgud.) and sales grew by one third during the time Welles intoned what became a popular catchphrase: "We will sell no wine before its time." Years later, the commercials regained notoriety when a bootleg recording of out-takes was distributed, showing an apparently inebriated Welles on set. He was the voice behind the long-running Carlsberg "Probably the best lager in the world" campaign, promoted Domecq sherry on British television and provided narration on adverts for Findus, though they have been overshadowed by a blooper reel of voice recordings, known as the Frozen Peas reel. He did commercials for the Preview Subscription Television Service seen on stations around the country.

In 1981, Welles hosted the documentary The Man Who Saw Tomorrow, about Nostradamus. In 1982, the BBC broadcast The Orson Welles Story in the Arena series. Interviewed by Leslie Megahey, Welles examined his past in detail, and people from his professional past were interviewed. It was reissued in 1990 as With Orson Welles: Stories of a Life in Film. Welles provided narration for a 1982 documentary on American public television, the tracks "Defender" from Manowar's 1987 album Fighting the World and "Dark Avenger" on their 1982 album, Battle Hymns. He recorded the concert introduction for the live performances of Manowar that says, "Ladies and gentlemen, from the United States of America, all hail Manowar." Manowar have used this introduction for all their concerts since. During the 1980s, Welles worked on such film projects as The Dreamers, based on two stories by Isak Dinesen and starring Oja Kodar, and Orson Welles' Magic Show, which reused material from his failed TV pilot. Another project was Filming the Trial, the second in a proposed series of documentaries examining his feature films. While much was shot, none was completed. All were eventually released by the Filmmuseum München.

In the mid-1980s, Henry Jaglom taped lunch conversations with Welles at Los Angeles's Ma Maison, and in New York. Recordings were edited by Peter Biskind and published in the 2013 book My Lunches With Orson.

In 1984, Welles narrated the short-lived television series Scene of the Crime. During the early years of Magnum, P.I., Welles was the voice of the unseen character Robin Masters, a writer and playboy. Welles's death forced this character to be written out of the series. In an oblique homage to Welles, the Magnum, P.I. producers ambiguously concluded that story arc by having a character accuse another of having hired an actor to portray Robin Masters. He also released a music single, titled "I Know What It Is to Be Young (But You Don't Know What It Is to Be Old)", which he recorded under Italian label Compagnia Generale del Disco. The song was performed with the Nick Perito Orchestra and the Ray Charles Singers and produced by Jerry Abbott.

The last film roles before Welles's death included voice work in the animated films Enchanted Journey (1984) and The Transformers: The Movie (1986), in which he provided the voice for the planet-eating supervillain Unicron. His last film appearance was in Henry Jaglom's 1987 independent film Someone to Love, released two years after his death but produced before his voice-over in Transformers: The Movie. His last television credit was on Moonlighting. He recorded an introduction to an episode titled "The Dream Sequence Always Rings Twice", which aired five days after Welles's death and was dedicated to his memory.

== Other ventures ==
=== Activism ===
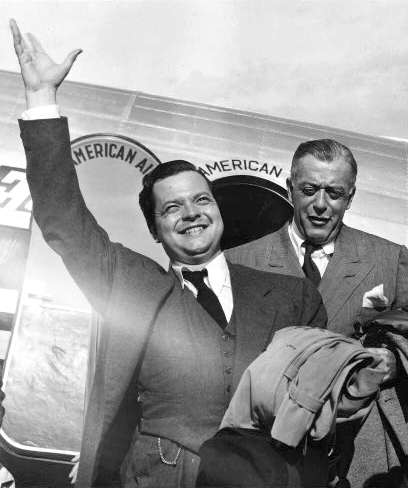
Welles, accompanied by RKO vice-president Phil Reisman, arrives in Rio de Janeiro as a goodwill ambassador to Latin America (February 1942)

In late November 1941, Welles was appointed as a goodwill ambassador to Latin America by Nelson Rockefeller, U.S. Coordinator of Inter-American Affairs and a principal stockholder in RKO Radio Pictures. The mission of the OCIAA was cultural diplomacy, promoting hemispheric solidarity and countering the growing influence of the Axis powers in Latin America. John Hay Whitney, head of the agency's Motion Picture Division, was asked by the Brazilian government to produce a documentary of the annual Rio Carnival taking place in early February 1942. In a telegram on December 20, 1941, Whitney wrote Welles, "Personally believe you would make great contribution to hemisphere solidarity with this project."

The OCIAA sponsored cultural tours to Latin America and appointed goodwill ambassadors including George Balanchine and the American Ballet, Bing Crosby, Aaron Copland, Walt Disney, John Ford and Rita Hayworth. Welles was briefed in Washington, D.C., immediately before departure for Brazil, and film scholar Catherine L. Benamou found it likely he was among the goodwill ambassadors asked to gather intelligence for the U.S. government. She concluded that Welles's acceptance of Whitney's request was "a logical and patently patriotic choice".

In addition to working on his ill-fated film It's All True, Welles was responsible for radio programs, lectures, interviews and informal talks as part of his OCIAA-sponsored cultural mission, which was regarded as a success. He spoke on topics ranging from Shakespeare to visual art at gatherings of Brazil's elite, and his intercontinental radio broadcasts in April 1942 were particularly intended to tell U.S. audiences that President Getúlio Vargas was a partner with the Allies. Welles's ambassadorial mission was extended to permit his travel to Argentina, Bolivia, Chile, Colombia, Ecuador, Guatemala, Mexico, Peru and Uruguay. Welles worked for more than six months with no compensation.

In 1946, Welles took to the airwaves in a series of radio broadcasts demanding justice for a decorated black veteran, Isaac Woodard, who had been beaten and blinded by white police officers. Welles devoted his July 28, 1946, program to reading Woodard's affidavit and vowing to bring the officer responsible to justice. He continued his crusade over subsequent Sunday afternoon broadcasts on ABC Radio. "The NAACP felt that these broadcasts did more than anything else to prompt the Justice Department to act on the case," the Museum of Broadcasting stated in its 1988 retrospective Orson Welles on the Air: The Radio Years.

=== Politics ===
Welles was politically active from the beginning of his career. He remained aligned with left-wing politics and the American Left, and always defined his political orientation as "progressive". A Democrat, he was an outspoken critic of racism in the United States and segregation. He was a strong supporter of Franklin D. Roosevelt and the New Deal and often spoke out on radio in support of progressive politics. He campaigned for Roosevelt in the 1944 election.

In a 1983 conversation with his friend Roger Hill, Welles recalled: "During a White House dinner, when I was campaigning for Roosevelt, in a toast, with considerable tongue in cheek, he said, 'Orson, you and I are the two greatest actors alive today.' In private that evening, and on several other occasions, he urged me to run for a Senate seat in either California or Wisconsin. He wasn't alone." In the 1980s, Welles expressed admiration for Roosevelt but described his presidency as "a semidictatorship".

During a 1970 appearance on The Dick Cavett Show, Welles claimed to have met Hitler while hiking in Austria with a teacher who was a "budding Nazi". He said that Hitler made no impression on him and that he could not remember anything of him from the encounter. He said that he had no personality at all: "He was invisible. There was nothing there until there were 5,000 people yelling sieg heil."

For several years, he wrote a newspaper column on political issues and considered running for the U.S. Senate in 1946, representing his home state of Wisconsin—a seat ultimately won by Joseph McCarthy.

Welles's political activities were reported on pages 155–157 of Red Channels, the anti-Communist publication that, in part, fueled the already flourishing Hollywood Blacklist. He was in Europe during the height of the Red Scare, thereby adding another reason for the Hollywood establishment to ostracize him.

In 1970, Welles narrated (but did not write) a satirical political record on the rise of President Richard Nixon titled The Begatting of the President. In the late 1970s, Welles referred to Josip Broz Tito as "the greatest man in the world today" on Yugoslav television.

Welles spoke before a crowd of 700,000 at a nuclear disarmament rally in Central Park on June 12, 1982, and attacked the policies of Ronald Reagan and the Republican Party.

American: An Odyssey to 1947, a documentary by Danny Wu that looks at Welles's life against the political landscape of the 1930s and 40s, had its premiere at the Newport Beach Film Festival in 2022.

== Personal life ==
=== Relationships and family ===
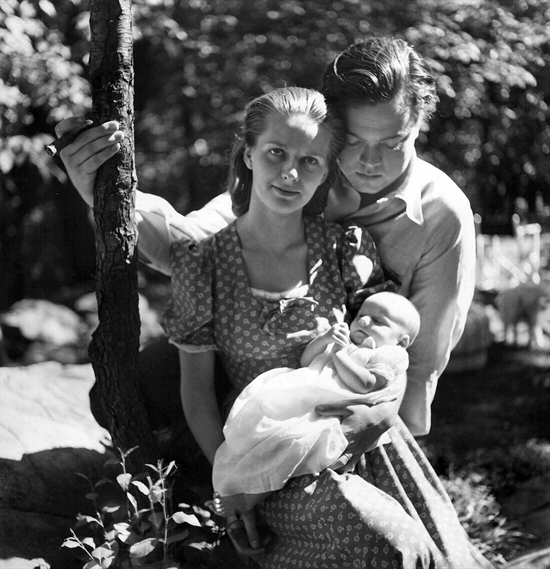
Welles and Virginia Nicolson Welles with their daughter Christopher Marlowe Welles (1938)

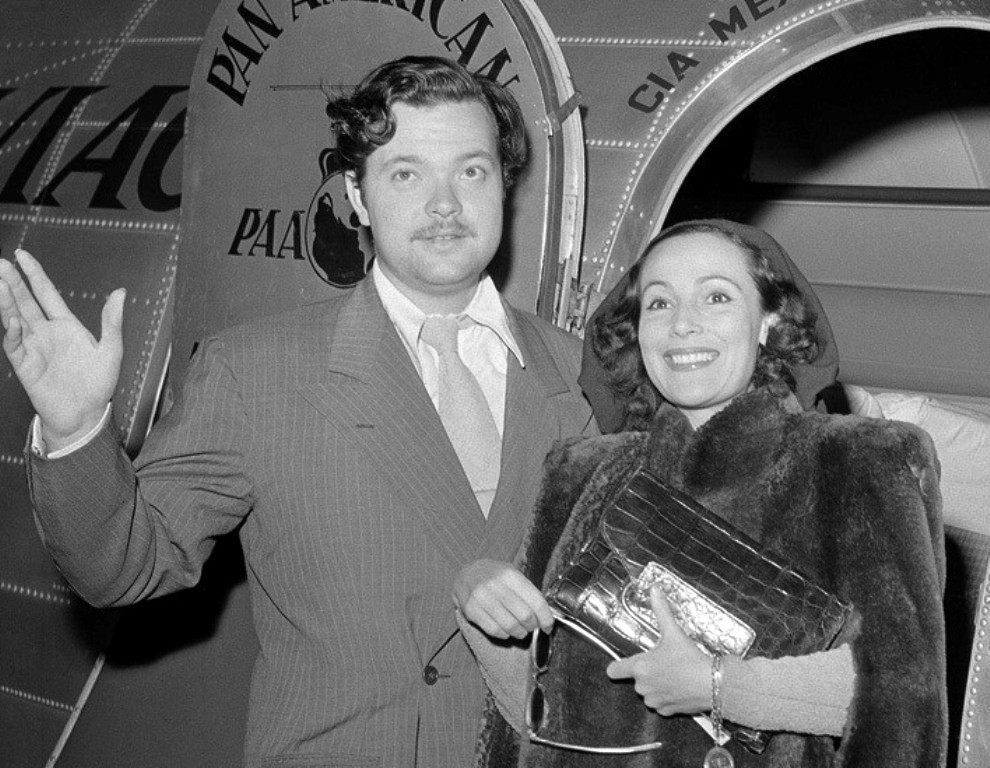
Welles and Dolores del Río (1941)

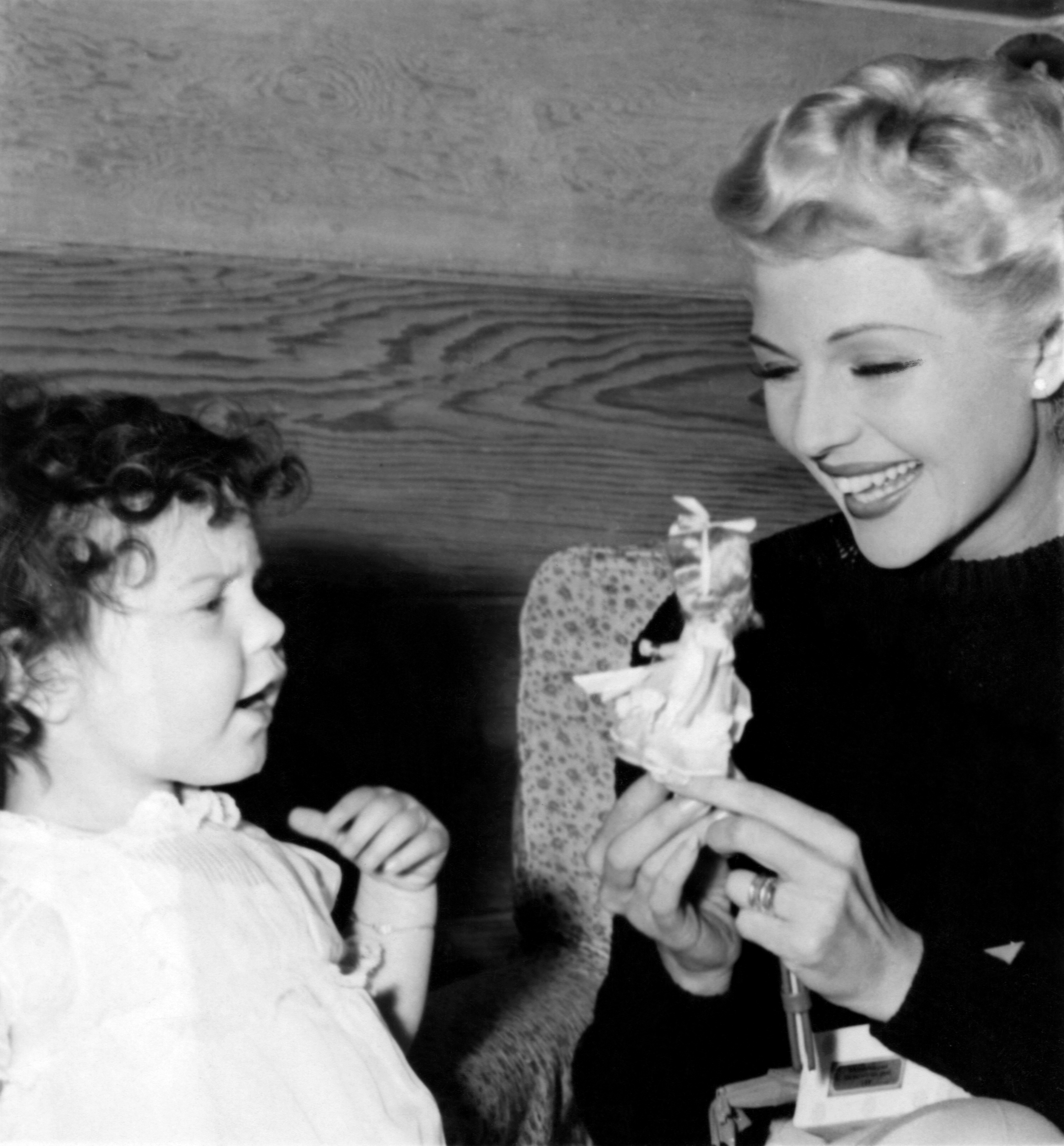
Daughter Rebecca Welles and Rita Hayworth (December 1946)

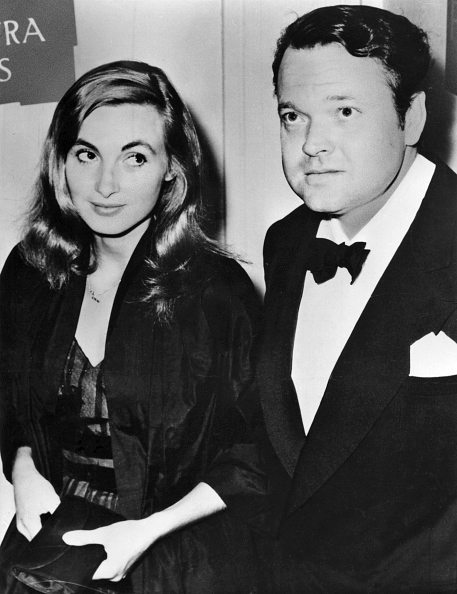
Paola Mori and Welles, days before their marriage (May 1955)

Welles and Chicago-born actress and socialite Virginia Nicolson were married on November 14, 1934. "Regardless of his later comments, the two were very much in love," wrote biographer Patrick McGilligan, "and she was his salvation." (Note: Virginia Welles is a sympathetically written key character in one of Welles's last important pieces of writing, the unproduced screenplay about the 1937 staging of The Cradle Will Rock that he completed a year before his death.) The couple separated in December 1939 and divorced in February 1940. A few months later, on May 18, 1940, Virginia married Marion Davies's nephew Charles Lederer.

After bearing with Welles's romances in New York, Virginia had learned that Welles had fallen in love with Mexican actress Dolores del Río. Infatuated with her since adolescence, Welles met del Río at Darryl Zanuck's ranch soon after he moved to Hollywood in 1939. Their relationship was kept secret until 1941, when del Río filed for divorce from her second husband. They openly appeared together in New York while Welles was directing the Mercury stage production Native Son. They acted together in the movie Journey into Fear (1943). Their relationship came to an end due, among other things, to Welles's infidelities. Del Río returned to Mexico in 1943, shortly before Welles married Rita Hayworth. Welles married Hayworth on September 7, 1943. They were divorced on November 10, 1947. During his last interview, recorded for The Merv Griffin Show on the evening before his death, Welles called Hayworth "one of the dearest and sweetest women that ever lived ... and we were a long time together—I was lucky enough to have been with her longer than any of the other men in her life."

In 1955, Welles married actress Paola Mori, an Italian aristocrat who starred as Raina Arkadin in his film Mr. Arkadin. The couple began an affair, and were married at her parents' insistence. They were wed in London on May 8, 1955, and never divorced.

Croatian-born artist and actress Oja Kodar became Welles's longtime companion and mistress both personally and professionally from 1966 onward. They lived together for some of the last 20 years of his life.

Welles had three daughters from his marriages: Christopher Welles Feder (born 1938, with Virginia Nicolson); (Note: "On March 27, 1938," biographer Barbara Leaming wrote, "Orson's close friends received a most peculiar telegram: 'Christopher, she is born.' It was no joke" Her full name was given to be Christopher Marlowe in a January 1940 magazine profile of Welles by Lucille Fletcher.) Rebecca Welles Manning (1944–2004, with Rita Hayworth); and Beatrice Welles (born 1955, with Paola Mori).

Welles has been thought to have had a son, British director Michael Lindsay-Hogg (born 1940), with Irish actress Geraldine Fitzgerald, then the wife of Sir Edward Lindsay-Hogg, 4th baronet. When Lindsay-Hogg was 16, his mother reluctantly divulged pervasive rumors that his father was Welles, and she denied them—but in such detail that he doubted her veracity. Fitzgerald evaded the subject for the rest of her life. Lindsay-Hogg knew Welles, worked with him in the theatre and met him at intervals throughout Welles's life. After learning that Welles's oldest daughter, Chris, his childhood playmate, had long suspected that he was her brother, Lindsay-Hogg initiated a DNA test that proved inconclusive. In his 2011 autobiography, Lindsay-Hogg reported that his questions were resolved by his mother's close friend Gloria Vanderbilt, who wrote that Fitzgerald had told her that Welles was his father. A 2015 Welles biography by Patrick McGilligan, however, reports the impossibility of Welles's paternity: Fitzgerald left the U.S. for Ireland in May 1939, and her son was conceived before her return in late October, whereas Welles did not travel overseas during that period.

After the death of Rebecca Welles Manning, a man named Marc McKerrow was revealed to be her son—and therefore a direct descendant of Welles and Hayworth—after he requested his adoption records unsealed. While McKerrow and Rebecca were never able to meet due to her cancer, they were in touch before her death, and he attended her funeral. McKerrow's reactions to the revelation and his meeting with Kodar are documented in the 2008 Prodigal Sons, produced and directed by his sister Kimberly Reed. In 2010, McKerrow, 44, died in his sleep. His death was related to injuries he received in a car accident when younger.

In the 1940s, Welles had a brief relationship with Maila Nurmi. According to the biography Glamour Ghoul: The Passions and Pain of the Real Vampira, Maila Nurmi, she became pregnant; since Welles was then married to Hayworth, Nurmi gave the child up for adoption. However, the child mentioned in the book was born in 1944. Nurmi revealed in an interview weeks before her death in 2008 that she met Welles in a New York casting office in spring 1946.

Despite an urban legend promoted by Welles, (Note: While bantering with Lucille Ball on a 1944 broadcast of The Orson Welles Almanac before an audience of U.S. Navy service members, Welles says: "My great-granduncle was Gideon Welles, Secretary of the Navy in Lincoln's cabinet." (Lucille Ball AFRS broadcast, May 3, 1944, 2:42.)) (Note: Welles repeats the claim in a 1970 appearance on the Dick Cavett Show.) he is not related to Abraham Lincoln's wartime Secretary of the Navy, Gideon Welles. The myth dates back to the first newspaper feature ever written about Welles—"Cartoonist, Actor, Poet and only 10"—in the February 19, 1926, issue of The Capital Times. The article falsely states he was descended from "Gideon Welles, who was a member of President Lincoln's cabinet". As presented by Charles Higham in a genealogical chart that introduces his 1985 biography of Welles, Welles's father was Richard Head Welles (born Wells), son of Richard Jones Wells, son of Henry Hill Wells (who had an uncle named Gideon Wells), son of William Hill Wells, son of Richard Wells (1734–1801).

=== Physical characteristics ===
Peter Noble's 1956 biography describes Welles as "a magnificent figure of a man, over six feet tall, handsome, with flashing eyes and a gloriously resonant speaking-voice". Welles said that a voice specialist once told him he was born to be a heldentenor, a heroic tenor, but that when he was young and working at the Gate Theatre in Dublin, he forced his voice down into a bass-baritone.

Even as a baby, Welles was prone to illness, including diphtheria, measles, whooping cough, and malaria. From infancy he suffered from asthma, sinus headaches, and backache later found to result from congenital spinal anomalies. Flat feet caused him foot and ankle trouble throughout his life. "As he grew older", Brady wrote, "his ill health was exacerbated by the late hours he was allowed to keep [and] an early penchant for alcohol and tobacco".

In 1928, aged 13, Welles was already six feet tall (1.83 m) and weighed over 180 pounds (82 kg). His passport recorded his height as six feet three inches (1.91 m), with brown hair and green eyes. "Crash diets, [pharmaceutical] drugs, and corsets had slimmed him for his early film roles", wrote biographer Barton Whaley. "Then always back to gargantuan consumption of high-caloric food and booze. By summer 1949, when he was 34, his weight had crept up to a stout 230 pounds (100 kg). In 1953, he ballooned from 250 to 275 pounds (113 to 125 kilograms). After 1960, he remained permanently obese."

=== Religious beliefs ===
When Peter Bogdanovich once asked him about his religion, Welles gruffly replied that it was none of his business, then misinformed him that he was raised Catholic. Although the Welles family was no longer devout, it was fourth-generation Episcopalian and before that, Quaker and Puritan. In 1982, when interviewer Merv Griffin asked about his religious beliefs, Welles replied, "I try to be a Christian. I don't pray really, because I don't want to bore God."

Near the end of his life, Welles was dining at Ma Maison, his favorite restaurant in Los Angeles, when proprietor Patrick Terrail conveyed an invitation from the head of the Greek Orthodox Church, who asked Welles to be his guest of honor at divine liturgy at Saint Sophia Cathedral. Welles replied, "Please tell him I really appreciate that offer, but I am an atheist."

"Orson never joked or teased about the religious beliefs of others", wrote biographer Barton Whaley. "He accepted it as a cultural artifact, suitable for the births, deaths, and marriages of strangers and even some friends—but without emotional or intellectual meaning for himself."

== Death and tributes ==
Welles recorded his final interview on The Merv Griffin Show during the evening of October 9, 1985, telling biographer Barbara Leaming about his life. Biographer Frank Brady called the segment "a nostalgic interlude". Welles returned to his house in Hollywood and worked into the early hours typing stage directions for Orson Welles' Magic Show, which he and Gary Graver were planning to shoot at UCLA the following day. On the morning of October 10, he suffered a heart attack and died at the age of 70. He was found by his chauffeur at around 10 a.m.

Welles was cremated by prior agreement with the executor of his estate, Greg Garrison, whose advice about making lucrative TV appearances in the 1970s made it possible for Welles to pay off a portion of the taxes he owed the IRS. A private funeral was attended by his widow Paola Mori and his three daughters, marking the first time they had all been together. Outside of family, only close friends were invited: Garrison, Graver, Roger Hill, and Prince Alessandro Tasca di Cuto.

A public memorial tribute took place at the Directors Guild of America Theater in Los Angeles on November 2, 1985. Host Peter Bogdanovich introduced speakers including Charles Champlin, Geraldine Fitzgerald, Greg Garrison, Charlton Heston, Roger Hill, Henry Jaglom, Arthur Knight, Oja Kodar, Barbara Leaming, Janet Leigh, Norman Lloyd, Dan O'Herlihy, Patrick Terrail, and Robert Wise.

Joseph Cotten later wrote that Welles "did not want a funeral; he wanted to be buried quietly in a little place in Spain". Cotten declined to attend the memorial program, instead sending a short message that ended with the last two lines of Shakespeare's Sonnet 30, which Welles had sent him on his most recent birthday: "But if the while I think on thee, dear friend / All losses are restored and sorrows end."

In 1987, Welles's ashes were taken to Spain, where they were buried in an old well on the Ronda estate of his longtime friend Antonio Ordóñez. (Note: A photograph of the grave site appears opposite the title page of Orson Welles on Shakespeare: The W.P.A. and Mercury Theatre Playscripts, edited by Richard France. France notes the inscription on the plaque: "Ronda. Al Maestro de Maestros.") (Note: The gravesite is not accessible to the public but can be seen in Kristian Petri's 2005 documentary, Brunnen (The Well), which is about Welles's time in Spain.)

== Legacy ==
=== Influence ===
Writing for The Guardian, actor and biographer Simon Callow stated of Welles:

His successes and his failures were equally titanic; he created some of the most memorable films and striking theatre of the 20th century. His tiny body of TV work pointed to possibilities for the medium that nobody bothered to take up. He was fearless in his experiments, and he never did any of it for the money, just for the sheer joy of making films. Because of this, he has inspired more directors than any other film-maker, but he leaves no legacy: he really was a one-off.

The New York Times eulogized Welles as an "innovator of film and stage" and noted that "few denied his genius" by the end of his life, stating that "in film, his innovations in deep-focus technology and his use of theater esthetics—long takes without close-ups, making the viewer's eye search the screen as if it were a stage—created a new vocabulary for the cinema". According to the American Film Institute, "perhaps one of [Welles's] most significant contributions to film was his pioneering effort as what we now call an independent filmmaker. In the Forties, when almost all production was still studio-based, Welles began making films entirely on location as a maverick independent, putting them together with spit, string, and chutzpah, blazing the trail for many filmmakers to follow." Micheál Mac Liammóir wrote that "Orson's courage, like everything else about him, imagination, egotism, generosity, ruthlessness, forbearance, impatience, sensitivity, grossness and vision is magnificently out of proportion." Critic David Thomson credits Welles with "the creation of a visual style that is simultaneously baroque and precise, overwhelmingly emotional, and unerringly founded in reality." Peter Bogdanovich, who was directed by Welles in The Other Side of the Wind, wrote:

Being directed by Welles was like breathing pure oxygen all day long. He was so totally in control that he never had to prove a point out of any kind. I never saw him get angry or impatient, or raise his voice in any way but hilarity... Sometimes Orson was holding the camera himself, but wherever the camera was, he had put it there, and all the lights were placed exactly where he said they were to be put. There wasn't anything seen or heard in any scene that wasn't there because Orson wanted it that way, but he was never dictatorial.

Welles was a lifelong lover of Shakespeare, and Bogdanovich writes that Chimes at Midnight, in which Welles plays John Falstaff, is "arguably his best film, and his own personal favorite"; Joseph McBride and Jonathan Rosenbaum have called it Welles's masterpiece, and Vincent Canby wrote "it may be the greatest Shakespearean film ever made."

After Welles went to South America to film the documentary It's All True, RKO cut more than forty minutes from Ambersons and added a happier ending, against his wishes. The missing footage has been called a "holy grail" of cinema. Welles wrote a 58-page memo to Universal about the editing of Touch of Evil, which they disregarded. In 1998, Walter Murch reedited the film according to Welles's specifications.

Known for his baritone voice, Welles performed extensively across theatre, radio, and film. He was a lifelong magician, presenting troop variety shows in the war years.

=== In popular culture ===
- Director Peter Jackson cast Montreal actor Jean Guérin as Welles in his 1994 film, Heavenly Creatures.
- Vincent D'Onofrio portrayed Welles in a cameo in Tim Burton's 1994 film, Ed Wood, where he encourages the eponymous filmmaker to fight for making his movies his own way in spite of his producers.
- Voice actor Maurice LaMarche is known for his Welles impression, heard in Ed Wood (in which he dubbed the dialog of Vincent D'Onofrio); the 1994–95 primetime animated series, The Critic; the 1997 Halloween episode of Hey Arnold!; a 2006 episode of The Simpsons; and a 2011 episode of Futurama for which LaMarche won an Emmy Award. The voice he created for the character Brain from the animated series Animaniacs and Pinky and the Brain was largely influenced by Welles.
- The 1996 film The Battle Over Citizen Kane, which chronicles the conflict between Welles and Hearst, was nominated for an Academy Award for Best Documentary Feature.
- Welles is a recurring character in the Anno Dracula series by author and critic Kim Newman, appearing in Dracula Cha Cha Cha (1998) and Johnny Alucard (2013).
- In 1999, Welles appeared on a U.S. postage stamp in a scene from Citizen Kane. The United States Postal Service was petitioned to honor Welles with a stamp in 2015, the 100th anniversary of his birth, but the effort did not succeed.
- The 1999 HBO docudrama, RKO 281, tells the story of the making of Citizen Kane, starring Liev Schreiber as Welles.
- Tim Robbins's 1999 film Cradle Will Rock chronicles the process and events surrounding Welles and John Houseman's production of the 1937 musical by Marc Blitzstein. Welles is played by actor Angus MacFadyen.
- Austin Pendleton's 2000 play, Orson's Shadow, concerns the 1960 London production of Eugène Ionesco's play Rhinoceros directed by Welles and starring Laurence Olivier. First presented by the Steppenwolf Theatre Company in 2000, the play opened off-Broadway in 2005 and had its European premiere in London in 2015.
- In Michael Chabon's 2000 Pulitzer Prize-winning novel The Amazing Adventures of Kavalier & Clay, the protagonists meet Welles and attend the premiere of Citizen Kane.
- In the film Fade to Black (2006), a fictional thriller set during Welles's 1948 journey to Rome to star in the movie Black Magic, Danny Huston stars as Welles.
- Me and Orson Welles (2009), based on Robert Kaplow's 2003 novel, stars Zac Efron as a teenager who convinces Welles (Christian McKay) to cast him in his 1937 production of Julius Caesar. McKay received accolades for his performance, including a BAFTA nomination.
- Welles is the central character in "Ian, George, and George," a novelette by Paul Levinson published in 2013 in Analog Science Fiction and Fact magazine.
- In 2014, comedic actor Jack Black portrayed Welles in the comedy show Drunk History.
- A 2014 documentary by Chuck Workman, Magician: The Astonishing Life and Work of Orson Welles, was released to critical acclaim.

== Accolades ==
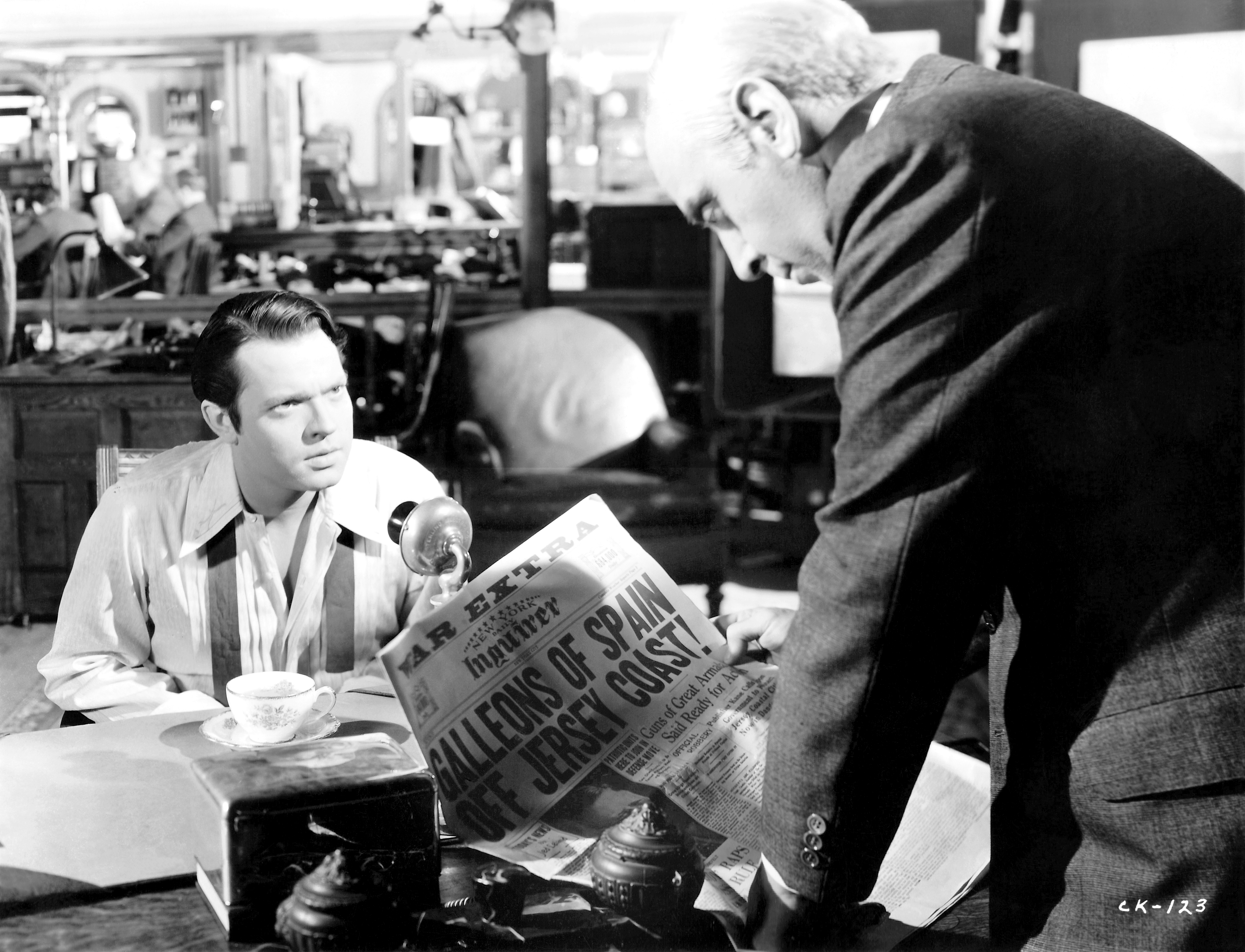
The National Board of Review recognized both Welles and George Coulouris for their performances in Citizen Kane (1941), which was also voted the year's best film.

Welles received numerous accolades including an Academy Award, Peabody Award and Grammy Award as well as nominations for a BAFTA Award and Golden Globe Award. In 1972 he was in the first set of members elected to the American Theater Hall of Fame. (Note: The others in the inaugural group of members in the Theater Hall of Fame were Walter Huston, Rudolf Friml, Lee and J. J. Shubert, Norman Bel Geddes, Jeanne Eagels, Ferenc Molnár, P. G. Wodehouse, Clyde Fitch, Lillian Russell, Arthur Hopkins, Marie Dressler, George S. Kaufman, Brooks Atkinson, George Abbott, Thornton Wilder, Ethel Merman, Bert Lahr, Moss Hart, Robert E. Sherwood, Maxwell Anderson and Clifford Odets.) His other honors include the AFI Life Achievement Award in 1975, the British Film Institute Fellowship in 1983, and the Directors Guild of America Lifetime Achievement Award in 1984. He was inducted into both the National Association of Broadcasters Hall of Fame in 1979, and the National Radio Hall of Fame in 1988. He was presented with France's Legion of Honour in 1982.

== See also ==
- List of actors who have appeared in multiple Palme d'Or winners
- List of atheists in film, radio, television and theater
- List of oldest and youngest Academy Award winners and nominees
- List of actors with Academy Award nominations

== Documentaries ==
- Baratier, Jacques, Désordre, 1950.
- Maysles, Albert and David, Orson Welles in Spain, 1966.
- Reichenbach, François, and Rossif, Frédéric, Orson Welles, 1968 (ORTF, French TV).
- Rozier, Jacques, Vive le cinéma !, 1972 (ORTF, French TV).
- Marienstras, Richard, and Romero, Isidro, Shakespeare et Orson Welles, 1973 (French TV).
- Philippe, Claude-Jean, and Lefebvre, Monique, Une légende, une vie : Citizen Welles, 1974 (French TV).
- Orson Welles talks with Roger Hill and Hortense Hill, Sedona, Arizona, 1978.
- Megahey, Leslie, and Yentob, Alan, The Orson Welles Story, 1982 (⋅Arena, BBC-TV).
- Boutang, Pierre-André, and Seligmann, Guy, Orson Welles à la cinémathèque française, 1983.
- Graver, Gary, Working with Orson Welles, 1993.
- Giorgini, Ciro, and Giagni, Gianfranco, Rosabella: La Storia italiana di Orson Welles, 1993.
- Silovic, Vassili, with Kodar Oja, Orson Welles: The One-Man Band, 1995.
- Rodriguez, Carlos, Orson Welles en el país de Don Quijote, 2000.
- Petri, Kristian, Brunnen, 2005.
- France, Richard, and Fischer, Robert, Citizen America: Orson Welles and the ballad of Isaac Woodard, 2005.
- Rafaelic, Daniel, and Rizmaul, Leon, Druga strana Wellesa, 2005.
- Sedlar, Dominik and Sedlar, Jakov, Searching for Orson, 2006.
- Bernard, Jean-Jacques, Welles Angels, 2007.
- Workman, Chuck, Magician: The Astonishing Life and Work of Orson Welles, 2014.
- Kuperberg, Julia, and Kuperberg, Clara, This is Orson Welles, 2015.
- Kapnist, Elisabeth, Orson Welles: Shadows & Light, 2015.
- Cousins, Mark, The Eyes of Orson Welles, 2018.
- Wu, Danny, American: An Odyssey to 1947, 2022.

=== Archival sources ===
- Guide to the Orson Welles Materials, Lilly Library, Indiana University
- Finding Aid for the Orson Welles – Oja Kodar Papers 1910–1998 (bulk 1965–1985), Special Collections Library, University of Michigan
- Finding Aid for the Richard Wilson – Orson Welles Papers 1930–2000 (bulk 1930–1991), Special Collections Library, University of Michigan
- Finding Aid for the Orson Welles – Chris Welles Feder Collection 1931–2009, Special Collections Library, University of Michigan
- Finding Aid for the Orson Welles – Alessandro Tasca di Cutò Papers 1947–1995, Special Collections Library, University of Michigan
- Finding Aid for the Orson Welles Dead Reckoning/The Deep Papers (1966–1975, bulk 1967–1971), Special Collections Library, University of Michigan
