= Patricia Driscoll =

British-Irish actress (1927–2020)

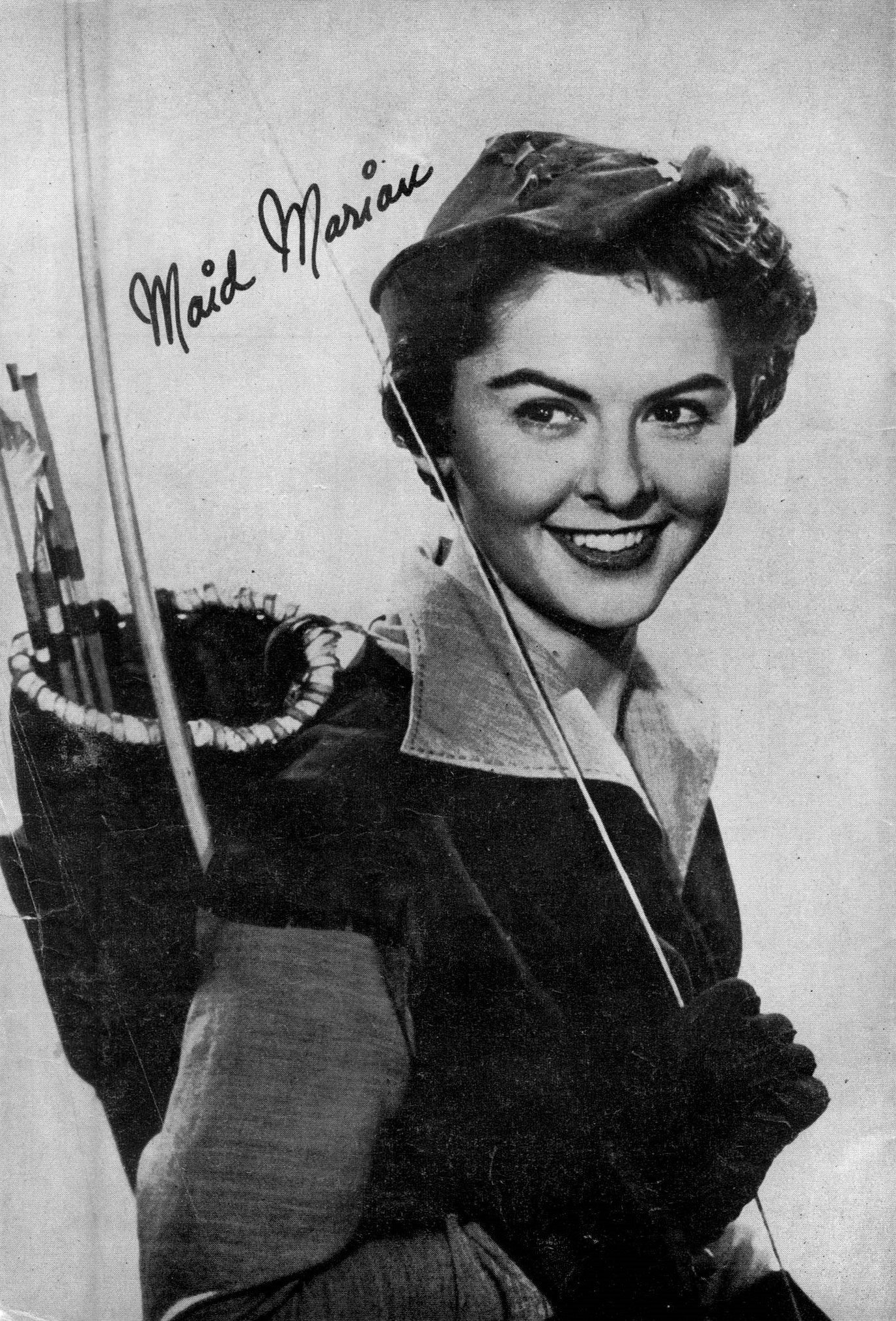
- Driscoll in costume as Maid Marian
- Born: 17 December 1927; South Kensington, London, England
- Died: 2 January 2020 (aged 92); Kent, England
- Occupation: Actress
- Years active: 1953–2000
- Spouse: Duncan Lamont (m. 1950; died 1978)
- Children: 2

Patricia Noel Driscoll (17 December 1927 – 2 January 2020) was a British and Irish actress who appeared both on television and in films.

== Television work ==
Trained as an actress at RADA, Driscoll made her first television appearances in 1953 on Whirligig and then as a police sergeant in the series Scotland Yard in the episode "The Silent Witness" in 1954. From 1955 to 1957, she introduced Picture Book, a BBC Television series that appeared on Mondays as part of the Watch with Mother cycle and encouraged children to make things. She had a catchphrase: "Do you think you could do this? – I am sure you could if you tried". Driscoll left Picture Book in 1957 to take over from Bernadette O'Farrell the part of Maid Marian opposite Richard Greene in the ITV series The Adventures of Robin Hood for 37 episodes in series 3 and 4. Her place in Picture Book was taken by Vera McKechnie in a further series in 1962–63.

Driscoll’s other numerous television appearances included: The Vise (1958), Hawaiian Eye (1959), Westinghouse Desilu Playhouse: Murder in Gratitude (1959), Danger Man (1961 and 1964), Second Time Around (six episodes, 1974), The Good Life (1977), Kidnapped (1978), and Into the Labyrinth (1981).

== Filmography ==
Year	Film	Role	Director	Other players
1955	Timeslip (U.S. title The Atomic Man)	X-ray assistant	Ken Hughes	Gene Nelson
1956	Charley Moon	Rose	Guy Hamilton	Max Bygraves
1958	Dial 999 episode "Fashions in Crime"	Det. Sgt. Ann Hawkins	Terence Fisher	Zena Marshall
1959	A Woman's Temptation	Betty	Godfrey Grayson	Robert Ayres
1959	The Child and the Killer	Peggy	Max Varnel	Robert Arden
1960	The Wackiest Ship in the Army	Maggie	Richard Murphy	Jack Lemmon

== Personal life and death ==
Driscoll was married to British actor Duncan Lamont until his death from a heart attack at the age of 60 in 1978. He, too, had appeared in The Adventures of Robin Hood. They had two children together.

She died in Kent on 2 January 2020 at the age of 92.
