= Free World (magazine) =

1940s American monthly magazine

- Editor: Louis Dolivet (Ludovic Brecher)
- Categories: News magazine
- Frequency: Monthly
- Publisher: The Free World Association
- First issue: October 1941
- Final issue: December 1946
- Company: Free World, Inc.
- Based in: New York City
- Language: English

Free World (1941–1946) was the monthly magazine of the International Free World Association, published by Free World, Inc. in New York City. It was edited by "Louis Dolivet," an émigré writer, film producer, and alleged Soviet spy born in Romania as Ludovici Udeanu with French citizenship under the alias Ludovic Brecher. Free World was militantly anti-Fascist, articulating the perspective of left-liberal Popular Front intellectuals and international political figures who supported the Allies in World War II and championed the creation of the United Nations as a successor to the failed post-World War I League of Nations.

Alongside academics and journalists from the United States, Britain, Canada, and Mexico, Free World prominently featured the voices of anti-Axis Chinese nationalists as well as exiled leaders from Spain, Italy, France, elsewhere in Europe, Brazil, Chile, and elsewhere in Latin America. An anonymous "Underground Reporter" gave regular updates on the activities of the Free French and other elements of the European resistance. The magazine's editorial position was fundamentally supportive of Soviet foreign policy, usually although not always in a subtle manner. In this respect Free World was related to publications like The Week (1933–1941), a newsletter used by British journalist and Comintern agent Claud Cockburn to wage a disinformation campaign against Nancy Astor's notorious pro-Nazi 'Cliveden set.'

Similar to other left-liberal journals of its era, Free World combined international political analysis, book reviews and artwork, along with occasional fiction and poetry. Freda Kirchwey and others at The Nation had links to Free World, as did Michael Straight and former VP Henry Wallace of The New Republic. It featured contributions from some on the anti-Stalinist left who later became associated with cold war liberalism, and it bore a resemblance to influential journals associated with the New York intellectuals, including The New Leader, Partisan Review, Common Sense, and Commentary (which began in 1945, followed by The Reporter (1949), Encounter (1953), and Dissent (1954)).

Starting with its first issue, Free World was billed as "A Monthly Magazine Devoted to Democracy and World Affairs." The month prior to the opening of the United Nations Conference on International Organization, in April 1945, the Free World tagline was changed to "A Non-Partisan Magazine Devoted to the United Nations and Democracy." In October 1945, as the UN Charter went into effect, it became simply "A Monthly Magazine for the United Nations." Despite this title, and the extensive involvement of many editors and writers in the establishment of the new international organization, Free World was never formally connected with the United Nations.

Attracting ministers and diplomats from across the nearly fifty original UN Member States, by the start of 1946, Free World published in eight different editions in four languages: American, Mexican, French, Chilean, Chinese, Greek, Puerto Rican, and Uruguayan; Russian, Swedish, Czechoslovak, Italian, Arabic, and British editions were "in preparation" throughout the last year of publication. Following the final issue of Free World in December 1946, Dolivet launched a new magazine called United Nations World, its first issue appearing in February 1947 (if not earlier). He abandoned that venture in 1950, having returned to France in 1949 and subsequently being banned from reentering the United States upon suspicion of having ties to Communism. United Nations World lasted under different editorship until 1953.

== International and editorial boards ==
Most issues of Free World included the list of an International Board, an Honorary Board, and a much smaller Editorial Board. About one hundred people total, this body stayed remarkably consistent, although its organization was improved throughout the years. Starting in 1944 the International and Honorary boards were merged into a single entity, while the Editorial Board was accompanied by a group of Editorial Writers and a new American Editor. Previously shown just as the General-Secretary of the Free World Association, Louis Dolivet was subsequently listed as the magazine's International Editor.

== Inaugural issue ==
After a vivid drawing depicting Hitler as a demon in the throes of defeat, the opening pages of the first issue of Free World featured a brief note from Secretary of State Cordell Hull, which proclaimed that "There will be a better day" while affirming an"absolute faith in the ultimate triumph of the principles of humanity, translated into law and order, by which freedom and justice and security will again prevail." This was followed by a poem from Archibald MacLeish, "The Western Sky: Words for a Song," which in part read: "Be Proud America to bear/ The endless labor of the free/ To strike for freedom everywhere/ And everywhere bear liberty." The next pages contained an "Editorial" announcing the aims and describing the methods of the International Free World Association and Free World, "which does not represent merely the launching of another magazine...its appearance is a political act. It springs out of the conviction of the democratic forces gathered around FREE WORLD that the time is ripe for common action to win the war and to win the peace." To this end:

Through its pages will speak the enlightened Latin Americans who understand that the fight on the other side of the Atlantic is also their fight; the people of Europe who know in their own flesh the merciless cruelty of Nazi domination; the forces that in China oppose to [sic] Japanese aggression not only their patriotic will for independence but also their faith in democracy; the leaders of democratic opinion in the United States, engaged in the double task of opposing the aggressors and contributing to the organization of a better world order.

Thus while "stemming from many different origins, our movement toward a free world is in a certain sense symbolic of the democratic order to come. Through its work will be created at least a part of the cadre of the society of tomorrow—a society that will establish a free peace based on worldwide political and economic democracy, working through an international system of collective security." In a piece titled "Political War," Dolivet further explicated the intended role of his new organization, while reminding readers that "the greatest ideological weapons against tyranny have been forged" by "private groups and associations."

== Free World Association ==
The International Free World Association was formed during a June 15, 1941, conference in Washington, D.C., attended by exiled "citizens of sixteen nations, many of them former government officials of high rank," as reported by The New York Times. The group established an international headquarters in Manhattan while "forming chapters throughout the United States, Latin America, and certain nations of Europe and Asia," as described in the Pittsburgh Post-Gazette. In addition to lobbying for a democratic world federation after the war, the association sought to spread awareness of the anti-Fascist underground in Europe, while at the same time transmitting information to members of the resistance. Alongside the magazine, which started with English, Spanish, and Chinese editions, their message was disseminated through "Free World Radio,"which broadcast "several times a week to Europe and Latin America." The Free World Association also published informational (propaganda) pamphlets, like "How the Underground Fights Back" (1942), which was "intended to show how the Underground movements are organized, how they communicate with each other, how they are undermining Axis domination and hastening the day for Allied invasion" (2).

Through local chapters in the United States, which stretched from Pittsburgh to Hollywood, the Free World Association (co)sponsored or participated in forums, debates, and mass rallies like the March 1943 "Stop Hitler Now" demonstration it convened at Madison Square Garden along with the American Jewish Committee, the Church Peace Union, and the two major labor groups: the AFL and the CIO, among others. Its activities in the US were similar to those of like-minded public interest organizations such as the Foreign Policy Association and, to a lesser extent, the Council on Foreign Relations. Its orientation and specific aims regarding support for World War II had much in common with the Committee to Defend America by Aiding the Allies, led by Clark Eichelberger, and its offshoot the Fight for Freedom (FFF). Another overlap was with the Union for Democratic Action, which was created in the spring of 1941 by Reinhold Niebuhr and others, including Freda Kirchwey and Arthur Schlesinger Jr., following Neibuhr's break with the Socialist Party led by the temporarily isolationist Norman Thomas. During the war the UDA—forerunner of the Americans for Democratic Action—supported Henry Wallace's crusade for 'full employment' based on the notion that, as Kirchwey put it, "only a New Deal for the World...can prevent the coming of World War III."

=== Freda Kirchwey ===
According to her biographer Sara Alpern, Freda Kirchwey enthusiastically endorsed the "Free world group and its publication," so much so that she "lent her editor Robert Bendiner to serve as their managing editor, and her bookkeeper, Adeline Henkel, to help with the accounting. As a member of their International Board, she devoted time to the organization." Moreover, in 1942 Kirchwey "launched a special section of the Nation to help serve as a 'weapon in the fight for a democratic victory' by "pooling talent from Free World Association members."

=== Second Free World Congress ===
Subsequent to its founding meeting in June 1941, the Free World Association held three more national gatherings, starting with the Second World Congress on Democratic Victory and World Organization at the Commodore Hotel in New York, or the second "Free World Congress," which was attended by some two hundred people. The closing dinner on May 8 featured speeches by Walter Nash, Jan Masaryk, and Li Yu Ying. Vice-President Henry A. Wallace delivered the keynote address, "The Price of Free World Victory".

==== Henry Wallace ====
Declaring that "the march of freedom of the past one hundred and fifty years has been a long-drawn-out people's revolution," Wallace linked this struggle to the postwar order envisioned by the Free World Society, proclaiming that "the people, in their millennial and revolutionary march toward manifesting here on earth the dignity that is in every human soul, hold as their credo the Four Freedoms [worldwide freedom of speech and expression, worship, freedom from want, fear] enumerated by President Roosevelt in...1941." At the same time, the Vice-President took a swipe at Henry Luce's recent proposal: "Some have spoken of the ‘American Century.' I say that the century on which we are entering—the century that will come of this war—can be and must be the Century of the Common Man." He further concluded: “peace must mean a better standard of living…not merely in the United States and England, but also in India, Russia, China and Latin America—not merely in the United Nations, but also in Germany and Italy and Japan.” As Dolivet recounted, Wallace's widely-discussed speech was broadcast "to the C.B.S. audience over a coast-to-coast network," and "was heard by millions of listeners in this country." Meanwhile, "the summary which he delivered in Spanish was broadcast by short wave to South America where it was rebroadcast on the regular Free World programs in Uruguay, Mexico, and Cuba," and was also "sent out...to Europe and the Far East." As J. Alvarez del Vayo concluded, 'The Price of Free World Victory' "will probably be as effective in spreading democratic ideals throughout the world as any declaration made by the spokesmen of the United Nations since the beginning of the war." Wallace adapted his speech for a 1942 film, The Price of Victory, which was part of Paramount's "Victory Short" series; the following year it was republished in a book titled The Century of the Common Man, which was reviewed favorably in Free World.

=== Free World Radio ===
By June 1942 "the voice of Free World" was being heard, as described by J. A. del Vayo, "from Bulgaria to Argentina, through short-wave broadcasts," including "everyday to the occupied countries in a different language." At the same time, WMCA listeners in New York could tune-in to regular a weekly "Report from the Underground."

==== Orson Welles ====
In the words of Orson Welles biographer Joseph McBride, having been befriended by Dolivet, the prominent American actor/director began "serving as Free World's voice in print and on radio."

=== Third Free World Congress ===
The Third Free World Congress met from October 28–31, 1943 in New York, with a parallel Latin American event held in Montevideo in early December. This combined body, "representing democratic organizations of more than twenty countries," urged the people of the world "to put every ounce of their effort and energies in the service of the United Nations." In a General Declaration it was pledged that the "Congress solemnly reaffirms the fundamental principles of the Free World Movement—International Democracy—Economic Democracy—Political Democracy—Democratic World Organization Based on Collective Security."

=== Fourth Free World Congress ===
The Fourth Free World Congress of 1945 had been scheduled for April 18–19 in Washington, D.C., in preparation for the United Nations meeting set to take place a week later in San Francisco. However it was postponed following Roosevelt's death on April 12, 1945. The May issue of Free World ran an editorial indicating that the Congress had been postponed until either during or after the San Francisco Conference, which closed on June 26. Free World did still publish messages in support of the UN process from Winston Churchill and Chiang Kai-shek, as well as an excerpt from a letter sent by FDR just prior to his death, which had been published in the March issue. In Roosevelt's estimation:

‘April will be a critical month in the history of human freedom. It will see the meeting in San Francisco of a great conference of the United Nations—the nations united in this war against tyranny and militarism. At that conference, the peoples of the world will decide, through their representatives and in response to their will, whether or not the best hope for peace the world has ever had will be realized. Discussions by the people of this country, and by the peoples of the freedomloving world, of the proposals which will be considered at San Francisco, are necessary, are indeed essential, if the purpose of the people to make peace and to keep peace is to be expressed in action.’

It is unclear whether or not the Fourth Free World Congress was ever officially convened.

== Louis Dolivet (Ludovic Brecher) ==
Most of the information about Louis Dolivet originates from either American or Soviet intelligence sources, and should not be completely trusted. Still, there is enough available information to piece together a biographical sketch, the broad outlines of which can seemingly be verified. Ludovic Brecher appears to have been born on March 26, 1908, in the northern Romanian village of Șanț. He became known as Louis Dolivet upon arriving in New York on January 6, 1939. In March 1942 he married actress and socialite Beatrice Whitney Straight, of the prominent Whitney family from Massachusetts and New York via London. The couple had a son, Willard Straight Dolivet, who died in a drowning accident in September 1952. They were divorced in 1949; Dolivet died in London in August 1989.

=== HUAC investigation ===
Much appears to be rooted in an "extensive investigation" conducted by the House Un-American Activities Committee (HUAC), likely in combination with the FBI and/or CIA, the results of which had not been made public until summarized in the 1950 HUAC Annual Report and entered into the Congressional Record for May 25. Some of that material made it into the work of conservative writers, like Alice Widener's 1952 piece on Communist influence in the founding of the UN for the libertarian journal The Freeman, or Karl Baarslag’s 1959 exposé on subversives linked to the American Friends Service Committee (AFSC), published in a newsletter for the Illinois-based Church League of America (CLA).

Having seen Dolivet listed in a 1950 AFSC bulletin as, among other things, 'an international roving correspondent for the New York Post,' Baarslag referred to the Congressional Record, citing pages 7806–7808, which gave detailed information about the man "who is not Dolivet at all but really Ludwig Brecher of probable Rumanian extraction." A former director of research for HUAC who might have also served at the Russian Desk for the Office of Naval Intelligence during World War II, Baarslag suggested that Brecher "had lived for a time in the small French village of D'Olivet from which he derived the name he used in this country." Moreover, an Illinois Congressman had "charged that Brecher, alias Dolivet was, according to the State Department, 'a very dangerous Stalinist agent and a member of the International Communist apparatus.'" According to the December 15, 1949, issue of the French magazine, La Revue Parliamentaire, "the French secret police knew Dolivet as Ludwig Udeanu a close associate of the notorious Soviet agent Willy Muenzenberg." In Barslaag's account, "under the Comintern name of Udeanu, Dolivet had written for Inprecorr, the journal of the Communist International," and "was the brains of a Communist operation which infiltrated and took over a French paper, Le Monde. In 1932 he was in Amsterdam helping organize one of the Soviet's first world congresses for peace," and "was behind the scenes pulling wires for the Comintern at the 1933 World Committee for Struggle Against War and Fascism and in 1935 in Paris for another Soviet-instigated Universal Rally for Peace."

Barslaag also claimed that "in 1934 Dolivet was in Russia," where "he made contact with the Swedish banker Olaf Ashberg, who later...admitted that he had been very active financial agent for the Soviets...In 1937–38 Dolivet was accused of alleged embezzlement of funds raised in France in behalf of the Spanish Loyalists." He was "a French citizen by this time and a protege of Pierre Cot," and it was "Cot and Ashberg [who] allegedly financed and helped him get control of the Free World," which "later became the United Nations World." Meanwhile, "he was turned down for U.S. citizenship in 1946," despite his twenty five-days in the Army in 1943.

Based on this version of the story, "Brecher—alias Udeanu—alias Dolivet went abroad in 1950 just before a Congressional Committee could serve him with a subpoena. The U.S. Immigration Service thereupon served notice that he would not be re-admitted to the United States presumably because of his role as an international Communist agent." The HUAC report also "disclosed that Dolivet held a semiofficial position with the United Nations, as a result of which he traveled under diplomatic passport" as early as 1947. Alluding to this, Widener brings up Dolivet's work, The United Nations: A Handbook on the New World Organization, which was published "almost before the ink was dry on the Charter," and included an introduction by Secretary-General Trygve Lie dated June 26, 1946. Dolivet claimed to have fought for the French Air Force against the Nazis, before escaping to Manhattan sometime either just before or after the Fall of France in June 1940. For instance as reported in the Pittsburgh Press, Dolivet, "on crutches because of a leg injury received shortly after France capitulated," spoke to a May 1941 local gathering of the Foreign Policy Association, where "the former French air gunner painted a sorrowful picture of conditions in occupied France." Yet on that same occasion Dolivet described injuring himself not in battle, but rather in a shipboard fall en route from Europe. And, while he may have come and gone subsequently, there is a record of Dolivet/Brecher having left France and arrived in New York on January 6, 1939.

=== Links to KGB ===
Regardless of specific details, sources based in Soviet intelligence seem to corroborate the basic outline of the Dolivet/Brecher saga as detailed by HUAC. For instance in Last of the Cold War Spies: The Life of Michael Straight (2005), journalist Roland Perry confirms that "Louis Dolivet" was the alias of Ludovic Brecher, who was indeed a secret Comintern agent linked to Pierre Cot and the notorious German-born Soviet agitprop expert, Willi Münzenberg. Dolivet was also closely associated with Michael Whitney Straight, who he met at a 1937 rally in Paris organized by one of Münzenberg's front groups; Straight later introduced Dolivet to his sister in Washington DC.

==== Beatrice and Michael Straight ====
Beatrice and Michael Whitney Straight were the children of heiress Dorothy Payne Whitney, who with her first husband Willard Dickerman Straight, had co-founded The New Republic as financial backers to Herbert Croly and Walter Lippmann in 1914. In 1926, with her second husband Leonard Knight Elmhirst, Dorothy (Whitney) Elmhirst founded Dartington Hall, a progressive experimental boarding school in rural England. A record in the Beatrice Straight papers at the Dartington archive describes Louis Dolivet as a "political theorist and speaker, publisher and editor of Free World magazine [who] worked with Orson Welles," and "was also a film producer. Accused of having been a Communist agent in the interwar period, he was banned by the US State Department from re-entering America in 1949 when he returned to France." As described in his New York Times obituary, Michael Straight attended Dartington Hall, then the London School of Economics for a year before going to Trinity College at Cambridge University in 1934, where "he became a member of the circle around John Maynard Keynes, socialized with young radical patricians like himself and joined the Communist Party...mostly in sympathy with its Popular Front objectives of supporting democrat governments against the rising tide of Nazism." He was enlisted into the (now infamous) Cambridge Five Soviet spy ring led by Guy Burgess, Kim Philby, Donald Maclean and Anthony Blunt, which successfully penetrated Britain's MI-6 on behalf of the Kremlin during the early Cold War. He was recruited by Blunt, who according to The Telegraph, was also briefly his lover. Straight then moved to Washington, D.C., in 1937 where, "after spurning Blunt's order that he take a job on Wall Street – he worked as an economist for the Department of State. He continued to pursue both politics and his stratospheric social life, sharing a house with Joseph Alsop, drafting speeches for and dining with the Roosevelts, and writing his analytic memorandums, some of which he passed on to Soviet intelligence." Between 1937 and 1942, Straight worked in various capacities for the State Department and was perhaps also on the payroll of the Department of the Interior. He became The New Republic's Washington correspondent in 1940, and assumed the magazine's editorship the following year, turning its stance away from neutrality in the war against the Axis powers. He served in the US Air Force from 1942 to 1945 and learned to fly a B-17 bomber, but was never stationed abroad. After the war he returned to TNR as its publisher, and was responsible for hiring Henry Wallace as the magazine's editor after the former vice-president was fired from his post as Truman's secretary of agriculture in September 1946. Resuming editorship when Wallace departed in 1947 to launch his 1948 Progressive Party presidential campaign, Straight left the helm of The New Republic in 1956.

Like many New Deal-era leftists who supported both Stalin and Roosevelt in the 1930s, Straight evolved into a liberal anti-Communist during the start of the Cold War. His changed views were reflected in a late 1940s/ early 1950s TNR editorial policy that supported the Truman Doctrine and the Marshall Plan, while opposing McCarthyism. Straight's new-found cold war liberalism was clearly expressed in his 1954 book Trial by Television, which was critical of both Communism and right-wing anti-Communism. In his 1993 memoir, After Long Silence, he confessed his involvement in the Cambridge spy ring, seeking to both explain and exonerate himself by contending that he was recruited reluctantly, and never passed classified information to his Soviet contact, "Michael Green." He also claimed to have broken with the Party in 1941. Privately, Straight first confessed in 1963 to family friend and fellow cold war liberal Arthur Schlesinger Jr., who was then serving as a special assistant to John F. Kennedy. Having been invited to work in the White House and concerned about undergoing a background check, Straight confided to Schlesinger who sent him to the Department of Justice, which helped trigger an investigation that resulted in Anthony Blunt's exposure. With Straight's previous activities remaining undisclosed, he maintained good standing in Washington, and served from 1969 to 1977 as the deputy chairman of the National Endowment for the Arts. He died in January 2004, at the age of 87.

=== Dolivet and Welles ===
Orson Welles and his wife Rita Hayworth were among Louis Dolivet and Beatrice Straight's frequent guests when they lived at Dorothy Whitney Straight Elmhirst's Old Westbury, Long Island estate. While it is unclear how they met, Dolivet mentored Welles politically and the two men developed a close friendship starting in the early 1940s. Dolivet and Welles collaborated on several projects, most notably the 1955 six-episode British television series Around the World with Orson Welles, and the film Mr. Arkadin, released that same year in Spain. A dispute over the making of Mr. Arkadin led to a falling-out between Welles and Dolivet.

The film producer had hoped to sponsor a political career for the popular actor, perhaps a bid for Senate from Wisconsin or California; Dolivet might have even been grooming Welles for a post as the first Secretary-General of the United Nations. In the meantime, he brought him on board as an associate editor of Free World, which Roland Perry also claims had been started in Europe. As described by Perry, dolivet's influence was such that Welles was soon "making speeches at Free World dinners and functions and to politicians in Washington." All of this is as recounted by former KGB agent Alexander Vassiliev, co-author (with Allen Weinstein) of The Haunted Wood: Soviet Espionage in American—The Stalin Era (1999), and (with John Earl Haynes and Harvey Klehr) Spies: The Rise and Fall of the KGB in America (2009). In conjunction with their work on the latter, Haynes and Klehr published "Alexander Vassiliev’s Notebooks: Provenance and Documentation of Soviet Intelligence Activities in the United States," which is online at The Woodrow Wilson International Center for Scholars. Additionally, Haynes compiled a useful "Vassiliev Notebooks Concordance File," which contains the following entry on page 42:

Dolivet, Louis: Brother-in-law of Michael Straight and head of the Free World Association. Also know [sic] as Ludovici Udeanu and Ludwig Brecher. Romanian born, naturalized French cititizen [sic] active in French Communist politics in the 1930s in association with Pierre Cot and Willi Munzenberg and a leader of Rassemblement Universal Pour La Paix, an anti-Fascist front with strong

Communist and Soviet ties. Escaped the fall of France and came to the United States in 1940. Brother-in-law of Michael Straight. Later a well-know [sic] figure in the Hollywood movie industry.

==== Deportation and after ====
According to the 1950 HUAC report, "as a result of the investigation and hearings held by the committee, Dolivet's contract with the United Nations has not been renewed, and it is the committee's understanding that he was removed from editorship of the United Nations World. Dolivet is presently...excludable for admission to the United States under the provisions of the Wood-McCarran Communist Control Act." By November 1950 he was indeed officially disallowed from reentering the United States, even for his son's funeral, after having eluding authorities who wanted to compel him to remain in the country for HUAC questioning. As of December 1952, Dolivet/Brecher was in Paris, publishing a magazine called Fighting Democracy.

== Notable contributors ==
- Julio Álvarez del Vayo (9)
- Juan Jose Amezaga (1)
- Norman Angell (30)
- Max Ascoli (8)
- Francis Biddle (1)
- Eduard Benes (2)
- Abdul Rahman Hassan Azzam (1)
- Winston Churchill (1)
- Louis Dolivet (43)
- William O. Douglas (49)
- Theodore Dreiser (2)
- Clark M. Eichelberger (4)
- Albert Einstein (2)
- Thomas K. Finletter (2)
- Sigmund Freud (1)
- Ernest Hemingway (1)
- Cordell Hull (1)
- Harold Ickes (1)
- Chiang Kai-shek (1)
- Freda Kirchwey (1)
- Fiorello La Guardia (1)
- Max Lerner (8)
- Archibald MacLeish (4)
- Thomas Mann (2)
- Jan Masaryk (3)
- Walter Millis (7)
- Edgar Ansel Mowrer (1)
- Philip Murray (2)
- Gunnar Myrdal (1)
- Claude Pepper (4)
- Eleanor Roosevelt (1)
- Franklin Roosevelt (1)
- James Roosevelt (1)
- Bertrand Russell (3)
- Wou Saofong (3)
- Carlo Sforza (10)
- T. V. Soong (2)
- Clarence Streit (1)
- Raymond Gram Swing (1)
- The Underground Reporter (8)
- Dorothy Thompson (1)
- Robert F. Wagner (1)
- Henry A. Wallace (4)
- Orson Welles (10)
- Sumner Welles (1)
- Richard Wright (1)
- Li Yu Ying (8)
