= Louis Dolivet =

French writer, editor and film producer (1908–1989)

- Born: Ludovici Udeanu; March 26, 1908; Újradna, Austria-Hungary (now Șanț, Bistrița-Năsăud County, Romania)
- Died: August 1989 (aged 81); London, England
- Other name: Ludovic Brecher
- Occupations: Writer, editor, film producer
- Known for: Editor of Free World
- Spouse: Beatrice Straight (m. 1942; div. 1949)
- Children: 1

Louis Dolivet, born as Ludovici Udeanu (March 26, 1908 – August 1989) was an émigré writer, editor of Free World, film producer, and alleged Soviet spy born in Austria-Hungary, who later obtained French citizenship. From 1942 to 1949, he was married to Academy Award and Tony Award-winning actress Beatrice Whitney Straight, of the prominent American Whitney family.

== Early life ==
Ludovic Brecher was born on March 26, 1908, in the Austro-Hungarian village of Újradna, Beszterce-Naszód County, now Șanț, Bistrița-Năsăud County, Romania. He became known as Louis Dolivet upon arriving in New York on January 6, 1939. Dolivet claimed to have fought for the French Air Force against the Nazis before escaping to Manhattan sometime either just before or after the Fall of France in June 1940. The Pittsburgh Press reported that Dolivet, "on crutches because of a leg injury received shortly after France capitulated," spoke to a local gathering of the Foreign Policy Association in May 1941, where "the former French air gunner painted a sorrowful picture of conditions in occupied France." On the same occasion, Dolivet described injuring himself not in battle but rather in a shipboard fall en route from Europe.

== Career ==
=== Free World ===
From 1941 to 1946, Dolivet was the editor of Free World, a monthly magazine of the International Free World Association, published by Free World, Inc. in New York City. Free World was militantly anti-Fascist, articulating the perspective of left-liberal Popular Front intellectuals and international political figures who supported the Allies in World War II and championed the creation of the United Nations as a successor to the failed post-World War I League of Nations.

Following the final issue of Free World in December 1946, Dolivet launched a new magazine called United Nations World, its first issue appearing in February 1947, which he eventually abandoned in 1950, having returned to France in 1949 and subsequently being banned from reentering the United States upon suspicion of having ties to Communism. United Nations World lasted under different editorship until 1953.

=== Film and television ===
Dolivet and his wife, an actress, frequently had Orson Welles and his wife Rita Hayworth over as guests when they lived at Dorothy Whitney Straight Elmhirst's Old Westbury, Long Island estate. Dolivet was said to have mentored Welles politically, and the two men developed a close friendship that began in the early 1940s. Dolivet and Welles collaborated on several projects, most notably the 1955 six-episode British television series Around the World with Orson Welles, and the film Mr. Arkadin, released that same year in Spain. A dispute over the making of Mr. Arkadin led to a falling-out between Welles and Dolivet.

Dolivet was reportedly trying to groom Welles for a political career, including a bid for the Senate in Wisconsin or California; or internationally as Secretary-General of the United Nations. Welles was brought on as an associate editor of Free World. Dolivet's influence was such that Welles was soon "making speeches at Free World dinners and functions and to politicians in Washington," as recounted by former KGB agent Alexander Vassiliev, co-author (with Allen Weinstein) of The Haunted Wood: Soviet Espionage in American—The Stalin Era (1999), and (with John Earl Haynes and Harvey Klehr) Spies: The Rise and Fall of the KGB in America (2009).

== HUAC investigation ==
In the 1950s, an "extensive investigation" was conducted of Dolivet by the House Un-American Activities Committee (HUAC). Dolivet was listed in a 1950 American Friends Service Committee (AFSC) bulletin as, among other things, 'an international roving correspondent for the New York Post,' Karl Baarslag, former Director of Research for HUAC, referred to the Congressional Record, which gave detailed information about the man "who is not Dolivet at all but Ludwig Brecher of probable Rumanian extraction." Baarslag suggested that Brecher "had lived for a time in the small French village of D'Olivet from which he derived the name he used in this country." Moreover, an Illinois Congressman had "charged that Brecher, alias Dolivet was, according to the State Department, 'a very dangerous Stalinist agent and a member of the International Communist apparatus.'" According to the December 15, 1949, the French magazine, La Revue Parliamentaire, "the French secret police knew Dolivet as Ludwig Udeanu, a close associate of the notorious Soviet agent Willy Muenzenberg." In Barslaag's account, "under the Comintern name of Udeanu, Dolivet had written for Inprecorr, the journal of the Communist International," and "was the brains of a Communist operation which infiltrated and took over a French paper, Le Monde. In 1932 he was in Amsterdam helping organize one of the Soviet's first world congresses for peace," and "was behind the scenes pulling wires for the Comintern at the 1933 World Committee for Struggle Against War and Fascism and in 1935 in Paris for another Soviet-instigated Universal Rally for Peace."

Barslaag also claimed that "in 1934 Dolivet was in Russia," where "he made contact with the Swedish banker Olaf Ashberg, who later...admitted that he had been very active financial agent for the Soviets...In 1937–38 Dolivet was accused of alleged embezzlement of funds raised in France in behalf of the Spanish Loyalists." He was "a French citizen by this time and a protege of Pierre Cot," and it was "Cot and Ashberg [who] allegedly financed and helped him get control of the Free World," which "later became the United Nations World." Meanwhile, "he was turned down for U.S. citizenship in 1946," despite his twenty five-days in the Army in 1943.

Based on this version of the story, "Brecher—alias Udeanu—alias Dolivet went abroad in 1950 just before a Congressional Committee could serve him with a subpoena. The U.S. Immigration Service thereupon served notice that he would not be re-admitted to the United States presumably because of his role as an international Communist agent." The HUAC report also "disclosed that Dolivet held a semiofficial position with the United Nations, as a result of which he traveled under diplomatic passport" as early as 1947. Alluding to this, Widener brings up Dolivet's work, The United Nations: A Handbook on the New World Organization, which was published "almost before the ink was dry on the Charter," and included an introduction by Secretary-General Trygve Lie dated June 26, 1946.

Soviet intelligence uncovered later appears to corroborate the basic outline of the Dolivet story as detailed by HUAC. In Last of the Cold War Spies: The Life of Michael Straight by journalist Roland Perry confirms that "Louis Dolivet" was the alias of Ludovic Brecher, who was indeed a secret Comintern agent linked to Pierre Cot and Michael Straight.

=== Michael Straight ===
During a 1937 rally in Paris, organized by one of German-born Soviet agitprop expert Willi Münzenberg's front groups, Dolivet met Michael Straight. Straight's parents, heiress Dorothy Payne Whitney and Willard Dickerman Straight, had co-founded The New Republic as financial backers to Herbert Croly and Walter Lippmann in 1914. Straight attended Dartington Hall, then the London School of Economics before going to Trinity College at Cambridge in 1934, where "he became a member of the circle around John Maynard Keynes, socialized with young radical patricians like himself and joined the Communist Party...mostly in sympathy with its Popular Front objectives of supporting democrat governments against the rising tide of Nazism." Straight was enlisted into the Cambridge Five Soviet spy ring led by Guy Burgess, Kim Philby, Donald Maclean and Anthony Blunt, which successfully penetrated Britain's MI-6 on behalf of the Kremlin during the early Cold War. He was recruited by Blunt, who according to The Telegraph, was also briefly his lover. In 1937, Straight moved to Washington, D.C., where he worked as an economist for the Department of State. He continued to pursue both politics and his stratospheric social life, sharing a house with Joseph Alsop, drafting speeches for and dining with the Roosevelts, and writing his analytic memorandums, some of which he passed on to Soviet intelligence."

After serving in the State Department and the Department of the Interior between 1937 and 1942, Straight became The New Republic's Washington correspondent in 1940, and editor in 1941. After serving in the US Air Force from 1942 to 1945, he returned to The New Republic as its publisher, and hired Henry A. Wallace, the former 33rd Vice President of the United States from 1941 to 1945 and the Secretary of Commerce from 1945 to 1946, as the magazine's editor. Straight resumed the editorship when Wallace departed in 1947 to launch his 1948 Progressive Party presidential campaign, Straight left the helm of The New Republic in 1956.

In his 1993 memoir, After Long Silence, Straight confessed his involvement in the Cambridge spy ring, seeking to both explain and exonerate himself by contending that he was recruited reluctantly, and never passed classified information to his Soviet contact, "Michael Green." He also claimed to have broken with the Party in 1941. Privately, Straight first confessed in 1963 to family friend and fellow cold war liberal Arthur Schlesinger Jr., who was then serving as a special assistant to John F. Kennedy. Having been invited to work in the White House and concerned about undergoing a background check, Straight confided to Schlesinger who sent him to the Department of Justice, which helped trigger an investigation that resulted in Anthony Blunt's exposure. With Straight's previous activities remaining undisclosed, he maintained good standing in Washington, and served from 1969 to 1977 as the deputy chairman of the National Endowment for the Arts.

== Deportation and after ==
According to the 1950 HUAC report, "as a result of the investigation and hearings held by the committee, Dolivet's contract with the United Nations has not been renewed, and it is the committee's understanding that he was removed from the editorship of the United Nations World. Dolivet is presently... excludable for admission to the United States under the provisions of the Wood-McCarran Communist Control Act." By November 1950, he was officially disallowed from reentering the United States after having eluded authorities who wanted to compel him to remain in the country for HUAC questioning.

As of December 1952, Dolivet was in Paris, publishing a magazine called Fighting Democracy.

== Personal life ==
Dolivet was introduced by Michael Straight to his sister, actress Beatrice Whitney Straight, in Washington, D.C., and several months later, on February 22, 1942, Dolivet married her in Polk County, Iowa. At the time, Dolivet was a speaker at the National Farm Institute and Straight was in the middle of the mid-west road show of Twelfth Night. Straight's mother, Dorothy Elmhirst and stepfather, Leonard K. Elmhirst attended the wedding, along with her brother Michael Straight and his wife, Belinda Crompton. At the time of the wedding, Straight's elder brother, Whitney Straight, had been missing since August 1941, when his plane was shot down on the French coast.

On May 24, 1949, Straight obtained a divorce from Dolivet in Reno, Nevada. Together they had one child:

- Willard Whitney Straight Dolivet (1945–1952)

Dolivet died in London in August 1989.

=== Death of son ===
In 1952, their 7-year-old son, Willard, accidentally drowned in a pond on Straight's farm in Armonk while playing in a small row boat tied to the dock. The boy was found by Straight's second husband, actor Peter Cookson. Dolivet, who was living in Paris at the time, was refused a visa and, therefore, unable to fly to the United States to attend the funeral because of his allegedly pro-communist activities.
