= Around the World with Orson Welles =

1955 British ITV television series by Orson Welles

- Written by: Orson Welles
- Directed by: Orson Welles
- Starring: Orson Welles
- Country of origin: United Kingdom
- Original language: English
- No. of episodes: 6

Production
- Producer: Louis Dolivet
- Running time: 26 minutes

Original release
- Network: ITV
- Release: 7 October – 16 December 1955

Around the World with Orson Welles is a series of six short travelogues originally written and directed by Orson Welles for Associated-Rediffusion in 1955, for Britain's then-new ITV channel. Despite its title emphasizing the world, it was entirely filmed in Europe. Among other incidents in the episodes, Welles visited Jean Cocteau and Juliette Gréco in Paris, attended a bullfight in Madrid (with co-hosts Kenneth Tynan and Elaine Dundy) and visited the Basque Country.

== Production ==
In March 1955, Associated-Rediffusion had originally commissioned a series of 26 half-hour programmes, but in the end, only 6 were broadcast, and even then, in rather troubled circumstances. Before a contract had even been signed, Welles had rapidly shot a pilot episode himself (the third episode broadcast, "Revisiting Vienna") using loaned money and on the basis of an informal agreement. As Welles had made an agreement with producer Louis Dolivet in 1953 to work exclusively for him (beginning with their troubled film production Mr. Arkadin), Dolivet was brought on board as the series producer.

The filming schedule was ambitious. Once the contract was signed, Welles was expected to make a further 25 episodes in 25 weeks spread out over nine months, with the first broadcast scheduled for September 1955. However, Welles's other commitments interfered with his ability to meet deadlines, and much of the series was left incomplete. Welles spent much of 1955 working on writing, directing and acting in his London stage production Moby Dick—Rehearsed, and after that flopped on the West End, he switched to shooting an (aborted) film adaptation of the play, first in London, and then in Rome – filming Moby Dick—Rehearsed in Rome was under the pretext of working on the Around the World with Orson Welles TV series.

Although Associated-Rediffusion retained a number of rights, including approval of episode synopses, script approval, music approval, and viewing rights for the rushes and final cut, film scholars Jean-Pierre Berthomé and Francois Thomas argue that Welles remained in control much of the time, due to the fragmentary, piecemeal way in which much of the footage was shot, with the writer/director/presenter being the only person who could piece it all together. For instance, Welles shot most of his interviews with only one camera, focussed on the interviewee, and all of the reverse shots of him asking questions had to be shot later in a studio. Frequently, Welles's entire episodes would be heavily studio-dependent; his entire participation in an episode on bullfighting consisted of filming himself entering and sitting down at a bullfight, then filming the bullfight; and the reconstructing part of the audience seats in a studio, so he could record his bullfight commentary months after having watched it.

The first episode missed its initial broadcast deadline, and it was still not finished when it went out the following month – Welles had to provide the voiceover himself, live from Rome, when it was broadcast in the UK. The second episode was missing a voiceover in several sections. The third and fifth episodes, were the most complete.

Welles had effectively abandoned the production to move back to the USA at the end of 1955, so the fourth and sixth episodes were particularly badly hit. Episode four, on the Paris district of St. Germain des Prés, had to be padded out with stock footage from other documentaries. Episode six had only half the necessary footage, so it was padded out by having two friends of Welles's, Kenneth Tynan and Elaine Dundy (who had been present at the same bullfight he recorded), become guest hosts for the first half of the episode, until the existing footage of Welles could be used. The seventh episode was not originally completed or broadcast.

== Episodes ==
No.	Title	Original release date
1	"Pays Basque I (The Basque Country)"	7 October 1955
2	"Pays Basque II (La Pelote basque)"	21 October 1955
3	"Revisiting Vienna" "The Third Man Returns to Vienna"	4 November 1955
4	"St.-Germain-des-Prés"	18 November 1955
5	"Chelsea Pensioners"	2 December 1955
6	"Madrid Bullfight"	16 December 1955

For many years, it was believed that the third episode, "Revisiting Vienna", also known as "The Third Man Returns to Vienna", (Welles starred in The Third Man in 1949) was lost. In June 2011, the episode was found in the archives at the Wisconsin Historical Society Center for Film and Theater Research in Madison, Wisconsin by Ray Langstone, completing the series.

Orson Welles also worked on a seventh episode entitled "The Tragedy of Lurs", which was not completed. The documentary was based on the controversial Dominici murder case in France, and contained interviews with many of the principals shortly after the trial. A version of the film, using Welles's footage and additional sound, was constructed by French filmmaker Christophe Cognet and integrated into his 52-minute documentary titled The Dominici Affair by Orson Welles (2000).

== Home video release ==
Sets containing what were then thought to be the five sole surviving broadcast episodes and "The Dominici Affair" were separately released on both VHS and DVD. Then, in 2015, to mark the centenary of Welles's birth, the British Film Institute released both DVD and limited-edition Blu-ray sets containing all six broadcast episodes and The Dominici Affair by Orson Welles.

== See also ==
- La pelota vasca
