= The Child and the Killer =

1959 British film by Max Varnel

- British quad poster
- Directed by: Max Varnel
- Written by: Brian Clemens; Eldon Howard
- Produced by: Edward J. Danziger; Harry Lee Danziger
- Starring: Patricia Driscoll; Robert Arden; Ryck Rydon; Richard Williams
- Cinematography: James Wilson (as Jimmy Wilson)
- Edited by: Maurice Rootes
- Music by: Albert Elms
- Production company: Danziger Productions
- Distributed by: United Artists Corporation (UK)
- Release date: February 1959 (UK)
- Running time: 65 minutes
- Country: United Kingdom
- Language: English

The Child and the Killer (also known as The Man in the Shadows) is a 1959 British low-budget second-feature crime film directed by Max Varnel and starring Patricia Driscoll and Robert Arden. It was written by Brian Clemens and Eldon Howard and produced by the Danzigers.

== Plot ==
Mather, a US Army officer, is on the run after committing murder. He invades the home of the widowed Peggy and orders her son Tommy at gunpoint to guide him through the backwaters of the English countryside to safety, but he fails to reckon with Joe, a U.S. Army captain, who is in love with Tommy's mother.

== Cast ==
- Patricia Driscoll as Peggy
- Robert Arden as Joe
- Richard Williams as Tommy
- Ryck Rydon as Mather
- John McLaren as Major Finch
- Robert Raglan as Inspector
- Gary Thorne as Prior
- Gordon Sterne as Sergeant
- Frank Ellement as White

== Critical reception ==
The Monthly Film Bulletin wrote: "Although this highly concentrated, small-budget thriller is weak in dialogue and over-generous in dramatic licence, it is convincingly enough acted, particularly by Richard Williams as the boy. When the search gets under way and dialogue is at a minimum, Max Varnel's direction becomes more forceful and the tension of the last scenes is quite effectively held."

TV Guide called it a "routine crime melodrama".

AllMovie thought the film had "elements in common with the much-later Kevin Costner vehicle A Perfect World [1993]".
