= The Third Man (novel) =

1950 novella by Graham Greene

- Book jacket for The Third Man
- Author: Graham Greene
- Language: English
- Genre: Novel
- Publisher: William Heinemann
- Publication date: 1950
- Publication place: United Kingdom
- Media type: Print (hardback & paperback)
- Pages: 157

The Third Man is a novella by English author Graham Greene. It is set in post-World War II Vienna, a city divided among the Allied powers and rife with intrigue. Originally written in 1948 as a treatment for the 1949 film of the same name directed by Carol Reed, the story was later published as a standalone work in 1950.

== Plot summary ==
The narrative follows Rollo Martins, a British writer of pulp Westerns, who arrives in Vienna at the invitation of his oldest and closest friend Harry Lime, only to discover that Lime has recently died in a suspicious traffic accident. At Lime's funeral, Martins meets Major Calloway, a British military policeman, who hints at Lime's involvement in criminal activities.

Martins' affection and loyalty to Lime drive him to delve into the circumstances surrounding his friend's death, beginning his own investigation. He encounters inconsistencies in the accounts of Lime's death, particularly concerning a mysterious "third man" seen at the scene. As Martins delves deeper, he uncovers a web of corruption and deceit involving Lime's participation in the black-market sale of diluted penicillin, which has led to numerous deaths.

Then Martins discovers that Lime is alive, having faked his death to evade capture. A tense confrontation ensues, culminating in a dramatic chase through Vienna's sewers. Ultimately, Martins is faced with a moral dilemma that tests his loyalties and sense of justice.

== Characters ==
- Rollo Martins, an English writer of pulp Westerns and protagonist of the novella
- Harry Lime, Martins' old friend
- Anna Schmidt, a Hungarian actress and Lime's devoted lover
- Major Calloway, a British military police officer who informs Martins about Lime's illicit activities and seeks his assistance
- Kurtz, an associate of Lime's who provides conflicting accounts of Lime's death
- Dr. Winkler, a physician connected to Lime's illicit activities
- Colonel Cooler, another of Lime's associates, whose evasive behavior complicates Martins' investigation
- Herr Koch, the porter at Lime's apartment building, who offers crucial information about the circumstances of Lime's supposed death

== Development ==
Greene stated in the preface that he had written the opening paragraph "twenty years before" on the back of an envelope before Alexander Korda approached him about writing a screenplay. He felt he needed to write the story first, though he initially did not intend to publish it. During filming, Greene and Reed had daily discussions and made changes; the biggest change was one that Greene opposed, the "unhappy ending."

== Reception ==
Kirkus Reviews wrote that "this although it may not be as 'finished' (the author) as the film for which it was written, is still a highly effective experience in suspense."

The Crisis magazine reviewer felt the book "brilliantly captures Vienna not as we know it now—a museum housed inside The Ring—but as it was re-becoming the capital it is today".

== Themes ==
The book delves into several interwoven themes of friendship, betrayal, and the moral complexities of postwar Europe, all set against the backdrop of a city struggling with the aftermath of conflict.

=== Friendship and betrayal ===
At the heart of the novella is the profound friendship between Rollo Martins and Harry Lime. Martins' unwavering loyalty drives him to investigate the circumstances of Lime's death in Vienna, only to uncover unsettling truths about his friend's involvement in criminal activities. This revelation forces Martins to grapple with feelings of betrayal, challenging his perceptions of loyalty and morality.

=== Moral ambiguity ===
The narrative explores the blurred lines between right and wrong in a war-torn society. Characters often operate in shades of gray, making choices that reflect the complexities of survival and ethics in a fractured world. Martins' journey from naivety to a more nuanced understanding of morality underscores this theme.

=== Illusion versus reality ===
Set against the backdrop of a decimated Vienna, the story contrasts appearances with underlying truths. The city's façade masks a hub of corruption and deceit, mirroring the characters' own duplicities. Martins' initial idealization of Lime is systematically dismantled as he uncovers the grim realities of his friend's actions.

=== Postwar disillusionment ===
The novella captures the disillusionment prevalent in postwar Europe. The shattered cityscape of Vienna serves as a metaphor for the collapse of traditional values and the pervasive sense of cynicism. Through its characters and setting, the story reflects the erosion of idealism in the face of harsh realities.

== Film ==
The Third Man was adapted into a film in 1949, directed by Carol Reed and written by Greene. The film stars Joseph Cotten as Holly Martins, Orson Welles as Harry Lime, Alida Valli as Anna Schmidt, and Trevor Howard as Major Calloway. The Third Man received critical acclaim and won the Grand Prix at the 1949 Cannes Film Festival.
