= Robert Arden =

American actor (1922–2004)

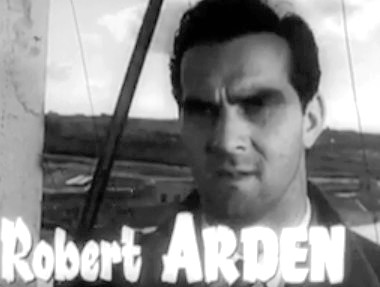
- Arden in a scene from Mr. Arkadin.
- Born: 11 December 1922; London
- Died: 25 March 2004 (aged 81); London

Robert Arden (11 December 1922 – 25 March 2004) was a British-American film, television, and radio actor born in London. He worked and lived mostly in the United Kingdom, where he specialized in playing American characters.

== Early years ==
Arden was born from an American father and an English mother. His father had a successful career as a professional boxer after World War II. He attended "a combination of English and American schools."

== Career ==
Arden's most famous film appearance was as lead character Guy Van Stratten in Mr. Arkadin (1955), written and directed by Orson Welles. Welles had worked with Arden on the Harry Lime radio series, produced in London, and had also appreciated his performance in a London production of Guys and Dolls. He later cast the little-known actor in Mr. Arkadin, in the central role of the investigator who uncovers Arkadin's past. Reportedly, Arden was shocked that Welles might consider him for the part and initially thought that the director's phone inquiry was a crank call.

Arden's performance in Mr. Arkadin was panned by some critics: The New York Times called it "hopelessly inadequate". Film historian Jonathan Rosenbaum has defended Arden's performance, locating the problem not in the actor's work, but in "the unsavoriness and obnoxiousness of the character", who was intended by Welles to be unattractive, though he occupied in the film "the space normally reserved for charismatic heroes".

The credits of one of the film's Spanish versions misspelled Arden's name as "Bob Harden". Another Spanish print actually credited him as "Mark Sharpe".

Mr. Arkadin did poorly at the box office, though it later enjoyed a critical reappraisal. Afterwards, Arden played a few other lead roles, in films such as The Depraved (1957) and The Child and the Killer (1959). Later on, he appeared mostly in supporting roles, working in film, television, and stage productions, perhaps most memorably as a high official who is hypnotized to take his own life by the adult Damien Thorn (played by Sam Neill) in Omen III: The Final Conflict.

== Selected filmography ==
- Two Thousand Women (1944) - Dave Kennedy
- The Man from Morocco (1945) - American Sergeant
- A Matter of Life and Death (1946) - GI playing Tom Snout (uncredited)
- The Hills of Donegal (1947) - Daniel
- Mr. Arkadin (1955) - Guy Van Stratten
- Joe MacBeth (1955) - Ross
- Soho Incident (1956) - Buddy
- Bermuda Affair (1956) - Bill
- The Counterfeit Plan (1957) - Bob Fenton
- A King in New York (1957) - Liftboy
- The Depraved (1957) - Dave Dillon
- The Child and the Killer (1959) - Joe
- Never Take Sweets from a Stranger (1960) - Tom Demarest
- Call Me Bwana (1963) - 1st CIA Man
- Death Drums Along the River (1963) - Jim Hunter
- Omen III: The Final Conflict (1981) - American Ambassador
- Condorman (1981) - CIA Chief
- Ragtime (1981) - Foreman of the Jury
- The Story of Ruth (1981) - Father
- D.A.R.Y.L. (1985) - Colonel
- Among Wolves (1985) - Le général Lee W. Simon
- Little Shop of Horrors (1986) - Network Exec #1
- Strong Medicine (1986) - Dr. Potter
- Whoops Apocalypse (1988) - White House Reporter
