= Among Wolves =

1985 film

- Directed by: José Giovanni
- Written by: José Giovanni; Jean Schmitt
- Produced by: Dany Cohen
- Starring: Claude Brasseur; Jean-Hugues Anglade; Robert Arden; Niels Arestrup
- Cinematography: Jean-Francis Gondre
- Edited by: Jacqueline Thiédot
- Music by: Pino Marchese
- Production companies: Sun Mories; TF1 Films Production
- Distributed by: Acteurs Auteurs Associés (AAA)
- Release date: 31 December 1985
- Running time: 105 minutes
- Country: France
- Language: French
- Box office: $7.9 million

Among Wolves (or Les Loups entre eux) is a French drama, crime film directed by José Giovanni.

== Plot ==
A group of terrorists kidnap a US general of NATO. The viewer follows the recruitment of a commando of mercenaries (by the Secret Service) to deliver the training of the latter and the conduct of the mission.

== Cast ==
- Claude Brasseur : Lacier
- Jean-Hugues Anglade : Richard Avakian
- Robert Arden : General Lee W. Simon
- Niels Arestrup : Mike
- Gérard Darmon : The Cavale
- Bernard-Pierre Donnadieu : De Saintes
- Daniel Duval : The Gitan
- Paul Giovanni : Paul
- Lisa Kreuzer : Carla
- Jean-Roger Milo : Bastien
- Gabriel Briand : Spartacus
- Manuel Cauchi : The Italian
- Isabel García Lorca : Jennifer
- Edward Meeks : Straub
- Bernard Giraudeau
