= Third Man Museum =

Film museum in Vienna, Austria

Coordinates: 48.1963°N 16.3622°E

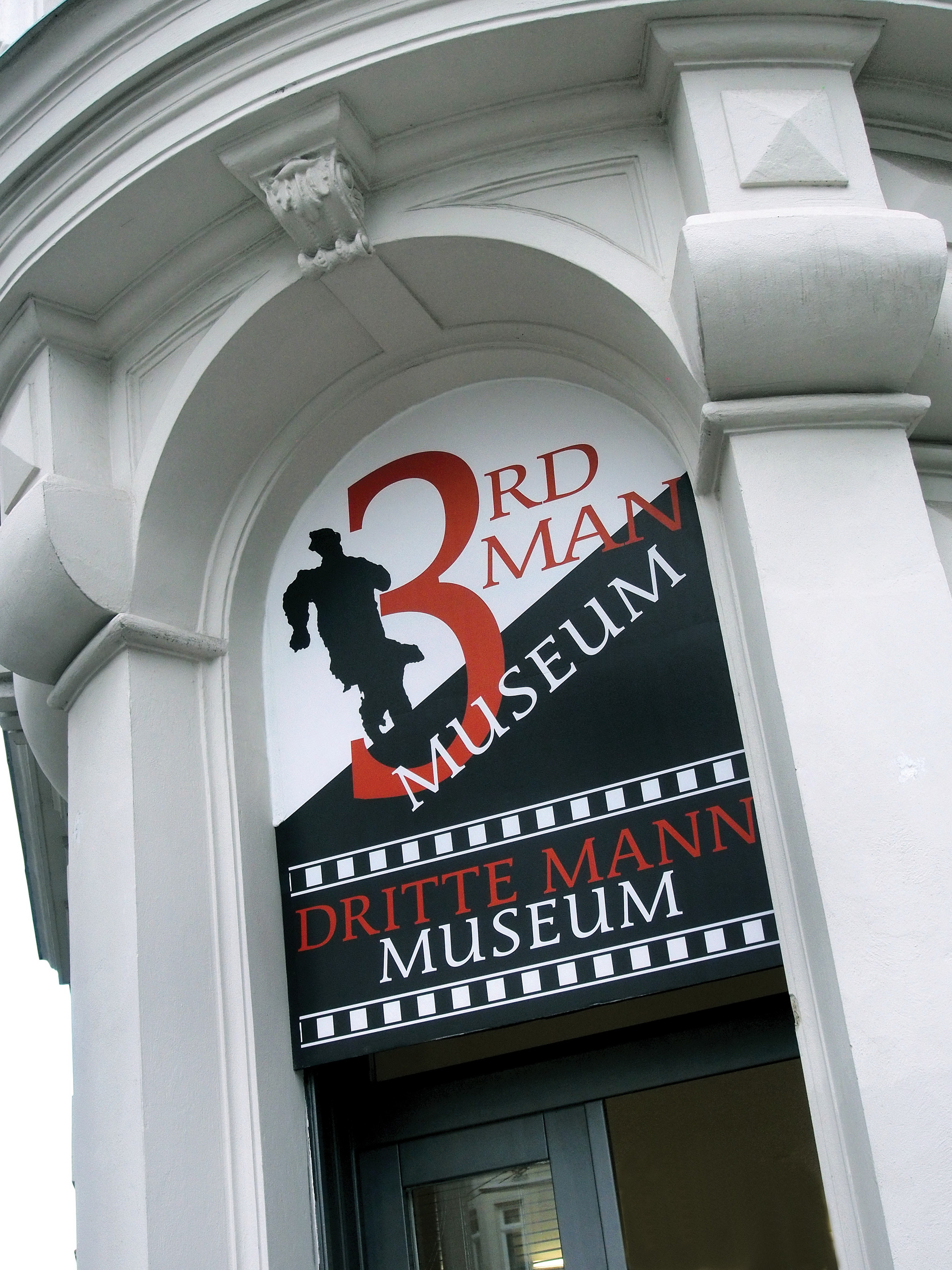
The Third Man Museum

The Dritte Mann Museum (Third Man Museum) is a film museum in the 4th district of Vienna, Austria. Opened in 2005, the museum has an area of over 400 square meters divided into 16 rooms, displaying a comprehensive collection of original exhibits based on and around the international film triumph The Third Man, directed by Carol Reed and based on a treatment by Graham Greene.

The Third Man Museum is an independent two-person project, initiated by Gerhard Strassgschwandtner. He put together the collection, whilst the design and concept came from Karin Höfler. Specialists and generalists, they created the museum from scratch. It is a private museum with no sponsors and subsidies.

The museum is aimed for film fans and contains collections on the history of pre- and post-war Vienna. An exhibition within the museum explains the historical backdrop of the film and portrays the everyday life of a city occupied by the Allies (Americans, British, Soviets and French) between 1945 and 1955, and includes many original documents from the period.

== The collection ==
About 3000 original exhibits in the museum including:

- Trevor Howard's personal script with hundreds of annotations, which he used for the filming in Vienna and in London.
- Additional documents in the form of letters and photos from the private estate of Trevor Howard.
- Film-specific correspondence from the author Graham Greene.
- The cap worn by Herbert Halbik, who in the film played the little Hansel. With an interview and film documents from Herbert Halbik.
- The zither of Anton Karas used in 1949 in London to compose the film music and to record it for the film.
- The former private exhibition of Anton Karas, which he installed in his garden house in Vienna and is today with its original hanging of documents and photos integrated into the Third Man Museum.
- Documentations about all the actors in the film.
- Two lightweight 35-mm film cameras (Debrie Parvo, models LS and K), which were rented for the British film team by the Austrian camera man Hans Schneeberger and which he used for shooting several short scenes of the film.
- A special exhibition about Orson Welles including interviews with his long-time companion and muse Oja Kodar, who gave to the museum some items from her private archive.
- The essential screenplays of The Third Man produced for the preparation and for the filming: The draft script, the second draft for the US co-producer David O. Selznick, the script used in Vienna by the cameraman of the 3rd unit Jack Causey, the release script of the British version, and the dialogue cutting continuity script.
- More than 100 editions of Graham Greene's novel The Third Man.
- More than 70 film posters of The Third Man (premieres and re-releases).
- A fully functioning Ernemann VIIb projector from 1936 on which visitors to the Third Man Museum can see a two-minute sequence of the British version screened.
- In 2023 the Third Man Museum purchased the Elchinger gravestone which is prominently pictured in all three of the film's cemetery scenes. It was then transferred to the museum.
- Around 2000 additional pieces of memorabilia from the film The Third Man.
- About 1000 documents (relevant papers, signboards, photos, etc.) about the Allied occupation of Vienna and about the-prewar period.

== Special exhibitions and events ==
The Third Man Museum annually creates temporary exhibitions:

- Until January 11, 2025: "Vienna 1945 - ZERO HOUR"

Also regular on-topic events:

- 2024: Because of 75th anniversary of the film premiere several events are planned (TBA).

== Awards ==
The museum received the Vienna Tourism Prize in 2020.

== Literature ==
- Rick Steves Vienna, Salzburg, Tirol Hachette 2017, S. 72. ISBN 978-1-6312-1458-5
