= 2nd Directors Guild of America Awards =

- Date: 1950
- Country: United States
- Presented by: Directors Guild of America

Highlights
- Best Director Feature Film: All the King's Men – Robert Rossen
- Website: https://www.dga.org/Awards/History/1940s/1949.aspx?value=1949

The 2nd Directors Guild of America Awards, honoring the outstanding directorial achievements in film in 1949, were presented in 1950.

== Winners and nominees ==
=== Film ===
Feature Film

Robert Rossen – All the King's Men

- Carol Reed – The Third Man
- Mark Robson – Champion
- Alfred L. Werker – Lost Boundaries

=== Special awards ===
Honorary Life Member Recipient

Rex Ingram
