= Schönlaterngasse =

Historic place in Vienna

Coordinates: 48°12′34″N 16°22′42″E

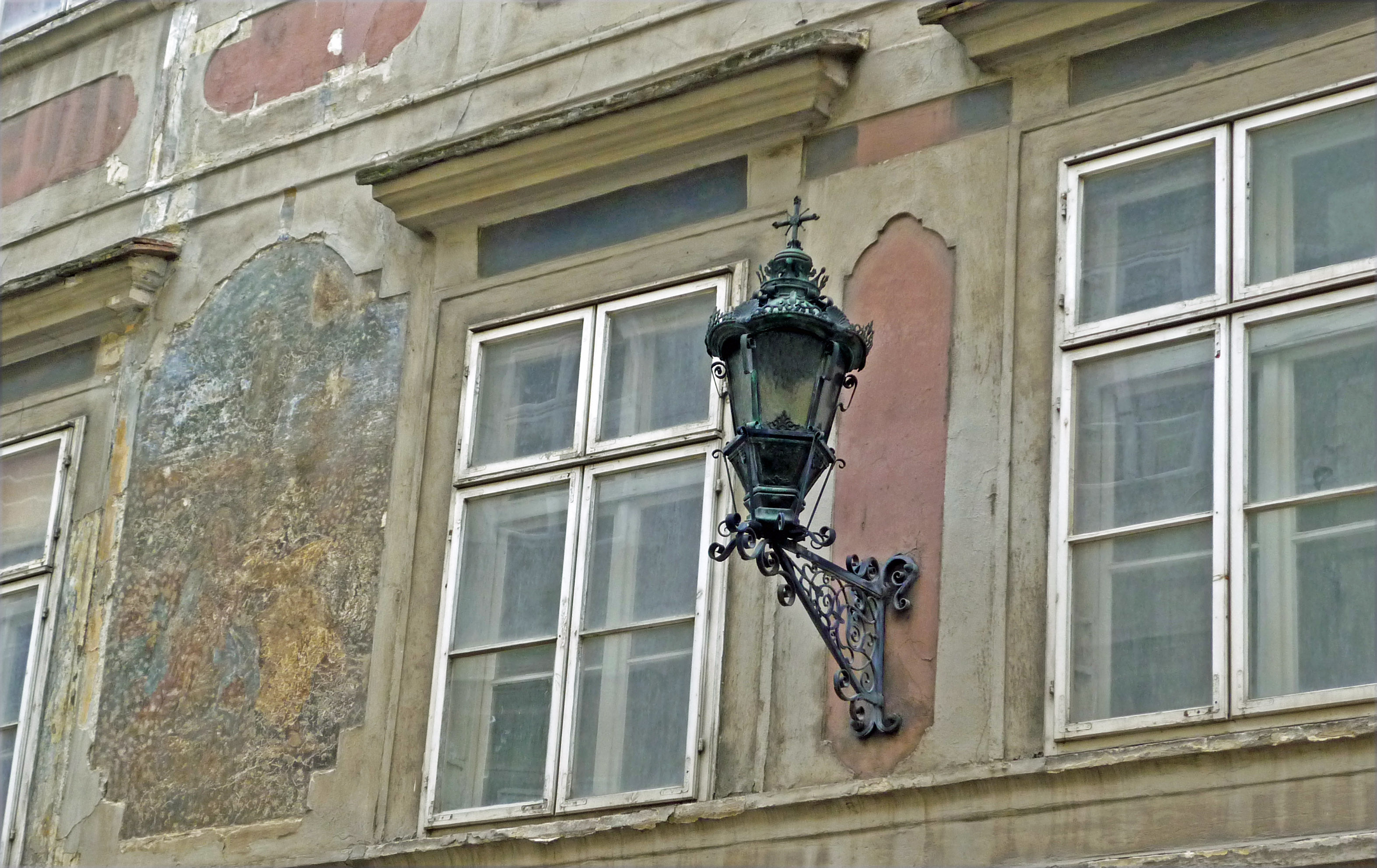
The replica of the namesake lantern

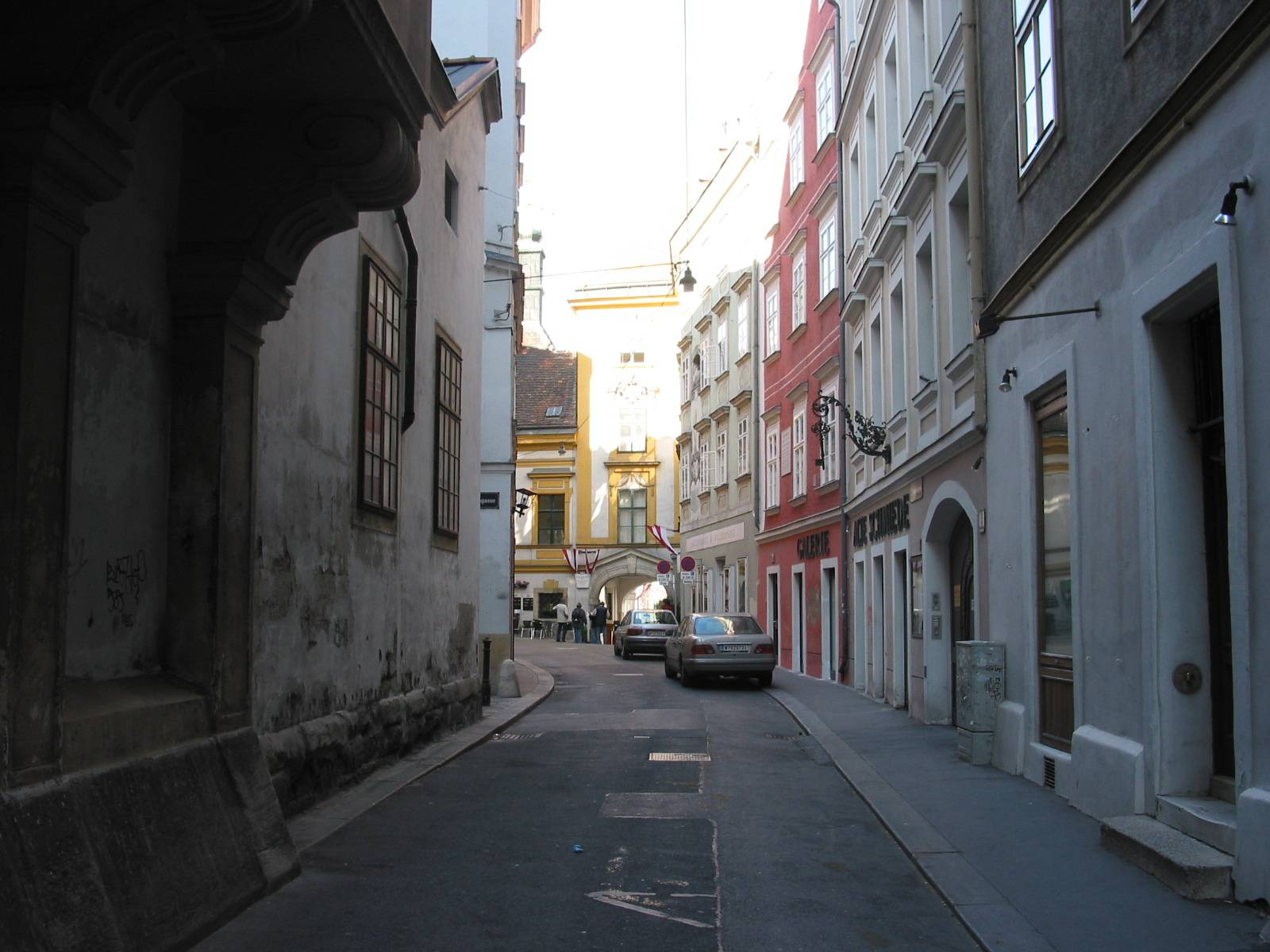
Schönlaterngasse with the entrance to the Heiligenkreuzer Hof in the background

Schönlaterngasse ("Street of the Beautiful Lantern") is a small winding alleyway in central Vienna. In the Middle Ages it was known as Straße der Herren von Heiligenkreuz ("street of the gentlemen of Heiligenkreuz"), as it passes the Heiligenkreuzer Hof ("Holy Cross courtyard"). Later on, it carried several names that still referred to the Heiligenkreuzer Hof before being named after the "beautiful lantern" in 1780. The buildings along the alley date back to Baroque times.

Schönlaterngasse originally terminated in an alleyway that was removed to make way for the Jesuitenkirche, upon which it was lengthened to Postgasse, where it still ends today.

The so-called "beautiful lantern" is located at Schönlaterngasse 6. The original lantern is currently in Vienna’s City Museum, but a replica was installed in its original location in 1971.

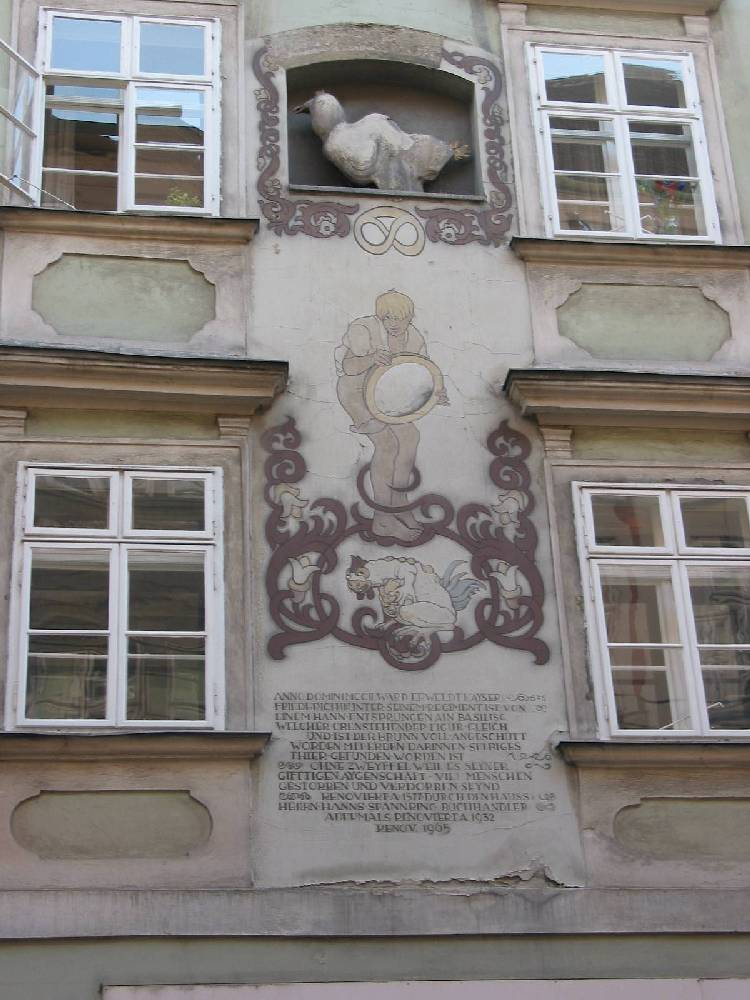
Schönlaterngasse 7 inscribed with the basilisk myth

The house opposite the lantern, Schönlaterngasse 7, is home to a well-known Viennese myth. According to this myth, on 26 June 1212 in the morning, the servant of a baker discovered a basilisk at the bottom of the well in the courtyard. The baker’s apprentice noticed the creature and subsequently destroyed it by holding a mirror to it (looking into its eyes was known to be fatal). The basilisk exploded. The facades of the house tell this tale, which was inscribed in its walls in 1932 using the original text from 1577.

An old blacksmith's smithy can be viewed at Schönlaterngasse 9, and serves as home to an art association.

The street is also home to several eating and drinking establishments today, which are open nights and evenings.

Schönlaterngasse has been on Austrian postage stamps four times. It also features in Carol Reed's film The Third Man.
