= The Depraved (1957 film) =

1957 British film by Paul Dickson

- Directed by: Paul Dickson
- Written by: Brian Clemens
- Produced by: Edward J. Danziger; Harry Lee Danziger
- Starring: Anne Heywood; Robert Arden
- Cinematography: James Wilson (as Jimmy Wilson)
- Edited by: Vera Campbell
- Music by: Albert Elms
- Release date: 1957
- Running time: 70 minutes
- Country: United Kingdom
- Language: English

The Depraved is a 1957 British second feature ('B') crime film directed by Paul Dickson and starring Anne Haywood and Robert Arden. It was written by Brian Clemens and produced by The Danzigers.

== Plot ==
US army captain Dave Dillon is stationed at an American base in the British countryside. When heading back one night, his jeep breaks down and he is forced to ask for help at a secluded mansion, Croft House. There live the Wiltons: a lonely, harassed woman, Laura, who is married to drunken, abusive Tom. Tom has recently fired all the house servants including the Italian chauffeur Tonio.

Dave is let in but as he is about to phone the base for help, Tom inadvertently fuses the house lights. Dave fixes the fusebox, and when the lights come back on Laura realises Tom has given himself an electric shock, disappointingly for her, rendering him only unconscious not dead. Dave helps Tom to bed. At the door Laura offers that Dave should borrow her car and return it the next day. She also asks Dave to post a letter for her.

Before he posts it at base camp, Dave glances at the address, and we see the letter is addressed to "Tonio Rossi Esq", care of an employment agency. Next evening Dave returns to bring back Laura's car. Tom draws Dave into an argument, suggesting that Dave's wartime experiences in Italy have turned him into a murderous animal, and pulls a gun on him to demonstrate his theory. Dave leaves angry, but contrives to return another day to see Laura with a party invitation. The commanding officer has decided to hold a party at the officers club for the local villagers.

Dave and Laura soon begin an affair. When Laura floats an idea that Dillon could murder her husband and they both could be rich, Dillon walks out on her. But he soon visits the house again with a plan to kill Tom on the night of the party, and make it look the result of his drunk driving. Tom is murdered, and he and his car dumped in the river. The body is discovered by a passing local next morning, and an investigation begun. A local policeman, Inspector Flynn, is suspicious, and the plan soon unravels as both Dave and Laura have made mistakes and Laura's car has been spotted by an AWOL soldier returning from a date. Dave is enraged when he finds Laura is already planning to claim the insurance on Tom. Dave's superior and long-time friend, Major Kellaway, visits the house and finds Laura and Tonio together. Laura tells the major that Dave did know Tom, which Dave had previously denied, and had a gambling debt with him. Dave immediately becomes the prime suspect in the murder. When he is told that he is confined to base, Dave assaults Kellaway, takes a jeep, and returns to Croft House. Dave confronts Laura, realising that she is leaving the country.

== Cast ==
- Anne Heywood as Laura Wilton
- Robert Arden as Dave Dillon
- Carroll Levis as Major Kellaway
- Basil Dignam as Tom Wilton
- Denis Shaw as Inspector Flynn
- Robert Ayres as Colonel-in-chief
- Garry Thorne as Kaufmann (as Gary Thorne)
- Hal Osmond as barman
- Gil Winfield as Sergeant U.S. Army

== Production ==
Anne Heywood had worked with Carroll Levis for a number of years on stage.

== Critical reception ==
Monthly Film Bulletin said "It is sad to find this low standard thriller, with its generally shoddy production, attributed to Paul Dickson. The principal performances are notably poor."

In British Sound Films: The Studio Years 1928–1959 David Quinlan rated the film as "poor", writing: "Very poor. Said one critic: 'The script does not call for good acting and it doesn't get it.' "

Leslie Halliwell said: "Shades of Double Indemnity, but only shades."

TV Guide wrote, "the title promises something more lurid than another B murder-mystery with an American leading man, but that's all this is."
