= A Woman's Temptation =

1959 British film by Godfrey Grayson

- Press card
- Directed by: Godfrey Grayson
- Written by: Brian Clemens; Eldon Howard
- Produced by: Edward J. Danziger; Harry Lee Danziger
- Starring: Patricia Driscoll; Robert Ayres
- Cinematography: James Wilson (as Jimmy Wilson)
- Edited by: Desmond Saunders
- Music by: Albert Elms
- Production company: Danziger Productions
- Distributed by: British Lion Film Corporation (UK)
- Release date: 1959
- Running time: 60 minutes
- Country: United Kingdom
- Language: English

A Woman's Temptation is a low budget 1959 British crime film directed by Godfrey Grayson and starring Patricia Driscoll and Robert Ayres. It was written by Brian Clemens and Eldon Howard and produced by The Danzigers.

== Premise ==
A young widow struggling as a single mother is tempted by stolen money she finds, which she hides away to use for her son's education. Unfortunately, the thieves return to find it, and have to be confronted.

== Cast ==
- Patricia Driscoll as Betty
- Robert Ayres as Mike
- John Pike as Jimmy
- Neil Hallett as Glynn
- John Longden as Inspector Syms
- Kenneth Warren as Warner
- Robert Raglan as burly policeman
- Gordon Needham as Sergeant Martin
- Frazer Hines as Tommy

== Critical reception ==
The Monthly Film Bulletin wrote: "A drab and dispirited film which moves with painful lethargy towards a predictable conclusion."

Picturegoer wrote: "A struggling widow finds a wad of notes and has visions of giving her son a fine education. How the sorely tempted heroine, sympathetically played by Patricia Driscoll, gets out of this dilemma makes exciting fare."

In British Sound Films: The Studio Years 1928–1959 David Quinlan rated the film as "average", writing: "Depending on what you read, the film is either 'Drab and dispirited' or 'exciting fare'. Certainly offbeat, though, and Driscoll is sympathetic."
