= Gordon Sterne =

German actor (1923–2017)

- Born: Gerhard Paul Stern; 16 January 1923; Essen, Germany
- Died: 4 April 2017 (aged 94); Westminster, London, England
- Other names: Gordan Sterne; Gordon Stearne; Gordon Stern
- Occupation: Actor
- Years active: 1956–2009 (film & TV)

Gordon Sterne (16 January 1923 – 4 April 2017) was a German-born Canadian actor.

== Early life and education ==
Sterne was born on 16 January 1923 in Essen, Germany of Jewish descent. He left his native Nazi-dominated birth country in 1941 and became a native of Windsor, Ontario with a father who worked in the tobacco business and mother, who was supportive of his theatre aspirations. Sterne studied economics at the University of Western Ontario before volunteering for the Canadian Army in 1944, serving in the infantry as a sergeant.

Heading to New York in 1945, he trained and graduated from the Dramatic Workshop under the tutelage of its founder Erwin Piscator, at the same time as Rod Steiger, Bea Arthur, Walter Matthau, Tony Curtis and Harry Belafonte.

== Career ==
Sterne then began his acting career in America, working on radio and TV, in summer stock and off-Broadway.

After a career on stage, playing the leading man in various plays in New Jersey during the 1940s, as well as Benvenuto Cellini in The Firebrand at Washington's Arena Stage and Joseph K in The Trial at New York's Provincetown Playhouse during the early 1950s, Sterne moved to Britain in 1956 where he had over 50 years working in theatre, TV and film.

Being able to speak German (and French) enabled Sterne to perform in Drop Dead Darling on tour in Germany as well as a spell with the English Theatre in Vienna.

== Selected filmography ==
=== Film ===
- Battle of the V-1 (1958) - Margraaf
- The Great Van Robbery (1959) - Robledo
- The Child and the Killer (1959) - Sergeant
- Libel (1959) - Maddox
- Murder at Site 3 (1959) - Uncredited
- Sink the Bismarck! (1960) - German Officer (uncredited)
- The Millionairess (1960) - 2nd Secretary
- Taste of Fear (1961) - Policeman (uncredited)
- The Guns of Navarone (1961) - German Officer (uncredited)
- The Fur Collar (1962) - Duclos
- Stranglehood (1963)
- The V.I.P.s (1963) - Official (uncredited)
- From Russia with Love (1963) - SPECTRE Helicopter Pilot (uncredited)
- The Vulture (1967) - Edward Stroud
- The Assassination Bureau (1969) - Corporal (uncredited)
- The Chairman (1969) - U.S. Airforce Sergeant
- Mosquito Squadron (1969) - Resistance Leader (uncredited)
- The Adding Machine (1969) - Yard guard
- This, That and the Other (1970) - Producer
- Sex Play (1974) - Randolph O'Hara
- An American Werewolf in London (1981) - Mr. Kessler
- The Razor's Edge (1984) - Doctor
- Orion's Belt (1985) - American tourist
- Highlander (1986) - Dr. Willis Kennedy
- Fourplay (2001) - Actor in Color of My Life
- Laws of Attraction (2004) - Judge Baker

=== Television ===
- I Spy (1956) - Captain Price
- ITV Play of the Week (1956) - Lieutenant Charles / Dr. Aristides Agramonte
- Armchair Theatre (1956–1962) - Harry / Lionel / Schroder
- Sunday Night Theatre (1956–1959) - Samuel Ellis / Howie Newson / Leander Nolan / Administrator / Clark
- Escape (1956) - Colonel Goodwin, USAAF
- O.S.S. (1958) - Flight Medic
- White Hunter (1958) - Richardson
- Rendezvous (1959) - Man (uncredited)
- The Four Just Men (1959–1960) - Franconi / Dr. Wayne
- The Charlie Drake Show (1959) - Mike Slade
- No Hiding Place (1959) - Ward Mayhoff
- International Detective (1960) - The Records Officer / The Professor
- Hancock's Half Hour (1960) - Canada House Clerk
- Man from Interpol (1960) - Lebois
- Interpol Calling (1960) - Rebel Captain (uncredited)
- Garry Halliday (1960) - Viner
- One Step Beyond (1961) - Man
- Tales of Mystery (1962) - Steve Brodie
- Out of This World (1962) - Journalist
- Zero One (1962–1965) - Ziggy
- Suspense (1963) - Mr. Shenner
- The Saint (1963–1966) - Fritz Kapel / Vopos
- Maigret (1963) - Inspector Clark
- Espionage (1964) - Aide to US Ambassador
- The Plane Makers (1964) - Oberst Leutnant
- Court Martial (1966) - Captain Carey
- The Prisoner (1964) - Bystander
- Man in a Suitcase (1968) - Ernst Liebkind
- Doctor Who (1970) - Heldorf
- Crossroads (1970) - George Baxter
- UFO (1970–1971) - German Delegate / Helmsman Ellis
- Paul Temple (1970) - Hotel receptionist
- The Troubleshooters (1970) - Dan Harper / Andy Shelton
- The Protectors (1973) - Barman
- Skiboy (1974) - Brubaker
- Anne of Avonlea (1975) - Thomas Lynde
- Second Verdict (1976) - Dr. Dolan
- The New Avengers (1977) - Professor Vasil
- Panorama (1982) - Prosecutor
- American Playhouse (1982) - Louis Lefkowitz
- Reilly, Ace of Spies (1983) - Ford
- Bulman (1985) - Legal Counsellor
- John and Yoko: A Love Story (1985) - New York Critic
- Jeeves and Wooster (1992) - Diner
- Gulliver's Travels (1996) - Brobdingnag Scientist
- Kavanagh QC (1997) - Old Timer
- Little Britain (2005) - Mr. Jeffreys
- The Tudors (2007–2009) - Bishop Tunstall
