= Robert Ayres (actor) =

American actor (1914–1968)

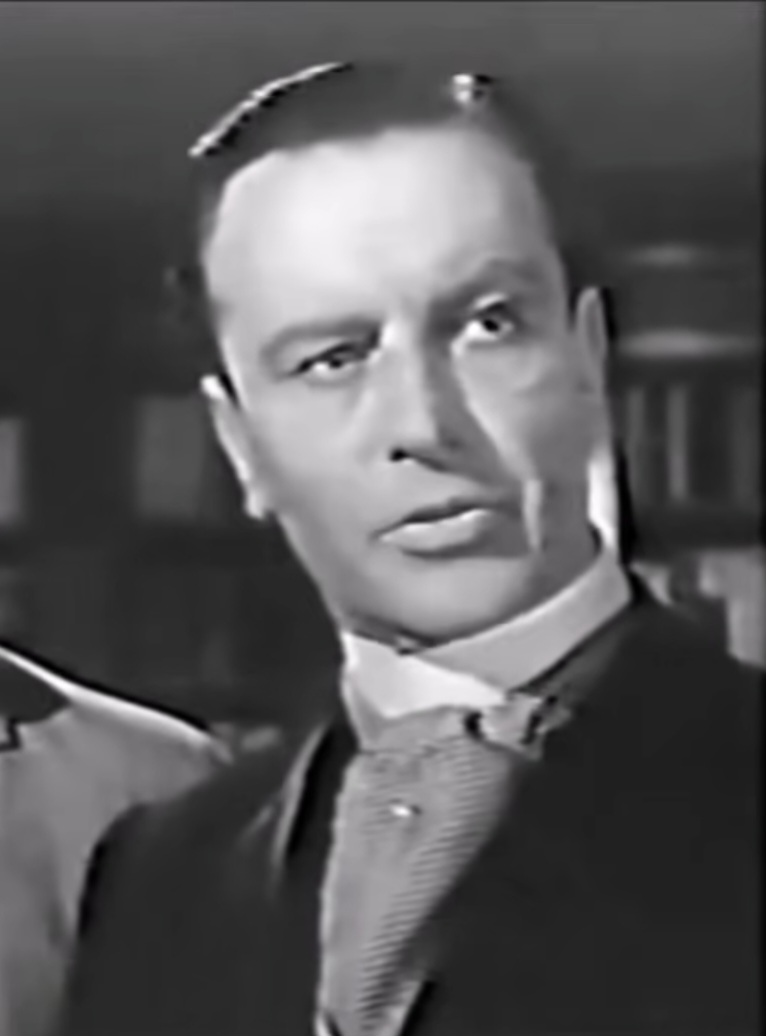
- Ayres in an episode of One Step Beyond (1961)
- Born: 11 December 1914; Michigan, US
- Died: 5 November 1968 (aged 53); Hemel Hempstead, Hertfordshire, England
- Occupation: Actor
- Years active: 1922–1968
- Spouse: Beryl Edwards

Robert Ayres (11 December 1914 – 5 November 1968) was an American film, stage and television actor. He worked mainly in Britain.

His stage work included Edward Albee's The American Dream and The Death of Bessie Smith at London's Royal Court Theatre in 1961.

== Selected filmography ==
- They Were Not Divided (1950) – American Brigadier
- State Secret (1950) – Arthur J. Buckman
- To Have and to Hold (1951) – Max
- Night Without Stars (1951) – Walter
- Black Widow (1951) – Mark Sherwin (The Amnesiac)
- 13 East Street (1952) – Larry Conn
- 24 Hours of a Woman's Life (1952) – Frank Brown
- Cosh Boy (1953) – Bob Stevens
- The Wedding of Lilli Marlene (1953) – Andrew Jackson
- River Beat (1954) – Captain Watford
- Delayed Action (1954) – Ned Ellison
- A Prize of Gold (1955) – Tex
- Contraband Spain (1955) – Mr. Dean, American Embassy superior
- It's Never Too Late (1956) – Leroy Crane
- The Baby and the Battleship (1956) – American Captain (uncredited)
- Operation Murder (1957) – Larry Winton
- The Story of Esther Costello (1957) – Mr. Wilson
- Time Lock (1957) – Insp. Andrews
- Cat Girl (1957) – Dr. Brian Marlowe
- The Depraved (1957) – Colonel-in-chief
- A Night to Remember (1958) – Maj. Arthur Peuchen
- First Man into Space (1959) – Capt. Ben Richards
- John Paul Jones (1959) – John Adams
- A Woman's Temptation (1959) – Mike
- Date at Midnight (1959) – Gordon Baines
- Transatlantic (1960) – Hotchkiss
- The Road to Hong Kong (1962) – American Official
- Two and Two Make Six (1962) – Col. Robert Thompson
- The Sicilians (1963) – Angelo Di Marco
- The Heroes of Telemark (1965) – General Courts
- Woman's Temptation (1966) – Mike
- The 25th Hour (1967)
- Battle Beneath the Earth (1967) – Adm. Felix Hillebrand
- Isadora (1968) – (uncredited) (final film role)

== Death ==
Ayres died of a heart attack, at age 53 on 5 November 1968 in Hemel Hempstead, Hertfordshire, England.
