= The Adventures of Harry Lime =

Old-time radio programme

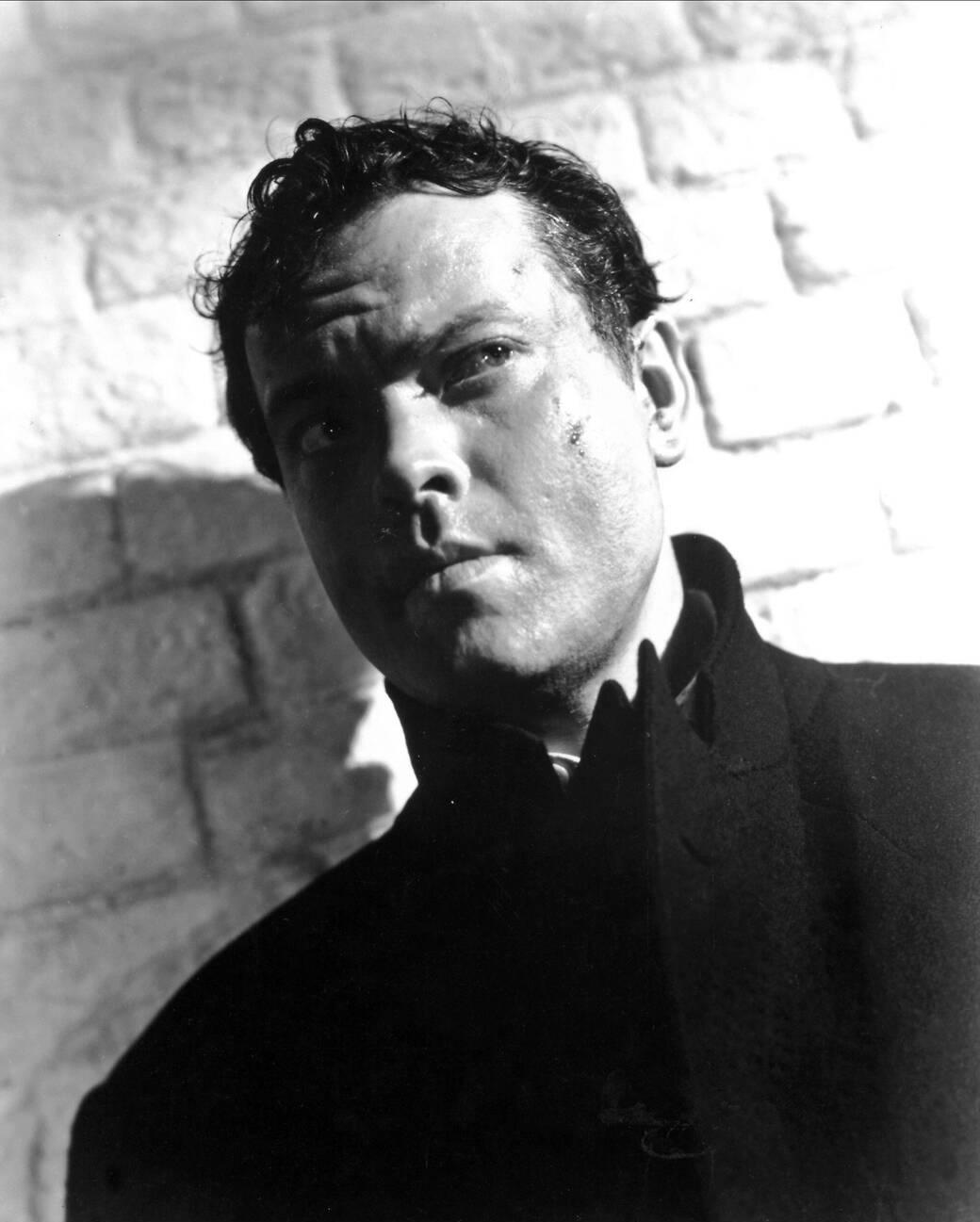
A publicity photo of Orson Welles as Harry Lime in the original film.

The Adventures of Harry Lime (broadcast in the United States as The Lives of Harry Lime) is an old-time radio programme produced in the United Kingdom during the 1951 to 1952 season. Orson Welles reprises his role of Harry Lime from the celebrated 1949 film The Third Man. The radio series is a prequel to the film, and depicts the many misadventures of con-artist Lime in a somewhat lighter tone than that of the film.

== Production ==
The Adventures of Harry Lime is one of the most successful series created by prolific British radio producer Harry Alan Towers and his company Towers of London. Towers and Graham Greene, author of The Third Man, had the same literary agent, and Towers learned that Greene had not sold the rights to the character of Harry Lime to Alexander Korda when he sold Korda The Third Man. Towers quickly bought the rights to the character and in 1951 he put a syndicated radio series into production. Orson Welles reprised the role of Harry Lime in a series of adventures that preceded the story told in The Third Man.

Several episodes would begin with "The Third Man Theme" being played, abruptly cut off by an echoing gunshot. Then Welles would speak: "That was the shot that killed Harry Lime. He died in a sewer beneath Vienna, as those of you know who saw the movie The Third Man. Yes, that was the end of Harry Lime ... but it was not the beginning. Harry Lime had many lives ... and I can recount all of them. How do I know? Very simple. Because my name is Harry Lime."

Although often cited as a BBC production, the series was one of a number produced and distributed independently by Towers of London and syndicated internationally.

== Episodes ==
Only sixteen of the episodes were acquired and broadcast by the BBC in the UK. It was the first time that the BBC broadcast episodes of a dramatic series that it did not produce. The full series was syndicated to radio stations in the U.S.

Original air date	#	Episode title
3 August 1951	1	"Too Many Crooks"
10 August 1951	2	"See Naples and Live"
17 August 1951	3	"Clay Pigeon"
24 August 1951	4	"A Ticket to Tangiers"
31 August 1951	5	"Voodoo"
7 September 1951	6	"The Bohemian Star"
14 September 1951	7	"Love Affair"
21 September 1951	8	"Rogue's Holiday"
28 September 1951	9	"Work of Art"
5 October 1951	10	"Operation Music Box"
12 October 1951	11	"Golden Fleece"
19 October 1951	12	"Blue Bride"
26 October 1951	13	"Every Frame Has a Silver Lining"
2 November 1951	14	"Mexican Hat Trick"
9 November 1951	15	"Art Is Long and Lime Is Fleeting"
16 November 1951	16	"In Pursuit of a Ghost" (aka "El Zorro")
23 November 1951	17	"Horse Play" (aka "The Racetrack")
30 November 1951	18	"Three Farthings for Your Thoughts"
7 December 1951	19	"The Third Woman"
14 December 1951	20	"An Old Moorish Custom"
21 December 1951	21	"It's a Knockout"
28 December 1951	22	"Two Is Company"
4 January 1952	23	"Cherchez La Gem"
11 January 1952	24	"Hands of Glory"
18 January 1952	25	"Double Double Trouble" (aka "The Double Double Cross")
25 January 1952	26	"Five Thousand Pengoes and a Kiss"
1 February 1952	27	"Dark Enchantress"
8 February 1952	28	"Earl on Troubled Waters"
15 February 1952	29	"The Dead Candidate"
22 February 1952	30	"It's in the Bag"
29 February 1952	31	"Hyacinth Patrol"
7 March 1952	32	"Turnabout is Foul Play"
14 March 1952	33	"Violets, Sweet Violets"
21 March 1952	34	"Faith, Lime and Charity"
28 March 1952	35	"Pleasure Before Business"
4 April 1952	36	"Fool's Gold"
11 April 1952	37	"Man of Mystery"
18 April 1952	38	"The Painted Smile"
25 April 1952	39	"Harry Lime Joins The Circus"
2 May 1952	40	"Suzie's Cue"
9 May 1952	41	"Viva La Chance"
16 May 1952	42	"The Elusive Vermeer"
23 May 1952	43	"Murder on the Riviera"
30 May 1952	44	"Pearls of Bohemia"
6 June 1952	45	"A Night in a Harem"
13 June 1952	46	"Blackmail Is a Nasty Word"
20 June 1952	47	"The Professor Regrets"
27 June 1952	48	"The Hard Way"
4 July 1952	49	"Paris Is Not the Same"
11 July 1952	50	"Honeymoon"
18 July 1952	51	"The Blue Caribou"
25 July 1952	52	"Greek Meets Greek"

The con orchestrated by Welles' character in the episode "Horse Play" closely resembles that of the 1973 Robert Redford and Paul Newman film "The Sting." Both are based on the book "The Big Con" written by David W. Maurer which was published in 1940.

The episode "Man of Mystery," written by Welles, was later expanded by him and served as the basic plot for his film Mr. Arkadin. "Murder on the Riviera" and "Blackmail Is a Nasty Word" also contain plot elements later used in that film.

A recording of the 1951 "A Ticket to Tangiers" episode of The Lives of Harry Lime series is available on the Criterion Collection DVD edition of The Third Man. In addition, recordings of the 1952 episodes "Man of Mystery," "Murder on the Riviera," and "Blackmail Is a Nasty Word" are included on the Criterion Collection DVD The Complete Mr. Arkadin.

== Novelisation ==
=== The Lives of Harry Lime ===
Fifteen episodes were adapted into a short story collection, The Lives of Harry Lime, published in the United Kingdom by Pocket Books in 1952. The book was credited to "Orson Welles and others", and Welles had been credited with writing the scripts of several episodes, but it is unclear whether or not he wrote the adaptations.

Additionally, Harry Alan Towers has cast doubt on whether Welles even wrote the episodes he was credited with. He describes how the series started being written by a team of experienced American radio scriptwriters. When Welles discovered they were being paid $1,000 per script, he offered to write 6 scripts himself. The scripts were delivered and Towers duly paid Welles $6,000. Then one day, a man walked into Towers' office, demanding to be paid for the scripts which he had ghostwritten for Welles. When Welles was asked about it later, he smiled: "Don't pay him. They weren't very good scripts."

The episodes which were adapted into short stories were:

1. It's in the Bag by Orson Welles (Episode 30)
2. The Golden Fleece by Orson Welles (Episode 11)
3. Art is Long and Lime is Fleeting by Sigmund Miller (Episode 15)
4. Love Affair by Sigmund Miller (Episode 7)
5. See Naples and Live by Sigmund Miller (Episode 2)
6. Every Frame Has a Silver Lining by Robert Cenedella (Episode 13)
7. Paris is Not the Same by Joseph Cochran (Episode 49)
8. Five Thousand Pengoes and a Kiss by Carl Jampel (Episode 26)
9. The Hand of Glory by Jonquil Anthony (Episode 24)
10. The Hyacinth Patrol by Virginia Cooke (Episode 31)
11. Horseplay by Peter Lyon (Episode 17)
12. Work of Art by Bud Lesser (Episode 9)
13. Rogue's Holiday by Peter Lyon (Episode 8)
14. A Ticket to Tangier [sic] by Orson Welles (Episode 4)
15. An Old Moorish Custom by Irvan Ashkinazy (Episode 20)

=== Une Grosse Légume ===
Welles also tried to convert one episode script into a film script for producer Alexander Korda. When that fell through, the story was adapted into a novel and published in France as Une Grosse Légume in 1953. The novel was ghostwritten by Maurice Bessy and published under Welles's name. It has never been published in English.

In 2018, author Matthew Asprey Gear discovered an English-language typescript of the novel in Turin. The typescript was bound and credited to Welles. It will be published in English in 2027.

== Listen to ==
- Archive.org: The Lives of Harry Lime (52 episodes)

== See also ==
- Orson Welles radio credits
