= Olof Aschberg =

Swedish banker

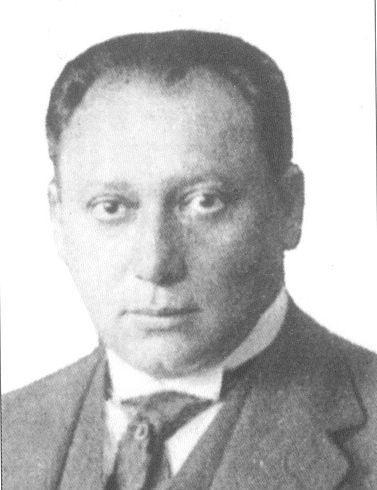
- Olof Aschberg
- Born: July 22, 1877; Stockholm, Sweden
- Died: April 21, 1960 (aged 82); Menton, France
- Resting place: Norra Begravningsplatsen
- Relatives: Robert Aschberg (grandson); Richard Aschberg (grandson); Sissi Kaiser (niece)

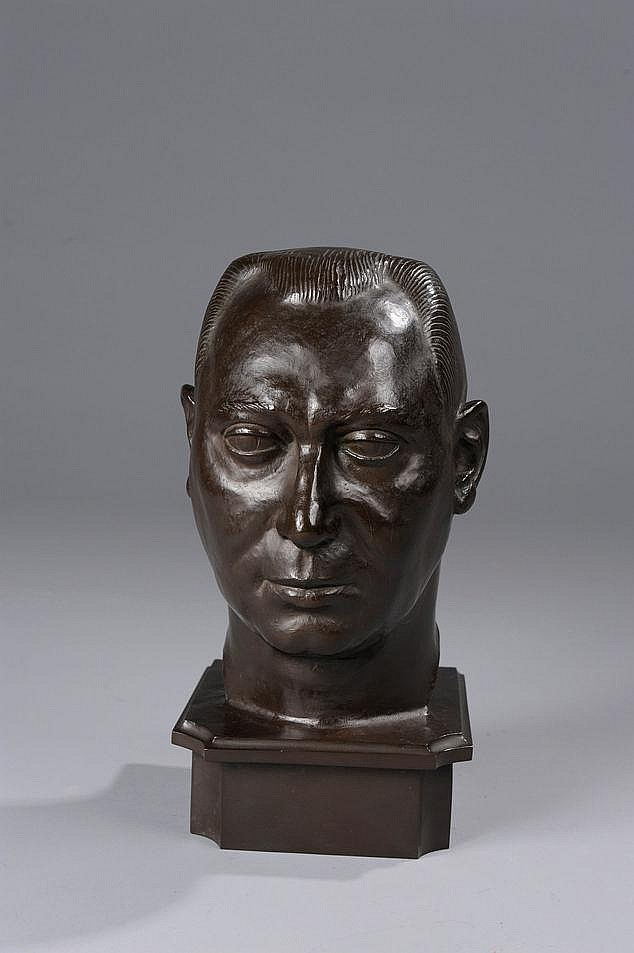
Bank director Olof Aschberg, brown patronized bronze bust created by Carl Fagerberg in 1925.

Olof Aschberg (July 22, 1877 – April 21, 1960) was a Swedish banker of Russian-Jewish descent who served as head of the Stockholm bank Nya Banken, the first bank in Sweden for trade unions and cooperatives. From August 18, 1922 on he served as Director-General of Roscombank, which was later transformed into Vnesheconombank.

Aschberg was a leftist sympathizer and helped finance the Bolsheviks during the Russian Revolution. In gratitude, the Bolshevik government allowed Aschberg to do business with the Soviet Union during the 1920s (as was consistent with the New Economic Policy). His co-directors included prominent Swedish cooperatives and Swedish socialists, including G. W. Dahl, K. G. Rosling, and C. Gerhard Magnusson.

== Early years ==
In Stockholm, Aschberg founded the first Swedish bank for trade unions and cooperatives (Nya Banken) in 1912 and became a friend of Hjalmar Branting. When financial operations in favor of the Germans in 1918 caused him trouble with the Allies of World War I, the bank was renamed Svensk Ekonomiebolaget. He was already a successful banker and businessman when he met first Willi Münzenberg who visited the Stockholm Youth Socialist Congress of 1917. Later, during the Bolsheviks aspirations to rebuild the Russian economy, it was Münzenberg's task to expand their modest pool of capital by floating so-called "workers' loans" using his Workers International Relief organization. By means of this subterfuge the money used for buying machines and goods in the West looked like being the outcome of proletarian support, in reality it came directly from the Kremlin, confiscated from Russia's rich and the Church.

Established in Berlin in the 1920s, Aschberg's Garantie- und Kreditbank für den Osten was charged with repayment of the WIR workers' loans, although he had not been very fond of it from its very beginning on and had even contributed to abolish it soon after its launch. Aschberg had already gained the Soviet leaders' favor, by being one of the main connections in the early years after 1917 in evading the international boycott on gold robbed by the Bolsheviks, which he offered on the Stockholm market after having the bullions melted down and given new markings. At the end of the 1920s Aschberg moved to France, where he bought Château du Bois du Rocher at Jouy-en-Josas (in 1950 offered to UNESCO and subsequently sold to the Yvelines department).

In a U.S. State Department file a Green Cipher message from the U.S. embassy in Christiania (renamed Oslo in 1925), Norway, dated February 21, 1918, it reads: "Am informed that Bolshevik funds are deposited in Nya Banken, Stockholm, Legation Stockholm advised. Schmedeman".

== Spanish Civil War ==
He helped finance the Popular Front during the Spanish Civil War. Again Münzenberg was often invited to Aschberg's Paris townhouse on the place Casimir-Périer and received the funds for launching Die Zukunft (The Future), a weekly political broadsheet. The Left Bank townhouse was gradually transformed into a kind of all-purpose Münzenberg salon, attracting the attention of the Gestapo, which spied on the meetings taking place there. With the outbreak of World War II Aschberg was interned in Camp Vernet by the French authorities. Due to his Jewish background, he was endangered when France was invaded by Nazi Germany in 1940 and fled with his family to the United States in January 1941 via Lisbon when the Vichy government set him free. Upon arrival, Aschberg immediately started to support the Free World Association. After the war, Aschberg moved back to Sweden. In 1946 he started publishing his memoirs in three volumes (En vandrande jude från Glasbruksgatan, Återkomsten, and Gästboken) and he invited Margarete Buber-Neumann to write Under Two Dictators: Prisoner of Stalin and Hitler.

== Charity ==
He built up a collection of Russian icons containing 245 pieces which he donated to the Swedish Nationalmuseum in Stockholm in 1933. This largest and finest collection of icons outside Russia was supplemented in 1952 and put the Nationalmuseum among the leading museums in this field.

== Family ==
Olof is the grandfather of the journalists Robert Aschberg and Richard Aschberg.
