= The Third Man =

1949 film by Carol Reed

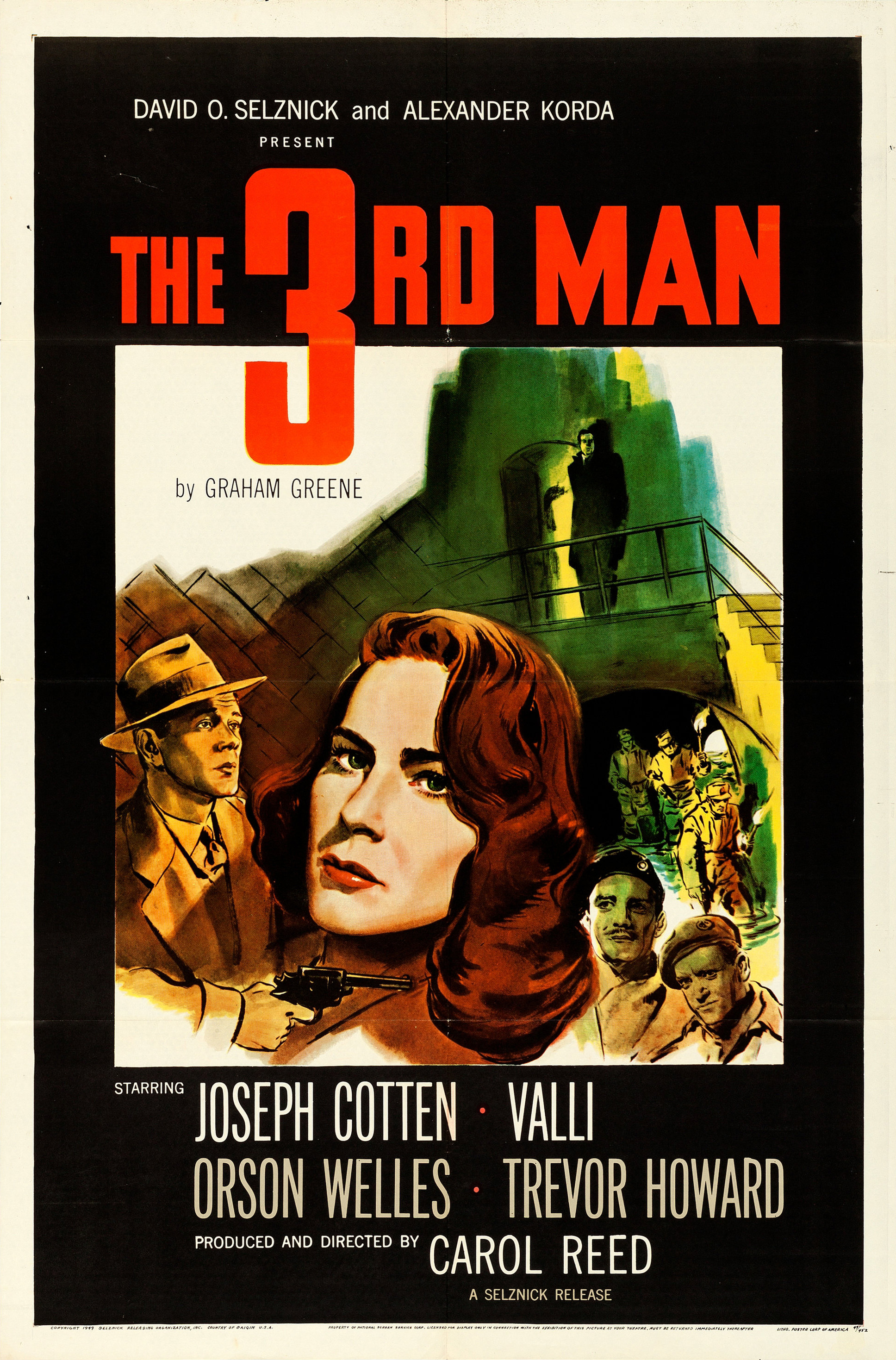
- US theatrical release poster
- Directed by: Carol Reed
- Screenplay by: Graham Greene; Alexander Korda; Carol Reed; Orson Welles
- Produced by: Carol Reed; Alexander Korda; David O. Selznick
- Starring: Joseph Cotten; Alida Valli; Orson Welles; Bernard Lee; Trevor Howard
- Cinematography: Robert Krasker
- Edited by: Oswald Hafenrichter
- Music by: Anton Karas
- Production company: London Films
- Distributed by: British Lion Film Corporation (UK); Selznick Releasing Organization (US)
- Release dates: 1 September 1949 (UK); 2 February 1950 (US)
- Running time: 104 minutes
- Countries: United Kingdom; United States
- Languages: English; German
- Box office: £277,549 (UK) (equivalent to £8,480,000 in 2025)

The Third Man is a 1949 film noir directed by Carol Reed, written by Graham Greene, and starring Joseph Cotten, Alida Valli, Orson Welles and Trevor Howard. Set in post-World War II Allied-occupied Vienna, the film centres on American writer Holly Martins (Cotten), who arrives in the city to accept a job with his friend Harry Lime (Welles), only to learn that he has died. Martins stays in Vienna to investigate Lime's death, becoming infatuated with Lime's girlfriend Anna Schmidt (Valli).

The use of black-and-white German expressionist-influenced cinematography by Robert Krasker, with its harsh lighting and Dutch angles, is a major feature of The Third Man. Combined with the use of ruined locations in Vienna, the style evokes exhaustion and cynicism at the start of the Cold War.

Greene wrote a novella as a treatment for the screenplay. Composer Anton Karas' title composition "The Third Man Theme" aka "Harry Lime Theme", topped the international music charts in 1950, bringing international fame to the previously unknown performer. The Third Man is considered one of the greatest films of all time, celebrated for its acting, musical score, and atmospheric cinematography.

In 1999, the British Film Institute voted The Third Man the greatest British film of all time. In 2011, a poll for Time Out ranked it the second-best British film ever.

== Plot ==
Holly Martins, an American author of Western pulp novels, arrives in the British sector of Allied-occupied Vienna seeking Harry Lime, a childhood friend who has offered him a job. However, Martins is told that Lime was killed by a car while crossing the street. At Lime's funeral, Martins meets two Field Security Section men, part of the ICPO: Sergeant Paine, a fan of Martins' novels, and Major Calloway. Afterward, Martins is asked to lecture at a book club a few days later. He then meets a friend of Lime's, "Baron" Kurtz, who tells Martins that he and another friend, Popescu, carried Lime to the side of the street after the accident, and that, before he died, Lime asked them to take care of Martins and Lime's girlfriend, actress Anna Schmidt.

As Martins and Anna query Lime's death, they realise that accounts differ as to whether Lime was able to speak before his death, and how many men carried away the body. The porter at Lime's apartment tells them that he saw a third man helping. He offers to give Martins more information but is murdered before they can speak again; Martins and Anna flee the scene after a mob begins to suspect him of the murder. When Martins confronts Major Calloway and demands that Lime's death be investigated, Calloway reveals that Lime was stealing penicillin from military hospitals, diluting it, and then selling it on the black market, injuring or killing countless people. Martins agrees to drop his investigation and leave.

An inebriated Martins visits Anna and confesses his feelings for her. A man crosses the street towards her front door, but moves away after seeing Martins at the window. After leaving, Martins walks the streets until he notices Anna's cat and realises someone is watching from a darkened doorway. In a momentary flash of light, Martins sees that the man is Lime. Martins calls out, but Lime flees and vanishes. Martins summons Calloway, who realises that Lime has escaped through the city's sewers to the Soviet sector. The British police exhume Lime's coffin and discover that the body is that of a hospital orderly who had been assisting him. Anna, who is Czech, is to be sent to the Soviet sector after the British police discover that she has a forged Austrian passport, and is questioned again by Calloway.

Martins goes to Kurtz and asks to see Lime. Lime and Martins meet and talk as they ride the Wiener Riesenrad. Lime speaks cynically of the insignificance of his victims' lives and the personal gains to be earned from the city's chaos and deprivation. Martins realises that Lime sold Anna out to the Soviet authorities for his own benefit. Lime obliquely threatens Martins as he is now the only 'proof' that Lime is alive, however Martins retorts that the authorities are aware of the false burial. Lime then offers Martins a chance to join in on his scheme before leaving quickly. Calloway asks Martins to help arrest Lime; he agrees provided that Calloway will arrange for Anna to leave Vienna rather than be handed over to the Soviets. The British authorities arrange for Anna to take a train to Paris, but she spots Martins, who has come to observe her departure, at the station. After persuading Martins to reveal the plan to capture Lime, she leaves in order to warn him. Exasperated, Martins decides to leave Vienna; on the way to the airport, Calloway stops at a hospital to show Martins children dying of meningitis who were treated with Lime's diluted penicillin, which convinces him to stay and assist in capturing Lime.

Lime arrives at a café in the international zone to meet Martins, but Anna is able to warn him that the police are closing in. He flees into the sewer, with the police following him underground. Lime shoots and kills Sgt Paine, but Calloway shoots and badly wounds Lime. Lime drags himself up a cast-iron stairway to a street grating but cannot lift it. Martins, armed with Paine's gun, runs after Lime finding him beneath the grating where they stare at each other. Calloway, realising Martins has chased Lime, shouts that Martins must not take any chances and shoot on sight. Lime nods his head slightly at Martins. Calloway follows down the tunnel as a single shot is heard.

Martins attends Lime's second funeral at the risk of missing his flight out of Vienna. He waits on the road to the cemetery to speak with Anna, but she walks past without glancing in his direction.

== Cast ==
- Joseph Cotten as Holly Martins
- Alida Valli (credited as 'Valli') as Anna Schmidt
- Orson Welles as Harry Lime
- Trevor Howard as Major Calloway
- Paul Hörbiger as Karl, Lime's porter
- Ernst Deutsch as "Baron" Kurtz
- Erich Ponto as Dr Winkel
- Siegfried Breuer as Popescu
- Hedwig Bleibtreu as Anna's landlady
- Bernard Lee as Sergeant Paine
- Wilfrid Hyde-White as Crabbin

Uncredited

- Alexis Chesnakov as Brodsky, Russian official
- Herbert Halbik as Hansel, the boy with a ball
- Leo Bieber as Casanova, barman
- Robert Brown and Geoffrey Keen as British MPs
- Reed De Rouen as American MP
- Paul Hardtmuth as Hotel Sacher porter
- Annie Rosar as porter's wife
- Eric Pohlmann as Smolka's waiter
- Brother Theodore as man on street
- Nelly Arno as Kurtz's mother
- Karel Štěpánek as Josefstadt Theatre actor
- Joseph Cotten as the narrator (pre-1999 US version)
- Carol Reed as the narrator (pre-1999 UK, and all post-'99 versions)

== Production ==
Before writing the screenplay, Graham Greene worked out the atmosphere, characterisation, and mood of the story by writing a novella as a film treatment. He never intended for it to be read by the general public, although it was later published under the same name as the film. The novella is narrated in the first person from Calloway's perspective. In 1948, Greene met Elizabeth Montagu in Vienna; she gave him tours of the city, its sewers, and some of its less reputable nightclubs. She also introduced Greene to Peter Smolka, the central European correspondent for The Times, who gave Greene stories about the black market in Vienna.

During the shooting of the film, the final scene was the subject of a dispute between producer David O. Selznick and Reed. While Selznick preferred the hopeful ending of the novella, with Martins and Anna walking away arm-in-arm, Reed refused to end the film on what he felt was an artificially happy note. Greene later wrote: "One of the very few major disputes between Carol Reed and myself concerned the ending, and he has been proved triumphantly right." Selznick's contribution, according to himself, was mainly enlisting Cotten and Welles and producing the shortened US version.

Through the years there was occasional speculation that Welles was the de facto director of The Third Man rather than Reed. Jonathan Rosenbaum's 2007 book Discovering Orson Welles calls this a "popular misconception", although Rosenbaum did note that the film "began to echo the Wellesian theme of betrayed male friendship and certain related ideas from Citizen Kane." Rosenbaum writes that Welles "didn't direct anything in the picture; the basics of his shooting and editing style, its music and meaning, are plainly absent. Yet old myths die hard, and some viewers persist in believing otherwise." Welles himself fuelled this theory in a 1958 interview, in which he said he "entirely wrote the role" of the Harry Lime character and that he'd had an unspecified role in making the film—more than the contribution he made to Journey into Fear—but that it was a "delicate matter" he did not want to discuss because he wasn't the film's producer. However, in a 1967 interview with Peter Bogdanovich, Welles said that his involvement was minimal: "It was Carol's picture". Welles did contribute some of the film's best-known dialogue. Bogdanovich also stated in the introduction to the DVD:

However, I think it's important to note that the look of The Third Man—and, in fact, the whole film—would be unthinkable without Citizen Kane, The Stranger and The Lady from Shanghai, all of which Orson made in the '40s, and all of which preceded The Third Man. Carol Reed, I think, was definitely influenced by Orson Welles, the director, from the films he had made.

=== Principal photography ===
Six weeks of principal photography were shot on location in Vienna, ending on 11 December 1948. Some use was made of the Sievering Studios facilities in the city. Production then moved to Worton Hall Studios in Isleworth and Shepperton Studios in Surrey and was completed in March 1949. Thomas Riegler emphasises the opportunities for Cold War espionage that the Vienna locations made available, and notes that "the audio engineer Jack Davies noticed at least one mysterious person on the set."

The scenes of Harry Lime in the sewer were shot on location or on sets built at Shepperton; most of the location shots used doubles for Welles. However, Reed claimed that, despite initial reluctance, Welles quickly became enthusiastic and stayed in Vienna to finish the film.

According to the 2015 recollection of assistant director Guy Hamilton, Greene and Reed worked very well together but Welles "generally annoyed everyone on the set". His temporary absence forced Hamilton to step in as a body double, and the filming of the sewer scenes was moved to studios in the UK as a result of Welles' complaints about shooting in the actual sewers.

Reed had four different camera units shooting around Vienna for the duration of the production. He worked around the clock, using Benzedrine to stay awake.

=== "Cuckoo clock" speech ===
In a famous scene, Lime meets Martins on the Wiener Riesenrad in the Prater amusement park. Looking down on the people below from his vantage point, Lime compares them to dots, and says that it would be insignificant if one of them or a few of them "stopped moving, forever". Back on the ground, he notes:

You know what the fellow said—in Italy, for 30 years under the Borgias, they had warfare, terror, murder and bloodshed; but they produced Michelangelo, Leonardo da Vinci and the Renaissance. In Switzerland, they had brotherly love; they had 500 years of democracy and peace—and what did that produce? The cuckoo clock!

According to scriptwriter Graham Greene, "the popular line of dialogue concerning Swiss cuckoo clocks was written into the script by Mr Welles himself" (in the published script, it is in a footnote). Greene wrote in a letter that "What happened was that during the shooting of The Third Man it was found necessary for the timing to insert another sentence." Welles apparently said the lines came from "an old Hungarian play"—in any event the idea is not original to Welles, as acknowledged by the phrase "what the fellow said". The likeliest source is the painter James Abbott McNeill Whistler; in an 1885 lecture published in Mr Whistler's "Ten O'Clock" in 1888, he said that "The Swiss in their mountains ... What more worthy people! ... yet, the perverse and scornful [goddess, Art] will have none of it, and the sons of patriots are left with the clock that turns the mill, and the sudden cuckoo, with difficulty restrained in its box! For this was Tell a hero! For this did Gessler die!" In a 1916 reminiscence, American painter Theodore Wores said that he "tried to get an acknowledgment from Whistler that San Francisco would some day become a great art center on account of our climatic, scenic and other advantages. 'But environment does not lead to a production of art,' Whistler retorted. 'Consider Switzerland. There the people have everything in the form of natural advantages—mountains, valleys and blue sky. And what have they produced? The cuckoo clock!"

This Is Orson Welles (1993) quotes Welles: "When the picture came out, the Swiss very nicely pointed out to me that they've never made any cuckoo clocks", as cuckoo clocks were actually invented in the German Black Forest (however, it is not true that the Swiss have never made any cuckoo clocks: they contributed a whole subtype, the chalet style). Writer John McPhee pointed out that when the Borgias flourished in Italy, Switzerland had "the most powerful and feared military force in Europe" and was not the neutral country it later became.

=== Music ===
What sort of music it is, whether jaunty or sad, fierce or provoking, it would be hard to reckon; but under its enthrallment, the camera comes into play ... The unseen zither-player ... is made to employ his instrument much as the Homeric bard did his lyre.

— William Whitebait, New Statesman and Nation (1949)

Zither player Anton Karas composed and performed the film's score. Before the production came to Vienna, Karas was an unknown performer in local Heurigers. According to Time: "The picture demanded music appropriate to post-World War II Vienna, but director Reed had made up his mind to avoid schmaltzy, heavily orchestrated waltzes. In Vienna one night Reed listened to a wine-garden zitherist named Anton Karas, [and] was fascinated by the jangling melancholy of his music."

According to Guy Hamilton, Reed met Karas by coincidence at a party in Vienna, where he was playing the zither. Reed brought Karas to London, where the musician worked with Reed on the score for six weeks. Karas stayed at Reed's house during that time. The American film critic Roger Ebert later asked: "Has there ever been a film where the music more perfectly suited the action than in Carol Reed's The Third Man?"

Additional music for the film was written by the Australian-born composer Hubert Clifford under the pseudonym of Michael Sarsfield. From 1944 until 1950 Clifford was Musical Director for Korda at London Film Productions, where he chose the composers and conducted the scores for films, as well as composing many original scores of his own. An extract from his Third Man music, The Casanova Melody, was orchestrated by Rodney Newton in 2000.

=== Differences between releases ===
As the original British release begins, the voice of director Carol Reed (uncredited) describes post-war Vienna from a racketeer's point of view. The version shown in American cinemas cut eleven minutes of footage and replaced Reed's voice-over with narration by Cotten as Holly Martins. Selznick instituted the replacement narration because he did not think American audiences would relate to the seedy tone of the original. Today, Reed's original version appears on American DVDs, in showings on Turner Classic Movies, and in U.S. cinema releases with the eleven minutes of footage restored, including a shot of a near-topless dancer that would have violated the Hays Code. Both the Criterion Collection and StudioCanal DVD releases of the film include both opening monologues.

A restored version of the film was released in the United Kingdom on 26 June 2015.

In September 2024, StudioCanal released a 4K restoration of the film to celebrate its 75th anniversary. It had a short run in UK cinemas and was later released on 4K Blu-ray.

== Reception ==
The Grand Gala World Premiere of the film was held at the Ritz Cinema in Hastings on 1 September 1949.

=== Box office ===
The Third Man was the most popular film at the British box office in 1949.

=== Critical response ===
In Austria, "local critics were underwhelmed", and the film ran for only a few weeks. The Viennese Arbeiter-Zeitung, although critical of a "not-too-logical plot", praised the film's "masterful" depiction of a "time out of joint" and the city's atmosphere of "insecurity, poverty and post-war immorality". William Cook, after his 2006 visit to Vienna's Third Man Museum, wrote: "In Britain it's a thriller about friendship and betrayal. In Vienna it's a tragedy about Austria's troubled relationship with its past."

Some critics at the time criticised the film's Dutch angles. C. A. Lejeune in The Observer described Reed's "habit of printing his scenes askew, with floors sloping at a diagonal and close-ups deliriously tilted" as "most distracting". Reed's friend William Wyler sent him a spirit level with a note stating: "Carol, next time you make a picture, just put it on top of the camera, will you?"

Upon its release in Britain and America, the film received overwhelmingly positive reviews. Time wrote that the film was "crammed with cinematic plums that would do the early Hitchcock proud—ingenious twists and turns of plot, subtle detail, full-bodied bit characters, atmospheric backgrounds that become an intrinsic part of the story, a deft commingling of the sinister with the ludicrous, the casual with the bizarre."

The New York Times movie critic Bosley Crowther gave the film a mixed review, stating that the film:

... for all the awesome hoopla it has received, is essentially a first-rate contrivance in the way of melodrama—and that's all. ... It doesn't present any 'message.' It hasn't a point of view. It is just a bang-up melodrama, designed to excite and entertain.

Nonetheless he also described it as "an extraordinarily fascinating picture" and that:

[Reed] brilliantly packaged the whole bag of his cinematic tricks, his whole range of inventive genius for making the camera expound. His eminent gifts for compressing a wealth of suggestion in single shots, for building up agonized tension and popping surprises are fully exercised. His devilishly mischievous humor also runs lightly through the film, touching the darker depressions with little glints of the gay or macabre.

A rare negative review came from the British communist newspaper Daily Worker, which complained that "no effort is spared to make the Soviet authorities as sinister and unsympathetic as possible."

In a 1997 book, Roger Ebert praised the film and wrote: "It was a rainy day in Paris in 1962, and I was visiting Europe for the first time. A little cinema on the Left Bank was showing The Third Man, and I went, into the humid cave of Gauloise smoke and perspiration, and saw the movie for the first time. When Welles made his entrance, I was lost to the movies." He added it to his canon of "Great Movies" and wrote, "Of all the movies that I have seen, this one most completely embodies the romance of going to the movies." In a 1994 episode of Siskel & Ebert, Ebert named Lime as his favourite film villain. Gene Siskel remarked that The Third Man was an "exemplary piece of moviemaking, highlighting the ruins of World War II and juxtaposing it with the characters' own damaged histories".

The film has a 99% rating on Rotten Tomatoes based on 96 reviews, with an average rating of 9.3/10 and the following consensus: "This atmospheric thriller is one of the undisputed masterpieces of cinema, and boasts iconic performances from Joseph Cotten and Orson Welles." Metacritic, which uses a weighted average, assigned the film a score of 97 out of 100, based on 30 critics, indicating "universal acclaim".

Akira Kurosawa cited The Third Man as one of his 100 favourite films.

Pauline Kael for The New Yorker later said that the film had an atmosphere of "baroque glamour and evil."

== Soundtrack release ==
"The Third Man Theme" was released as a single in 1949/1950 (Decca in the UK, London Records in the US). It became a best-seller. By November 1949, 300,000 records had been sold in Britain, and the teen-aged Princess Margaret was reportedly a fan. Following its release in the US in 1950, "The Third Man Theme" spent 11 weeks at number one on Billboard's Best Sellers in Stores chart, from 29 April to 8 July. The exposure made Anton Karas an international star; the trailer for the film stated that "the famous musical score by Anton Karas" would have the audience "in a dither with his zither".

== Awards and honours ==
Award	Category	Nominee(s)	Result
Academy Awards	Best Director	Carol Reed	Nominated
Academy Awards	Best Cinematography – Black and White	Robert Krasker	Won
Academy Awards	Best Film Editing	Oswald Hafenrichter	Nominated
British Academy Film Awards	Best Film	Carol Reed	Nominated
British Academy Film Awards	Best British Film	Carol Reed	Won
Cannes Film Festival	Palme d'Or	Carol Reed	Won
Directors Guild of America Awards	Outstanding Directorial Achievement in Motion Pictures	Carol Reed	Nominated
National Board of Review Awards	Top Ten Foreign Films		3rd Place

Besides its top ranking in the BFI Top 100 British films list, in 2004 the magazine Total Film ranked it the fourth-greatest British film of all time. In 2005, viewers of BBC Television's Newsnight Review voted the film their fourth favourite of all time, the only film in the top five made before 1970.

The film also placed 57th on the American Film Institute's list of top American films in 1998, though the film's only American connections were Selznick, Welles, and Cotten. In June 2008, the AFI's 10 Top 10 series of lists ranked it as the fifth-best American mystery film. The film also placed 75th on AFI's list of 100 Years...100 Thrills, and Harry Lime was listed as the 37th-greatest villain in 100 Heroes and Villains.

It has also consistently been listed on the Sight and Sound Poll of the Greatest Films of All Time, conducted every decade. In 1982 it was 14th, 42nd in 1992, 32nd in 2002, 73rd in 2012 and 63rd in the latest poll in 2022. In 2006, Writers Guild of America West ranked its screenplay 33rd in WGA's list of 101 Greatest Screenplays.

== Copyright status ==
In the United Kingdom, films of this vintage are copyright protected as dramatic works until 70 years after the end of the year in which that last "principal author" died. The principal authors are generally the writer/s, director/s or composer/s of original work, and since in the case of The Third Man Graham Greene died in 1991, the film is protected until the end of 2061.

The film lapsed into public domain in the United States when the copyright was not renewed after Selznick's death. In 1996, the Uruguay Round Agreements Act restored the film's U.S. copyright protection to StudioCanal Image UK Ltd. The Criterion Collection released a digitally restored DVD of the original British print of the film. In 2008, Criterion released a Blu-ray edition, and in September 2010, Lionsgate reissued the film on Blu-ray.

On 18 January 2012, the Supreme Court of the United States ruled in Golan v. Holder that the copyright clause of the United States Constitution does not prevent the U.S. from meeting its treaty obligations towards copyright protection for foreign works. Following the ruling, films such as The Third Man and The 39 Steps were taken back out of the public domain and became fully copyrighted in the United States. Under current U.S. copyright law, The Third Man will remain copyrighted until 1 January 2045.

== Adaptations ==
Cotten reprised his role as Holly Martins in a one-hour Theatre Guild on the Air radio adaptation on 7 January 1951. It was also adapted as a one-hour radio play on two broadcasts of Lux Radio Theatre: on 9 April 1951 with Joseph Cotten again reprising his role and on 8 February 1954 with Ray Milland as Martins.

On 26 December 1950, the BBC Home Service broadcast a radio adaptation by Desmond Carrington, using the actual soundtrack of the film with linking narration performed by Wilfred Thomas.

On 13 November 1971, as part of the Saturday Night Theatre, BBC Radio 4 broadcast an adaptation from the screenplay by Richard Wortley, with Ed Bishop as Holly Martins, Ian Hendry as Harry Lime, Ann Lynn as Anna and John Bentley as Col. Calloway,

In November 1994, a new dramatisation directed by Robert Robinson was performed and recorded by the L.A. Theatre Works in front of a live audience at the Guest Quarter Suite Hotel in Santa Monica, California. The cast included Kelsey Grammer as Holly Martins, Rosalind Ayres as Anna Schmidt, John Vickery as Harry Lime and John Mahoney as Major Calloway.

== Spin-offs ==
The British radio series The Adventures of Harry Lime (broadcast in the US as The Lives of Harry Lime) created as a prequel to the film, centres on Lime's adventures prior to the film, and Welles reprises his role as a somewhat less nefarious adventurer anti-hero than the sociopathic opportunist depicted in the film's incarnation. Fifty-two episodes aired in 1951 and 1952, several of which Welles wrote, including "Ticket to Tangiers", which is included on the Criterion Collection and StudioCanal releases of The Third Man. Recordings of the 1952 episodes "Man of Mystery", "Murder on the Riviera", and "Blackmail Is a Nasty Word" are included on the Criterion Collection DVD The Complete Mr. Arkadin.

Harry Lime appeared in two comic book stories in the fourth issue of Super Detective Library: "The Secret of the Circus" and "Too Many Crooks".

A television spin-off starring Michael Rennie as Harry Lime ran for five seasons from 1959 to 1965. Seventy-seven episodes were filmed; directors included Paul Henreid (10 episodes) and Arthur Hiller (six episodes). Jonathan Harris played sidekick Bradford Webster for 72 episodes, and Roger Moore guest-starred in the instalment "The Angry Young Man", which Hiller directed.

== See also ==
- Third Man Museum
- BFI Top 100 British films
- Schönlaterngasse, alleyway in Vienna
- The Third Man: The Official Story of the Film, 2024 non-fiction book
- Angela Allen (script supervisor)
