= Mr. Arkadin =

1955 film by Orson Welles

Mr. Arkadin AKA Confidential Report
- Theatrical release poster
- Directed by: Orson Welles
- Screenplay by: Orson Welles
- Based on: Radio scripts from The Lives of Harry Lime by Ernest Bornemann; Orson Welles
- Produced by: Louis Dolivet; Orson Welles
- Starring: Orson Welles; Robert Arden; Paola Mori; Michael Redgrave; Patricia Medina; Akim Tamiroff; Mischa Auer
- Cinematography: Jean Bourgoin
- Edited by: Renzo Lucidi; Orson Welles (Note: Uncredited)
- Music by: Paul Misraki
- Production company: Mercury Productions; Filmorsa; Cervantes Films; Sevilla Films
- Distributed by: Warner Bros. Pictures (France); Chamartín (Spain)
- Release dates: 27 June 1955 (Spain); 2 June 1956 (France)
- Running time: 99 minutes ("Corinth" version); 93 minutes (Spanish version); 95 minutes (US version); 98 minutes (Confidential Report); 106 minutes (Criterion edit)
- Countries: France; Spain; Switzerland
- Languages: English; Spanish
- Box office: 517,788 admissions (France)

Mr. Arkadin (also released as Confidential Report) is a 1955 thriller film noir written, produced and directed by Orson Welles. It stars Welles, Robert Arden, Paola Mori, Michael Redgrave, Patricia Medina, Akim Tamiroff, Peter van Eyck, and Katina Paxinou. The film centers on an American smuggler (Arden) who is hired by a wealthy amnesiac, the titular Arkadin (Welles), to investigate his mysterious past.

The screenplay was based on scripts Welles had originally co-authored for his radio drama series The Adventures of Harry Lime. A co-production of France, Spain, and Switzerland, it was shot in several locations throughout Western Europe.

Like many of Welles' films, Mr. Arkadin had a difficult production and was released in several different versions. Critic Jonathan Rosenbaum identified at least seven different versions of the story. The film has been praised by directors like Christopher Nolan and Shinji Aoyama.

== Plot ==
Guy Van Stratten, a small-time American smuggler working in Europe, seeks out a Munich resident named Jakob Zouk to warn him about a plot against his life. Zouk is terminally ill and receives the news with apathy, so Stratten explains his personal reasons for wanting to keep Zouk alive. His narrative is accompanied by scenes in flashback.

Stratten's story begins in Naples, where he gets a tip that Gregory Arkadin, a famous international oligarch of Georgian heritage, possesses a dark secret centred on the name “Sophie”. Stratten and his girlfriend and accomplice Mily travel to Arkadin's castle in Spain, hoping to use this meagre information for blackmail. By striking up a friendship with Arkadin's daughter Raina, seemingly the only person for whom Arkadin feels affection, Stratten gets himself invited into the castle.

Arkadin has already learned of Stratten and Mily's interest in him, and of the couple's criminal history. Instead of turning them away he openly offers to pay for information about his past, which has been blotted out by amnesia. Arkadin says that in 1927 he woke up in a square in Switzerland, with a large sum of money in his pocket and no memory of his identity or past career. He successfully rebuilt his life, but is troubled by not knowing how it began; Stratten impresses him as sufficiently discreet and enterprising to find out.

Arkadin takes Mily on a yacht cruise, while Stratten travels the world searching for clues. He communicates periodically with Raina and a romance forms between the two, much to Arkadin's displeasure. From interviews with a strange series of people—the proprietor of a flea circus, a junk-shop owner, an impoverished noblewoman in Paris, and a heroin addict he tortures with withdrawal—Stratten learns that the pre-1927 Arkadin was involved in a sex trafficking ring in Warsaw, abducting girls and selling them into prostitution in South America. "Sophie" is the former leader of the ring and Arkadin's old girlfriend, from whom he stole the money that he found in his pocket in Switzerland. She proves to be a relaxed, tolerant woman who remembers Arkadin with affection and has no intention of publicizing his past.

In the closing stages of the investigation, Stratten discovers that Arkadin has been following him and visiting all the witnesses. He confers with Raina, who startles him by saying that her father does not have amnesia; the entire pretext for hiring Stratten was a fraud.

Stratten attends Arkadin's Christmas Eve party in Munich, where he learns the real purpose of his investigation. Arkadin wished to cover up his criminal past, fearing especially that Raina might learn of it and cease to love him. He used Stratten to locate people possessing potentially dangerous evidence, all of whom have been murdered. Mily is also dead and Stratten has been framed for killing her, with the implication that he too will be silenced before the police catch him. Stratten hastens to find Jakob Zouk, the last surviving member of the sex trafficking ring, hoping to use him as some kind of weapon against Arkadin. Zouk grudgingly consents to go into hiding, but Arkadin soon traces him and has him stabbed to death.

Stratten makes a desperate new plan and buys the last seat on a plane to Barcelona. Raina has agreed to meet him at the airport; there he intends to reveal her father's secret, in the hope that this will break Arkadin's spirit and make him abandon the plot. Arkadin realizes what Stratten is doing and pursues him in a private plane. Stratten and Raina connect at the airport, but she is almost immediately summoned to the control tower to talk to her father on the radio. With no time to explain, Stratten convinces her to say "it's too late". The lie fills Arkadin with despair, and he commits suicide by hurling himself out of his plane.

Ultimately Raina cannot condemn Stratten for the death of her father, but their love affair is at an end. She arranges for an old boyfriend to drive her away from the airport, leaving Stratten alone.

== Cast ==
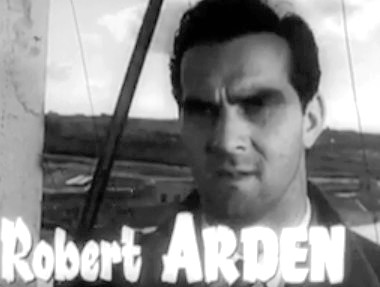
Robert Arden in the American trailer

- Orson Welles as Gregory Arkadin
- Robert Arden as Guy Van Stratten
- Patricia Medina as Mily
- Paola Mori as Raina Arkadin
- Akim Tamiroff as Jakob Zouk
- Michael Redgrave as Burgomil Trebitsch
- Grégoire Aslan as Bracco
- Jack Watling as Bob, the Marquess of Rutleigh
- Mischa Auer as the Professor
- Peter van Eyck as Thaddeus
- Suzanne Flon (English version) / Amparo Rivelles (Spanish version) as Baroness Nagel
- Frederick O'Brady as Oskar
- Katina Paxinou (English version) / Irene Lopez Heredia (Spanish version) as Sophie Radzweickz Martinez
- Tamara Shayne as the woman who hides Zouk
- Terence Longdon as Arkadin's secretary
- Gert Fröbe as a Munich Detective
- Eduard Linkers as a Munich Policeman
- Manuel Requena as Jesus Martinez
- Gordon Heath as the pianist in the Cannes bar

Additionally, Welles dubbed several vocal parts (including Mischa Auer and Frederic O'Brady's lines), and actress Billie Whitelaw dubbed Paola Mori's dialogue to cover her thick Italian accent.

== Production ==
The story was based on several episodes of the radio series The Lives of Harry Lime, which in turn was based on the character that Welles portrayed in The Third Man. The main inspiration for the plot was the episode entitled "Man of Mystery," though some elements may have been lifted from an episode of the radio show Ellery Queen entitled "The Case of the Number Thirty-One," chiefly the similar-sounding name George Arkaris, the mysterious birthplace, the French Riviera property, and the Spanish castle. Most of the other key elements for Arkadin's character come from a real-life arms dealer, Basil Zaharoff.

In an interview for the BBC's Arena series first shown in 1982, Welles described Mr. Arkadin as the "biggest disaster" of his life because of his loss of creative control. The film was not released in the United States until 1962.

Countess Paola Di Girfalco, who played the role of Arkadin's daughter under her stage name of Paola Mori, become Welles's third wife in 1955, some time during the film's production. The film started Welles's longtime relationship with Spain, where he lived for several periods in his life.

Released in some parts of Europe as Confidential Report, this film shares themes and stylistic devices with The Third Man (1949).

== Multiple versions of the film ==
Several differing versions of the film were released. In his 1991 essay "The Seven Arkadins", film historian Jonathan Rosenbaum identified seven different versions of the story, and since its initial publication, two more versions have emerged, including a novel and a stage play. When Welles missed an editing deadline, producer Louis Dolivet took the film out of his hands and released several edits of the film, none of which were approved by Welles. Adding to the confusion is a novel of the same title that was credited to Welles, though Welles claimed that he was unaware of the book's existence until he saw a copy in a bookshop. Welles's friend Maurice Bessy, a French screenwriter, is generally considered to be the author of the novel.

=== The "seven versions" ===
In his 1991 essay "The Seven Arkadins", film historian Jonathan Rosenbaum identified seven different versions of the story, and since the essay's initial publication, two more versions have emerged.

==== Pre-film ====
1. Three episodes of the radio series The Lives of Harry Lime, written, directed by and starring Welles. The basic plot of a wealthy Mr. Arkadian (spelt with three As in this version, though pronounced "Arkadin" by Welles himself) commissioning a confidential report on his former life can be found in the episode "Man of Mystery" (first broadcast 11 April 1952), while the episodes "Murder on the Riviera" (first broadcast 23 May 1952) and "Blackmail Is a Nasty Word" (first broadcast 13 July 1952) both contain plot elements repeated in the film. Note that in the film, the popular Harry Lime character from The Third Man is replaced by the less sympathetic Guy Van Stratten, since Welles did not own the copyright to the Lime character as character rights had been bought by Harry Alan Towers for the Lives of Harry Lime radio series.

2. Masquerade, an early version of the screenplay of what would eventually become Mr. Arkadin, has substantial differences from the film versions. The screenplay follows a strictly chronological structure rather than the back-and-forth structure of the film. Many of the scenes in the film are set in different countries, and a lengthy sequence in Mexico is entirely missing from the final film.

==== Different edits of the film released in Welles' life ====
Crucially, none of the versions available before 2006 contained all the footage found in the others; each had some elements missing from other versions, and each has substantial editing differences from the others.

3. The main Spanish-language version of Mr. Arkadin (93 mins) was filmed back-to-back with the English-language version and was the first to be released, premiering in Madrid in March 1955. Although the cast and crew were largely the same, two characters were played by Spanish actors: Amparo Rivelles plays Baroness Nagel and Irene Lopez Heredia plays Sophie Radzweickz Martinez. The two scenes with the actresses were reshot in Spanish, but all others had Spanish dubbing over English dialogue. This version credits Robert Arden as "Bob Harden".

4. There is a second, longer Spanish-language cut of Mr. Arkadin, which was unknown to Rosenbaum at the time he wrote "The Seven Arkadins". (He confessed in the essay to having seen only brief clips of one version.) This version credits Robert Arden as "Mark Sharpe".

5. Confidential Report (98 mins), the most common European release print of Mr. Arkadin, premiered in London in August 1955. Differences to this version include off-screen narration from Van Stratten. Rosenbaum speculates that the editing of this version was based on an early draft of Welles' screenplay, as its exposition is far simpler than that of the "Corinth" version.

6. The "Corinth" version (99 mins) is named after Corinth Films, the initial U.S. distributor of the film. Until the 2006 Criterion re-edit, it was believed to be the closest version to Welles' conception. Peter Bogdanovich discovered its existence in 1961 and secured its first U.S. release in 1962, seven years after alternative versions of the film were released in Europe.

7. The most widely seen version of Mr. Arkadin (95 mins) is the U.S. release version which entirely removes the film's flashback structure and presents a simpler, linear narrative. Rosenbaum describes it as "the least satisfactory version", which is a "clumsily truncated" edit of the "Corinth" version, often editing out half-sentences, making some dialogue incomprehensible.

This version is often erroneously thought of as being in the public domain but as the film is a European co-production its copyright does not expire until 2068, seventy years after the 1998 death of the last surviving co-creator, composer Paul Misraki. The vast majority of DVD releases are very poor quality bootlegs of the US version.

=== An eighth - novelization ===
8. The novel Mr. Arkadin was first published in French in Paris in 1955, and then in English in 1956, both in London and New York. Welles was credited as author, and the book's dustjacket boasted: "It is perhaps surprising that Orson Welles … has not written a novel before."

"I didn't write one word of that novel. Nor have I ever read it," Welles told Peter Bogdanovich. "Somebody wrote it in French to be published in serial form in the newspapers. You know — to promote the picture. I don't know how it got under hardcovers, or who got paid for that." It was serialised in the U.K. newspaper the Daily Express in 1955.

Welles always denied authorship of the book, and French actor-writer Maurice Bessy, who is credited as having translated the book into French, was long rumoured to be the real author. Rosenbaum suggested that the book was written in French and then translated into English, as lines from the script were approximations that seemed to have been translated from English to French and back to English. Research by film scholar François Thomas in the papers of Louis Dolivet has uncovered documentary proof that Bessy was indeed the author.

=== The 9th - Criterion edit, "The Comprehensive Version" (2006) ===
9. While no version of the film can claim to be definitive, as Welles never finished editing the film, this version (105 mins) is likely the closest to Welles's original vision, though the assemblers of this restored version express their doubts as to the "correctness" of altering another artist's work. It was compiled in 2006 by Stefan Drössler of the Munich Film Museum and Claude Bertemes of the Cinémathèque municipale de Luxembourg, with both Peter Bogdanovich and Jonathan Rosenbaum giving technical assistance. It uses all available English-language footage, and attempts to follow Welles's structure and editing style as closely as possible and also incorporates his comments over the years on where the other editions of the film went wrong. However, it remains an approximation; for instance, Welles remarked that his version of the film began with a woman's body (Mily) on a beach, including a close-up that makes her identity apparent. Whilst the Criterion edit restores the film opening on a woman's body on the beach, only a long shot exists (taken from the Corinth version) in which it is unclear whose body it is; no close-up of Mily could be used, as the footage no longer exists.

The Criterion Collection release includes the following:

- The "Corinth" version of the film
- The Confidential Report version of the film
- The "Comprehensive" version of the film
- Commentary tracks by Welles film scholars Jonathan Rosenbaum and James Naremore
- A video essay about the different versions and the editing of the "Comprehensive" version
- Clips from one of the Spanish-language versions
- The three Harry Lime radio episodes on which the film was based, "Man of Mystery", "Murder on the Riviera", and "Blackmail Is a Nasty Word"

The first edition of the Criterion release also included a paperback copy of the novel, but that version of the set is now out of print.

== Reception ==
Japanese film director Shinji Aoyama listed Confidential Report as one of the greatest films of all time. In 2012 he said, "No other movie is destructive as Confidential Report, which gives me different emotions every time I see it. Achieving this kind of indetermination in a film is the highest goal that I always hope for, but can never achieve."

Filmmaker Christopher Nolan stated in his Criterion Top 10 from 2013, "No one could make much of a case for Welles’ abortive movie overall" but that the film contains "heartbreaking glimpses of the great man’s genius".

== See also ==
- The Scorpion and the Frog § Origins
