= Henry H. Straight =

American educator

2nd President of Peru State College
- In office 1871 – 1871
- Preceded by: John M. McKenzie
- Succeeded by: A. D. Williams

Personal details
- Born: Henry Harrison Straight; July 20, 1846 Charlotte, New York, U.S.
- Died: November 17, 1886 (aged 40) Pasadena, California, U.S.
- Spouse: Emma Dickerman
- Children: Willard Dickerman Straight; Hazel Straight
- Relatives: Whitney Willard Straight (grandson); Beatrice Whitney Straight (granddaughter); Michael Whitney Straight (grandson)
- Education: Oberlin College
- Alma mater: Cornell University; Harvard University
- Occupation: Professor

Henry Harrison Straight (July 20, 1846 – November 17, 1886) was an American geologist, professor, second president of Peru State College, and the father of investment banker and diplomat Willard Dickerman Straight.

== Early life ==
Henry Harrison Straight was born on July 20, 1846, in Charlotte, New York, within Chautauqua County, New York. He was orphaned while still a boy and supported himself by working on a local farm.

When he was 16 he began teaching at his first school, earning $39 from three months' teaching that afforded him the opportunity to enter the preparatory school of Oberlin College in Oberlin, Ohio. He later attended special study at Cornell University and became a member of the Royal Geographical Society. From 1875 to 1876, he was at Harvard University and again at Cornell University, in another special study.

== Career ==
From January 1871 until 1873, Straight became a science teacher as well as the second president (referred to as principal at the time) of Peru Normal School in Peru, Nebraska, establishing the reputation for the young college that was only opened six years earlier in 1865. He took over as president from the college's first president, John M. McKenzie.

In 1873, he joined the Science Department of Central Missouri Normal School in Warrensburg along with his wife, Emma, also an educator. In the summer of 1873, Henry and Emma attended the inaugural program at the Anderson School of Natural History on Penikese Island, a school for naturalists and science teachers ran by distinguished Swiss naturalist Louis Agassiz. After Straight returned to Missouri, he tried to put into practice the methods of scientific study that Agassiz taught, combining them with procedures he developed as a classroom teacher at Peru. Henry worked at the college until 1875, when he and Emma both resigned. In 1874, he returned to Penikese and in 1875, he embarked on a geological expedition in the mountains of Carolina and Kentucky with Harvard professor and director of Kentucky Geological Survey, Nathaniel Shaler.

From 1876 until 1883, he taught at the Oswego Normal School in Oswego, New York, where he was the chair of Natural Sciences department. In 1880, he became chair of the Practice School and in 1882, he was also given charge of Psychology and the History of Education departments.

In the spring of 1883, he taught at Cook County Normal School in Chicago over Col. Francis W. Parker, a pioneer of the progressive school movement in the United States.

From 1883 to 1884, he in charge of Industrial Science and Pedagogy at the Martha's Vineyard Summer Institute.

In the fall of 1885, his health began declining from tuberculosis and he moved to Florida to recover, moving again to Pasadena, California in the spring of the following year.

== Personal life ==
In 1873, Straight married Emma Dickerman (1850–1890), also an educator, who was born at Beardstown, Illinois, and was the daughter of Col. Willard Arms Dickerman (d. 1864), of the 103rd Illinois Infantry who died from a wound received while commanding of a brigade at Resaca, Georgia. Her mother was Margaret Elizabeth Deaver. Emma was descended from Thomas Dickerman, who likely came to America from Bristol with the Reverend Richard Mather in 1636 and settled in Dorchester. Emma was described as an artist who loved poetry, pictures, and beauty in all its forms, but above all else, she loved people. Together they had:

- Willard Dickerman Straight (1880–1918), who in 1911 married Dorothy Payne Whitney (1887–1968), a member of the prominent Whitney family, in Geneva, Switzerland. Her father was William Collins Whitney, the United States Secretary of the Navy during the first Cleveland administration, and her mother was Flora Payne, the daughter of Senator Henry B. Payne of Ohio and sister of Col. Oliver Hazard Payne.
- Hazel Straight (1882–1922), a 1905 graduate of Vassar who married James Forest Sanborn (1876–1949), a Harvard graduate of 1899, on September 19, 1911. He was the son of Jeremiah Sanborn (1837–1881) and Anna Elizabeth Batchelder (1841–1920). Hazel became a teacher at the Bradford Academy in Bradford, Massachusetts.

Straight died on November 17, 1886, in California after a year of declining heath, followed shortly thereafter by his wife in 1890, also of tuberculosis. Before her death, Emma moved to Tokyo, Japan, where she spent two years learning Japanese and teaching at the Normal School there. Like his father, their son was orphaned at a young age, 10. Willard and his sister were taken in by Dr. Elvire Ranier, one of the earliest woman physicians in the country, and her friend (and fellow spinster who she lived with), Laura R. Newkirk of Oswego, women who were teachers and close friends of his parents, who cared for and educated the children.

=== Descendants ===
His grandchildren included: Whitney Willard Straight (1912–1979), a Grand Prix motor racing driver, aviator, and businessman, Beatrice Whitney Straight (1914–2001), an Academy Award-winning actress, Michael Whitney Straight (1916–2004), a former Soviet spy, and Dorothy Straight Sanborn (1918–1947).

=== Legacy ===
According to the Nebraska State Historical Society:

The success of Straight's career does not lie in his publications or even in the large number of students he influenced. Rather he was significant because he influenced other persons who themselves became educational leaders.

In the Annual Report of the Regents of the university, to the Legislature of the State of New York, Straight was described as follows:

His great aim during mature years was to bring science to the people, through which he believed better thinking and better living could be secured; hence he chose to work in normal schools, rejecting higher salaries and more honored positions in other educational institutions, hoping thus to train teachers who in turn would train the children and youth of our land.
