= Mona von Bismarck =

American socialite (1897–1983)

Countess Mona von Bismarck
- The Kentucky Countess (detail), painting from 1943 by Salvador Dalí, courtesy of the Mona Bismarck American Center in Paris
- Born: Mona Strader; February 5, 1897; Louisville, Kentucky, United States
- Died: July 10, 1983 (aged 86); Paris, France
- Resting place: Locust Valley Cemetery, Locust Valley, New York, U.S.
- Other name: "The Kentucky Countess"
- Occupation: Socialite
- Spouse(s): Henry J. Schlesinger (1917–1920); James Irving Bush (1921–1925); Harrison Williams (1926–1953); Count Albrecht Edzard von Bismarck-Schönhausen (1955–1970); Count Umberto de Martini (1971–1979)
- Children: Robert Henry Schlesinger

Countess Mona von Bismarck-Schönhausen (née Strader; February 5, 1897 – July 10, 1983), also known as Mona Bismarck, was an American socialite, fashion icon, and philanthropist. Her five husbands included Harrison Williams, among the richest men in America, and Count Albrecht Eduard "Eddie" von Bismarck-Schönhausen, a grandson of German Chancellor Otto von Bismarck. She was the first American to be named "The Best Dressed Woman in the World" by a panel of top couturiers, including Coco Chanel, and she was named to the International Best Dressed List Hall of Fame.

== Early life ==
She was born as Mona Strader in Louisville, Kentucky in 1897 to Robert Sims Strader and his wife, Bird O'Shockeny. Her parents divorced in 1902, and she and her brother were raised in Liberty Heights, Kentucky by their paternal grandmother.

Through their mother, Patricia Strader, she was the great-aunt to automobile racers David "Salt" Walther and George "Skipp" Walther III.

== Marriages ==
In 1917, she married Henry J. Schlesinger, a man 18 years her senior who owned Fairland Farm in Lexington, where her father was a professional trainer, and moved to Milwaukee, where he had an iron and coke business. During the marriage, she bore a son, Robert Henry, whom she left in the custody of Schlesinger in exchange for $500,000 when they divorced in 1920. (Her son would marry Frederica Barker, elder sister of actor Lex Barker.) In 1921, she married banker James Irving Bush, 14 years her senior, said to be the "handsomest man in America". They divorced in Paris in 1925.

In 1926, she opened a New York dress shop with her friend Laura Merriam Curtis, the daughter of William Rush Merriam, a former governor of Minnesota. At the time, Laura had been previously engaged to Harrison Williams, reputed to be the richest man in America, with an estimated fortune of $600 million ($10,900,000,000 in today dollars; $37,500,000,000 in gold-dollars (at $1275/tr.oz)), made in financing public utilities. On July 2, 1926, she married Williams, a widower 24 years her senior. For their honeymoon, they went on a cruise around the world on Williams' Warrior, at the time, the largest, most expensive pleasure boat in the world.

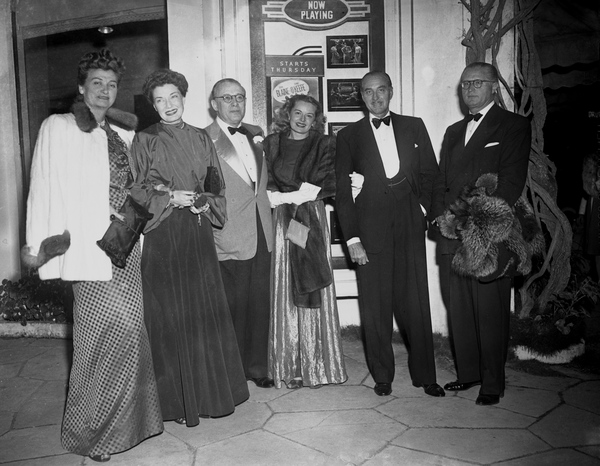
Bismarck (second from left) in 1943

When they returned from their honeymoon, Williams bought the Georgian mansion at the corner of 94th Street and Fifth Avenue designed by Delano and Aldrich in 1915 for Willard Straight. She had it decorated by Syrie Maugham. They also kept an estate named Oak Point on Bayville Avenue in Bayville, Long Island, for which Delano and Aldrich also did alterations. They kept a home on North Ocean Avenue in Palm Beach, Florida, and the villa Il Fortino overlooking Capri's Marina Grande, on land which belonged first to Caesar Augustus, and later to the Emperor Tiberius.

In 1933, she was named "The Best Dressed Woman in the World" by Chanel, Molyneux, Vionnet, Lelong, and Lanvin, becoming the first American to be so honored. The Duchess of Windsor (1934) and Elsie de Wolfe (1935) also earned that title. She was named to the International Best Dressed List Hall of Fame in 1958.

In Ridin' High (1936), Cole Porter had Ethel Merman sing: "What do I care if Mrs. Harrison Williams is the best dressed woman in town?" In 1943, her portrait was painted by Salvador Dalí.

Williams died in 1953, and in January 1955, she married her "secretary" Count Albrecht Edzard Heinrich Karl von Bismarck-Schönhausen (1903–1970), an aristocratic "interior decorator", the son of Herbert, Prince of Bismarck and grandson of German Chancellor Otto von Bismarck, civilly in New Jersey, and in February 1956, religiously in Rome. They lived mostly in Paris at an apartment in the famed Hôtel Lambert, later at her townhouse at 34 avenue de New York, and at Capri.

In 1970, she was widowed again, and in 1971, she married Bismarck's physician "Count" Umberto de Martini, a nobleman (after she acquired a title for him from King Umberto II of Italy), who was 14 years younger than she. Only after his death in a sports car accident in 1979 (later referenced by socialites as "Martini on the rocks") did she realize that Martini, like Bismarck, had married her for her money (exactly the same way she had married Schlesinger, Bush, and Williams, so many years before). Martini turned out to be already married and had been secretly bilking her of funds for his children.

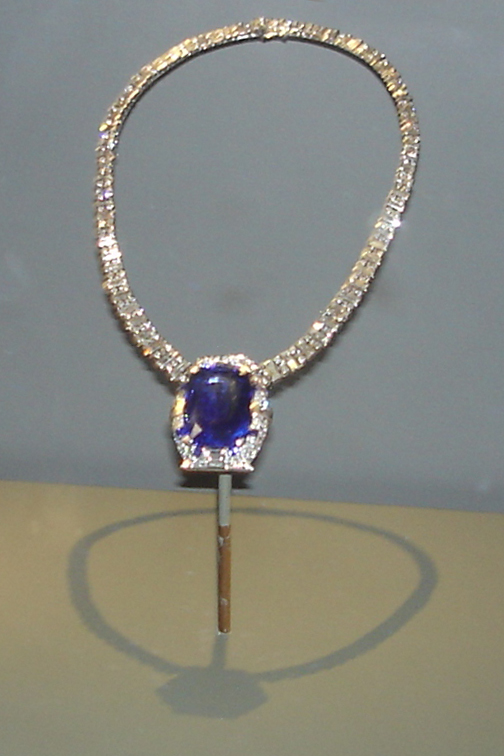
Bismarck Sapphire Necklace, National Museum of Natural History

When Cristóbal Balenciaga closed his atelier in 1968, Diana Vreeland quipped that von Bismarck did not leave her bedroom in the villa at Capri for three days. She donated her papers and photos to the Filson Historical Society in 1976, and several items of unique jewelry to the Smithsonian Institution, including the Bismarck Sapphire Necklace.

She might have been one of the possible models for the character Kate McCloud in Truman Capote's Answered Prayers (1987).

== Later life and death ==
Von Bismarck was a celebrated socialite of her day. In 1976, she donated her papers and photographs to the Filson Historical Society. The Mona Strader Bismarck Papers span 1916–1994 and are primarily made up of personal correspondence. Most of the letters were written by members of the social world in which she lived. They include Duchess of Windsor, Diana Vreeland, Gore Vidal, Randolph Churchill, Constantin Alajalov (cover illustrator for The New Yorker and the Saturday Evening Post), jewelry designer Jean Schlumberger, Hubert de Givenchy, and Cecil Beaton.

After a life in the social spotlight at the centre of café society, she eventually retired from the social scene, splitting her time between her Paris townhouse and her villa in Capri. Toward the end of her life, and with her eyesight beginning to fail, she spent her final years with dispatching her papers, paintings and items from her collections to various museums and cultural societies.

Von Bismarck died in 1983 at the age of 86. She was buried in a Givenchy gown and rests with her third and fourth husbands, Harrison Williams and Eddie Von Bismarck, in Locust Valley Cemetery, on Long Island. She left instruction in her will for her remaining fortune, plus the proceeds from the sale of her estates, to establish the Mona Bismarck Foundation, which funded the Mona Bismarck American Center in Paris. This institution was renamed the American Center for Art and Culture in 2019, and was unwound in 2022 with proceeds and assets going to the American Library in Paris.
