= Willard D. Straight House =

Historic house in Manhattan, New York

Coordinates: 40°47′11.8″N 73°57′22.9″W

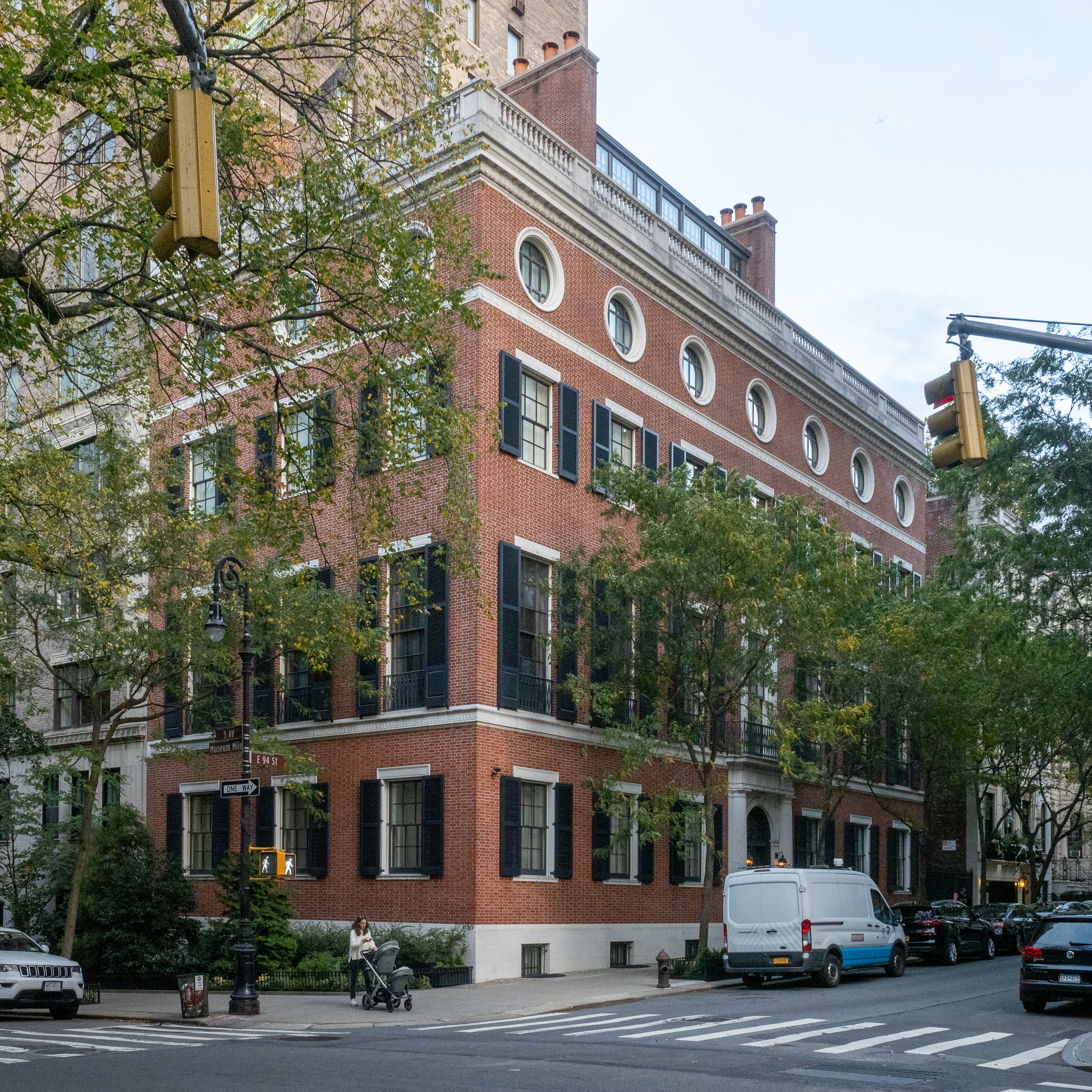
Willard D. Straight House

The Willard D. Straight House is a mansion at 1130 Fifth Avenue, at 94th Street, in the Carnegie Hill section of the Upper East Side of Manhattan in New York City, New York. The mansion was designed by Delano & Aldrich in the neo-Georgian style and was completed in 1915 as the New York City residence of Willard Dickerman Straight. The mansion is a New York City designated landmark.

== History ==
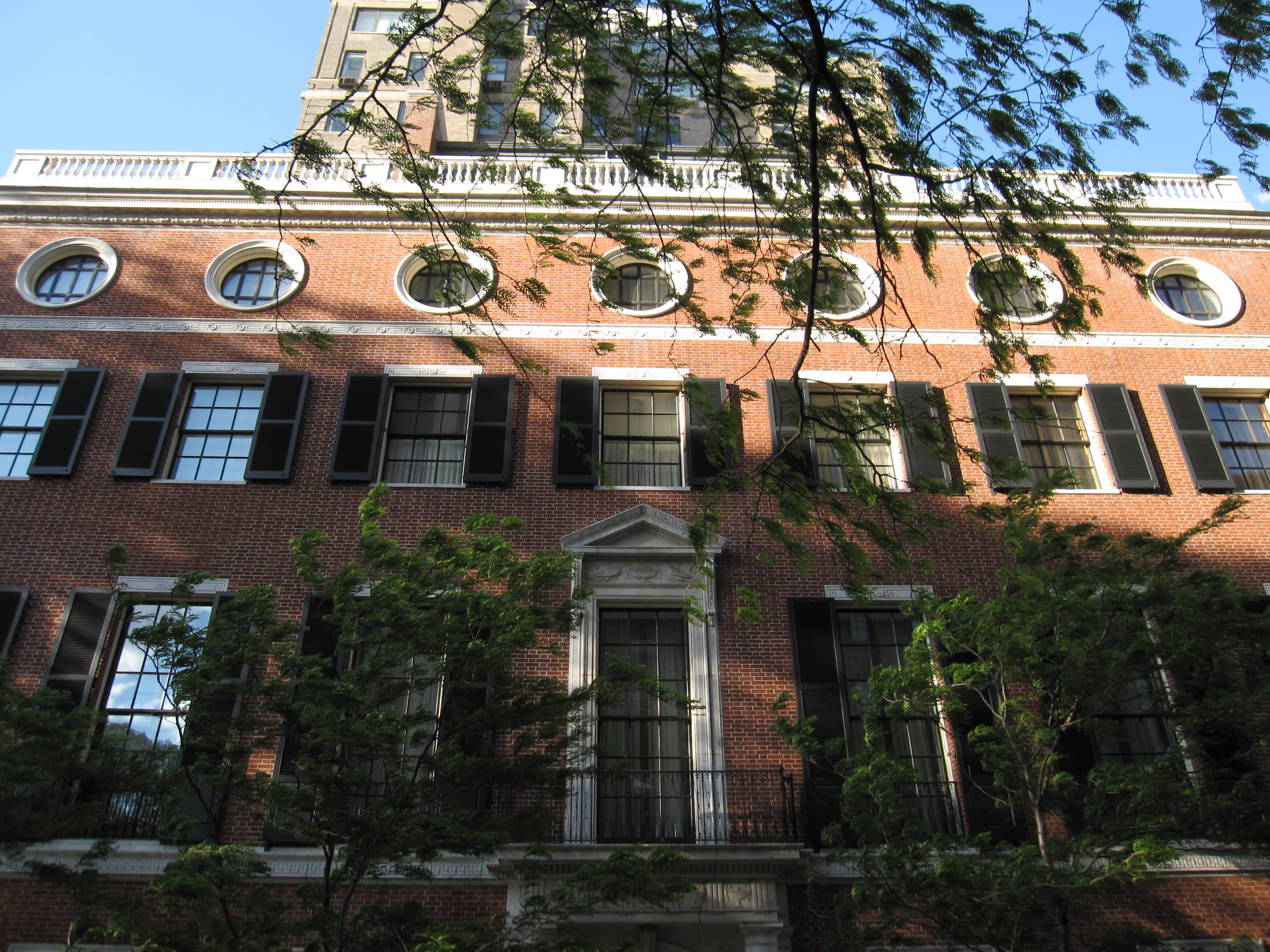

The house was designed by the firm of Delano & Aldrich in the neo-Georgian style and was completed in 1915. The ground floor of the house is organized around a circular hallway in the 18th-century style topped by a dome, with a patterned black and white marble floor. The Straight family also owned a complementary building at 162 East 92nd Street, also designed by Delano & Aldrich, that was used as a garage. The second and third floors of this building contained apartments for staff. Straight died during the influenza epidemic of 1918 and his widow Dorothy Whitney Straight continued to live in the house for several years with her children. She remarried and moved to England but continued to own the house until 1927.

The house was sold to Judge Elbert H. Gary, Chairman of the Board of Directors of the United States Steel Corporation (who had recently sold his home at 956 Fifth Avenue which was demolished to make way for a new apartment building), who died in the house the same year. The next owner was Harrison Williams, a utilities investor, and his wife Mona.

In 1952, the house was sold to the Audubon Society for use as their headquarters, which they called the Audubon House. The Society left in 1971, In 1974, the building was sold to the International Center of Photography for use as a new museum devoted exclusively to photography with photo‐journalist Cornell Capa as executive director. The mansion is a New York City designated landmark.

In 2000, ICP sold the building for $17.5 million to hedge fund founder Bruce Kovner for use as a personal residence. The noise and debris associated with Kovner's years-long conversion of the building back to a residence reportedly caused his neighbors dismay.

== See also ==
- List of New York City Designated Landmarks in Manhattan from 59th to 110th Streets
- National Register of Historic Places listings in Manhattan from 59th to 110th Streets
