= Harrison Williams (entrepreneur) =

American entrepreneur and investor

Harrison Charles Williams (March 16, 1873 – November 10, 1953) was an American entrepreneur, investor, and multi-millionaire.

== Early life ==
Harrison Williams was born in Avon Township, Ohio in 1873 to Everett Williams and Laurett A. Williams. He graduated from Elyria High School in 1890.

== Career ==
Williams abandoned an unsuccessful bicycle manufacturing business in Lorain, Ohio, in 1903. He relocated to New York City and worked for a carpet sweeper company. In 1906, he created American Gas & Electric Co., and six years later created another holding company, Central States Electric Corp.

During World War I, he served as an assistant to Bernard Baruch, at the War Industries Board, in Washington D.C., through Baruch he was introduced to attorney John Foster Dulles, who represented Williams throughout his business career.

By 1929, Williams had accumulated a fortune estimated at a $680 million (equivalent to about $12.8 billion in 2025) in public utilities, making him one of the wealthiest men in the country. He also began a business partnership with Waddill Catchings of Goldman Sachs & Co.

In 1937, he was investigated regarding investment trusts by the Securities and Exchange Commission. Also that year he began an affair with Coco Chanel.

== Philanthropy and social networks ==
In 1923, Williams financed and sponsored a trip to the Galápagos Islands through the New York Zoological Society that was led by naturalist William Beebe. With Vincent Astor and Marshall Field he also financed Beebe's second expedition to the Galapagos and the Sargasso Sea. Because of his patronage, Beebe named a volcano in the Galapagos after Williams. (Today this volcano is known as Volcán Darwin.) Williams also contributed financially to the American Museum of Natural History's 1926 expedition to Greenland, led by George P. Putnam.

== Personal life ==
In 1900, he married Katherine Gordon Breed in Pittsburgh. She died in 1915. In 1926, at age 53, after being a widower for 11 years, Williams married the divorcée Mona Bush, 24 years his junior. Born Mona Strader, she was the daughter of a Kentucky horse farm worker.

Williams bought the Krupp-built Vanadis, then the largest private yacht afloat, with a cruising radius of 12,000 mi., renamed her Warrior, and refitted her for his own oceanographic and pleasure purposes. As the Lady Hutton, she has been a floating hotel in Stockholm Harbor, Sweden. They departed on a year-long around-the-world honeymoon cruise on the Warrior. The trip was chronicled by Paul Cravath, a prominent New York City attorney. In 1933, she became the first American voted the "Best Dressed Woman in the World."

The couple had several residences: one in Manhattan, one just outside New York City, and one in Florida. They bought the Willard D. Straight House at 94th Street and Fifth Avenue from steel magnate Elbert Gary. (Note: The mansion in more recent times has been owned by Bruce Kovner.) They bought the estate Blythedunes, at 513 North County Blvd., Palm Beach, Florida. It was designed by Maurice Fatio. They bought a Long Island estate in the village of Bayville. As "Dunstable", it had been the home of Winslow S. Pierce, the senior partner in the Wall Street law firm of Pierce & Greer, and the attorney for George Jay Gould I, the railroad executive and son of railroad financier Jay Gould. Williams renamed it "Oak Point", and commissioned architects Delano & Aldrich to convert the mansion from a Dutch Colonial exterior to an English Georgian motif. He also added an indoor tennis and swimming pavilion, several holes of golf, formal gardens designed by Beatrix Farrand & the Olmstead firm, and remodeled a U-shaped carriage house to accommodate his fourteen Rolls-Royce automobiles. This carriage house now serves as the Bayville village hall, library and museum. In 1927, Williams commissioned muralist Jose Maria Sert to create paintings depicting tightrope walkers and acrobats to decorate the Art Deco lounge of the sports pavilion. Mona Williams later had these removed to her villa, "Il Fortino", on Italy's isle of Capri.

When the Prince of Wales (later Edward VIII) visited the United States on various occasions, he was Williams' guest at Glen Cove, Long Island, in the house Williams rented from banker J. P. Morgan Jr., and later at Oak Point, located just a few miles east, in Bayville, on Pine Island.

Williams died at Bayville in 1953. In 1955, his widow married her secretary, Count Albrecht "Eddy" Von Bismarck, thus becoming the Countess Von Bismarck. She spent much of the balance of her life living in Paris, and summering at her villa on the Isle of Capri, but returned to her Bayville estate several times each year. At Mona's death in 1983, by then known as "The Kentucky Countess," her will established the Mona Bismarck American Center for Art & Culture, at 34 Avenue de New York, Paris, dedicated to improving Franco-American cultural relations, which is housed in her former Parisian townhouse. The house also houses the American Club in Paris.
