= Dorothy Payne Whitney =

American-born social activist, philanthropist and publisher

Dorothy Payne Whitney Elmhirst
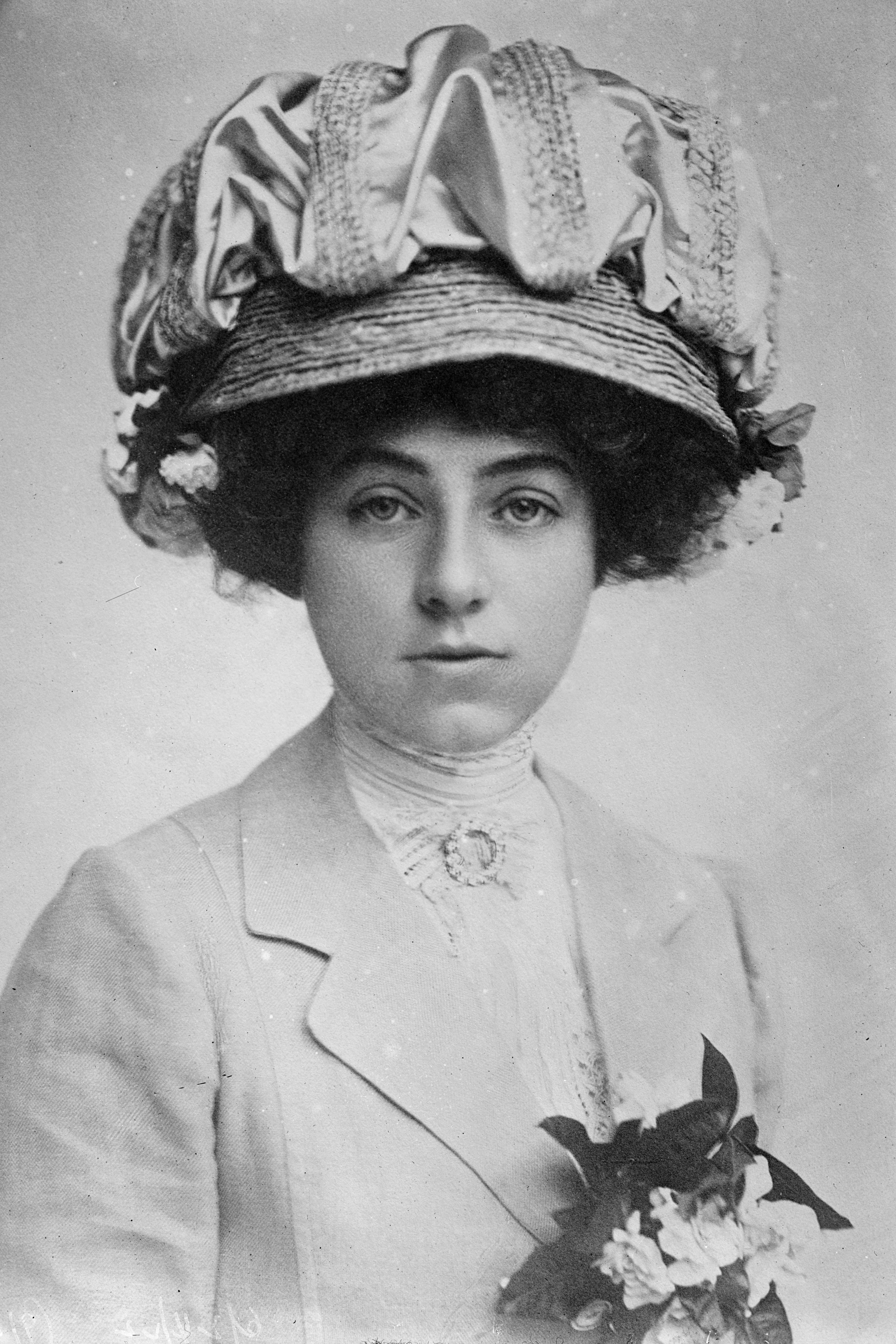
- Dorothy Payne Whitney in 1915
- Born: Dorothy Payne Whitney; January 23, 1887; Washington, D.C., United States
- Died: December 14, 1968 (aged 81); Dartington Hall, Devon, UK
- Education: Chapin School
- Spouses: Willard Dickerman Straight (m. 1911; died 1918) Leonard Knight Elmhirst (m. 1925)
- Children: Whitney Willard Straight; Beatrice Whitney Straight; Michael Whitney Straight; Ruth Elmhirst; William Elmhirst
- Parent(s): William Collins Whitney; Flora Payne
- Relatives: See Whitney family

Dorothy Payne Elmhirst (née Whitney, previously Straight; January 23, 1887 – December 14, 1968) was an American-born social activist, philanthropist, publisher and a member of the prominent Whitney family.

== Life and work ==
Whitney was born in Washington, D.C., the daughter of Flora (née Payne) and William Collins Whitney, the United States Secretary of the Navy during the first Cleveland administration from 1885 through 1889. Flora was the daughter of Senator Henry B. Payne of Ohio and sister of Colonel Oliver Hazard Payne, later treasurer of the Standard Oil Company. She attended the Chapin School. At age 17, she came into a major inheritance, approximately $15,000,000 (equivalent to $537,500,000 in 2025 dollars), following the death of her extremely wealthy father.

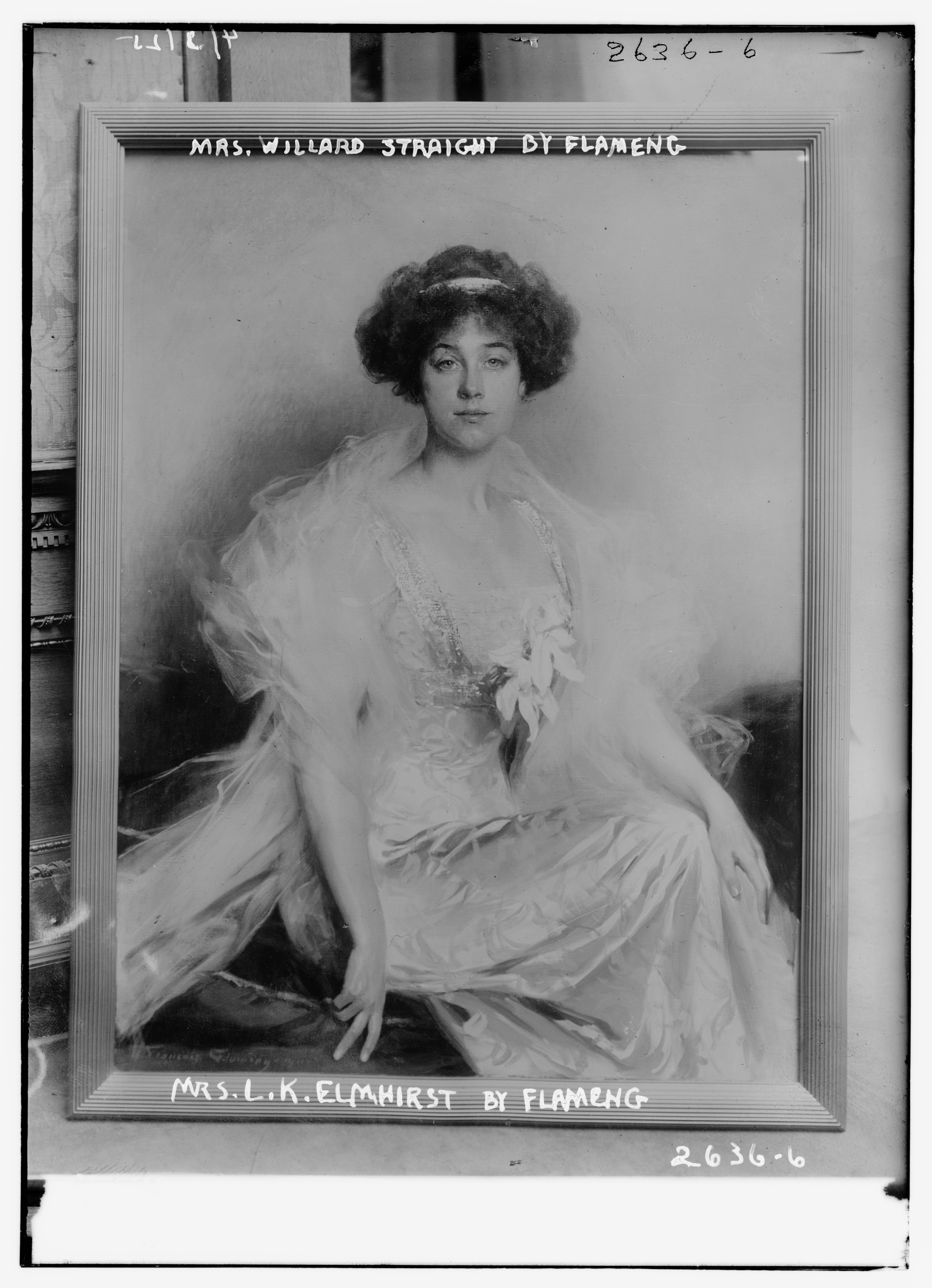
Mrs. Willard Straight by Flameng

One of the wealthiest women in America in the early 20th century, Dorothy Whitney Straight was a philanthropist and social activist who supported women's trade unions and educational and charitable organizations such as the Junior League of New York. She became the first president of the Association of Junior Leagues International in 1921. Together with her husband, she founded the weekly magazine The New Republic and the New School for Social Research in New York City.

Records of Dorothy Payne Whitney in New York City reveal the extent of her philanthropic work. She was a benefactor of the arts, feminist, and pacifist causes, as well as social and labour reform. She lent financial support to progressive alternative education plus scholarly research. In 1937, she created the William C. Whitney Foundation in her father's name.

== Personal life ==
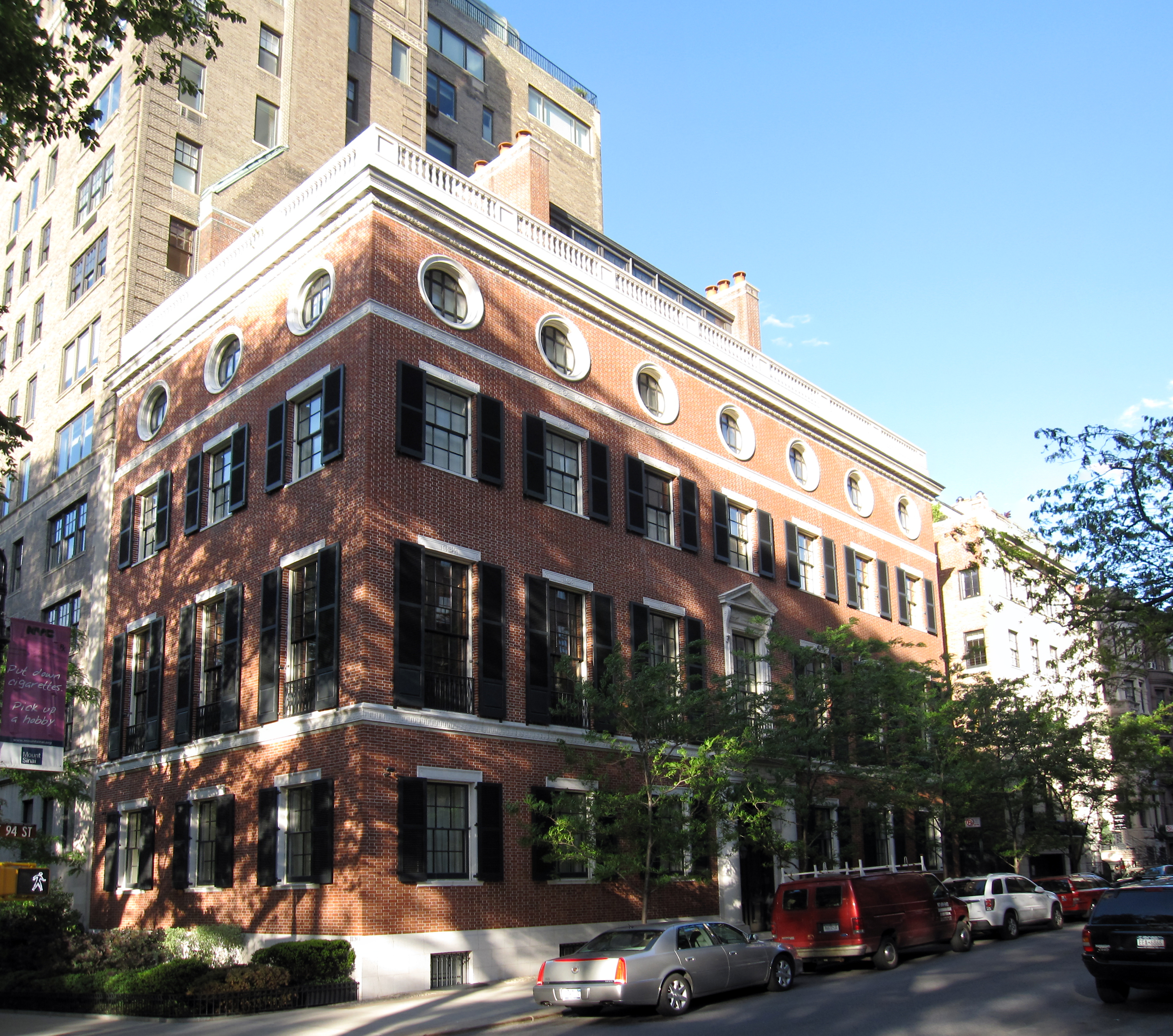
Dorothy's New York residence at 1130 Fifth Avenue

=== First marriage ===
Her first marriage in 1911 was to Willard Dickerman Straight (1880–1918), the son of Henry H. Straight, from Oswego, New York, who went to Cornell University and by the age of 30 was a powerful man amongst the international community trading in Peking, China. Together, they had three children:

- Whitney Willard Straight (1912–1979), who married Lady Daphne Margarita Finch-Hatton (1913–2003), the daughter of Guy Finch-Hatton, the 14th Earl of Winchilsea
- Beatrice Whitney Straight (1914–2001), who married Louis Dolivet (1908–1989), then later Peter Cookson (1913–1990)
- Michael Whitney Straight (1916–2004), who first married Belinda Crompton, then later Nina Gore Auchincloss (the daughter of Hugh D. Auchincloss and the step-sister of Jackie Kennedy), and lastly, Katharine Gould

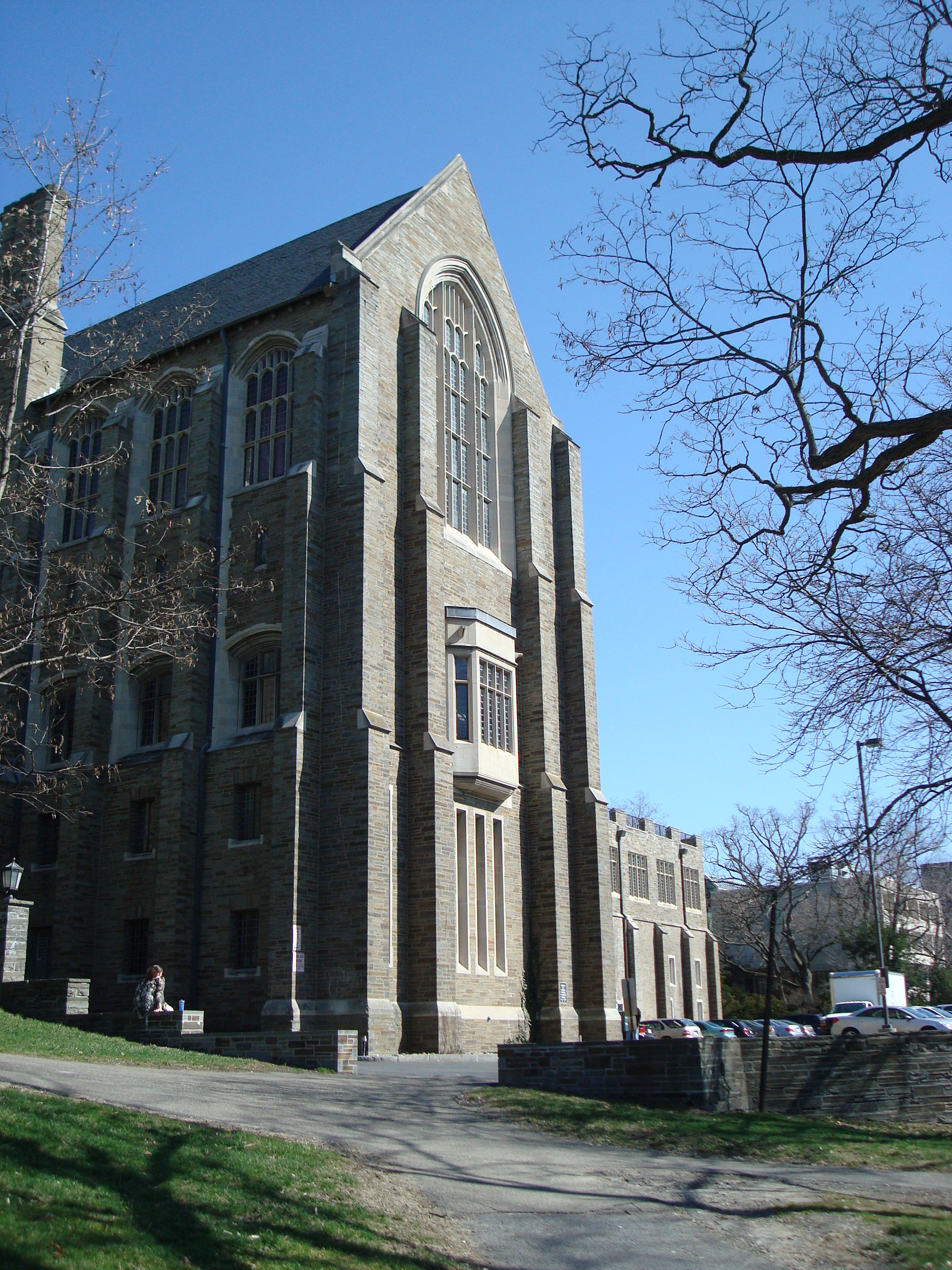
Willard Straight Hall at Cornell, opened in 1925.

Straight died at the age of 38 of influenza during the 1918 pandemic while serving with the United States Army in France during World War I. Straight's will requested his wife to continue his philanthropic work in support of Cornell and in 1925, she built Willard Straight Hall, a student union building dedicated to her late husband's memory.

=== Second marriage ===
In 1920, she met Leonard Knight Elmhirst (1893–1974), an Englishman from a Yorkshire landowning family, who was then studying agriculture at Cornell University, and was seeking support for Cornell's Cosmopolitan Club which provided amenities for foreign students. They married in April 1925, and embarked on ambitious plans to recreate rural community life at Dartington Hall in Devon. Together, they had two children: Ruth Elmhirst (1926–1986), who married Maurice Ash (1917–2003) in 1947, and William Elmhirst (born 1929).

George Bernard Shaw called Dartington a "salon in the countryside": it attracted British intellectuals like Aldous Huxley and Gerald Heard, and the American constitutional psychologist William Sheldon. At Dartington she led local artistic developments, founding Dartington College of Arts and Dartington International Summer School – although she and Leonard also continued their worldwide interests. On April 26, 1935, she renounced her United States citizenship.

Dorothy Payne Whitney Elmhirst died on December 14, 1968.

=== Influence ===
Dorothy was known for building the Willard Straight Hall at Cornell University, founding The New Republic, founding New School for Social Research, being the founding president of Association of Junior Leagues International, founding the William C. Whitney Foundation, renovating Dartington Hall and its gardens, founding the Dartington Hall Trust, founding the Dartington Hall School, founding the Dartington College of Arts, and hosting the Dartington International Summer School from 1953.
