= Bayville, New York =

- Village
- Incorporated Village of Bayville
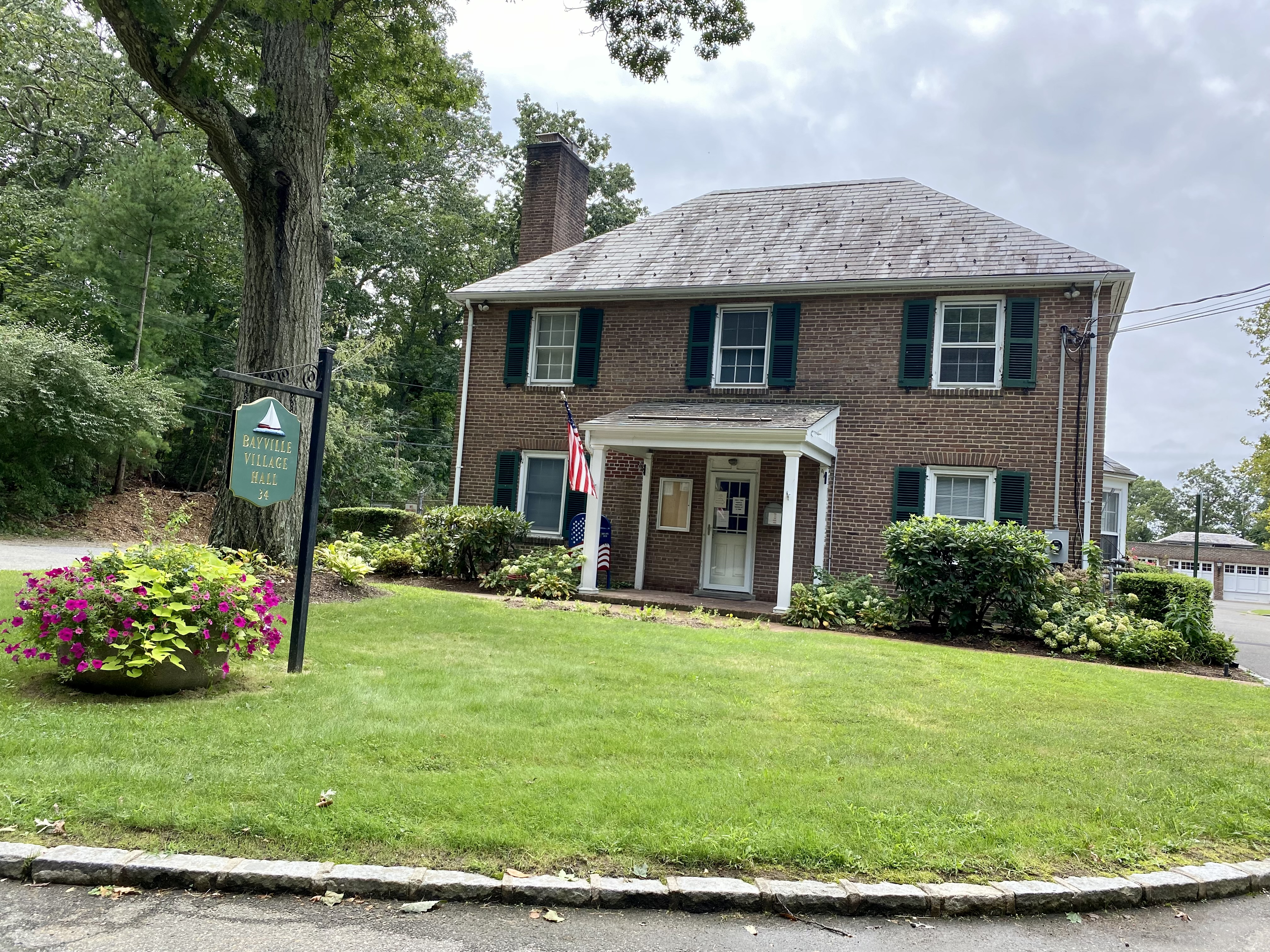
- Bayville Village Hall in 2021

- Seal
- Nickname: Pine Island
- Location in Nassau County and the state of New York

- Location on Long Island Location within the state of New York.
- Coordinates: 40°54′26″N 73°33′26″W
- Country: United States
- State: New York
- County: Nassau
- Town: Oyster Bay
- Incorporated: 1919

Government
  - Type: Board of Trustees
  - Mayor: Paul Rupp; Steve Minicozzi (T)
  - Board of Trustees: Members' List: • Robert M. Nigro (Taxpayers Party of Bayville [T]); • David W. Wright (T); • Patricia Farnell (T); • Valerie M. Belchner (T); • Peter B. Valsecchi (T); • Elisa Santoro (T); • Nicoleta Jakab (Pine Island Estate Successor)

Area
  - Total: 1.55 sq mi (4.02 km^{2})
  - Land: 1.46 sq mi (3.77 km^{2})
  - Water: 0.097 sq mi (0.25 km^{2})
- Elevation: 39 ft (12 m)

Population (2020)
  - Total: 6,748
  - Density: 4,636.2/sq mi (1,790.05/km^{2})
- Time zone: UTC-5 (Eastern (EST))
  - Summer (DST): UTC-4 (EDT)
- ZIP code: 11709
- Area codes: 516, 363
- FIPS code: 36-05034
- GNIS feature ID: 0943216
- Website: bayvilleny.gov

Bayville (sometimes also referred to as Pine Island) is a village located in the Town of Oyster Bay in Nassau County, on the North Shore of Long Island, in New York, United States. The population was 6,748 at the time of the 2020 census.

The Incorporated Village of Bayville is located on the Long Island Sound, facing Greenwich, Connecticut.

== History ==
Bayville incorporated as a village in 1919, during the "incorporated village movement," which allowed many larger estate owners on Long Island to establish political and security control over their domains.

Like many other Long Island communities, Bayville was first occupied by the Matinecock Indians and was known as Oak Neck and Pine Island. In 1658, Oyster Bay resident Daniel Whitehead purchased the land from the tribes. By 1745, the land was split among 23 men, who mainly grew asparagus. In 1859, Oak Neck was renamed Bayville and the first Methodist church was constructed west of what is now Merritt Lane. Multiple estates were built in the surrounding areas, and in 1898 a drawbridge was built, connecting Bayville and Mill Neck.

In 1909, the Bayville Casino opened for business, attracting beachgoers, and in 1919, Winslow S. Pierce, who owned the Dunstable Estate in town, was elected the first mayor of the Village of Bayville. The Dunstable Estate was sold to Harrison Williams and renamed "Oak Point". When the Arlington Hotel, Bayville Casino, and Ritzmore Estate burned to the ground, it prompted the creation of the Bayville Fire Department. Bayville was put on the front page of many newspapers in 1927 when the rum rummer William T. Bell ran ashore at the Oak Point estate. Things were a little slow for a while, but after World War II, the community began to boom. A new church, post office, and school were built in the span of three years, and from 1950 to 1960, the population doubled.

The Bayville Bridge – one of two entrances into the village – opened in 1938 and is a major landmark and tourist attraction; it is the fourth bridge at that location.

The village celebrated its centennial in 2019.

== Geography ==
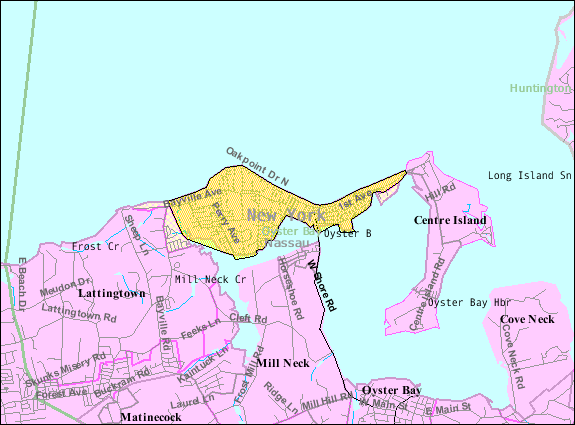
U.S. Census map of Bayville.

According to the United States Census Bureau, the village has a total area of 1.5 square miles (3.9 km^{2}), of which 1.4 square miles (3.6 km^{2}) is land and 0.1 square miles (0.26 km^{2}), or 3.42%, is water.

== Demographics ==
Historical population
Census	Pop.	Note	%±
1930	1,042		—
1940	1,516		45.5%
1950	1,981		30.7%
1960	3,962		100.0%
1970	6,147		55.1%
1980	7,034		14.4%
1990	7,193		2.3%
2000	7,135		−0.8%
2010	6,669		−6.5%
2020	6,748		1.2%
U.S. Decennial Census

=== Racial and ethnic composition ===
Bayville village, New York – Racial and ethnic composition Note: the US Census treats Hispanic/Latino as an ethnic category. This table excludes Latinos from the racial categories and assigns them to a separate category. Hispanics/Latinos may be of any race.
Race / Ethnicity (NH = Non-Hispanic)	Pop 2000	Pop 2010	Pop 2020	% 2000	% 2010	% 2020
White alone (NH)	6,607	6,013	5,691	92.60%	90.16%	84.34%
Black or African American alone (NH)	20	18	32	0.28%	0.27%	0.47%
Native American or Alaska Native alone (NH)	7	16	3	0.10%	0.24%	0.04%
Asian alone (NH)	117	112	140	1.64%	1.68%	2.07%
Native Hawaiian or Pacific Islander alone (NH)	0	0	1	0.00%	0.00%	0.01%
Other race alone (NH)	7	9	21	0.10%	0.13%	0.31%
Mixed race or Multiracial (NH)	33	68	156	0.46%	1.02%	2.31%
Hispanic or Latino (any race)	344	433	704	4.82%	6.49%	10.43%
Total	7,135	6,669	6,748	100.00%	100.00%	100.00%

=== 2020 census ===
As of the 2020 census, Bayville had a population of 6,748. The median age was 47.9 years. 18.3% of residents were under the age of 18 and 21.3% of residents were 65 years of age or older. For every 100 females there were 97.6 males, and for every 100 females age 18 and over there were 95.6 males age 18 and over.

100.0% of residents lived in urban areas, while 0.0% lived in rural areas.

There were 2,518 households in Bayville, of which 28.6% had children under the age of 18 living in them. Of all households, 57.5% were married-couple households, 15.2% were households with a male householder and no spouse or partner present, and 22.8% were households with a female householder and no spouse or partner present. About 22.1% of all households were made up of individuals and 11.6% had someone living alone who was 65 years of age or older.

There were 2,691 housing units, of which 6.4% were vacant. The homeowner vacancy rate was 1.0% and the rental vacancy rate was 5.0%.

=== 2000 census ===
As of the 2000 census, there were 7,135 people, 2,566 households, and 1,906 families residing in the village. The population density was 5,065.7 inhabitants per square mile (1,955.9/km^{2}). There were 2,683 housing units at an average density of 1,904.9 per square mile (735.5/km^{2}). The racial makeup of the village was 96.01% White, 0.31% African American, 0.24% Native American, 1.64% Asian, 1.08% from other races, and 0.73% from two or more races. Hispanic or Latino of any race were 4.82% of the population.

There were 2,566 households, out of which 33.6% had children under the age of 18 living with them, 61.1% were married couples living together, 9.7% had a female householder with no husband present, and 25.7% were non-families. 20.6% of all households were made up of individuals, and 7.6% had someone living alone who was 65 years of age or older. The average household size was 2.74 and the average family size was 3.20.

In the village, the population was spread out, with 23.6% under the age of 18, 5.9% from 18 to 24, 29.6% from 25 to 44, 27.5% from 45 to 64, and 13.4% who were 65 years of age or older. The median age was 40 years. For every 100 females, there were 95.9 males. For every 100 females age 18 and over, there were 95.0 males.

The median income for a household in the village was $68,380, and the median income for a family was $77,838. Males had a median income of $50,969 versus $38,304 for females. The per capita income for the village was $33,665. About 2.7% of families and 4.7% of the population were below the poverty line, including 3.7% of those under age 18 and 8.3% of those age 65 or over.

== Government ==
Bayville (historically also associated with Pine Island) is a village in the Town of Oyster Bay, in Nassau County, New York, on the North Shore of Long Island. The village lies along the Long Island Sound opposite Greenwich, Connecticut, and includes historically distinct areas and waterfront communities associated with Pine Island and Oak Neck.

== History ==
The area now comprising Bayville developed from a number of historic estates, waterfront tracts, farms, and subdivisions along the Long Island Sound. development of Pine Island and adjoining portions of Bayville.

=== Oak Neck and the waterfront ===
Bayville's historic development also included the Oak Neck area and other waterfront tracts along the Long Island Sound. Historic plats and property maps document roads, beaches, estates, and shoreline parcels extending toward Centre Island, reflecting the village's longstanding relationship with private waterfront development, boating, beach access, and summer communities.

== Education ==
Bayville is located within the boundaries of – and is thus served by – the Locust Valley Central School District.

== In Popular Culture ==
In The Wolf of Wall Street (2013 film), the Bahamas wedding was filmed at the Crescent Beach Club.

== Notable people ==
- Frank Brickowski, former NBA player
- Jackie Martling, former writer for The Howard Stern Show
- Rick Pitino, former NBA and NCAA basketball coach
- Harrison Williams, 20th-century entrepreneur, investor and multi-millionaire
