= 103rd Illinois Infantry Regiment =

103rd Illinois Volunteer Infantry Regiment
- State Flag of Illinois
- Active: October 2, 1862, to June 21, 1865
- Country: United States
- Allegiance: Union
- Branch: Infantry
- Engagements: Siege of Vicksburg Chattanooga campaign Battle of Kennesaw Mountain; Battle of Atlanta; Battle of Jonesborough; March to the Sea; Battle of Griswoldville Carolinas campaign

Commanders
- October 2, 1862 to October 18, 1862: Colonel Amos C. Babcock
- October 18, 1862 to May 28, 1864: Colonel Willard A. Dickerman
- May 28, 1864 to June 21, 1865: Colonel George W. Wright

The 103rd Illinois Volunteer Infantry Regiment was an infantry regiment that served for three years during the American Civil War. Organized in Peoria, Illinois, and formed from men entirely within Fulton County, Illinois, the group left Illinois, serving with Sherman through the Atlanta Campaign, March to the Sea and Carolina Campaign. Finally, the regiment participated in the troop review in Washington, D.C., before mustering out in Chicago, and traveling back to their homes.

== Service ==
The regiment was formed entirely with men from Fulton County, Illinois, and was called up as part of the recruitment drive during the summer and fall of 1862 after a series of Union setbacks. The men were organized and trained in Peoria, Illinois, before being mustered into service on October 2, 1862, with a strength of 804 men. Many of the officers were veterans of early battles in the war; most had come from the 17th Illinois Infantry Regiment. The Adjutant General's Report of 1901 notes that due to the experience of the veteran officers, heavy emphasis was placed on training. Training took place in Peoria for a month before they boarded trains and headed south to Cairo, Illinois

The 103rd Illinois was to join Major General Ulysses S. Grant's army in west Tennessee, attached to the XIII Corps. They participated in operations in Tennessee and northern Mississippi in late 1862 and early 1863. With the dawn of 1863 in the war's western front, the emphasis was Vicksburg, Mississippi. The strategy was to completely take control of the Mississippi River, thereby cutting the nation in two; this effectively would eliminate the west to east transportation of troops and supplies from locations like Texas. Starting this new phase, the regiment was attached to the XVI Corps in a brigade commanded by Stephen G. Hicks. While the vast majority of the Army of the Tennessee participated in operations against Vicksburg, the 103rd Illinois remained in La Grange, Tennessee, protecting the Union supply lines into northern Mississippi. In this capacity, they helped provide support from Grierson's Raid in April 1863. By June the regiment was sent to the Yazoo River and temporarily attached the IX Corps. They participated in the fortification of Snyder's Bluff, helping to guard the army's rear from attacks by Confederate forces. After the surrender of Vicksburg on July 4, the 103rd was assigned to the XV Corps under Major General William T. Sherman. They participated in a foray to the Mississippi capital of Jackson and spent the rest of the summer in and around Vicksburg.

With the Army of the Cumberland trapped at Chattanooga, Tennessee, Sherman led the XV Corps to their relief. The 103rd left Vicksburg on September 28 traveling north to Memphis, then continuing overland to Chattanooga. They crossed the Tennessee River with the rest of the XV Corps on November 24 and participated in the attack on Goat Hill at the north end of Missionary Ridge. Although the men of the 103rd had been in the army for over a year, this was their first major engagement with the enemy. The next day, November 25, the regiment took part in the assault on Tunnel Hill, Georgia. The Federals endured withering fire from Confederates under Major General Patrick R. Cleburne, who were strongly entrenched on the hill. The men of the 103rd got within a few yards of the enemy breastworks, but the fire from the enemy was so strong they could not break the enemy line and were ordered to withdraw. During their baptism of fire, the regiment lost one officer and twenty-four men killed, and sixty-three men wounded (37% of those engaged). Fortunately for the Federals, the center of the Confederate line on Missionary Ridge collapsed and the battle was won.

The 103rd with the rest of Sherman's command continued westward after the Battle of Chattanooga to relieve General Ambrose Burnside, whose army was besieged by Confederate general James Longstreet at Knoxville. Finding that Longstreet had already given up on the siege by the time they arrived in Knoxville, Sherman returned to Chattanooga. During the winter of 1863-1864, the 103rd spent time in winter quarters and guard duty in Cleveland, Tennessee. They rejoined the XV Corps just in time to participate in the Atlanta campaign beginning on May 3, 1864. They were lightly engaged at the Battle of Resaca on May 14, losing one man killed and several wounded and participated heavily in the Battle of Dallas two weeks later. Among the slain was the regimental commander, Colonel Willard A. Dickerman who was mortally wounded.

On June 27 the regiment participated in the disastrous assault on Kennesaw Mountain. Wave after wave of Federal attackers were turned back by Confederates occupying a strongly entrenched position on the mountain. This bloody and futile battle cost the 103rd three officers killed and four wounded, as well as nineteen enlisted men killed and a large number of wounded. By mid-July Sherman's army was at Atlanta and the men of the 103rd endured a massive counterattack by General John Bell Hood's Rebels on July 22. This attack was repulsed and the 103rd took position in the earthworks around Atlanta until August 25 when they were pulled out to participate in the destruction of the Atlanta and West Point Railroad and the Battle of Jonesborough on September 1. Atlanta fell into Union hands the following day. Taking a position six miles south of Atlanta on September 5, a veteran remembered that here they "took our first night's rest since May 11 without the rebel guns to lull us to sleep." On November 16 they, along with the rest of the Army of the Tennessee, began the March to the Sea, arriving in Savannah, Georgia, on December 21.

In mid-January they started northward to participate in the Carolinas campaign. The procession through South Carolina culminated with the taking of the capital city of Columbia. A lot of anger with the state that began the stream of the state successions have been reported, however, much of this is due to the writings of Edward Alfred Pollard, particularly The Lost Cause: A New Southern History of the War of the Confederates. A strong sense of pride by southerns wanted to demonstrate the wrongdoings of the north, showing evidence where none existed or was grossly exaggerated. The culmination of the South Carolina battles ended with the burning of Columbia. By the time Sherman's army moved into North Carolina, the mood had swung within both the Union and Confederate armies. General Robert E. Lee had surrendered at Appomattox Courthouse, and the feeling of a northern victory was at hand. Correspondence between Generals William Tecumseh Sherman and Joseph E. Johnston were taking place culminating in the surrender of all Confederate armies at Bennett Place. The 103rd was present for the stacking of arms at Durham Station, North Carolina, on April 26, 1865.

After the surrender, the 103rd Illinois, along with the rest of Sherman's Army, marched northward, passing through the former Confederate capital city of Richmond and arriving at Washington City around May 20, 1865. They participated in the Grand Review of the Armies on May 24, then traveled down the Ohio River to Louisville. Here the regiment was mustered out on June 21 and ordered to Chicago for final pay and discharge.

== Casualties ==
Killed and mortally wounded—81; Killed by accident—2; Died of disease—129; Died while prisoner of war—7; Total deaths—219; Discharged due to wounds or disease—134

== Commanders ==
=== Colonel Amos C. Babcock ===
October 2, 1862, to October 18, 1862

Amos C. Babcock, while elected to Colonel and the position of Regimental Commander, never was mustered in to the unit. Babcock was instrumental in the organization and recruitment of a regiment. He and several other influential men of the county, went to the Governor, promising to recruit enough men for a regiment consisting of entirely Fulton County men. When the task seemed to fall short, the Governor offered up two companies of men outside the county. By the deadline, however, the recruitment drive was successful, mustering in ten companies to make up the Regiment.

=== Colonel Willard A. Dickerman ===
October 18, 1862, to May 28, 1864

Willard A. Dickerman was elected to the position of quartermaster. On October 18, 1862, he assumed command of the regiment. During the battle near Dallas, Georgia, two were killed and thirty-five were wounded on May 28, 1864, including Dickerman. Nearing the end of the battle, Dickerman received his wound, that would take his life two days later.

=== Colonel George W. Wright ===
May 28, 1864, to June 21, 1865

== See also ==
- List of Illinois Civil War Units
