= American Center for Art and Culture =

Institution in Paris (1986–2022)

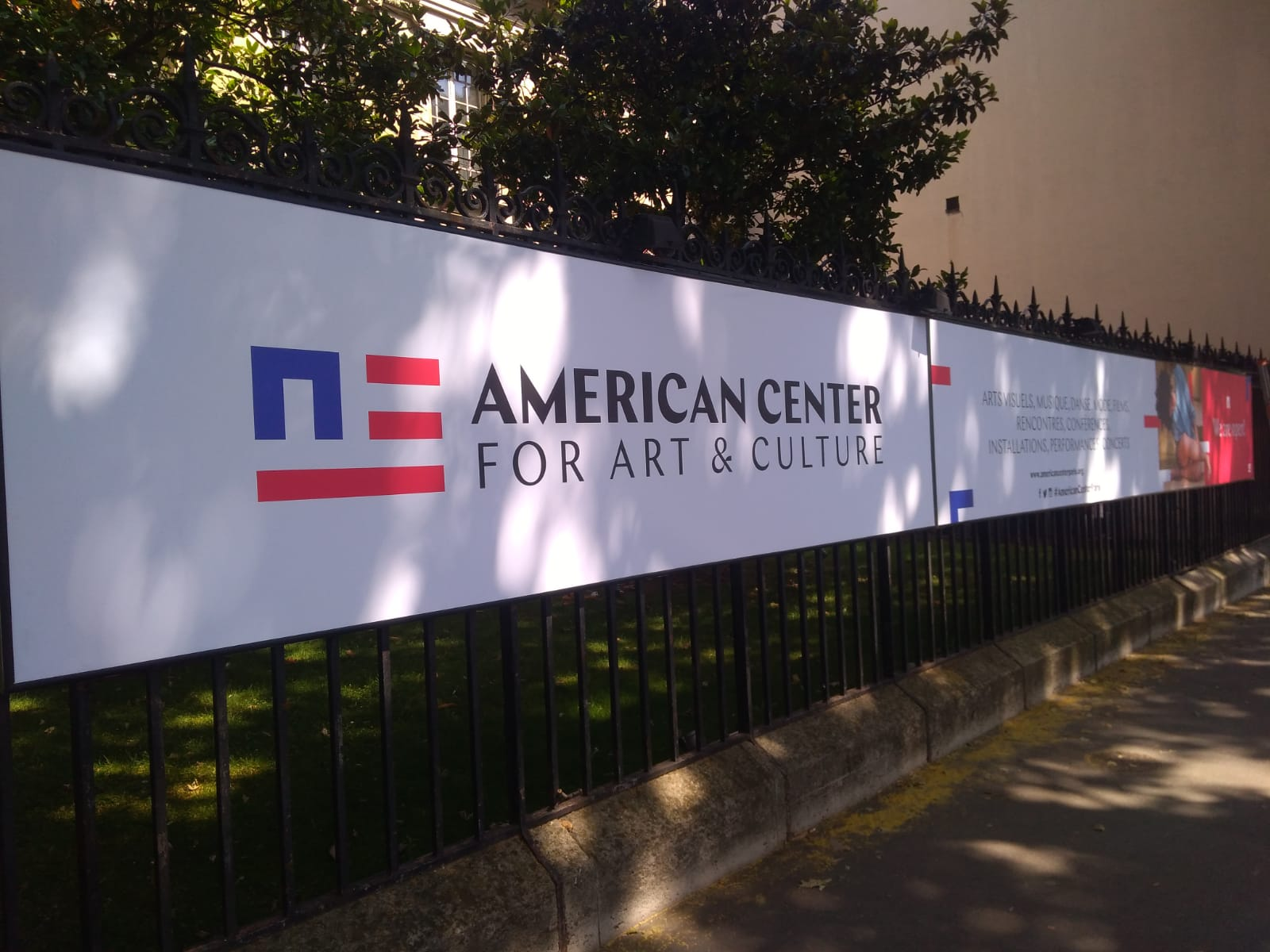

- Location in Paris
- Former name: Mona Bismarck American Center
- Established: 1986
- Dissolved: 12 December 2022
- Location: 34 Avenue de New York; 75116 Paris, France
- Coordinates: 48.863107°N 2.294819°E
- Presidents: Karen Altuzarra (U.S.); Anne-Hélène Monsellato (France)
- Public transit access: Iéna or Alma–Marceau
- Website: americancenterparis.org

The American Center for Art and Culture, formerly known as the Mona Bismarck American Center, was a cultural institution in Paris, France, that was active from 1986 to 2022. It was dedicated to the presentation of American creation and culture.

The center was launched in 2011, based on the legacy of the Mona Bismarck Foundation, which was established in 1986 following the death of its founder and sole benefactor, Countess Mona von Bismarck. She was an American philanthropist who donated her Parisian townhouse and the majority of her estate to found the Mona Bismarck Foundation, as "her desire was to establish a Cultural Centre in Paris to enhance the cause of American/French friendship upon her death".

On 4 July 2019, the Mona Bismarck American Center became the American Center for Art and Culture. On 12 December 2022, it was announced that the center was selling the property, with proceeds going to the American Library in Paris. Photographs and photograph albums from the Center joined the rest of Mona Bismarck's collection at the Filson Historical Society in Louisville, Kentucky.

== History ==
=== The Center ===
Located near the Seine, across from the Eiffel Tower, the hôtel particulier (French for 'townhouse') at 34 Avenue de New York was built at the end of the 19th century. The building was featured in a 1928 issue of Vogue. It was reconfigured for Mona Bismarck during the late 1950s by French interior decorator Stéphane Boudin.

== Programming ==
=== Exhibitions ===
One exhibition of American art was presented each year, in partnership with international institutions. Exhibitions focused on a single artist or theme and represented a range of artistic styles and movements.

Notable exhibitions

- The Wyeths: Three Generations of American Art (November 10, 2011 – February 12, 2012)
- Mary Cassatt in Paris: Prints and Drawings from the Ambroise Vollard Collection (September 26, 2012 – January 20, 2013)
- Quilt Art: Patchwork Art (February 13 – May 19, 2013)
- Little Black Dress (July 3 – September 22, 2013)
- Yousuf Karsh: Icons of the 20th Century (October 16, 2013 – January 26, 2014)
- Wasteland: New Art from Los Angeles (March, 12 – July 17, 2016)
- Landscape with a Ruin – Evan Roth (October 2017 – November 2017)

Exhibition samples

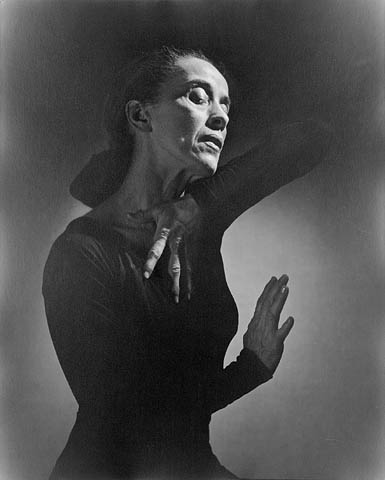
Yousuf Karsh, Martha Graham, 1948

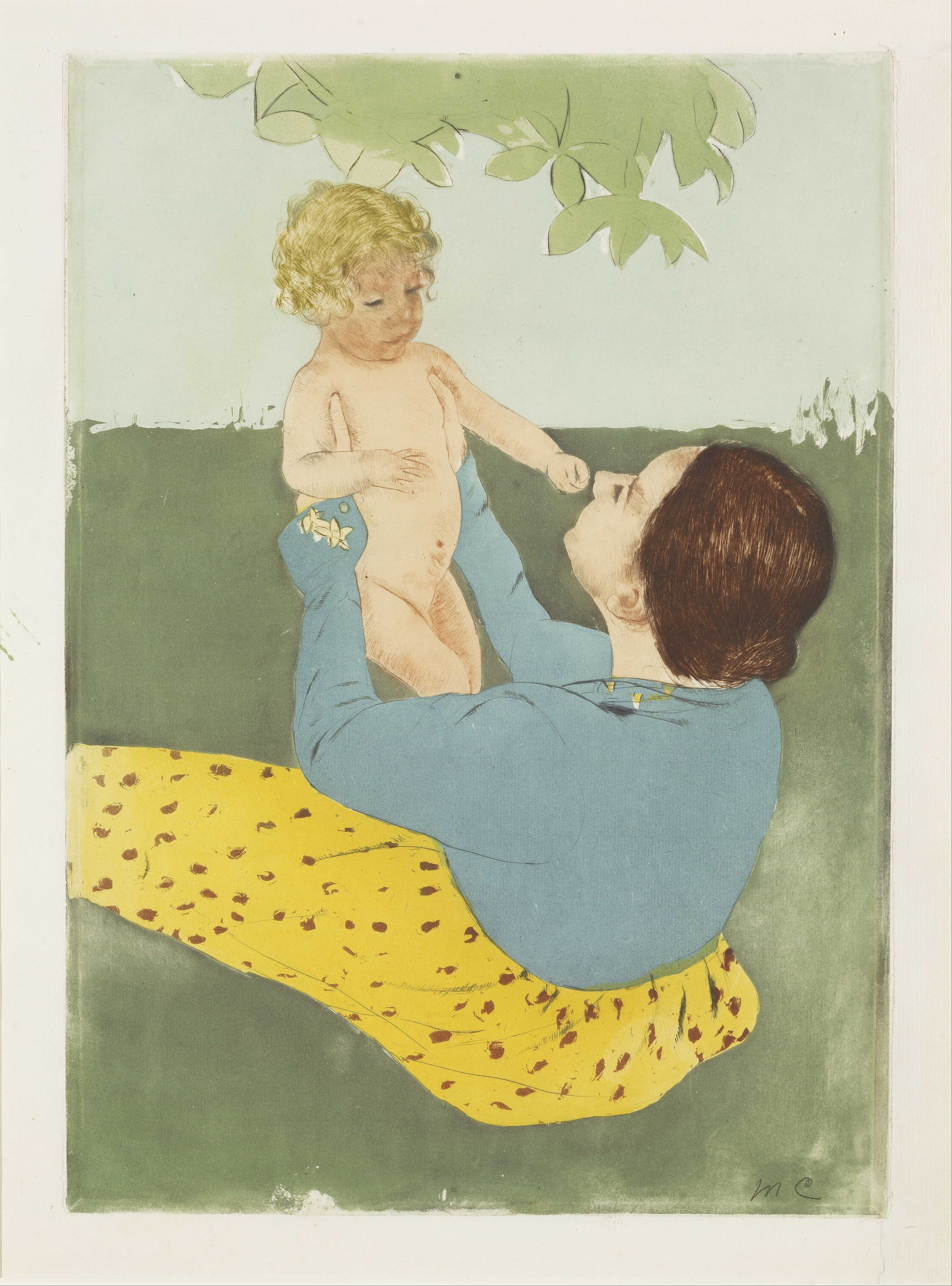
Mary Cassatt, Under the Horse-Chestnut Tree, 1896-1897

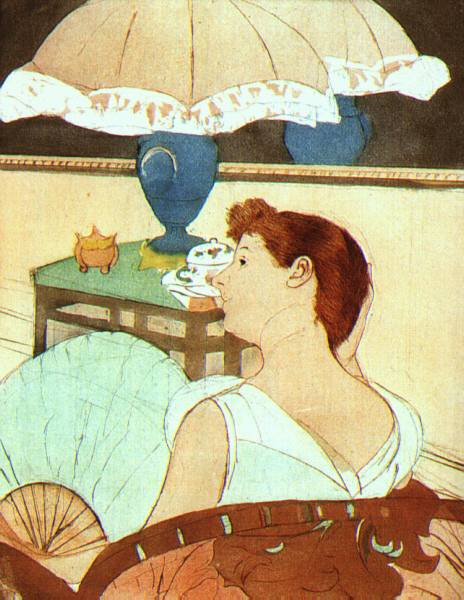
Mary Cassatt, The Lamp, 1890-1891

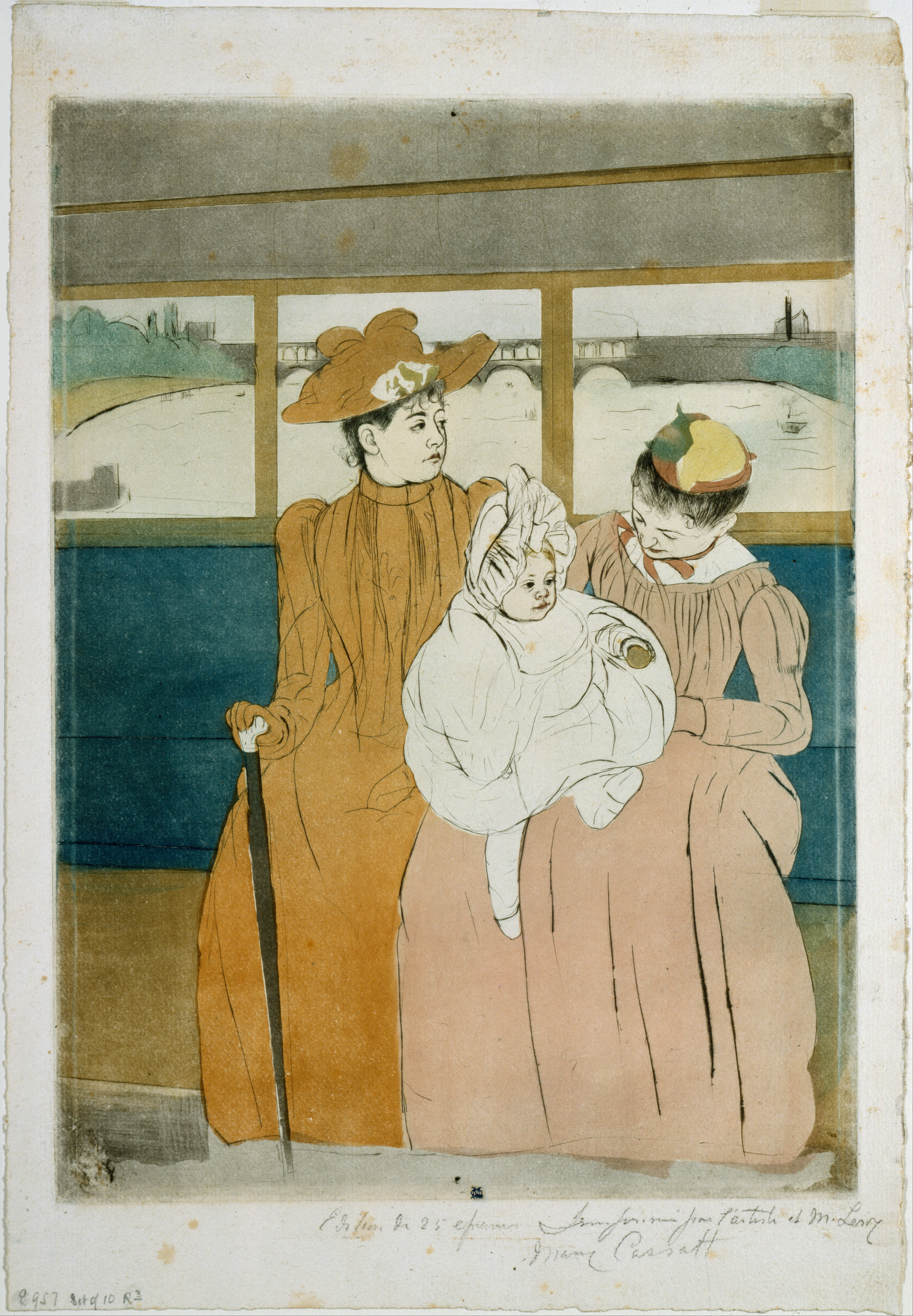
Mary Cassatt, In the Omnibus, 1890-1891

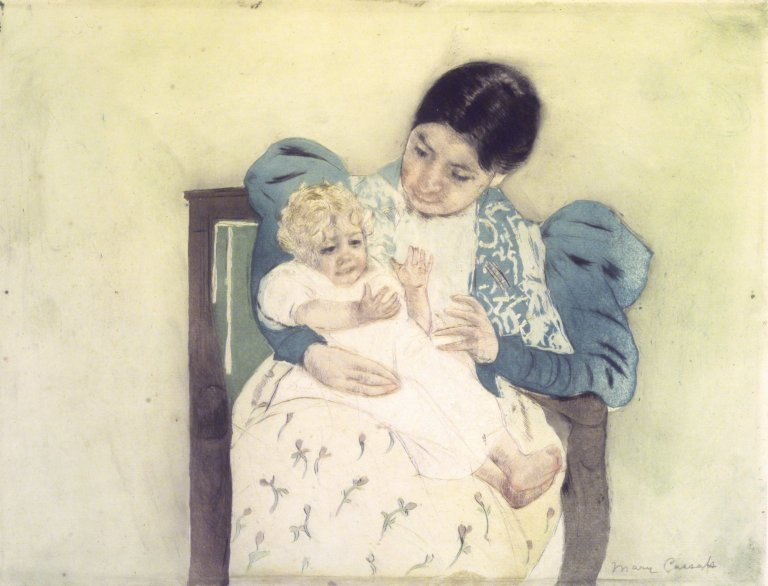
Mary Cassatt, The Barefooted Child, 1896-1897

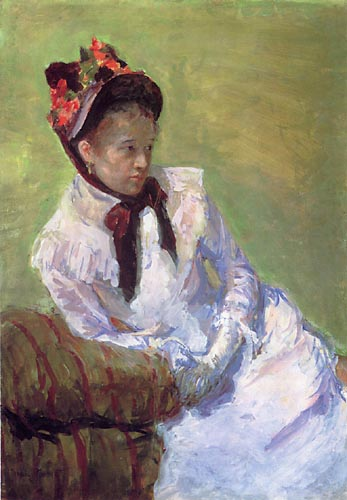
Mary Cassatt, Portrait of the Artist, 1878

=== Public programs ===
The American Center for Art and Culture invited the public to discover American culture through a program of concerts, performances and discussions. The center was also often rented out for private events at night.

=== Education ===
The program Look & Learn aimed to broaden French students' appreciation of American culture and art while creating a friendly environment where students could feel comfortable expressing themselves in English.

== Gallery ==
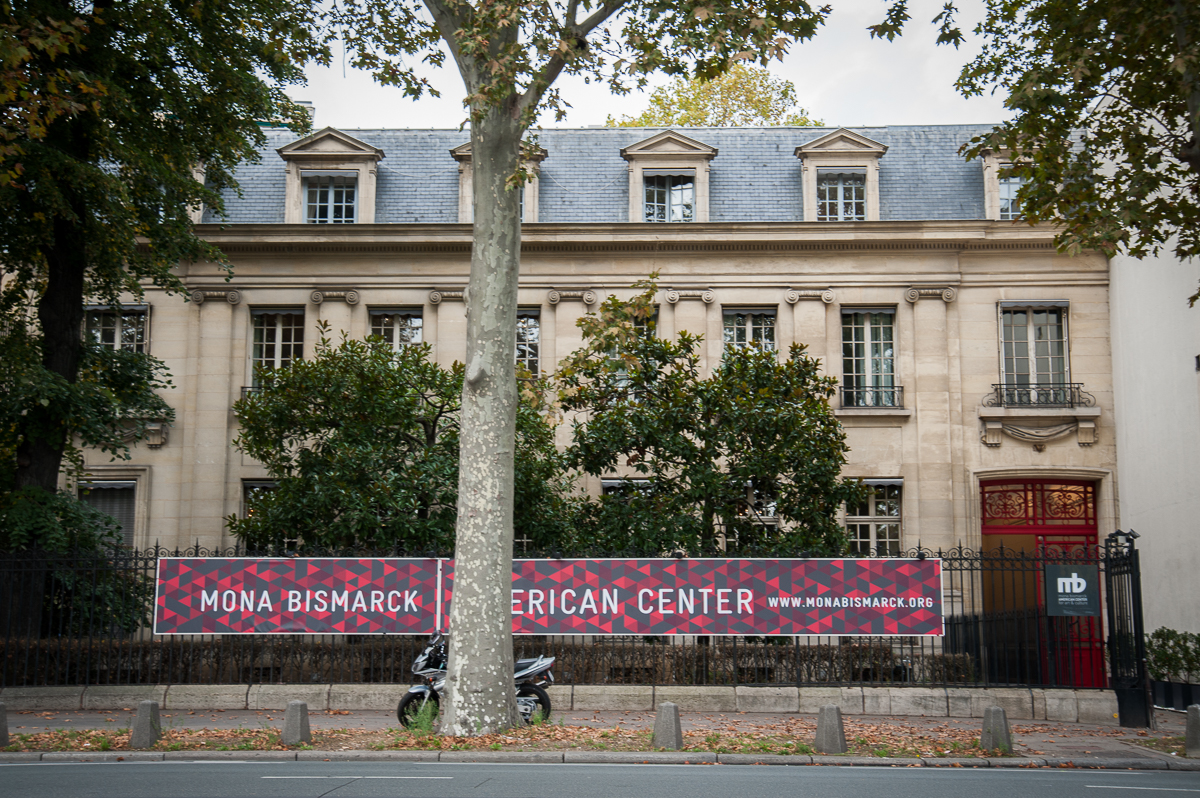
Exterior of the building

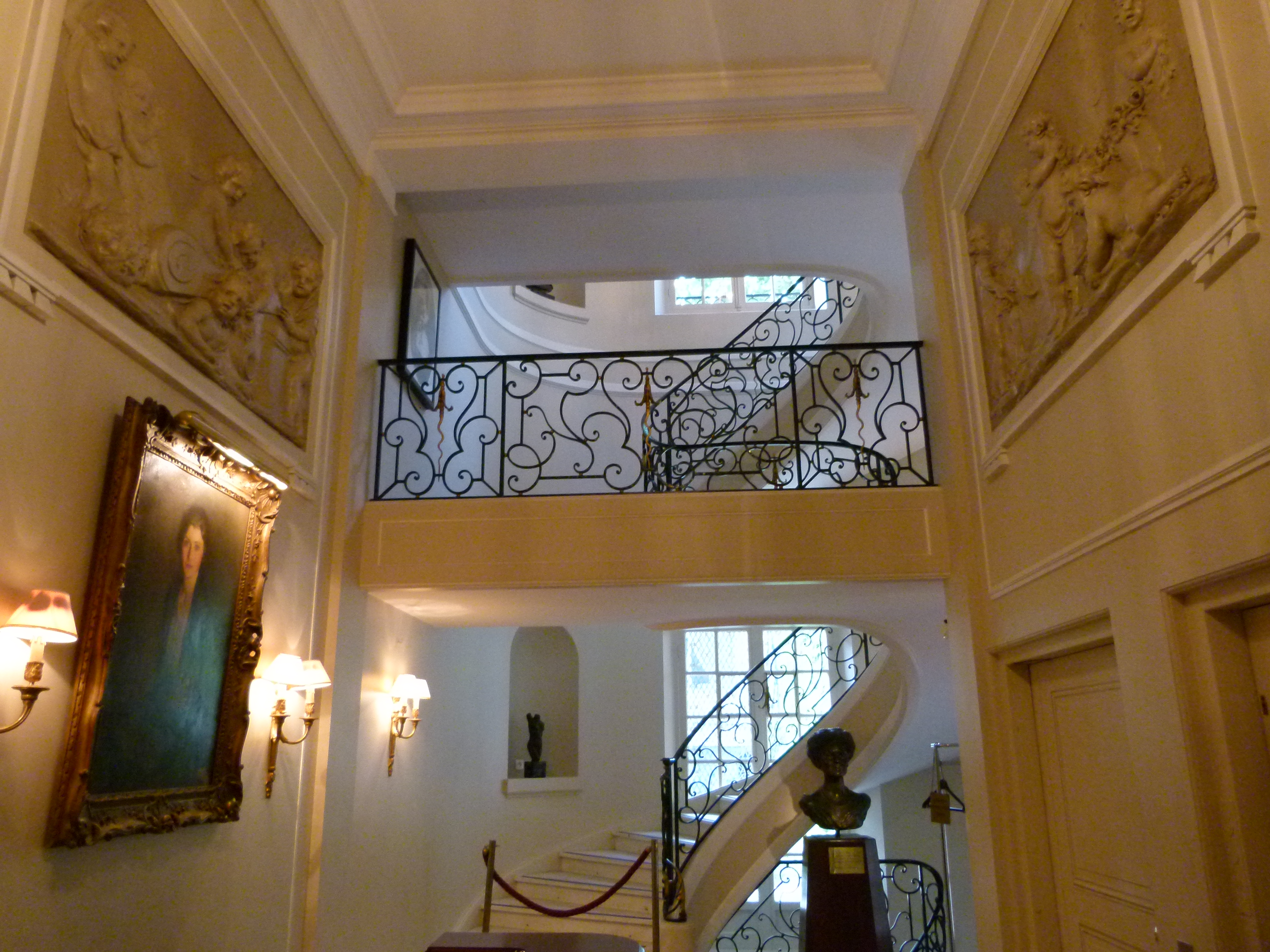
Interior lobby

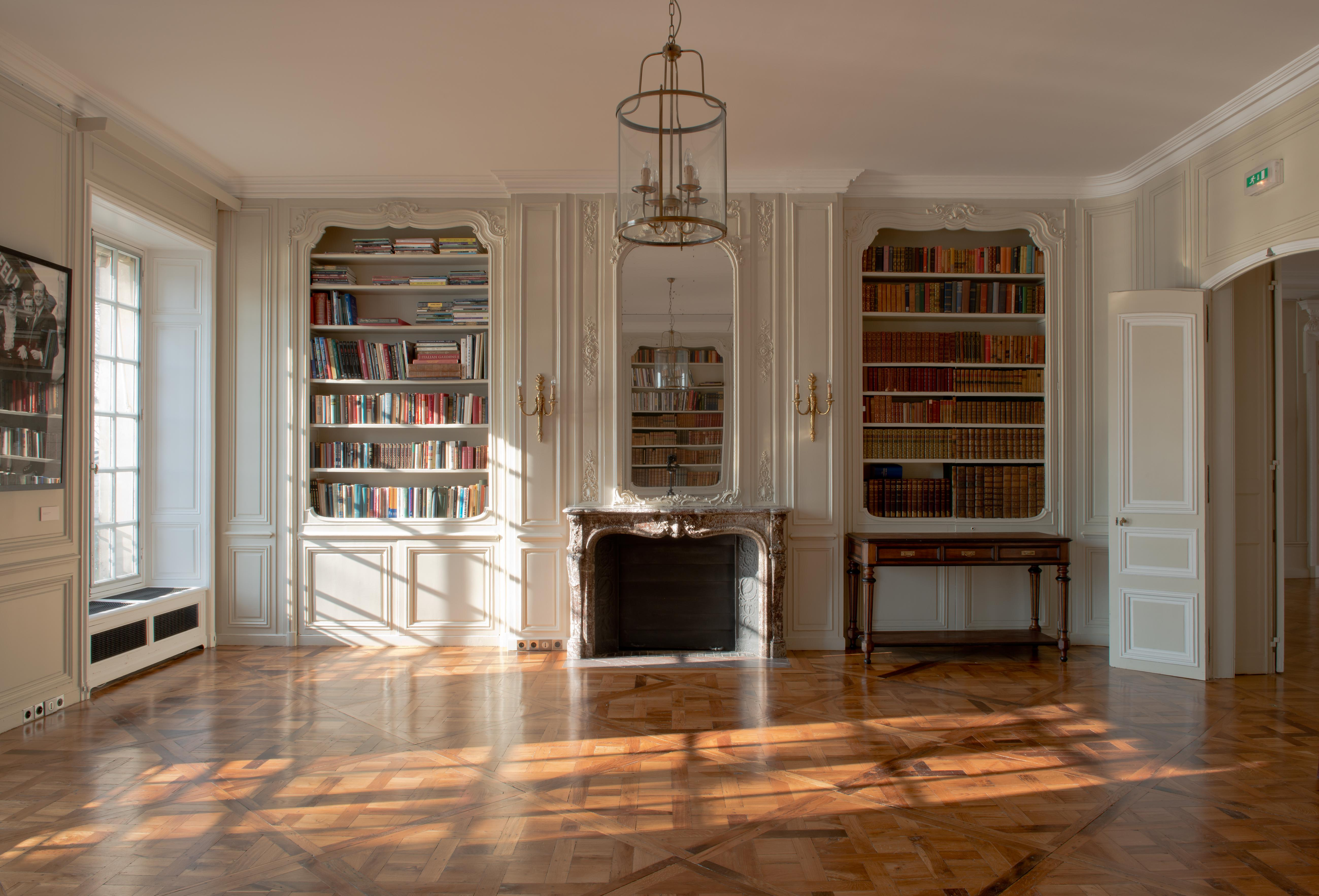
Library

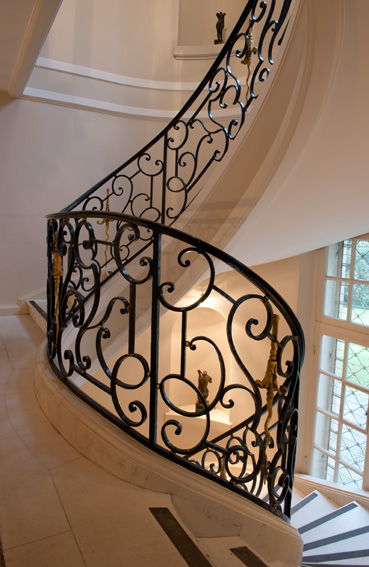
Stairway

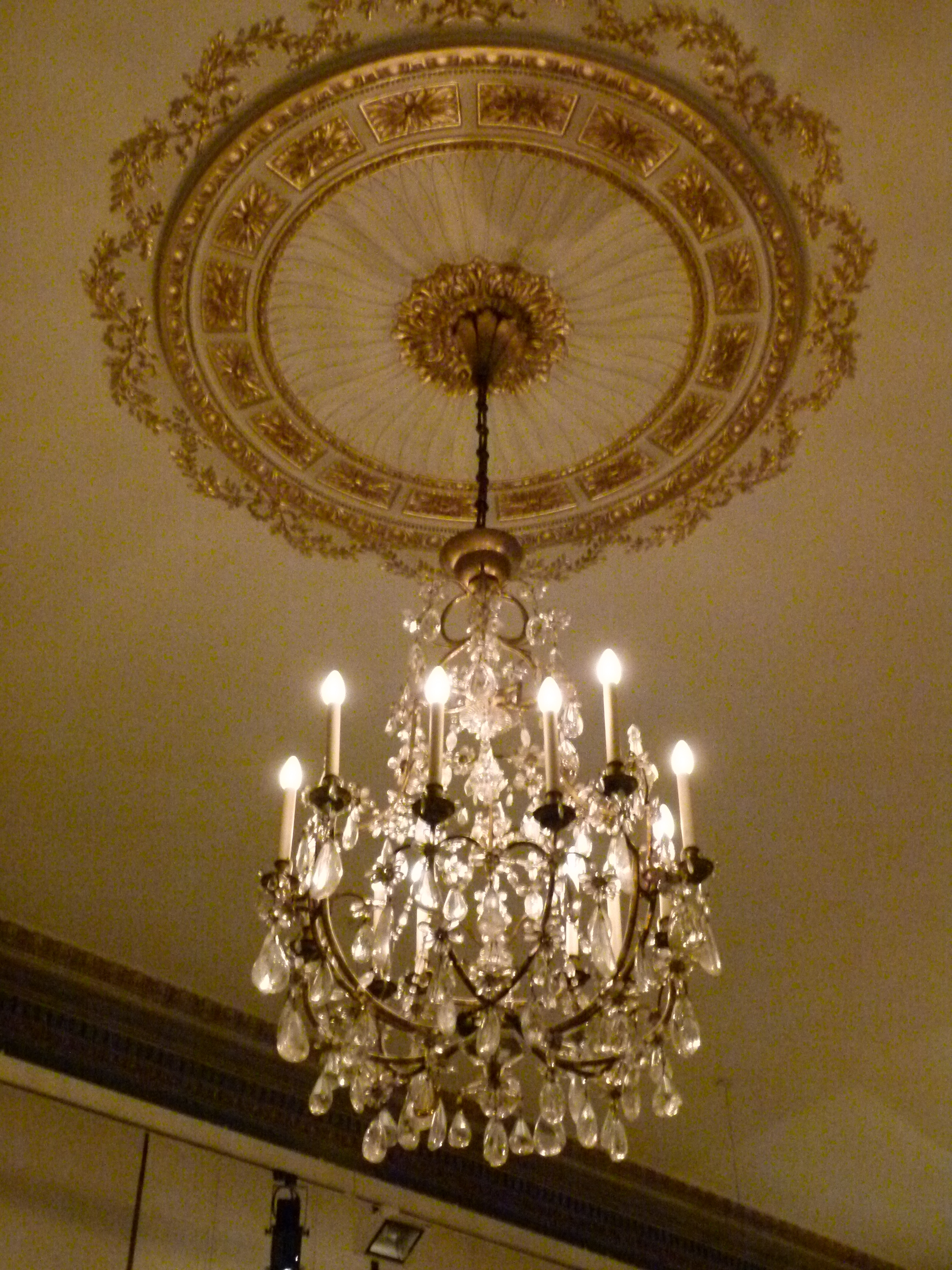
Detail of chandelier
