= Willard Dickerman Straight =

American financier, publisher, and diplomat (1880–1918)

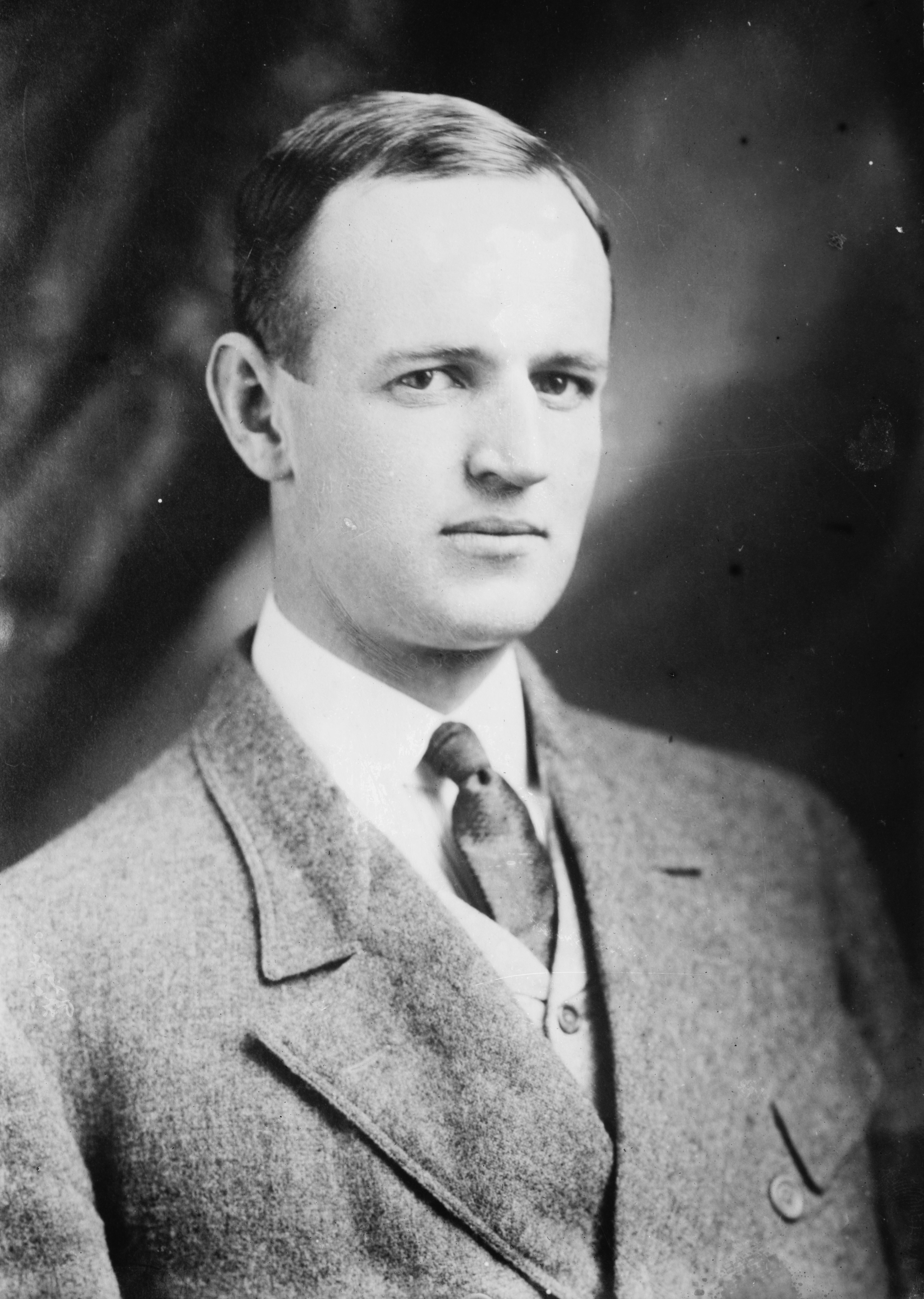
- Born: January 31, 1880; Oswego, New York, US
- Died: December 1, 1918 (aged 38); Paris, France
- Resting place: Suresnes American Cemetery and Memorial
- Education: Bordentown Military Institute; Cornell University (1901)
- Spouse: Dorothy Payne Whitney (m. 1911)
- Children: Whitney Willard Straight; Beatrice Whitney Straight; Michael Whitney Straight
- Parent(s): Henry H. Straight; Emma Dickerman
- Military career
- Allegiance: United States
- Branch: United States Army
- Service years: 1917–1918
- Rank: Major

Willard Dickerman Straight (January 31, 1880 – December 1, 1918) was an American investment banker, publisher, reporter, diplomat and by marriage, a member of the Whitney family. He was a promoter of Chinese arts and investments, and a major supporter of liberal causes.

== Early life ==
Straight was born on January 31, 1880, in Oswego, New York, the son of two Yankee missionaries to China and Japan, Henry H. Straight (1846-1886) and née Emma Dickerman (1850–1890). Emma was described as an artist who "loved poetry, pictures — beauty in all its forms — but above all else, people." His parents were faculty members at Oswego Normal School. Straight was orphaned at age ten, by the death of his father in 1886 and his mother in 1890. Willard and his sister were taken in by Dr. Elvire Ranier, one of the earliest woman physicians in the country. He attended Bordentown Military Institute in New Jersey, and in 1897 he enrolled at Cornell University in Ithaca, New York, and graduated in 1901 with a degree in architecture. At Cornell, he joined Delta Tau Delta, edited and contributed to several publications, and helped to organize Dragon Day, an annual architecture students' event. He was also elected to the Sphinx Head Society, membership in which was reserved for the most respected men of the senior class.

== Career ==
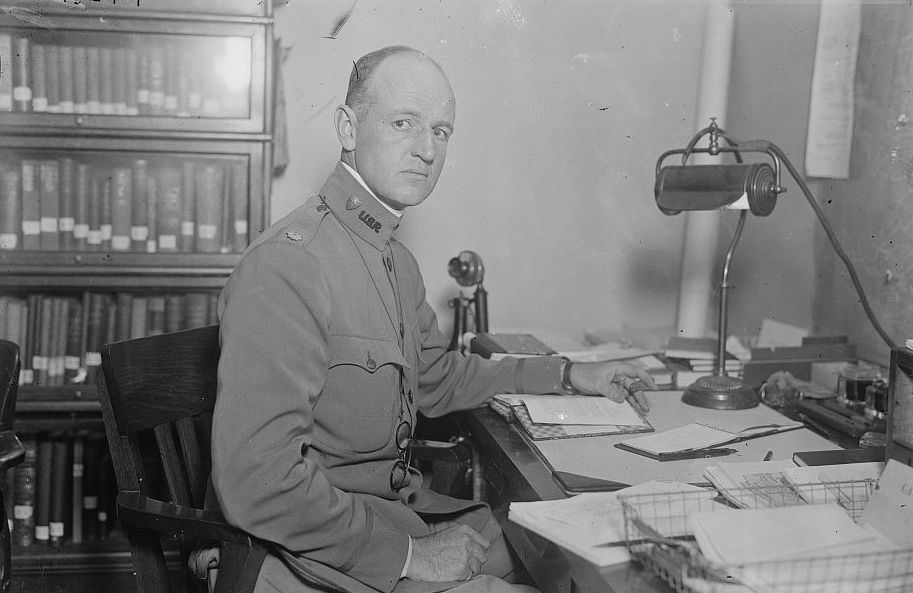
Straight in military uniform in 1917

After graduation from Cornell, Straight was hired by the Imperial Chinese Maritime Customs Service, an agency of the Chinese government. He served as secretary to Sir Robert Hart, the Service's head, in Nanjing. While in the Far East, he worked as a Reuters correspondent during the Russo-Japanese War, bringing him to Korea in 1904. In June 1905, he became vice consul under Edwin V. Morgan, the American consul general in the Kingdom of Korea.

In 1906, after briefly working in Havana, Cuba, he returned to China as American Consul-General at Mukden, Manchuria. While there, he and Ms. Mary Harriman were reportedly romantically involved, but their marriage was prevented by E. H. Harriman, her wealthy father. He then went on to work for J. P. Morgan & Co.

Straight married heiress Dorothy Payne Whitney in 1911.

In 1914, Willard and Dorothy, together with Herbert Croly, began publication of The New Republic, a weekly political magazine that quickly became the voice of American liberalism. In 1917, they helped found Asia Magazine, a prominent academic journal on China.

In 1915, Straight left J.P. Morgan and went to work as a vice-president for American International Corporation. In that same year, Straight became involved with the Preparedness Movement and attended the July 1915 Citizens' Military Training Camp in Plattsburgh, New York. When the United States entered World War I two years later, Straight joined the United States Army. He served stateside and later in France with the Adjutant General's Corps and First Army. For his service, he was awarded the Distinguished Service Medal and served as a major.

According to Eric Rauchway, Straight favored an American version of imperialism that was a liberal effort to take political control in Asia away from Britain, Russia, Japan, and other colonial powers and to put it in the hands of those more enlightened. Believing deeply in liberal doctrines about human nature, Straight believed American imperialism was the one best hope for the oppressed peoples of the world.

== Personal life ==
Memorial buildings

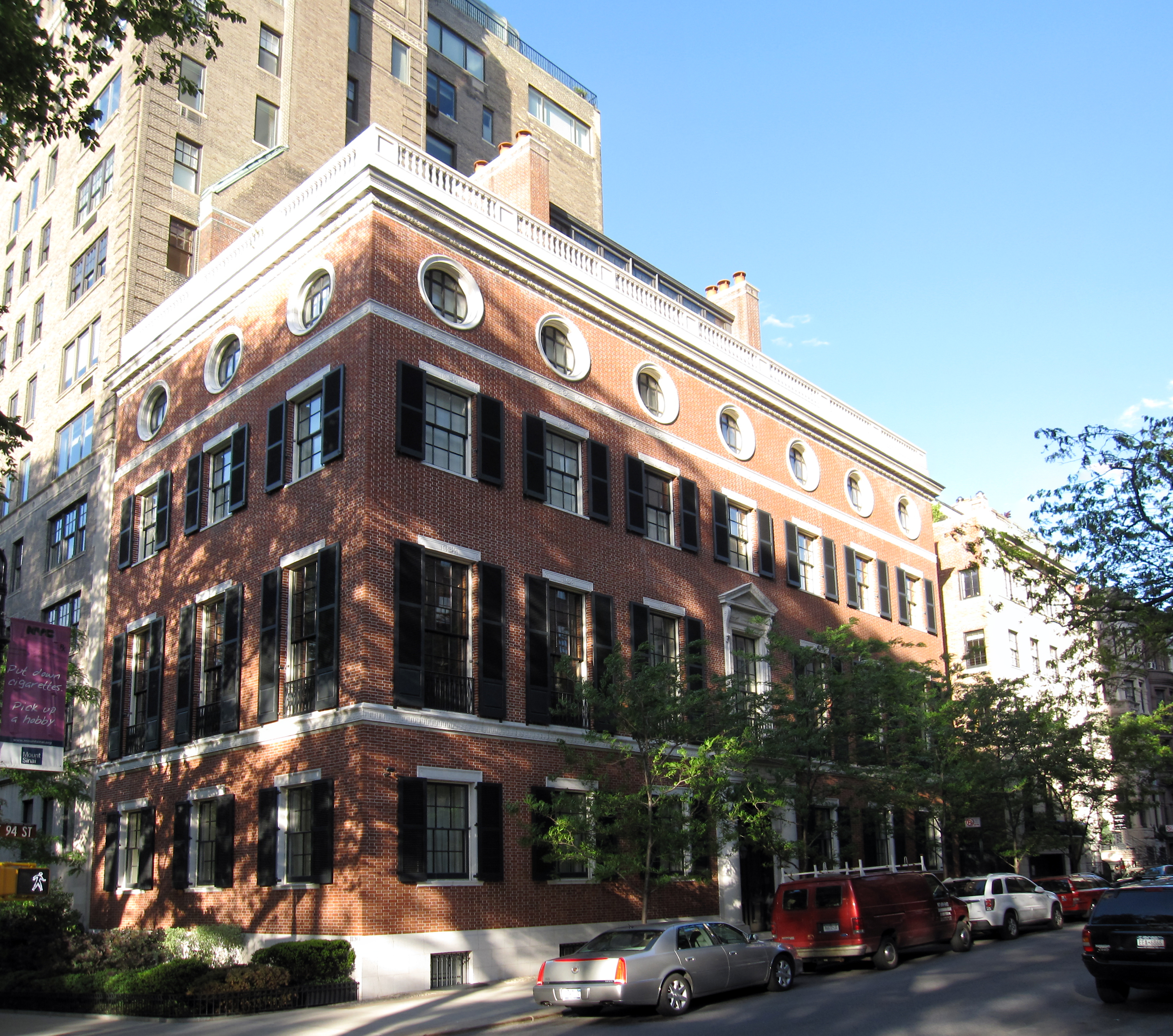
Willard D. Straight House in New York City

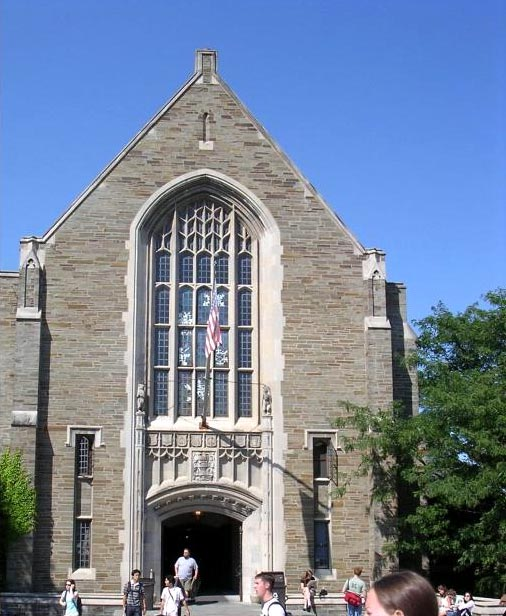
Willard Straight Hall at Cornell University

Straight was romantically involved with Ethel Roosevelt, daughter of U.S. President Theodore Roosevelt, according to the society pages of the times, but they broke up. He served as a trustee of Cornell University and a member of the Century Association and Knickerbocker Club.

In 1911, after five years of courtship, Straight married Dorothy Payne Whitney (1887–1968), a member of the prominent Whitney family, in Geneva, Switzerland. Her father was William Collins Whitney, the Secretary of the Navy during the first Cleveland administration, and her mother was Flora Payne, the daughter of Senator Henry B. Payne of Ohio. The Straights moved first to Beijing, then, having adjudged China too unsafe after the 1911 Revolution, back to the United States in 1912. Together, Willard and Dorothy had:

- Whitney Willard Straight (1912–1979)
- Beatrice Whitney Straight (1914–2001)
- Michael Whitney Straight (1916–2004)

On December 1, 1918, Straight died of pneumonia, a complication of the Spanish influenza, in Paris, where he was arranging the arrival of the American mission to the Paris Peace Conference. His body was buried in the American cemetery at Suresnes, outside of Paris.

=== Legacy ===
Following the death of Straight's good friend Henry Schoellkopf in 1912, Straight donated $100,000 (equivalent to $3,336,000 in 2025) to construct the Schoellkopf Memorial Hall in his honor. After his death, his wife made a substantial donation to Cornell to build the school's first student union building, Willard Straight Hall, which was named in his honor.

== See also ==
- Dollar diplomacy
