= Buzz Kulik =

American film director and producer (1922–1999)

- Born: Seymour Kulik; July 23, 1922; Kearny, New Jersey, U.S.
- Died: January 13, 1999 (aged 76); Los Angeles, California, U.S.
- Occupations: Film director, film producer
- Years active: 1949–1992

Seymour "Buzz" Kulik (July 23, 1922 – January 13, 1999) was an American film director and producer. He directed 72 films and television shows, including the landmark CBS television network anthology series Playhouse 90 and several episodes of The Twilight Zone. Kulik went on to direct made-for-TV movies, such as Brian's Song.

After leaving the army as a first lieutenant after World War II, Kulik went to work in the mail room at J. Walter Thompson Advertising Agency in New York. He eventually saw a notice at work that they were looking for people to direct programs for a new medium called television, and Kulik responded. A lifelong baseball fan, he started directing the cameras at Yankee Stadium before starting a career directing live television programming such as Playhouse 90 and Lux Video Theater. He moved to Los Angeles in 1953 and eventually began directing many popular series of the 1950s and 1960s including Perry Mason, Gunsmoke, Have Gun Will Travel, Wagon Train, Rawhide, Dr. Kildare and The Defenders (for which he directed the pilot episode). He directed a dozen episodes of The Twilight Zone, which made him recognisable among its fanbase

Kulik also began directing feature films in the 1960s including The Explosive Generation with William Shatner, Warning Shot with David Janssen, Villa Rides with Robert Mitchum, Yul Brynner, and Charles Bronson, and Riot with Gene Hackman and Jim Brown. He directed the first television mini-series, Vanished, with Richard Widmark and James Farentino. Of his 1960s films, critic Andrew Sarris in his 1968 study, The American Cinema: Directors and Directions, wrote that Kulik "reveals an interesting glimmer of intelligence in The Yellow Canary and Warning Shot. He is from television, perhaps too much so. Sergeant Ryker has created considerable ill will by charging first-run movie prices for an attraction so obviously designed for television that the audience can almost see the test patterns."

In 1971, Kulik directed Brian's Song, for which he received "Best Director" honours from the Directors Guild of America. For several years in a row the lead actors in the films he directed won "Best Actor" of the year including Peter Ustinov for A Storm in Summer, James Caan for Brian's Song, Alan Alda for Kill Me if You Can, Susan Clark for Babe, and Anthony Hopkins for The Lindbergh Kidnapping. Some of the prominent long-form mini series he directed were From Here to Eternity with Natalie Wood and William Devane, Around the World in 80 Days with Pierce Brosnan and Peter Ustinov, and Kane and Abel with Peter Strauss.

In the 1970s and 1980s he also directed feature films including To Find a Man, Shamus with Burt Reynolds, and The Hunter with Steve McQueen.

== Filmography ==
Film

- The Explosive Generation (1961)
- The Yellow Canary (1963)
- Ready for the People (1964)
- Warning Shot (1967)
- Sergeant Ryker (1968) (shot in 1963 as a television feature)
- Villa Rides (1968)
- Riot (1969)
- A Storm in Summer (1970)
- To Find a Man (1972)
- Shamus (1973)
- The Hunter (1980)
- The Pursuit of D.B. Cooper (1981) (uncredited)

TV series

- Perry Mason Case of the Pint-Sized Client (1958)
- Perry Mason Case of the Dangerous Dowager (1959)
- Kentucky Jones (1964–1965 TV series)

Miniseries

- Vanished (1971)
- From Here to Eternity (1979)
- George Washington (1984)
- Kane & Abel (1985 )
- Around the World in 80 Days (1989)
- Lucky Chances (1990)

TV movies

- Collector's Item (1958)
- Kings of Broadway (1962)
- Campo 44 (1967) (pilot)
- Brian's Song (1971)
- Crawlspace (1972) (Uncredited)
- The Man Who Came to Dinner (1972)
- Incident on a Dark Street (1973)
- Portrait: A Man Whose Name Was John (1973)
- Pioneer Woman (1973)
- Remember When (1974)
- Bad Ronald (1974)
- Cage Without a Key (1975)
- Babe (1975)
- The Lindbergh Kidnapping Case (1976)
- Never Con a Killer (pilot for TV series The Feather and Father Gang) (1977)
- Corey: For the People (1977)
- Kill Me If You Can (1977)
- Ziegfeld: The Man and His Women (1978)
- Rage of Angels (1983)
- Women of Valor (1986)
- Her Secret Life (1987)
- Too Young the Hero (1988)
- Miles from Nowhere (1992)
