= The Yellow Canary =

1963 film by Buzz Kulik

- Theatrical release poster
- Directed by: Buzz Kulik
- Screenplay by: Rod Serling
- Based on: Evil Come, Evil Go; 1961 novel by Whit Masterson
- Produced by: Maury Dexter executive Robert L. Lippert
- Starring: Pat Boone
- Cinematography: Floyd Crosby
- Edited by: Jodie Copelan
- Music by: Kenyon Hopkins
- Production company: Cooga Mooga Productions
- Distributed by: Twentieth Century Fox Film Corporation
- Release date: May 15, 1963
- Running time: 93 min.
- Country: United States
- Language: English

The Yellow Canary (also known as Evil Come, Evil Go, Easy Come, Easy Go and Crime Against the King) is a 1963 American thriller film directed by Buzz Kulik and starring Pat Boone and Barbara Eden. It was adapted by Rod Serling from a novel by Whit Masterson.The film was photographed by veteran Floyd Crosby and scored by jazz composer Kenyon Hopkins.

== Plot ==
Andy Paxton is an arrogant, obnoxious pop idol who is about to be divorced by his wife Lissa. He constantly abuses his staff, including his bodyguard, ex-cop Hub, his manager Vecchio, and his valet, Bake.

Andy begins an engagement at the Huntington Hartford Theater in Los Angeles. After his opening performance, Andy, his entourage, and his wife stop at home so Lissa can check on infant son Bobby before they all go to dinner. After Lissa runs into the house they hear her screaming hysterically. Instead of Bobby, she has found a doll and a note in his bed and the nurse murdered. The men run into the house to discover that the baby was kidnapped. Despite instructions to the contrary, they call the police. Andy tears the codeword "canary" from the note and withholds it from detective Lt. Bonner but is later convinced to reveal it. A second message arrives demanding $200,000 ransom, which Andy manages to raise. He delivers the money to an isolated beach but nobody comes to meet him. Hub takes Andy to a lonely inn and tortures a woman into giving them the address of a man who might have been in touch with the kidnappers. They find the man dead.

After Bake is found murdered, Andy receives further instructions by telephone from the kidnapper, and realizes that Hub is one of the few people who know their unlisted number. Andy and Lissa return to the inn and rescue their baby, and Andy shoots the mentally deranged Hub as police cars surround the inn.

== Cast ==
- Pat Boone as Andy Paxton
- Barbara Eden as Lissa Paxton
- Steve Forrest as Hub Wiley
- Jack Klugman as Lt. Bonner
- Jesse White as Ed Thornburg
- Steve Harris as Bake
- Milton Selzer as Vecchio
- Jeff Corey as Joe Pyle
- Harold Gould as Ponelli
- John Banner as Skolman

== Production ==
=== Development ===
In 1961, Pete Levathes, head of 20th Century Fox, authorised the studio to pay $200,000 for the rights to Whit Masterton's novel Evil Come Evil Go. The film was always envisioned as a vehicle for Pat Boone, who had made a number of movies for Fox; he had a three-picture deal with the studio at a fee of $200,000 per movie, which would be credited to his production company, Cooga Mooga Productions.

Rod Serling, then at the height of his Twilight Zone fame, was paid $125,000 to write the script. With a star and writer of that caliber, the film was originally estimated to have a budget between $1.5 and 2.0 million and be shot over 10 weeks. Ann-Margret was mentioned as a possibility for the female lead.

=== Film becomes low-budget ===
Peter Levathes was fired in the wake of cost over-runs on Cleopatra, and Darryl F. Zanuck took over the studio. Zanuck called a halt to all productions at the studio, literally shutting down the backlot on 26 July 1962.

Zanuck was obliged to pay a fee to Boone and Serling. By this stage, the studio also had commitments to Barbara Eden and Steve Forrest (the latter at a fee of $25,000). Zanuck assigned the film to Robert L. Lippert's company, Associated Producers Inc, who specialized in making lower-budget films for Fox. Zanuck gave Lippert $100,000 to finish the film and a shortened schedule. (Maury Dexter, who produced the film for Lippert, puts this figure at $250,000 in his memoirs.)

The New York Times reported that Boone "fears that the 10-day shooting schedule will deny it the artistic and production values it might have had with the 10-week shooting schedule he expected" – he decided to proceed with the film anyway.

=== Filming ===
Filming began on 10 December 1962. Some shooting was done for the film on the Fox lot, which was otherwise closed. During production, the title was changed to The Yellow Canary.

The cast included Jeff Corey, who had been blacklisted and had not made a movie for a number of years. Boone had been taught by Corey and he pressured the studio into casting him.

In a September 2012 interview at the UCLA Film and Television Archive, Boone stated that the film was slated for a ridiculously short 12-day schedule. When they were wrapping the last day with several key scenes left to be filmed, Boone paid $20,000 out of his own pocket to buy one more day of shooting. He felt strongly about the film because it gave him the chance to play "a bad guy for a change."

Maury Dexter later recalled:

The film was a nice production, but didn’t really come off. It did nothing at the box office and the critics panned it. Serling, Boone, Forrest, and Eden were all play-or-pay contracts, so... [Fox] preferred to play instead of paying off the commitments. (Probably should not have thrown good money after bad.) I produced the show, and with due respect to all concerned, the production overshadowed the drama.

== Reception ==
Variety wrote: "Serling's screenplay, from Whit Masterson's novel, "Evil Come, Evil Go," is reasonably strong in dramatic anatomy, but limp and fuzzy in character definition. The characters are thrust at the audience, with little or no attempt to illustrate the nature of their odd dispositions toward society and each other. It is difficult for the audience to accept these personalities merely on hearsay, and the film never recovers from this initial expository weakness, not that it gets better as it goes along."

Boxoffice wrote: "Robert L. Lippert has long been turning out modest-budget programmers which fit neatly into the supporting slot on dual bills, but his latest has the star value and better story content to top the bill or play alone in many situations. While Pat Boone might destroy his movie image as a 'nice guy,' he gives an adult, convincing portrayal of a hard-drinking, cigar-smoking, conceited tough guy which will win him new fans and intrigue his teenage following. Playing a popular singer, Pat also warbles several tunes in his sure-fire fashion. The interest-holding screenplay ... has mystery and suspense, and director Buzz Kulik builds interest steadily towards the violent climax."

Critic Andrew Sarris, in his book The American Cinema, thought the film revealed "an interesting glimmer of intelligence."

Leonard Maltin gave the film his lowest rating, designated it as a complete "bomb."

According to Diabolique magazine: "Boone whined about Fox's cheapness, but Zanuck was right. Serling's script isn’t very good with too much flowery dialogue. Because it's a thriller, the low budget didn’t necessarily have to hurt in the hands of an imaginative director. But Dexter was a second-rater. It is interesting to see Boone play someone unpleasant who proves his manhood by shooting someone dead. This was a rare film where the actor used a gun. The movie flopped at the box office."
