= Rudy Franchi =

American writer (1939–2024)

Rudy Franchi and his wife Barbara in London, England

Rudy Franchi (April 21, 1939 – August 6, 2024) was an American writer and editor on film theory and film criticism and an antiques and collectibles expert. He helped to introduce the French critical protocol the "auteur theory" to the United States. For several decades, Franchi also operated galleries that specialized in pop culture collectibles. In 1995, he began appearing as an appraiser on the PBS series, Antiques Roadshow, specializing in pop culture memorabilia.

== Early life and career ==
Franchi was born in New York City on April 21, 1939. His early education was at St. John's Grammar School, St. Ann's Academy, and Fordham College. He left Fordham at the end of his junior year to work with Daniel Talbot at the New Yorker Theater running a weekly film society. He then started the Archive Film Society and after its first season, joined the Bleecker Street Cinema as associate program director (along with the late Marshall Lewis).

During this period, he was the New York representative of the Montreal World Film Festival and also did freelance publicity, specializing in independent and foreign films. He then joined 20th Century Fox's New York office as head of Newspaper and Trade Paper publicity. After a stint of unit publicity work, he married Barbara Passel and moved to Montreal with his wife and two young girls, and eventually the couple had a third daughter.

== NY Film Bulletin ==
While in college, Franchi started a small, mimeographed newsletter, the New York Film Bulletin, which listed various screenings and other off-beat film events in the New York area. It also contained film reviews and articles on trends in the world of independent and U.S. released foreign films. When he left Fordham, he took the publication with him, upgraded it to a fully printed magazine and began, in the early 1960s, to print translations from the famed French film theory and film criticism magazine Cahiers du cinéma.

NYFB helped to popularize the views of the French New Wave in the US, and helped introducing François Truffaut's auteur theory to America via the early writings of Andrew Sarris, among others. The magazine published two major interviews with François Truffaut in which the French director outlined the evolution of his Politique Des Auteurs. NYFB was edited and published from an office located in The Bleecker Street Cinema and the theater became a focal point for New Wave directors (Truffaut, Godard, Resnais, among others) visiting New York as well as a meeting place for New York auteurists and others.

The long Sunday afternoon discussions involved Franchi, Sarris, Carlos Clarens, Jonas Mekas, Marshall Lewis. Sarris' review of Jonathan Demme's The Truth About Charlie alluded to Franchi. Sarris stated that "not to mention the dedication of the film to the late Ted Demme and Marshall Lewis, one of the two guys in the back of the Bleecker Street Cinema (the other was Rudy Franchi) with whom I spent many convivial hours of Francophilia and cinephilia. After all that, how can I pretend to be objective about Mr. Demme’s labor of love?"

After working in the Canadian film industry for several years, Franchi left the movie business to follow his growing interest in antiques and collectibles. He opened a shop called Gallery 90/40 which specialized in art nouveau and art deco graphics and objects. This shop evolved into The Nostalgia Factory, which focused on pop culture memorabilia such as original old advertising, movie, war and travel posters, and political items.

In 1977 Franchi and his family returned to the United States, living in Newport, Rhode Island, until 1987, when they moved to Boston. In both cities, Rudy and Barbara ran Nostalgia Factory shops and in 1994 launched a web site, Nostalgia.com, which evolved into the largest seller of original movie posters on the internet. In 2005, the Franchi's sold The Nostalgia Factory and nostalgia.com to Newbury Comics and the couple moved to Los Angeles. In 2006 he created the website Poster Appraisal Dot Com which offers free evaluations of movie, war, travel, rock and advertising posters.

== Antiques Roadshow ==
Franchi joined the PBS series Antiques Roadshow during its first season in 1995, and he was a regular on the series from then on. His specialty was pop culture collectibles and he made a series of major discoveries on the show including an original first class menu for the RMS Titanic. He represented Heritage Auction Galleries on Antiques Roadshow and acted as a consultant to the movie poster and entertainment memorabilia divisions of the Dallas-based firm.

== Murder on the Road Show ==
In November 2015 Franchi's book Murder on the Roadshow was published (Henchman Press, Somerville, Mass.). It is a mystery set against the background of a fictional television show, Antiques on the Road and it features a roguish, charming collectibles appraiser who discovers a body, is a suspect in the murder and eventually solves the crime. Along the way there are some telling revelations of antiques/collectibles dealing trade secrets plus a number of appraisals of pop culture detritus ranging from Mickey Mouse memorabilia to vintage Coca-Cola signs.

== Death ==
Franchi died from lung cancer on August 6, 2024, at the age of 85.

== Bibliography ==
- Miller's Movie Collectibles, Rudy & Barbara Franchi, Mitchell Beazley – London/Phaidon Press NY/2002
- Murder on the Road Show, Henchman Press 2015
