= Warning Shot (1967 film) =

1967 film by Buzz Kulik

- Film poster
- Directed by: Buzz Kulik
- Screenplay by: Mann Rubin
- Based on: novel 711 - Officer Needs Help by Whit Masterson
- Produced by: Buzz Kulik
- Starring: David Janssen; Joan Collins; Keenan Wynn; Sam Wanamaker; Lillian Gish; Stefanie Powers; Eleanor Parker
- Cinematography: Joseph F. Biroc
- Edited by: Archie Marshek
- Music by: Jerry Goldsmith
- Production company: Bob Banner Associates
- Distributed by: Paramount Pictures
- Release date: January 18, 1967
- Running time: 100 min.
- Country: United States
- Language: English
- Budget: $2.5 million

Warning Shot is a 1967 American crime-thriller film directed and produced by Buzz Kulik and starring David Janssen, Joan Collins, Keenan Wynn, Ed Begley, Stefanie Powers, Sam Wanamaker, George Grizzard, Carroll O'Connor, Steve Allen, Eleanor Parker, Walter Pidgeon, George Sanders and Lillian Gish. The screenplay concerns a police sergeant who kills a man while on a stakeout, then must prove that it was self-defense. The screenplay by Mann Rubin was based on the 1965 novel 711 - Officer Needs Help by Whit Masterson.

Baseball stars Sandy Koufax and Don Drysdale signed to appear in the film during their 1966 holdout but never made it onto the screen when both agreed to contracts with the Los Angeles Dodgers. Filming took place between the third and fourth seasons of Janssen's television series The Fugitive. The script was written by Mann Rubin, who had authored the Fugitive episode "A Taste of Tomorrow", while the film was directed by Buzz Kulik with a jazz score by Jerry Goldsmith. It was released by Paramount Pictures.

== Plot ==
Los Angeles police sergeant Tom Valens is on a stakeout near an upscale apartment complex when he is forced to defend himself from a mysterious figure who aims a gun at him on a foggy night. The trouble is, the dead man turns out to be a prominent physician and pillar of the community, Dr. James Ruston, and his gun cannot be found at the scene.

Valens is in trouble with his department, specifically Roy Klodin, his captain. It doesn't help that Valens is still carrying the memory of having been shot while on duty nearly a year earlier. He is placed under suspension by the force while Frank Sanderman, a prosecutor with a grudge against trigger-happy cops, files manslaughter charges against him.

Setting out on his own to clear his name, Valens meets resistance from many including Ruston's financial adviser, Calvin York, and the doctor's alcoholic and flirtatious widow, Doris Ruston. Also unwilling to be of help to Valens is the doctor's nurse, Liz Thayer, who knew Ruston only as a humanitarian who made many trips to Mexico to unselfishly aid people in need. Even the elderly lady whom Dr. Ruston often came to visit, Alice Willows, speaks only with devotion to the doctor, who was very kind to her beloved dog. As Valens investigates Dr. Ruston, he learns that his public image does not match his real life, where he was unfaithful to his wife and had money troubles which mysteriously disappeared when Dr. Ruston doubled his income a few years prior.

The controversial cop's lone defender in public is acerbic television personality Perry Knowland, who turns out to be doing so only to increase his viewership. While trying to find some reason why Ruston would have been skulking in the fog near the apartments and brandishing a gun, Valens meets Alice Willows again after her dog passes away and she has him buried with all of his toys at a nearby pet cemetery.

Among the few offering a sympathetic ear are his estranged wife, Joanie, and another apartment resident, Walt Cody, a playboy pilot. Cody volunteers to fly Valens down to Mexico to see first-hand why Dr. Ruston commuted there so often. Complications arise when Liz Thayer is found dead in Ruston's ransacked office, obliging Valens' partner, Sgt. Ed Musso, to try to place his friend under arrest.

Upon learning that Ruston's office was ransacked, Valens overpowers Musso and goes with Cody to the pet cemetery. They dig up Willows' dog and find Ruston's gun in the casket. Valens deduces that the dog, who liked Ruston, smelled the doctor's scent on the gun and brought it back to Willows' apartment. The barrel of the gun is packed with thousands of dollars of pure heroin. Valens tells Cody that Ruston had doubled his income by using his trips to Baja to cover a drug smuggling operation and that he knows Cody was Ruston's partner in the scheme. Cody draws a gun on Valens, but Valens shoots him dead.

== Cast ==
- David Janssen as Sgt. Tom Valens
- Joan Collins as Joanie Valens
- Ed Begley as Capt. Roy Klodin
- Keenan Wynn as Sgt. Ed Musso
- Sam Wanamaker as Frank Sanderman
- Lillian Gish as Alice Willows
- Stefanie Powers as Liz Thayer
- Eleanor Parker as Mrs. Doris Ruston
- George Grizzard as Walt Cody
- George Sanders as Calvin York
- Steve Allen as Perry Knowland
- Carroll O'Connor as Paul Jerez
- Walter Pidgeon as Orville Ames

== Home media ==
The film was released on DVD in 2005.

== See also ==
- List of American films of 1967
