= Whit Masterson =

Pen name of Bob Wade and H. Bill Miller

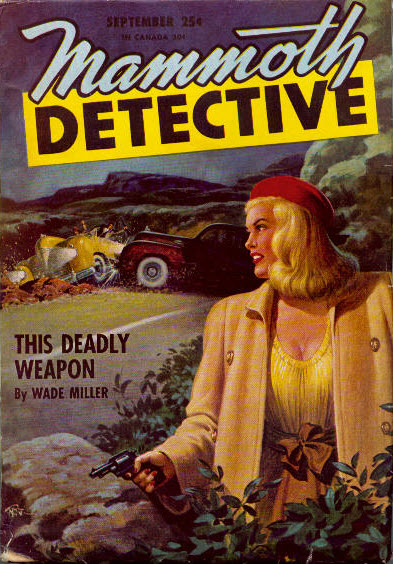
The Wade Miller novella "This Deadly Weapon" was the cover story for the September 1946 issue of Mammoth Detective

Whit Masterson was a pen name for a partnership of two American authors, Robert Allison Wade (June 7, 1920 – September 30, 2012) and H. William Miller (May 11, 1920 – August 21, 1961). The two also wrote under several other pseudonyms, including Wade Miller and Will Daemer.

Together they wrote more than thirty novels, of which several were adapted for film. Most famously, their novel Badge of Evil was adapted into the Orson Welles film Touch of Evil. Other works filmed were Guilty Bystander (1950), A Cry in the Night (1956) based on All Through the Night, The Yellow Canary (1963) based on Evil Come, Evil Go, Kitten with a Whip (1964) based on the novel of the same name, Warning Shot based on 711--Officer Needs Help and The Death of Me Yet (1971) based on the 1970 novel of the same name.

Wade and Miller met at violin lessons when they were both 12. From an interview with Wade: "The Wade Miller collaboration worked successfully largely because it began so early. We teamed up at the age of 12." They went on to attend college together at San Diego State, leaving in their senior year of college to enlist in the US Air Force.

Anthony Boucher reviewed their first novel, Deadly Weapon, in the San Francisco Chronicle in 1946. He described their prose as having "machinegun tempo, tight writing, unexaggerated hardness" and said it was a "highly satisfactory debut of new publishers and new writing team." A more recent reading by Richard Moore found that "modern readers would need to overcome instinctive reactions to racial and other slurs" but that "This was a stunning debut novel. It would be a shame if the language of the times kept it from revival."

After Miller's death from a heart attack on August 21, 1961, Wade continued his career as a successful writer, penning over 13 more novels both under his own name and as Whit Masterson, as well as writing a regular column for the San Diego Union.

In 1956, the partners were nominated for the prestigious Edgar Award, and in 1988, Robert Wade was awarded a Lifetime Achievement Award by the Private Eye Writers of America. Wade also received the Lifetime Achievement Award from the San Diego Public Library in 1998 and the Ellen Nehr award from the American Crime Writers League in 2004, for his work reviewing crime fiction for the San Diego Union-Tribune. Robert Wade died, at age 92, on Sept 30, 2012.
