= Badge of Evil =

1956 crime novel by Whit Masterson

- First edition
- Author: Whit Masterson
- Series: Red badge detective
- Genre: Detective fiction Mystery fiction
- Published: 1956
- Publisher: Dodd, Mead & Co.
- Pages: 209 pp
- OCLC: 4145937

Badge of Evil is a novel written by Whit Masterson (a pseudonym used by the authors Robert Allison “Bob” Wade and H. Bill Miller) and published in 1956. This novel was the basis for the 1958 movie Touch of Evil, directed by Orson Welles and co-starring Charlton Heston and Janet Leigh.

== Plot summary ==
A man named Rudy Linneker is killed when a mysterious killer blows up his house using a couple of sticks of dynamite. Assistant district attorney Mitch Holt is called to the case as well as police officers Leron McCoy and Hank Quinlan. The pair have gained a celebrity status in the city after thirty years of impeccable service and are considered legends in the city. Quinlan's leg was injured years before and he has since walked with a cane. At first, Linneker's daughter Tara and her fiancé Delmont Shayon are the primary suspects until disgruntled employee Ernest Farnum makes a surprise confession and is promptly jailed.

Holt is baffled by Farnum's testimony regarding the dynamite he planted in Shayon's apartment which contradicts his previous statement where he said he did not want to involve an innocent man like Shayon. Holt becomes suspicious of McCoy and Quinlan when both pay Farnum separate visits in his jail cell.

Holt brings this inconsistency to the attention of his superior James Adair and Chief of Police Gould. When Holt accuses McCoy and Quinlan of planting evidence, Adair and Gould dismiss his allegation as an attempt to gain political mileage in the District Attorney's office.

Things become dangerous for Holt when his house is shot at by a mysterious gunman whom he suspects is McCoy himself. Holt sends his wife Consuela and daughter Nancy to live in his father-in-law's ranch in Mexico where they would be safe. Holt then goes to the Hall of Records and digs into the past cases that involved McCoy and Quinlan.

Holt then meets with Dan Buccio, brother of gangster Emil Buccio, to confirm that the Buccio family had nothing to do with the shooting incident. Afterward, Holt discovers that his Hall of Records transcripts are stolen.

Soon after Consuela returns, Holt enlists the aid of the Press-Examiner newspaper to make his accusations public. This stirs things up in the city and Adair and Gould wash their hands of it. The plan backfires when Farnum commits suicide and the Press-Examiner is forced to drop Holt's story. Holt is later suspended but his problems worsen when Consuela is lured to a motel, drugged and framed for possession of illegal narcotics.

Desperate, Holt asks his friend Van Dusen to provide him with a wireless transmitter. Holt then confronts Quinlan about what he knows regarding McCoy's planting of evidence. The guilt-ridden Quinlan agrees to Holt's plan to force a confession out of McCoy. To that end, Quinlan is wired and he drives Holt to McCoy's residence. There, McCoy gleefully confesses his crimes to Quinlan while Holt secretly tapes their conversation in Quinlan's car. But in the heat of the discussion, the two cops become confrontational and McCoy shoots Quinlan dead. Holt escapes and later he plays the tape he made to Adair and Gould. McCoy is exposed and he later commits suicide. Consuela is eventually released from jail and Holt is reinstated as assistant in the District Attorney's office where he is given full authority to investigate the McCoy-Quinlan cases.
