= Andrew Sarris =

American film critic (1928–2012)

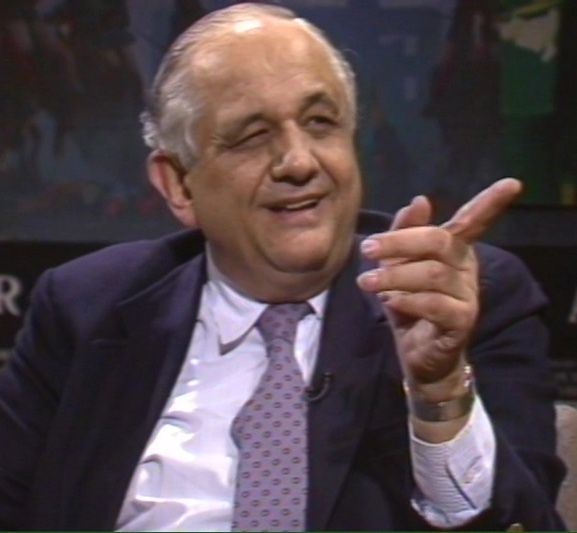
- Sarris on Cinema Then, Cinema Now (December 1990)
- Born: October 31, 1928 New York City, U.S.
- Died: June 20, 2012 (aged 83) New York City, U.S.
- Occupation: Film critic
- Education: Columbia University
- Period: 1960–2012
- Notable works: The American Cinema
- Spouse: Molly Haskell (m. 1969)

Andrew Sarris (October 31, 1928 – June 20, 2012) was an American film critic. He was a leading proponent and popularizer of the auteur theory of film criticism, particularly in The American Cinema (1968).

== Early life ==
Sarris was born in Brooklyn, New York, to Greek immigrant parents, Themis (née Katavolos) and George Andrew Sarris, and grew up in Ozone Park, Queens. After attending John Adams High School in South Ozone Park (where he overlapped with Jimmy Breslin), he graduated from Columbia University in 1951. He then served for three years in the U.S. Army Signal Corps during the Korean War.

Following his military service, he spent a year in Paris where he befriended French New Wave directors Jean-Luc Godard and François Truffaut and was exposed to the auteur theory, the notion, expressed in the writings of André Bazin and others, that great directors place a personal stamp of "authorship" on their films. Upon returning to New York's Lower East Side, Sarris briefly pursued graduate studies at his alma mater and at Teachers College, Columbia University before turning to film criticism. In the late 1950s, he was editor-in-chief of the English-language edition of the French film magazine Cahiers du Cinéma.

== Career ==
After initially writing for Film Culture, Sarris moved to The Village Voice where his first piece—a laudatory review of Psycho and of Alfred Hitchcock's "auteurism"—was published in 1960. Sarris later recalled the reaction to his review: "The Voice had all these readers—little old ladies who lived on the West Side, guys who had fought in the Spanish Civil War—and this seemed so regressive to them, to say that Hitchcock was a great artist". Around this time, Sarris returned to Paris where he was present at the premiere of French New Wave films such as Truffaut's Shoot the Piano Player (1960) and Godard's A Woman Is a Woman (1961). The experience expanded Sarris's view of film criticism: "To show you the dividing line in my thinking, when I did a Top Ten list for the Voice in 1958, I had a Stanley Kramer film on the list and I left off both Vertigo and Touch of Evil".

He continued to write film criticism for The New York Observer until 2009 and was a professor of film at Columbia University (where he earned an M.A. in English in 1998), teaching courses on international film history, American cinema and Hitchcock until his retirement in 2011. Sarris was a co-founder of the National Society of Film Critics.

For many years, he wrote for both NY Film Bulletin and The Village Voice. He was often seen as a rival to The New Yorker's Pauline Kael, who had originally attacked the auteur theory in her essay "Circles and Squares." Speaking of his long-running feuds with Kael, Sarris says that, oddly, "We made each other. We established a dialectic."

Sarris wrote, "When people have asked me to name the greatest film of all time—in my humble opinion, of course—my instant answer has been unvarying for the past 30 years or so: Max Ophüls' Madame de… (1953)." He added that "I usually answer questions about the greatest film of all time by immediately throwing in my own two runners-up: Mizoguchi's Ugetsu Monogatari (1953) and Renoir's La Règle du Jeu (1939). Then, if I can grasp the questioner's lapels long enough (much like Coleridge's crazed Ancient Mariner), I rattle off the rest of my all-time-ten-greatest-list: Alfred Hitchcock's Vertigo (1958), John Ford's The Searchers (1956), Orson Welles' The Magnificent Ambersons (1942), Luis Buñuel’s Belle de Jour (1967), F. W. Murnau's Sunrise (1927), Charles Chaplin's Modern Times (1936) and Buster Keaton's The General (1927)."

== Auteur theory ==
Sarris is generally credited with popularizing the auteur theory in the United States and coining the term in his Film Culture essay, "Notes on the Auteur Theory in 1962", inspired by critics in Cahiers du Cinéma. In 1968, Sarris expanded his essay into the landmark book, The American Cinema: Directors and Directions 1929–1968, an opinionated assessment of films of the sound era, organized by director. The book would influence many other critics and help raise awareness of the role of the director.

The controversies sparked by the auteur theory prompted Sarris to frequently qualify and defend his position. In The American Cinema (1968), he wrote that his 1962 essay "was written in what I thought was a modest, tentative, experimental manner, it was certainly not intended as the last word on the subject". In a 1970 Film Comment article, he claimed that the auteur theory "was therefore never a theory at all, but rather a collection of facts, a reminder of movies to be resurrected, of genres to be redeemed, of directors to be rediscovered." In a 1972 interview, he offered a spirited defense of the auteur perspective, saying it was necessary to appreciate directors like Howard Hawks, "whom no one had ever said anything about – and people like John Ford, and the totally neglected directors who built up large bodies of work that nobody paid any attention to." His 1977 essay "The Auteur Theory Revisited" was included in later reprint editions of The American Cinema.

== Legacy ==
In 2001, Emanuel Levy edited Citizen Sarris, American Film Critic: Essays in Honor of Andrew Sarris, a collection of 39 essays by notable critics (Dave Kehr, Todd McCarthy, Gerald Peary) and filmmakers (Martin Scorsese, John Sayles, Peter Bogdanovich, Curtis Hanson) alongside fans of Sarris's works.

J. Hoberman, Kenneth Turan, Armond White, Michael Phillips and A. O. Scott have cited him as an influence. His career is discussed in the documentary For the Love of Movies: The Story of American Film Criticism, first with other critics discussing how he brought the auteur theory from France, and then with Sarris himself explaining how he applied the theory in his original review of Hitchcock's Psycho. In 1997, Camille Paglia described Sarris as her third favorite critic, praising "his acute columns during the high period of The Village Voice."

== Personal life ==
Sarris married fellow film critic Molly Haskell in 1969; they lived on the Upper East Side of Manhattan. He died at St. Luke's Hospital in Manhattan on June 20, 2012, from an infection developed after a fall.

== Criticism ==
Sarris's method in The American Cinema of ranking directors by their degree of "auteurism" drew a backlash at the time from other writers and film critics, including Gore Vidal and Pauline Kael. Vidal complained that the auteur theory led to "the deification of directors over writers in the moviemaking process". Kael attacked Sarris's belief that "the distinguishable personality of the director is a criterion of value" because it resulted, in her opinion, in Sarris undervaluing film classics that did not fit his director-centric view.

In a Commentary review of The American Cinema, Paul Warshow faulted Sarris and other auteur critics for being "both dogmatic and arbitrary in deciding who is an auteur and who isn't.... To put it more crudely, but only a little unfairly, directors are either In or Out.... Although the auteur critics do make distinctions within the work of particular directors, a kind of stigma is automatically attached to even the best films of a director who is not an auteur just as, conversely, even the worst films of an auteur are redeemed by their significance within the oeuvre and by the apparently unmistakable stamp upon them of the auteur's style and personality."

== Works ==
- Sarris, Andrew (1966). The Films of Josef von Sternberg. New York City: Museum of Modern Art. LCCN 66-22482.
- —— (1968). The American Cinema: Directors and Directions, 1929-1968. New York: E. P. Dutton. LCCN 69-12602.
- Sarris, Andrew, ed. (1968). The Film. Indianapolis: Bobbs-Merrill. LCCN 68-24166.
- ——, ed. (1968). Interviews with Film Directors. New York: Avon Books. LCCN 81-109880.
- —— (1970). Confessions of a Cultist: On the Cinema, 1955-1969. New York: Simon and Schuster. ISBN 978-0671205546.
- —— (1973). The Primal Screen: Essays on Film and Related Subjects. New York: Simon and Schuster. ISBN 978-0671213411.
- —— (1975). The John Ford Movie Mystery. Bloomington: Indiana University Press. ISBN 978-0253331670.
- —— (1978). Politics and Cinema. New York: Columbia University Press. ISBN 978-0231040341.
- ——, ed. (1998). The St. James Film Directors Encyclopedia. Detroit: Visible Ink Press. ISBN 978-1578590285.
- —— (1998). You Ain't Heard Nothin' Yet: The American Talking Film: History & Memory, 1927-1949. New York: Oxford University Press. ISBN 978-0195038835.
- Levy, Emanuel, ed. (2001). Citizen Sarris, American Film Critic: Essays in Honor of Andrew Sarris. Lanham, Maryland: Scarecrow Press. ISBN 978-0810838918.

== See also ==
- Experimental film
- Independent film
- New Hollywood
