= Touch of Evil =

1958 film by Orson Welles

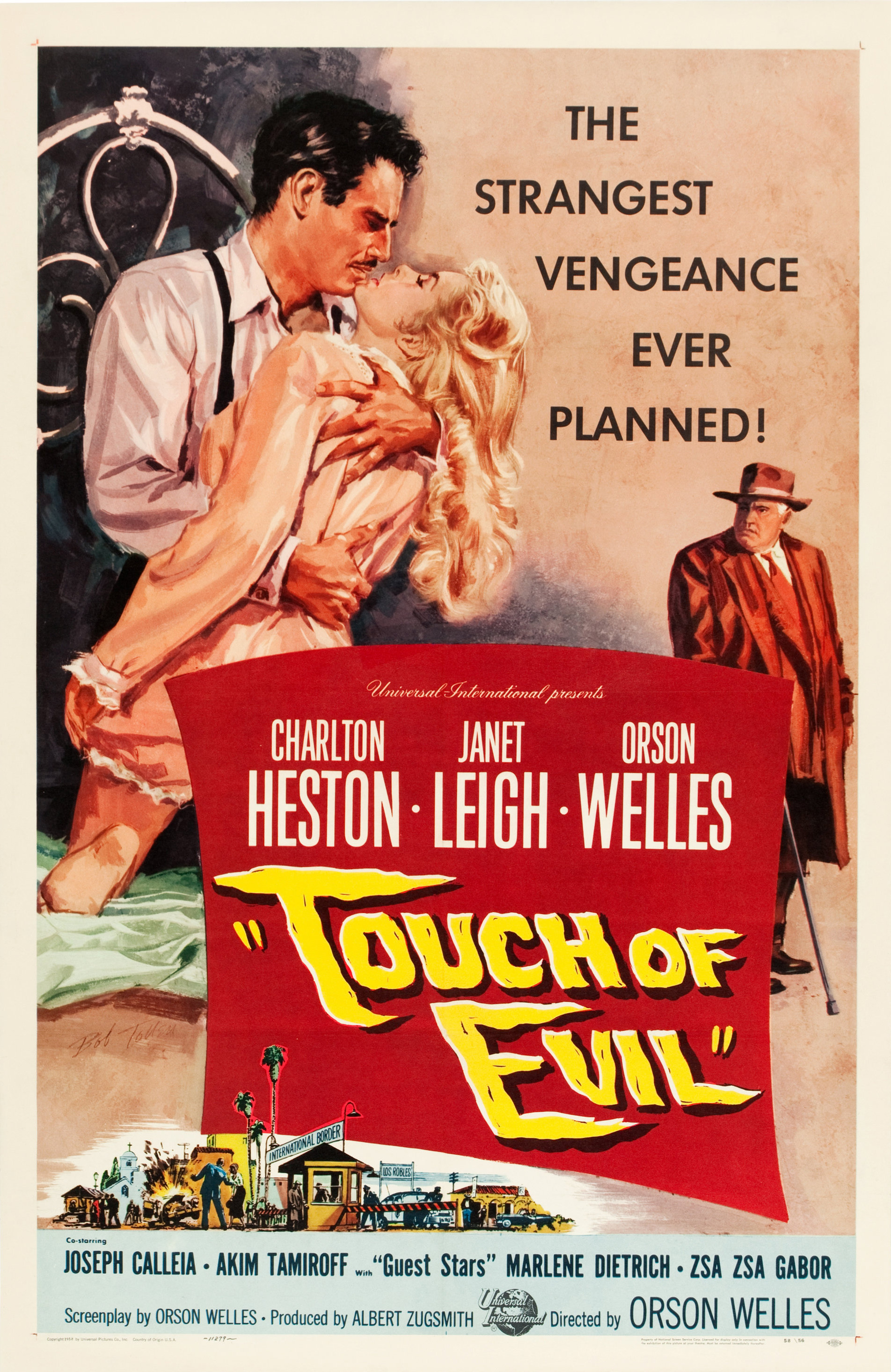
- Theatrical release poster
- Directed by: Orson Welles
- Screenplay by: Orson Welles
- Based on: Badge of Evil by Whit Masterson
- Produced by: Albert Zugsmith
- Starring: Charlton Heston; Janet Leigh; Orson Welles; Joseph Calleia; Akim Tamiroff; Marlene Dietrich; Zsa Zsa Gabor
- Cinematography: Russell Metty
- Edited by: Virgil Vogel; Aaron Stell
- Music by: Henry Mancini
- Production company: Universal-International
- Distributed by: Universal-International
- Release date: April 23, 1958
- Running time: 111 minutes (1998 version)
- Country: United States
- Language: English
- Budget: $829,000
- Box office: $2.25 million

Touch of Evil is a 1958 American film noir written and directed by Orson Welles, who also stars. The screenplay was loosely based on Whit Masterson's novel Badge of Evil (1956). The cast included Charlton Heston, Janet Leigh, Joseph Calleia, Akim Tamiroff and Marlene Dietrich.

Universal-International commissioned the film adaptation of the novel in April 1956. Albert Zugsmith was selected as producer, who then hired television writer Paul Monash to write the script. Heston was brought on board to star in January 1957 and suggested that Welles direct the project. Welles was hired to direct and star, as well as re-write the script. Filming started the next month and wrapped in April. During the film's post-production, creative differences between Welles and Universal executives arose and Welles was forced off the film. Subsequently, Universal-International revised the film's editing style to be more conventional and ordered re-shoots to be made in November 1957. In response to the new version, Welles wrote a 58-page memo in which he elaborately outlined his creative vision for the film and asked that his version be restored.

Initially dismissed by film critics, Touch of Evil found popularity among European audiences and won top awards at the 1958 Brussels World Film Festival. During the 1970s, its reputation was rehabilitated and it is now widely regarded as one of Welles's best motion pictures, one of the last and best of the classic-era noir films, and one of the greatest films of all time. In 1998, Walter Murch re-edited Touch of Evil according to Welles's original vision, as outlined in his memo.

In 1993, the film was selected for preservation in the United States National Film Registry by the Library of Congress as being "culturally, historically, or aesthetically significant".

== Plot ==
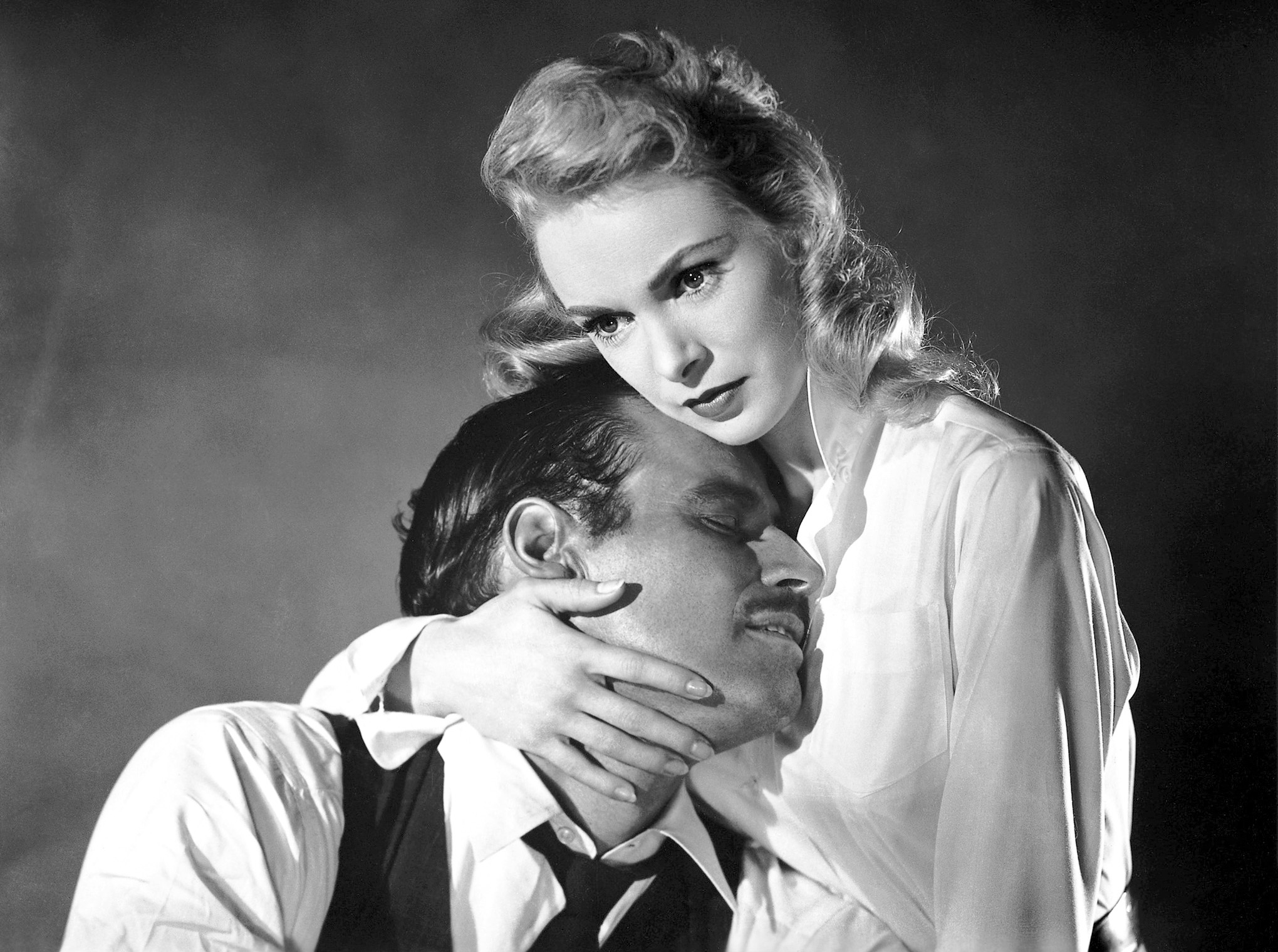
Janet Leigh and Charlton Heston in Touch of Evil

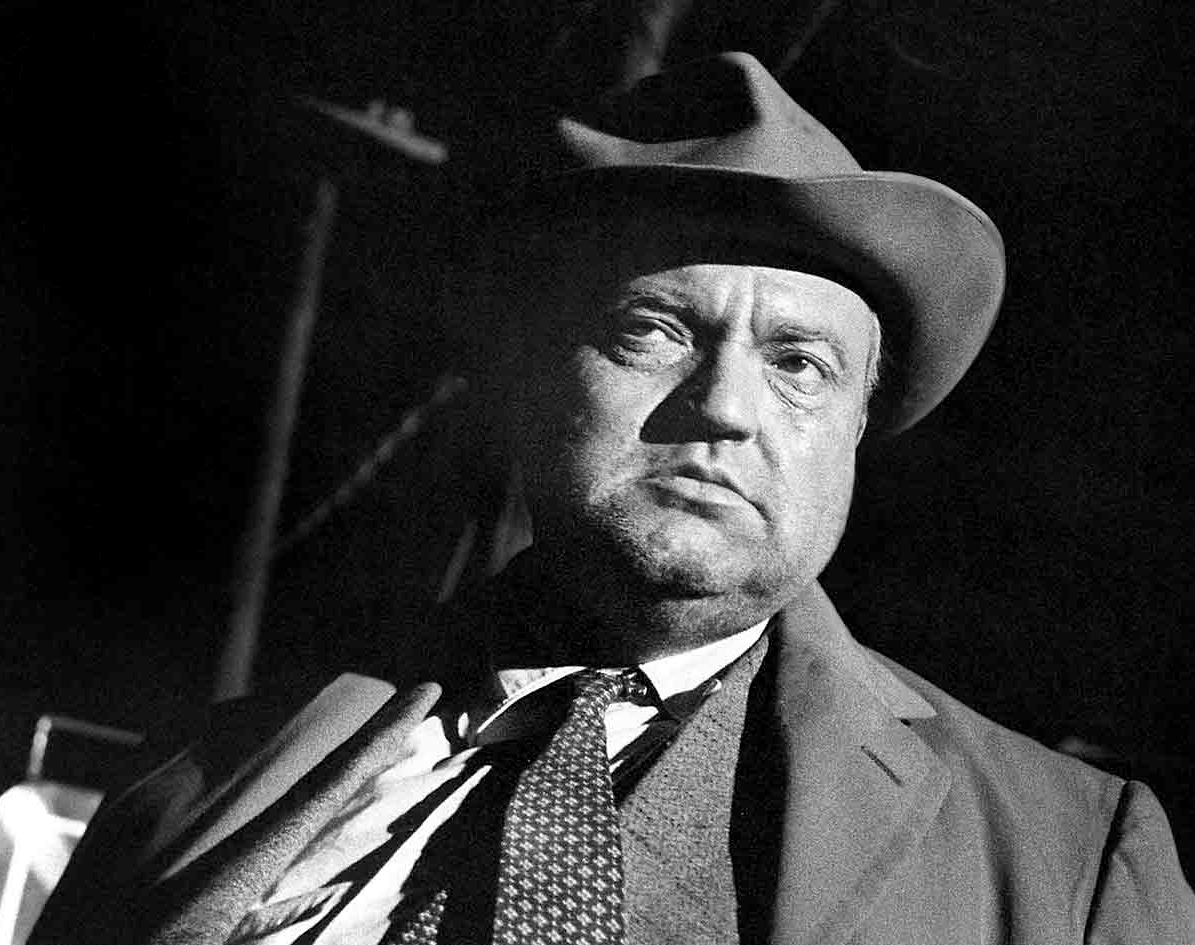
Orson Welles as Hank Quinlan

Along the U.S.–Mexico border, a time bomb placed inside a vehicle explodes, killing two people. Mexican special prosecutor Miguel Vargas, who is honeymooning in town with his new American wife Susie, takes an interest in the investigation, which is being conducted by veteran police captain Hank Quinlan and his devoted, admiring, fanatically loyal assistant, Pete Menzies. Quinlan is a recovering alcoholic and an anti-Mexican bigot. He injured his leg long ago, and now walks with a prosthetic "game" leg and a cane. He implicates Sanchez, a young Mexican man secretly married to the victim's daughter. During the interrogation at Sanchez's apartment, Menzies finds two sticks of dynamite in a shoe-box in the bathroom. Vargas, who had accidentally knocked over the shoe-box a few minutes earlier and found it empty, accuses Quinlan of planting the dynamite, and begins to suspect that many of his previous convictions were similarly tainted. Quinlan angrily dismisses Vargas's allegation. Vargas learns that Quinlan had recently purchased dynamite and presents proof of this to Adair, the District Attorney, who resists investigating further.

"Uncle" Joe Grandi, the acting leader of a crime family Vargas has been investigating, makes common cause with Quinlan against Vargas, and plies Quinlan with bourbon whiskey, causing him to break his sobriety. Grandi orders his family to capture and inject Susie with heroin, and while she is unconscious, he and Quinlan lock her in a hotel room. Quinlan then murders Grandi and leaves the body there with Susie; however, drunk and exhausted, he carelessly also leaves his cane in the room with them. When Susie wakes up and sees the body, she screams for help, and gets arrested on suspicion of the murder, which infuriates Vargas. Searching the room, Menzies finds Quinlan's cane, and realizes that Quinlan is the real killer.

Vargas, reviewing Quinlan's past successes, confirms his suspicion that Quinlan has planted evidence in many of the cases. He confronts Menzies, who sadly agrees to work with him to expose Quinlan, by wearing a wire and getting a confession.

Quinlan hears an echo from Vargas' recording device, and realizes that Menzies is betraying him. He shoots and mortally wounds Menzies. He then aims his gun at Vargas, but the dying Menzies shoots Quinlan before he can fire. Susie is exonerated and reunited with Vargas. As Quinlan dies, it is revealed that Sanchez has confessed to the original bombing.

== Cast ==
- Charlton Heston as Ramon Miguel "Mike" Vargas
- Janet Leigh as Susie Vargas
- Orson Welles as Police Captain Hank Quinlan
- Joseph Calleia as Sgt. Pete Menzies
- Akim Tamiroff as Uncle Joe Grandi
- Joanna Moore as Marcia Linnekar
- Ray Collins as District Attorney Adair
- Dennis Weaver as the Night Manager at the desolate motel
- Valentin de Vargas as Pancho
- Mort Mills as Al Schwartz
- Victor Millan as Manolo Sanchez
- Lalo Rios as Risto
- Michael Sargent as Pretty Boy
- Phil Harvey as Blaine
- Joi Lansing as Zita
- Harry Shannon as Police Chief Pete Gould
- Marlene Dietrich as Tana
- Zsa Zsa Gabor as the Strip-club owner
- Rusty Wescoatt as Casey
- Gus Schilling as Eddie Farnham
- Wayne Taylor as a gang member
- Ken Miller as a gang member
- Raymond Rodriguez as a gang member
- Arlene McQuade as Ginnie
- Dan White as the Border Guard
- Mercedes McCambridge as a gang leader
- William Tannen as Howard Frantz
- Joseph Cotten (uncredited) as a coroner

== Production ==
=== Development ===
In March 1956, the mystery novel Badge of Evil was released to generally favorable reviews and its sales were brisk, with two printings in hardcover. Edward Muhl, the head of production of Universal-International, believed the novel had cinematic possibilities and arranged to purchase the film rights through the literary agency Curtis Brown. By April 1956, the Los Angeles Times reported that the film rights had been acquired and that Albert Zugsmith (known as the "King of the Bs") had been tapped as producer. Zugsmith then assigned television writer Paul Monash to write the script adaptation within four weeks. Zugsmith then read Monash's script, but did not care for it and temporarily halted any further development on the project. By December 1956, Zugsmith had received a memo from Universal executive Mel Tucker inquiring about the development of Badge of Evil and suggested the possibility of casting Charlton Heston as the lead.

By January 1957, having just finished promoting The Ten Commandments (1956), Heston had received the script and considered it good enough. The actor contacted Universal to ask who they had considered to direct. They told him that they did not know, but Orson Welles was lined up as Hank Quinlan. Heston then replied, "Why not him direct, too. He's pretty good" to which the studio responded "We'll get back to you." Universal studio head executives Ernest Nims and Jim Pratt—both of whom had worked with Welles on The Stranger (1946)—lobbied for Welles to direct again. Based on Pratt's suggestion, Universal-International offered Welles $125,000 for the job to act, direct, and based on his choosing, to rewrite the script. On January 11, it was officially announced that Welles had signed with Muhl to star in and direct Badge of Evil.

Welles had previously starred in Man in the Shadow (1957), which Zugsmith produced. According to Zugsmith, on the last day of shooting, Welles, who was impressed with Zugsmith's writing abilities, expressed that he was interested in directing a picture for him. Zugsmith offered Welles a pile of scripts, of which he requested the worst one. Welles was then handed Monash's script for Badge of Evil to which he asked, "Can I have two weeks to write it?" Zugsmith replied, "You can have it."

=== Writing ===
It started with rehearsals. We rehearsed two weeks prior to shooting, which was unusual. We rewrote most of the dialogue, all of us, which was also unusual, and Mr. Welles always wanted our input. It was a collective effort, and there was such a surge of participation, of creativity, of energy. You could feel the pulse growing as we rehearsed. You felt you were inventing something as you went along. Mr. Welles wanted to seize every moment. He didn't want one bland moment. He made you feel you were involved in a wonderful event that was happening before your eyes.

— Janet Leigh, recalling how Welles asked for input from the actors in the cast

For his screenplay draft, Welles made numerous changes along with smaller changes to better tighten the script. His two main contributions dealt with his thematic element of American racism and his decision to shift narrative points of view. He shifted the location setting from San Diego to the Mexico–United States border near Tijuana. Welles renamed the protagonist from Mitch Holt to Miguel Vargas, stating he made the character a Mexican "for political reasons. I wanted to show how Tijuana and the border towns are corrupted by all sorts of mish-mash, publicity more or less about American relations". Welles's shooting script was finished by February 5, 1957. Heston stated that Welles re-wrote the script in ten days.

=== Casting ===
Welles selected Janet Leigh for the role of Susan Vargas. Before her agent had notified her of the casting, Welles contacted Leigh via telegram stating how delighted he was to work with her on Badge of Evil. She contacted her agent, and accepted the part. Dennis Weaver was asked to audition as the night manager after Welles had watched him as Chester Goode on Gunsmoke. He was instructed to improvise. Meanwhile, Zugsmith had met Joanna Cook Moore at a party, and was determined that she was right for the role as Marcia Linnekar. Welles rounded out the supporting cast with Akim Tamiroff, whom he previously cast in Mr. Arkadin (1955), while Joseph Cotten, Ray Collins, Marlene Dietrich, and Keenan Wynn agreed to appear in the film for union pay scale and without screen credit. Zugsmith also insisted that his friend Zsa Zsa Gabor be given a cameo in the film. Ultimately, all actors were paid over union scale and given screen credit, except Cotten.

Having known Mercedes McCambridge since her time at Mercury Theatre, Welles called her and requested she arrive at the set. Leigh and the actors dressed as "greasy-looking hoodlums" stood around waiting for Welles to start filming. Welles had McCambridge's hair cut and applied black shoe polish over her newly trim hair and eyebrows. According to her memoir: "They brought a black leather jacket from somewhere, and I was 'ready.' Orson said he wanted a heavy, coarse Mexican accent. I said, 'You've got it!'"

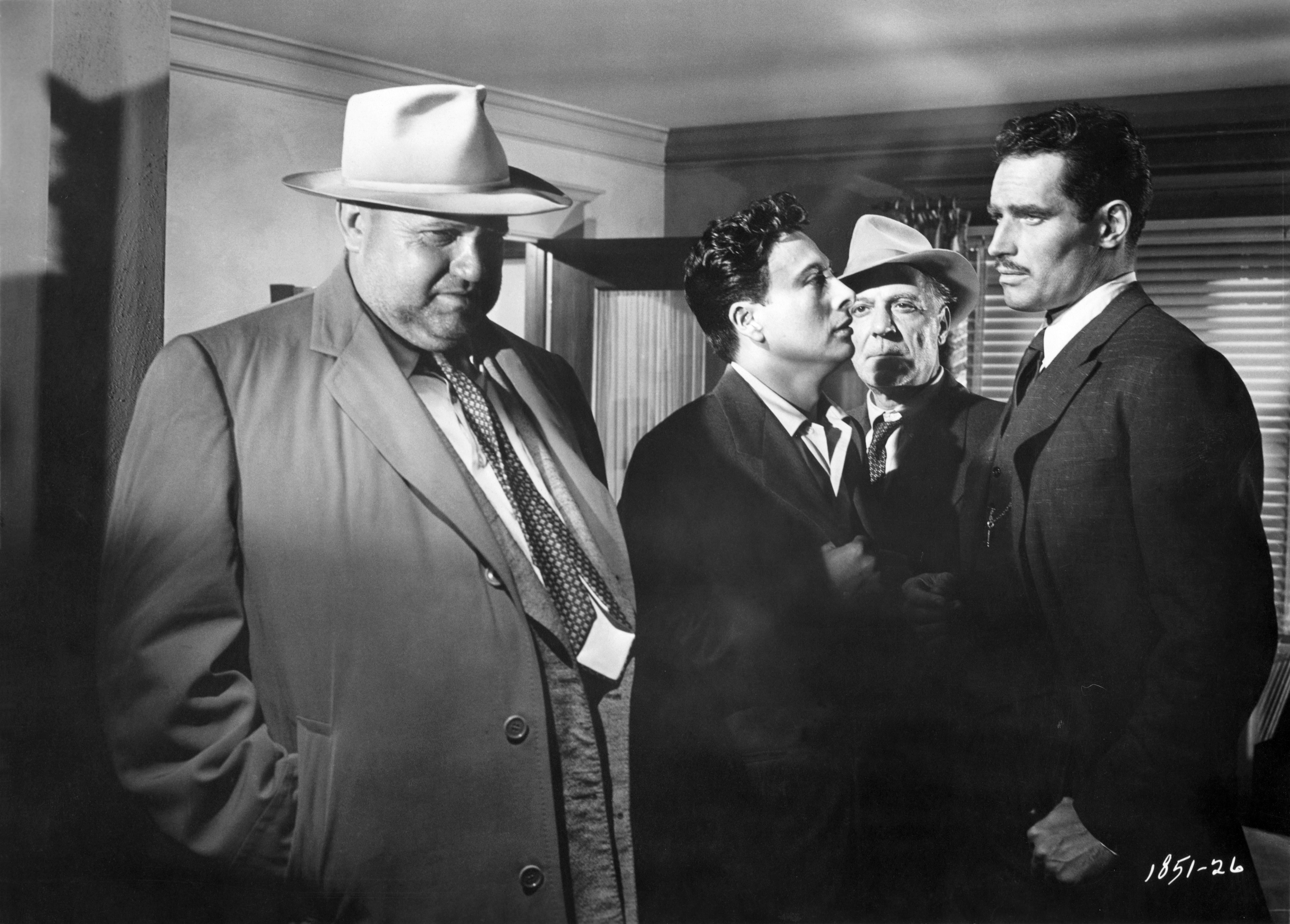
Orson Welles (Quinlan), Victor Millan (Sanchez), Joseph Calleia (Menzies), and Charlton Heston (Vargas)

Joseph Calleia was cast as Quinlan's longtime partner Pete Menzies, giving Welles an opportunity to work with an actor he had long admired. "What an actor—Joseph Calleia", said Welles:

I fell in love with him as a ten-year-old boy. I saw him in a play in New York ... a very well-staged melodrama which was an enormous hit for about a year—it was made as a movie later with somebody else. He had the leading role, and I never forgot him. And through the years I'd seen him in movies—little things. And I could never forget that performance of his. He's always played very stereotyped parts in pictures but is one of the best actors I've ever known. I have such respect for him. You play next to him and you just feel the thing that you do with a big actor—this dynamo going on.

"Even among these performers, one man's sincerity stands out," wrote George E. Turner, film historian and editor of The American Cinematographer. "Joseph Calleia, a veteran actor from Malta, makes Menzies the most realistic and touching character in the film. ... His agony is the true touchstone of the film."

=== Filming ===
The film was shot in Venice, California from February 18, 1957, to April 2, 1957. The location had been suggested to Welles by Aldous Huxley, who informed him the town had decayed significantly. Welles, cinematographer Russell Metty, and the art directors drove there, and upon viewing the city's Bridge of Sighs, Welles decided to revise the ending to incorporate it. Sometime during the early months of filming, Zugsmith retitled the film to Touch of Evil, which Welles later criticized calling it "silly."

As when he worked with cinematographer Gregg Toland, Welles and Metty devised a distinctive visual style for Touch of Evil—incorporating deep focus, off-kilter and low-angle shots (to emphasize the girth of Quinlan), and other stylistic touches that furthered the visual style of film noir. Most notable among the stylistic flourishes in the film is an opening crane shot that runs almost three-and-a-half minutes, which has frequently been commented on by film scholars.

Heston's autobiography states that the scene with Vargas and Schwartz in the convertible marks the first time that a scene with dialogue was shot in a moving car, rather than a stationary one in front of a projection screen. However, there is an earlier example of such a scene in Gun Crazy (1950).

=== Post-production ===
As was typical, Welles himself worked on the film's editing, paired initially with Edward Curtiss. According to Zugsmith, the two had creative differences, and Curtiss was replaced with Virgil Vogel. During June 1957, Welles flew out to New York to appear on The Steve Allen Show. In his absence, studio executives had scheduled a screening of the rough cut. Informed of this by Vogel, Welles was angered, resulting in Universal post-production head Ernest Nims cancelling the screening. At this point, Vogel agreed to step down, and Nims appointed Aaron Stell, another Universal staff editor, to finish the film. When Welles returned to Hollywood, Nims instructed him to stay out of the editing room and let Stell work alone. Having been locked out, Welles went to Mexico City in late June 1957 to begin shooting his next film, Don Quixote.

On his own, Stell constantly changed the editing sequence, providing different interpretations of multiple scenes in which he altered the continuity. Throughout the editing process, Stell was never satisfied, and at the end of his tenure, he stated he had grown "ill, depressed and unhappy with the studio's impatience." In July 1957, Stell's cut was screened to the executives, most of whom were left unimpressed. According to Nims, Welles "had really messed up those first five reels...He was making those quick cuts—in the middle of a scene you cut to another scene, and then come back and finish the scene, and then cut to the last half of the other scene."

Hoping to make the continuity editing more conventional, Muhl appointed Nims to re-edit the film. A month later, Nims's cut was shown to Welles, who remained diplomatic but was astonished at the newly altered cut. Welles wrote a memorandum as a critique of Nim's revisions, and shortly after, he left for Louisiana to appear in Martin Ritt's The Long, Hot Summer (1958). By November 1957, Universal removed about fifteen minutes from the film, and hired Harry Keller to film some expository scenes intended to make the plot easier to follow.

Out of loyalty to Welles, Heston and Leigh initially refused to film the re-shoots. A week later, Heston's agents informed him that he was contractually obligated to film re-shoots if necessary. For the re-shoots, Clifford Stine had replaced Metty as the film's cinematographer while new dialogue had been written by Franklin Coen, a staff scriptwriter for Universal. Several new scenes were filmed including four scenes between Vargas and his wife, a love scene in the car, and a scene where Menzies explains about Quinlan's leg. Another scene was shot in which Quinlan's car meets Vargas's en route to the motel, in which an uncredited actor doubles for Welles. On November 19, re-shoots under Keller were completed. Heston further reflected in his journal: "I have done worse work in the movies than this day's retakes, but I don't remember feeling worse...I was able to talk them out of one change I felt was a mistake."

On December 5, 1957, having been screened a new cut, Welles presented a 58-page memorandum addressed to Muhl, detailing what he thought needed to be done to make the film work. In response, Muhl stated his changes would be implemented, but also requested that Welles attend a dubbing session. Welles refused.

== Release ==
=== Initial release and reception ===
Touch of Evil was given a sneak preview at a theater in Pacific Palisades, Los Angeles on January 31, 1958. This version of the film ran 108 minutes, and was not well received. Heston wrote in his journal that "I'm afraid it's simply not a good picture. It has the brilliance that made each day's rushes look so exciting, of course. Indeed, there's hardly a dull shot in the film. But it doesn't hold together as a story." In February 1958, Touch of Evil was attached in a double bill with The Female Animal, starring Hedy Lamarr, which was also produced by Albert Zugsmith and directed by Harry Keller. The two films even had the same cameraman, Russell Metty. This general version ran only 94 minutes.

==== Contemporary reviews ====
Howard Thompson of The New York Times wrote "...while good versus evil remains the text, the lasting impression of this film is effect rather than substance, hence its real worth." He complimented the film's direction noting that "Mr. Welles' is an obvious but brilliant bag of tricks. Using a superlative camera (manned by Russell Metty) like a black-snake whip, he lashes the action right into the spectator's eye." Philip K. Scheuer of the Los Angeles Times wrote "As usual, Welles has placed mood above content. But what mood! Touch of Evil is underkeyed, underlighted and undermonitored (for sound), but with the assistance of Russell Metty's marvelous mobile camera it charges ahead like the pure cinema it so often succeeds in being, complete with built-in stocks." Harrison's Reports felt that Welles "has peopled the story with odd characterizations and, in an apparent effort to get away from routine picture-making, has made dramatic use of unusual photographic angles, shadows and lighting. This makes for an arty approach but it seems to lessen the dramatic impact of the story. The acting is very good, and a number of the individual scenes are tense and exciting."

Variety felt that "Welles establishes his creative talent with pomp, but unfortunately the circumstances of the story suffer. There is insufficient orientation and far too little exposition, with the result that much of the action is confusing and difficult to relate to the plot...Welles' script contains some hard-hitting dialogue; his use of low-key lighting with Russell is effective, and Russell Metty's photography is fluid and impressive; and Henry Mancini's music is poignant. But Touch of Evil proves it takes more than good scenes to make a good picture." Dorothy Masters, reviewing for the New York Daily News, gave the film three stars out of four noting that the "Welles touch is manifest in a taut screen play, suspenseful presentation, stark backgrounds, off-beat camera angles and a weird assortment of characters. The production is advantage and are ably supported by the rest of the cast."

==== Accolades ====
Although Universal Pictures did its best to prevent Touch of Evil from being selected for the 1958 Brussels World Film Festival—part of the Expo 58 world's fair—the film received its European premiere and Welles was invited to attend. To his astonishment, Welles collected the two top awards. Touch of Evil would also receive the International Critics Prize, and Welles was recognized for his body of work.

==== Critical re-evaluation ====
In 1998, Roger Ebert added Touch of Evil to his Great Movies list. He praised the lead and supporting actors and argued that the cinematography was "not simply showing off" but rather was used to add depth to the complex plot by showing interpersonal connections and "trapping [the characters] in the same shots". Ebert also speculated Welles's role was semi-autobiographical, describing his Quinlan character as nursing old feuds and demonstrating an obsessive desire for control that arguably parallels Welles's life and career. Todd McCarthy of Variety stated that although the restored film was virtually the same, he noted the film's plot is more coherent and that "due to the pristine new print, Welles' technical virtuosity and ingenious use of locations have never been more evident, and the entire picture plays more smoothly." Peter Stack of the San Francisco Chronicle wrote "Touch of Evil is a savvy starter because Welles' astonishing cinematic invention and his persuasive presence as star are prime noir attractions. The look, a deftly arranged climate of odd shadows and angles, neon lighting and flawlessly choreographed action scenes, keeps interest piqued through a contrived plot and mannered acting." Pauline Kael lauded the film: " ... this marvellously garish thriller has something, but not very much, to do with drugs and police corruption in a border town. What it really has to do with is love of the film medium, and if Welles can't resist the candy of shadows and angles and baroque decor, he turns it into stronger fare than most directors' solemn meat and potatoes. It's a terrific entertainment."

Michael Wilmington of the Chicago Tribune positively wrote the film was "close to the pinnacle of film noir" thanks to "[w]izardly moving camera shots, nightmarish angles and incredibly florid, amusing performances". Kenneth Turan, reviewing for the Los Angeles Times, summarized the 1998 re-cut: "Photographed by Russell Metty, Touch of Evil is one of the standard-bearers for the kind of eye-catching, bravura camera work Welles favored. Expressionistic in the extreme, filled with shadows, angles and cinematic flourishes, the film raises the usual brooding nightmare ambience of film noir to a level few other pictures have attempted." In 2015, Peter Bradshaw of The Guardian gave it 5/5 stars. In 2012, critic Manohla Dargis listed Touch of Evil as one of her ten favourite films of all time on 2012 Sight & Sound critics' poll list.

Eddie Muller writing about this late noir: "Touch of Evil is noir as a three-ring circus. There are high-wire acts (the dazzling moving camera shot that opens the film), sleight-of-hand tricks (the single-take interrogation of Manolo Sanchez), outrageous clowns (Akim Tamiroff and Dennis Weaver), scary animal acts (the Grandi boys' torture of Susie), and clever disguises (Joseph Cotten, Mercedes McCambridge, Zsa Zsa Gabor, and Marlene Dietrich all have masquerade cameos). Welles capably plays both ringleader and elephant."

On the review aggregator website Rotten Tomatoes, the film received an approval rating of 96% based on 85 reviews, with an average rating of 9.40/10. The critical consensus reads, "Artistically innovative and emotionally gripping, Orson Welles' classic noir is a visual treat, as well as a dark, sinister thriller." On Metacritic, the film has a weighted average score of 99 out of 100, based on 22 critics, indicating "universal acclaim".

In 1998, Time Out magazine conducted a poll and the film was voted 57th greatest film of all time. In 2000, the film was ranked at No. 55 in The Village Voice's 100 Greatest Films list. Touch of Evil was placed No. 64 on American Film Institute's "100 Years, 100 Thrills" list in 2001.

In the Sight & Sound Greatest Films of All Time 2012 poll, the film was placed No. 26 and No. 57 by the directors and the critics respectively. In 2015, the film ranked 51st on BBC's "100 Greatest American Films" list, voted on by film critics from around the world. Touch of Evil was placed at number 108 in the Sight and Sound Greatest Films of All Time 2022 critic's poll, tying with Wild Strawberries, The Wizard of Oz, The Man Who Shot Liberty Valance, and Bringing Up Baby. In 2013, Touch of Evil was named the third best noir film of all time in an article for The Guardian. In 2016, the Directors Guild of America ranked the film 74th on its list of The 80 Best-Directed Films since the Guild’s founding in 1936.

Henry Mancini's soundtrack album, released by Challenge Records in 1958, was ranked at number 405 in Uncut's 2025 list of "The 500 Greatest Albums of the 1950s"; contributor Peter Watts noted how Mancini's "opulent and evocative" music "introduced a theme of pulsating Afro-Cuban percussion, swinging Mexican rhythms and jump blues alongside Mancini's trademark strut."

=== Restorations ===
==== 1976 release ====
Robert Epstein, a UCLA film studies professor, had requested a film print for a screening in his class in the early 1970s. Inside the Universal archives, he discovered a 108-minute print of Touch of Evil. It was publicly screened at the Los Angeles County Museum of Art as part of "The 50 Great American Films" on December 15, 1973. The American Film Institute, recognizing the historical value of the discovery, had submitted a duplicated negative to the Library of Congress for preservation in June 1975. A 16 mm re-release provided through United World Films, Universal Pictures' non-theatrical distribution arm, was also discussed. Subsequently, it was screened at the Paris Film Festival, which was followed with a wide theatrical re-release by Universal Pictures that recognized an increased interest among film fans in Welles's works.

Jonathan Rosenbaum published an article in the film magazine Sight & Sound in 1975, claiming that, except for a few minor details, the version was "apparently identical to Welles' final cut," and described it as the "definitive version". Joseph McBride, in a letter to Sight & Sound, issued a correction, identifying the cut as the "preview" version.

==== 1998 release ====
In 1998, Walter Murch, working from all available material, re-edited the film based on the Welles memo, with Rick Schmidlin who produced the re-edit and with the help of Bob O'Neil, Universal's director of film restoration and Bill Varney, Universal's Vice President of Sound Operations, participating in the restoration. As Welles's rough cut no longer exists, no true "director's cut" is possible but Murch was able to assemble a version incorporating most of the existing material, omitting some of the Keller scenes (though some were retained, either because they had replaced Welles's lost scenes and were necessary to the plot or because Welles had approved of their inclusion). Some of Welles's complaints concerned subtle sound and editing choices and Murch re-edited the material accordingly. Notable changes include the removal of the credits and Henry Mancini's music from the opening sequence, cross-cutting between the main story and Janet Leigh's subplot and the removal of Harry Keller's hotel lobby scene. Rick Schmidlin produced the 1998 edit, which had a limited but successful theatrical release (again by Universal) and was subsequently made available on DVD. The DVD includes an on-screen reproduction of the 58-page memo.

Originally scheduled to be premiered at the 1998 Cannes Film Festival with Janet Leigh, Walter Murch and Rick Schmidlin attending, the screening was canceled at the eleventh hour after threats of litigation from Welles's daughter, Beatrice Welles. Her suit against Universal, for not consulting her or obtaining her consent prior to the reworking of Touch of Evil, was settled out of court. Welles later said she had only asked Universal to inform her on what was being done and when she was ignored, she told the Cannes Festival that the restoration was not sanctioned by the Welles Estate,

I saw it later and it was wonderful...I thought they did an amazing job, and it was very well done. It was what he wanted and it made much more sense than that chopped up nightmare there was before. It was fine and it was his. If they had told me that from the very beginning, none of that would have happened.

The 1998 re-edit received awards from the New York Film Critics Circle, the Los Angeles Film Critics Association and National Society of Film Critics.

=== Home media ===
The home media release history of Touch of Evil is summarized in the following table. The film was shot in the fullscreen Academy ratio with Welles reportedly composing his shots primarily with the newer 1.85:1 widescreen aspect ratio in mind, which Universal applied to all its new films using a hard matte. Universal preserved Academy ratio prints of the film for later broadcast on television. Both formats of the film have been released to home media.

Released	Publisher	Aspect Ratio	Cut	Runtime	Commentaries	Resolution	Master	Medium
September 25, 2023	Eureka!	1.85:1	Theatrical	1h 36m	F.X. Feeney (2008 Universal track)	2160p	8K	Blu-ray
September 25, 2023	Eureka!	1.85:1	Preview	1h 49m	James Naremore with Jonathan Rosenbaum (2008)	2160p	8K	Blu-ray
September 25, 2023	Eureka!	1.85:1	Reconstruction	1h 51m	Rick Schmidlin (1998), Charlton Heston with Janet Leigh and Rick Schmidlin (1998)	2160p	8K	Blu-ray
March 8, 2022	Kino Lorber	1.85:1	Theatrical	1h 36m	Tim Lucas, F.X. Feeney (2008 Universal track)	2160p	4K	Blu-ray
March 8, 2022	Kino Lorber	1.85:1	Preview	1h 49m	James Naremore with Jonathan Rosenbaum (2008)	2160p	4K	Blu-ray
March 8, 2022	Kino Lorber	1.85:1	Reconstruction	1h 51m	Imogen Sara Smith, Charlton Heston with Janet Leigh and Rick Schmidlin (1998)	2160p	4K	Blu-ray
April 15, 2014	Universal	1.85:1	Theatrical	1h 36m	F.X. Feeney (2008 Universal track)	1080p	2K	Blu-ray
April 15, 2014	Universal	1.85:1	Preview	1h 49m	James Naremore with Jonathan Rosenbaum (2008)	1080p	2K	Blu-ray
April 15, 2014	Universal	1.85:1	Reconstruction	1h 51m	Charlton Heston with Janet Leigh and Rick Schmidlin (1998)	1080p	2K	Blu-ray
January 10, 2012	Universal	1.85:1	Reconstruction	1h 51m	none	480i	NTSC	DVD
November 14, 2011	Eureka!	1.37:1	Theatrical	1h 36m	F.X. Feeney (2008 Universal track)	1080p	2K	Blu-ray
November 14, 2011	Eureka!	1.85:1	Theatrical	1h 36m	F.X. Feeney (2008 Universal track)	1080p	2K	Blu-ray
November 14, 2011	Eureka!	1.85.1	Preview	1h 49m	James Naremore with Jonathan Rosenbaum (2008)	1080p	2K	Blu-ray
November 14, 2011	Eureka!	1.37:1	Reconstruction	1h 51m	Rick Schmidlin (1998), Charlton Heston with Janet Leigh and Rick Schmidlin (1998)	1080p	2K	Blu-ray
November 14, 2011	Eureka!	1.85:1	Reconstruction	1h 51m	Rick Schmidlin (1998), Charlton Heston with Janet Leigh and Rick Schmidlin (1998)	1080p	2K	Blu-ray
October 7, 2008	Universal	1.85:1	Theatrical	1h 36m	F.X. Feeney	480i	NTSC	DVD
October 7, 2008	Universal	1.85:1	Preview	1h 49m	James Naremore with Jonathan Rosenbaum	480i	NTSC	DVD
October 7, 2008	Universal	1.85:1	Reconstruction	1h 51m	Rick Schmidlin (1998)	480i	NTSC	DVD
October 31, 2000	Universal	1.85:1	Reconstruction	1h 51m	Rick Schmidlin, Charlton Heston with Janet Leigh and Rick Schmidlin	480i	NTSC	DVD
October 31, 2000	Universal	1.37:1	Reconstruction	1h 51m	none	240 lines	NTSC	VHS
April 28, 1998	Universal	1.37:1	Theatrical	1h 35m	none	240 lines	NTSC	VHS
March 1987	MCA Home Video	1.33:1	Preview	1h 48m	none	425 lines	NTSC	LaserDisc

== See also ==
- List of American films of 1958
- List of cult films
