= The American Cinema (book) =

1968 book of film criticism by Andrew Sarris

- First edition cover
- Author: Andrew Sarris
- Language: English
- Subject: Auteur theory of filmmaking
- Publisher: E. P. Dutton
- Publication date: 1968
- Publication place: United States
- Media type: Print (hardcover, paperback)
- Pages: 383

The American Cinema: Directors and Directions, 1929–1968 is a 1968 book by film critic Andrew Sarris. It applies the auteur theory to classify and rank over 200 directors who had worked in the United States since the advent of the sound era. In Sarris's prior essays and reviews for Film Culture and The Village Voice, he had introduced American moviegoers to the French concept of auteur directors. The American Cinema allowed him to expound on the concept in book-length form.

The book was not a bestseller but it found a passionate audience. A number of future filmmakers said it inspired them to pursue their careers. The book also evoked strongly negative reactions, spearheaded by film critic Pauline Kael, who considered the auteur theory, and Sarris's defense of it, a faulty criteria for judging films which led to wrongheaded assessments of past work.

== Background ==
Sarris spent a year in Paris in the 1950s where he befriended French New Wave filmmakers, and early auteur advocates, François Truffaut and Jean-Luc Godard. Back in the U.S., Sarris edited the English-language edition of the French film magazine, Cahiers du Cinéma. It championed the notion, as expressed in the writings of André Bazin and others, that great directors, even if they do not write or produce their films, still place a personal stamp of "authorship" on each work.

In his seminal essay, "Notes on the Auteur Theory in 1962", published in Film Culture magazine, Sarris translated Truffaut's phrase la politique des auteurs into the term "auteur theory", which is how the concept came to be known. In spring of 1963, in a special "American Directors" issue of Film Culture, Sarris produced a much lengthier, more in-depth "auteur theory" article titled "The American Cinema". It was his first published attempt to rank directors by their degree of "auteurism", and contained a large portion of what would become his 1968 book.

In the 1962 essay, Sarris had warned of facile usage of the theory: "Unfortunately, some critics have embraced the auteur theory as a short-cut to film scholarship. With a 'you-see-it-or-you-don't' attitude toward the reader, the particularly lazy auteur critic can save himself the drudgery of communication and explanation. Indeed, at their worst, auteur critiques are less meaningful than the straightforward plot reviews which pass for criticism in America." The American Cinema offered him an expansive platform to demonstrate the detailed analysis he felt was "indispensable for sound auteur criticism".

== Book summary ==
The book is divided into three main sections:

=== "Toward a Theory of Film History" ===
In the introductory essay, "Toward a Theory of Film History", Sarris explains the auteur theory that governs the rest of the book. He argues that "the personality of the best directors shine through in their films", saying at one point: "The strong director imposes his own personality on a film; the weak director allows the personality of others to run rampant."

In another passage, he describes how a director's style can enhance a film's subject matter:

The art of the cinema is the art of an attitude, the style of a gesture. It is not so much what as how. The what is some aspect of reality rendered mechanically by the camera. The how is what the French critics designate somewhat mystically as mise-en-scène. Auteur criticism is a reaction against sociological criticism that enthroned the what against the how. However, it would be equally fallacious to enthrone the how against the what. The whole point of a meaningful style is that it unifies the what and the how into a personal statement.

Sarris believed that a keen-eyed cinephile could discern the distinctive mark of a Douglas Sirk-directed film or a Budd Boetticher-directed film or a Raoul Walsh-directed film, almost like a painter's signature on a painting, and that auteur directors were able to leave their unique imprints on their work even while operating within the constraints of the Hollywood studio system.

=== Ranked categories of directors ===
This section comprises the bulk of the book. In the first chapter, Sarris lists what he terms the "Pantheon" of the 14 greatest film directors, all of whom worked at some point in the U.S., and who had "transcended their technical problems with a personal vision of the world." The list includes Americans (Robert Flaherty, John Ford, D. W. Griffith, Howard Hawks, Buster Keaton, and Orson Welles), Germans/Austrians (Fritz Lang, Ernst Lubitsch, F. W. Murnau, Max Ophüls, and Josef von Sternberg), British (Charles Chaplin and Alfred Hitchcock), and French (Jean Renoir).

For each "Pantheon" director, Sarris provides a several-page writeup that enumerates the director's filmography while also describing specific techniques that illustrate the director's style. For instance, Sarris notes Hitchcock's tendency to invest physical objects with ominous or sinister significance, citing the missing finger in The 39 Steps, the reverse-sailing windmills in Foreign Correspondent, the glass of milk in Suspicion, the wine-cellar key in Notorious, the crashing cymbals in both versions of The Man Who Knew Too Much, the motel shower in Psycho, and the telephone booth in The Birds. In Sarris's judgment, this repeating motif is part of what makes Hitchcock's work recognizable, and represents evidence of his authorship.

In the next chapter, "The Far Side of Paradise", Sarris names second-tier directors "who fall short of the Pantheon either because of a fragmentation of their personal vision or because of disruptive career problems". Each of these entries—which include such names as Frank Capra, George Cukor, Vincente Minnelli, Otto Preminger, George Stevens, and Preston Sturges—is also given a filmography and short writeup.

In a series of controversial chapters, Sarris denigrates the work of many celebrated, award-winning directors. For example, he categorizes John Huston, Elia Kazan, David Lean, Billy Wilder, William Wyler, and Fred Zinneman under "Less Than Meets the Eye". He places Richard Brooks, John Frankenheimer, Norman Jewison, Stanley Kubrick, Sidney Lumet, Robert Rossen, John Schlesinger, and Robert Wise under "Strained Seriousness".

The remaining chapters—with titles such as "Lightly Likable", "Oddities, One-Shots, and Newcomers", and "Subjects for Further Research"—iterate through more categories of directors, sometimes with only a few sentences to summarize and grade the director's career.

=== Director-oriented lists of English-language films ===
At the end of the book, Sarris supplies two long lists of over 6,000 English-language films. The first is a year-by-year chronology, starting in 1915, of films released and their associated directors. The second, compiled with the aid of Michael Schwartz and James R. Prickett, is an alphabetized listing of film titles, printed along with the year of the film's release and its director. In combination, these lists present a director-centric view of movie history up to 1968.

== Reception ==
Initial reviews of The American Cinema called attention to the book's provocative nature. In The New York Times, Roger Greenspun offered this encapsulation of auteur theory: "a movie does have an 'author', usually its director, who if he is good will impose a personal style." Greenspun predicted the book would shock some readers, given Sarris's willingness to tear down the reputations of well-known directors, while heaping praise on unfamiliar ones. In Film Society Review, Jonathan Rosenbaum said he had disagreements with the book in the areas of scope, categories, consistency, and criteria. Nevertheless, he believed it would be a "pioneering catalogue-guide to the American cinema" and that many of Sarris's thumbnail descriptions of hundreds of films "reveal more about movies than we originally thought was there".

In a review in Commentary magazine, Paul Warshow faulted Sarris and other auteur critics for being

both dogmatic and arbitrary in deciding who is an auteur and who isn't.... To put it more crudely, but only a little unfairly, directors are either In or Out.... Although the auteur critics do make distinctions within the work of particular directors, a kind of stigma is automatically attached to even the best films of a director who is not an auteur just as, conversely, even the worst films of an auteur are redeemed by their significance within the oeuvre and by the apparently unmistakable stamp upon them of the auteur's style and personality.

Sarris's advocacy of the auteur theory triggered debates with notable writers and film critics, including Gore Vidal, Dwight Macdonald, and John Simon. Vidal complained that auteurism led to "the deification of directors over writers in the moviemaking process". Sarris's most public feud was with Pauline Kael. It began in 1963 in the pages of Film Quarterly, and continued past the publication of The American Cinema. She derided his methodology of ranking directors in importance, and categorizing and sub-categorizing them, calling him a "list queen". According to Kael, his theory that a film should express its director's personal vision—and his determination to make film history fit his theory—resulted in absurd, misguided opinions about past works. For instance, Sarris's contention that "the distinguishable personality of the director is a criterion of value" led him to undervalue several John Huston-directed films with Humphrey Bogart such as The Maltese Falcon, The Treasure of the Sierra Madre, and The African Queen (or to dismiss them as "actors' classics") because they did not exhibit, in Sarris's estimation, a director's unique touch.

The controversies stirred by The American Cinema prompted Sarris to clarify and qualify what he meant. In some of his later remarks he seemed to backtrack, for example, he wrote in a 1970 Film Comment article: "The auteur theory was therefore never a theory at all, but rather a collection of facts, a reminder of movies to be resurrected, of genres to be redeemed, of directors to be rediscovered." However, he still delivered spirited defenses of the theory, such as in a 1972 interview when he stated that the auteur perspective was necessary to appreciate directors like Howard Hawks, "whom no one had ever said anything about – and people like John Ford, and the totally neglected directors who built up large bodies of work that nobody paid any attention to."

== Legacy ==
The American Cinema has been called a landmark book of film criticism and "the bible of the auteur theory." Da Capo Press issued a new paperback edition in 1996. This edition contained an additional essay, "The Auteur Theory Revisited", that Sarris wrote for American Film journal in 1977.

In 2001, Emanuel Levy edited an anthology of essays paying tribute to Sarris. In the section about his "magnum opus", The American Cinema, a group of filmmakers and critics—among them John Sayles, Phillip Lopate, Leonard Maltin, and Kenneth Turan—all testified to the importance the book had on their understanding and love of film. Kent Jones wrote of Sarris in 2005: "If you received The American Cinema at the right moment in your life, and many people including myself did, it came with the force of a divination, a cinematic Great Awakening." Jones added that by persuasively arguing "it was the director rather than the writer or the performers from whom the final result [film] was generated", Sarris had daringly achieved "a systematic destruction and reconstruction of the standard view of American cinema and, by extension, all of cinema".

In the decades since 1968, even with the arrival of competing approaches to film criticism, the auteur theory has persisted, and much of the reason for it is attributed to Sarris's book. In 2010, Sight & Sound magazine published a British Film Institute poll of the top five film books of all time; The American Cinema tied for second place.

== See also ==
- Auteur
