= Orson Welles filmography =

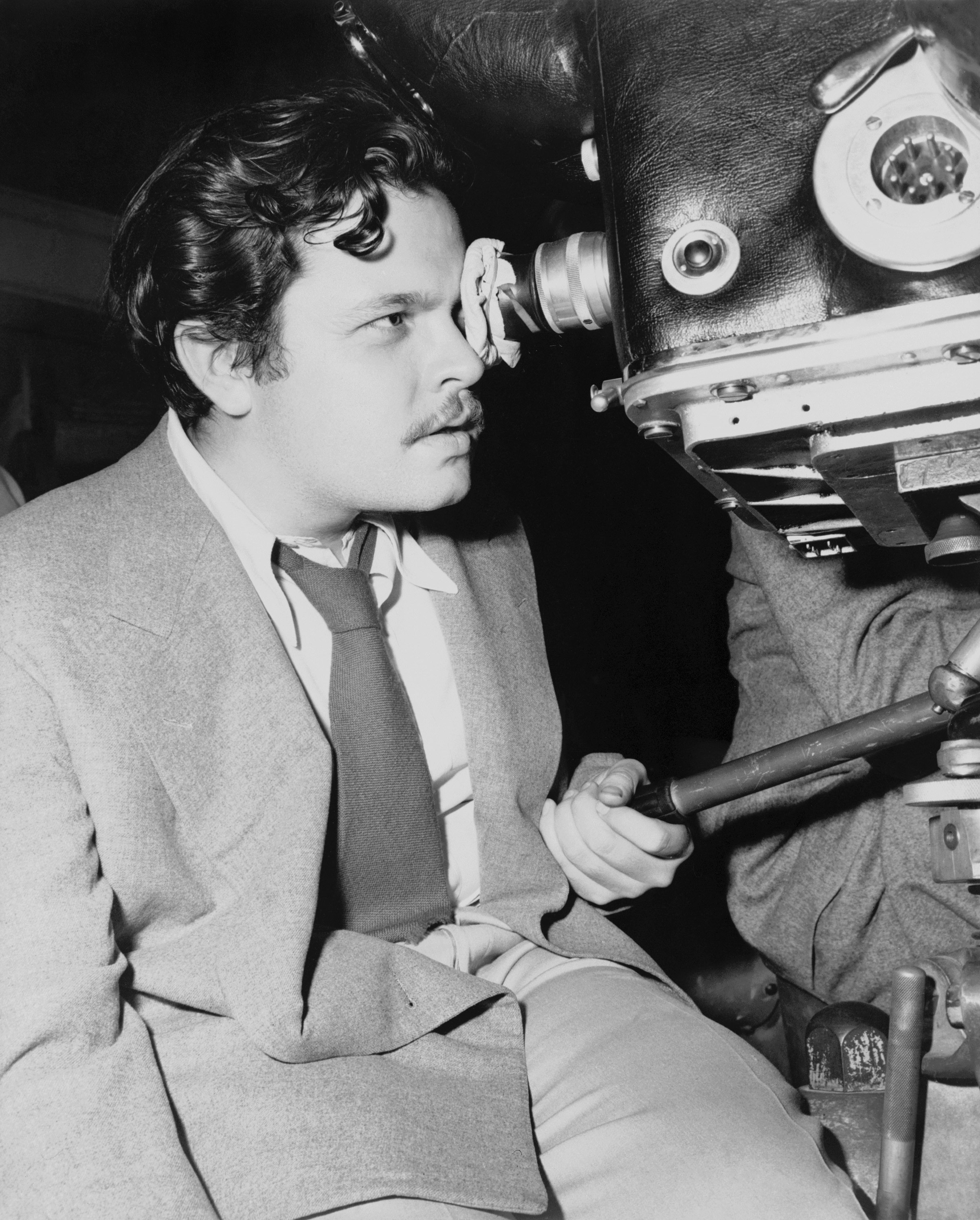
Orson Welles at work on The Magnificent Ambersons (1942)

Orson Welles (1915–1985) was an American director, actor, writer, and producer who is best remembered for his innovative work in radio, theatre and film. He is widely considered one of the greatest and most influential filmmakers of all time.

While in his twenties, Welles directed a number of stage productions before creating the infamous 1938 radio adaptation of H. G. Wells's novel The War of the Worlds. Welles's directorial film debut Citizen Kane (1941), in which he also starred as Charles Foster Kane, garnered him the Academy Award for Best Original Screenplay and nominations for Best Actor and Best Director. The film is consistently ranked as the greatest film ever made. Welles's second film was The Magnificent Ambersons (1942), which he wrote and directed. He worked as actor, screenwriter, uncredited producer and uncredited co-director of 1943's Journey Into Fear, and directed and co-starred in 1946's The Stranger, his only substantial commercial success as a director. He then directed and starred in the film-noir The Lady from Shanghai (1947), appearing opposite his estranged wife Rita Hayworth.

His 1951 film Othello won the Palme d'Or at the Cannes Film Festival. In 1958, Universal-International released the Welles-directed Touch of Evil, in which he also starred alongside Charlton Heston and Janet Leigh. His The Trial (1962) received a nomination for the Golden Lion at the Venice Film Festival. He subsequently directed Chimes at Midnight (1966), in which he also starred as Falstaff. Welles's last completed features were the essay films F for Fake (1973) and Filming Othello (1978). Throughout his career, he also worked on numerous films which he abandoned due to legal issues, lack of funds, or loss of interest and which were never completed or released. Two of these unfinished feature films have been completed and released posthumously: Don Quixote (1992) and The Other Side of the Wind (2018). However, many of Welles's other projects are now considered lost films.

Welles also had a successful career as an actor, appearing in dozens of films. In 1937, he collaborated with Ernest Hemingway on The Spanish Earth. In 1943, he starred opposite Joan Fontaine in Jane Eyre. His first appearance as Harry Lime in the 1949 film-noir The Third Man was heralded as "the most famous entrance in the history of the movies" by Roger Ebert. Also in 1949 he played Cesare Borgia in the film Prince of Foxes. In 1956, he appeared as Father Mapple in the John Huston-directed Moby Dick. His performance in Compulsion (1959) earned him the Cannes Film Festival Award for Best Actor. Welles starred as Le Chiffre in the James Bond film Casino Royale (1967). He portrayed Louis XVIII in Waterloo (1970). In 1979, he appeared in The Muppet Movie. His performance in Butterfly (1982) garnered him a nomination for the Golden Globe Award for Best Supporting Actor. Welles also narrated several documentaries, television series, and films, including King of Kings (1961), Bugs Bunny: Superstar (1975), and Mel Brooks's comedy film History of the World, Part I (1981).

Welles was granted an Academy Honorary Award for his works in 1971. Four years later, he became the third recipient of the American Film Institute's Life Achievement Award. In 1983, two years prior to his death, Welles received the Directors Guild of America Lifetime Achievement Award.

== Production ==
=== Completed feature films ===
Table featuring completed feature films by Orson Welles
Year	Title	Credited as			Notes	Ref.
Year	Title	Director	Writer	Producer	Notes	Ref.
1941	Citizen Kane	Yes	Yes	Yes	Co-written with Herman J. Mankiewicz	
1942	The Magnificent Ambersons	Yes	Yes	Yes	Also Uncredited cinematographer	
1943	Journey into Fear	Uncredited	Yes	Uncredited	Director of additional scenes; co-written with Joseph Cotten	
1946	The Stranger	Yes	Uncredited	No	Co-written with Anthony Veiller andJohn Huston	
1947	The Lady from Shanghai	Yes	Yes	Yes	Co-written with William Castle,Charles Lederer,Fletcher Markle	
1948	Macbeth	Yes	Uncredited	Yes	Also uncredited set designer	
1951	Othello	Yes	Yes	Yes		
1955	Mr. Arkadin	Yes	Yes	Yes	Also art director, costume designer, and uncredited editor	
1958	Touch of Evil	Yes	Yes	No		
1962	The Trial	Yes	Yes	No	Also Uncredited editor	
1966	Chimes at Midnight	Yes	Yes	No	Also Costume designer	
1968	The Immortal Story	Yes	Yes	No	French TV movie released theatrically in some countries, including the US; co-written with Louise de Vilmorin	
1973	F for Fake	Yes	Yes	No	Documentary film; Also Uncredited editor; co-written with Oja Kodar	
1978	Filming Othello	Yes	Yes	No	Documentary film	
2018	The Other Side of the Wind	Yes	Yes	Yes	Originally shot between 1970 and 1976 • Completed and released posthumously; co-written with Oja Kodar; Also editor	
2020	Hopper/Welles	Yes	Unscripted	No	Documentary film released posthumously	

Table featuring completed short films by Orson Welles

=== Completed short films ===
Table featuring completed short films by Orson Welles
Year	Title	Credited as				Notes	Ref.
Year	Title	Director	Writer	Producer	Editor	Notes	Ref.
1933	Twelfth Night	Yes	No	No	No	Dress rehearsal of Welles's Todd School stage production	
1934	The Hearts of Age	Yes	No	No	No	Scenario	
1940	Citizen Kane trailer	Yes	Yes	No	No		
1953	Magic Trick	Yes	Yes	No	No		
1969	The Merchant of Venice	Yes	Yes	Yes	No		
1970	An Evening with Orson Welles	Yes	Yes	No	No	Six 30-minute recitations	
1976	F for Fake trailer	Yes	No	No	Yes		
1978	Orson Welles's Jeremiah	Yes	Yes	No	Yes		
1978	Unsung Heroes	Yes	Yes	No	Yes		
1984	The Spirit of Charles Lindbergh	Yes	Yes	Yes	Yes		

=== Completed television programs ===
Table featuring completed television programs by Orson Welles
Year	Title	Credited as			Notes	Ref.
Year	Title	Director	Writer	Producer	Notes	Ref.
1955	Orson Welles' Sketch Book	No	Yes	No	Series of commentaries	
1955	Around the World with Orson Welles	Yes	Yes	No	Series	
1956	Camille, the Naked Lady and the Musketeers	Yes	Yes	Yes	Also Designer • Music arranger • Unsold pilot • Lost	
1958	The Fountain of Youth	Yes	Yes	No	Also Designer • Music arranger	
1958	Portrait of Gina	Yes	Yes	No	Unsold pilot	
1961	Orson Welles on the Art of Bullfighting	Yes	Yes	No	Episode of UK series Tempo	
1964	In the Land of Don Quixote	Yes	No	Yes	Series • Filmed c. 1961 • Aired in 1964.	
1978	Filming Othello	Yes	Yes	No		
1979	The Orson Welles Show	Yes	Yes	No	Unsold pilot	

=== Film fragments for stage productions ===
Table featuring film fragments for stage productions by Orson Welles
Year	Title	Credited as				Notes	Ref.
Year	Title	Director	Writer	Producer	Editor	Notes	Ref.
1938	Too Much Johnson	Yes	Yes	Yes	Yes		
1939	The Green Goddess	Yes	No	No	No	Also actor • Prologue for a vaudeville program • Lost film	
1946	Around the World	Yes	Yes	Yes	Yes	Film component of Broadway production • Lost film	
1950	The Miracle of St. Anne	Yes	Yes	No	No	Film component of a stage production • Lost film	

=== Uncompleted films and television programs ===
Table featuring uncompleted films and television programs by Orson Welles
Year	Title	Credited as				Notes	Ref.
Year	Title	Director	Writer	Producer	Editor	Notes	Ref.
1941–1942	It's All True	Yes	Yes	Yes	No		
1950	An Evening With Orson Welles	Yes	No	No	No	Two vignettes from the German tour of Welles's stage show • Lost	
1955	"The Tragedy of Lurs"	Yes	Yes	No	No	Episode from the TV series Around the World with Orson Welles	
1955	Moby Dick—Rehearsed	Yes	No	No	No	Film version of Welles's London stage production	
1957–1972	Don Quixote	Yes	Yes	Yes	Yes		
1960	Orson Welles in Dublin	Yes	No	No	No		
1967	The Heroine	Yes	Yes	No	No		
1967–1970	The Deep	Yes	Yes	Yes	No		
1968	Vienna	Yes	No	Yes	No	Segment for the unfinished Orson's Bag TV special	
1968–1971	One Man Band	Yes	Yes	No	No	Also known as Orson Welles' London	
1981	Filming The Trial	Yes	Yes	No	Yes		
1980–1982	The Dreamers	Yes	Yes	No	Yes		
1976–1985	Orson Welles' Magic Show	Yes	Yes	Yes	Yes		
1985	King Lear	Yes	Yes	No	No	Test footage	

== Performance ==
=== Film ===
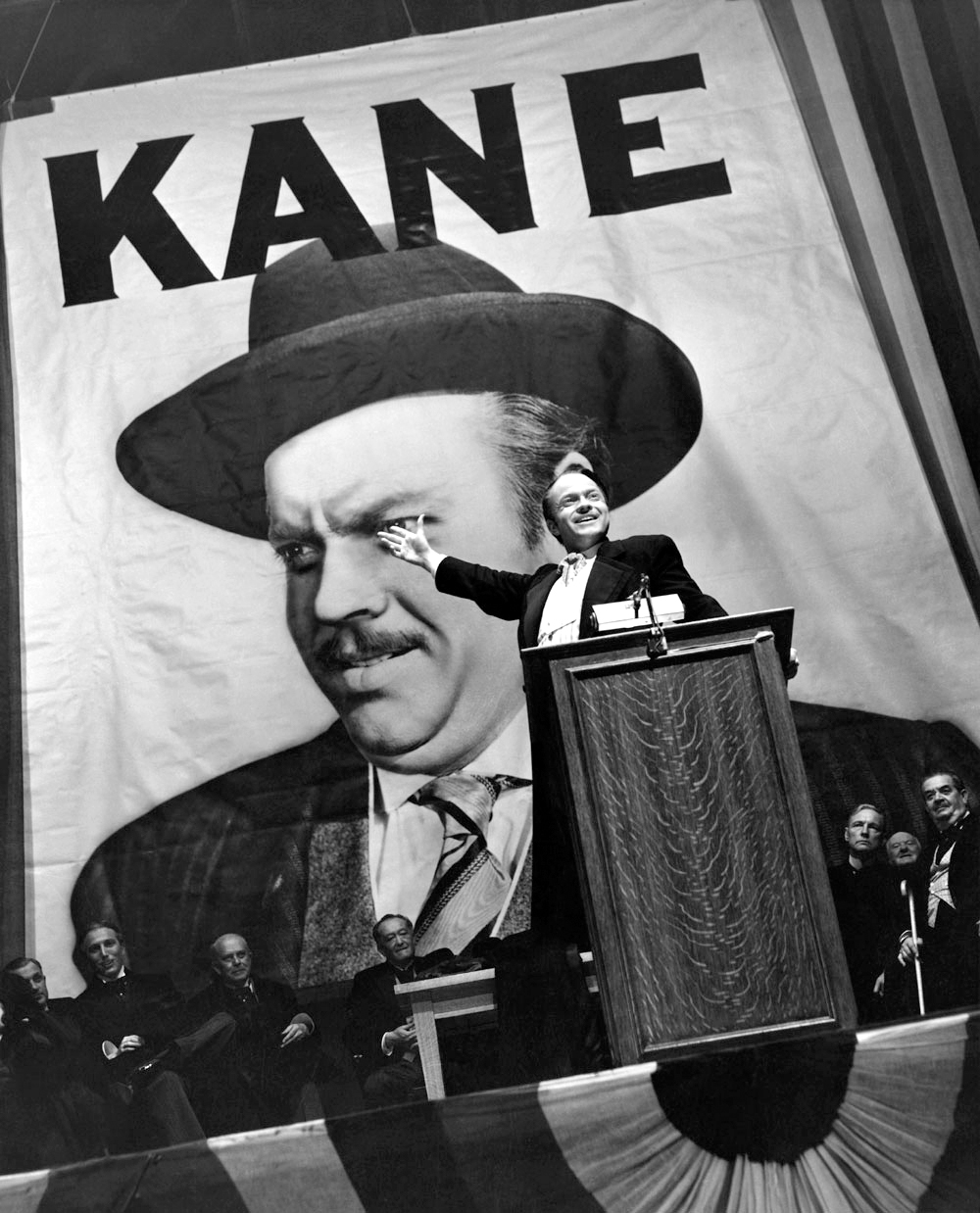
Welles in Citizen Kane (1941)

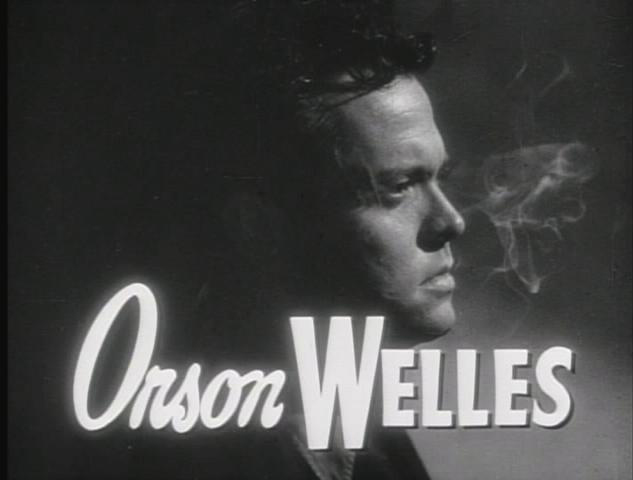
Welles in the trailer for The Lady from Shanghai (1947)

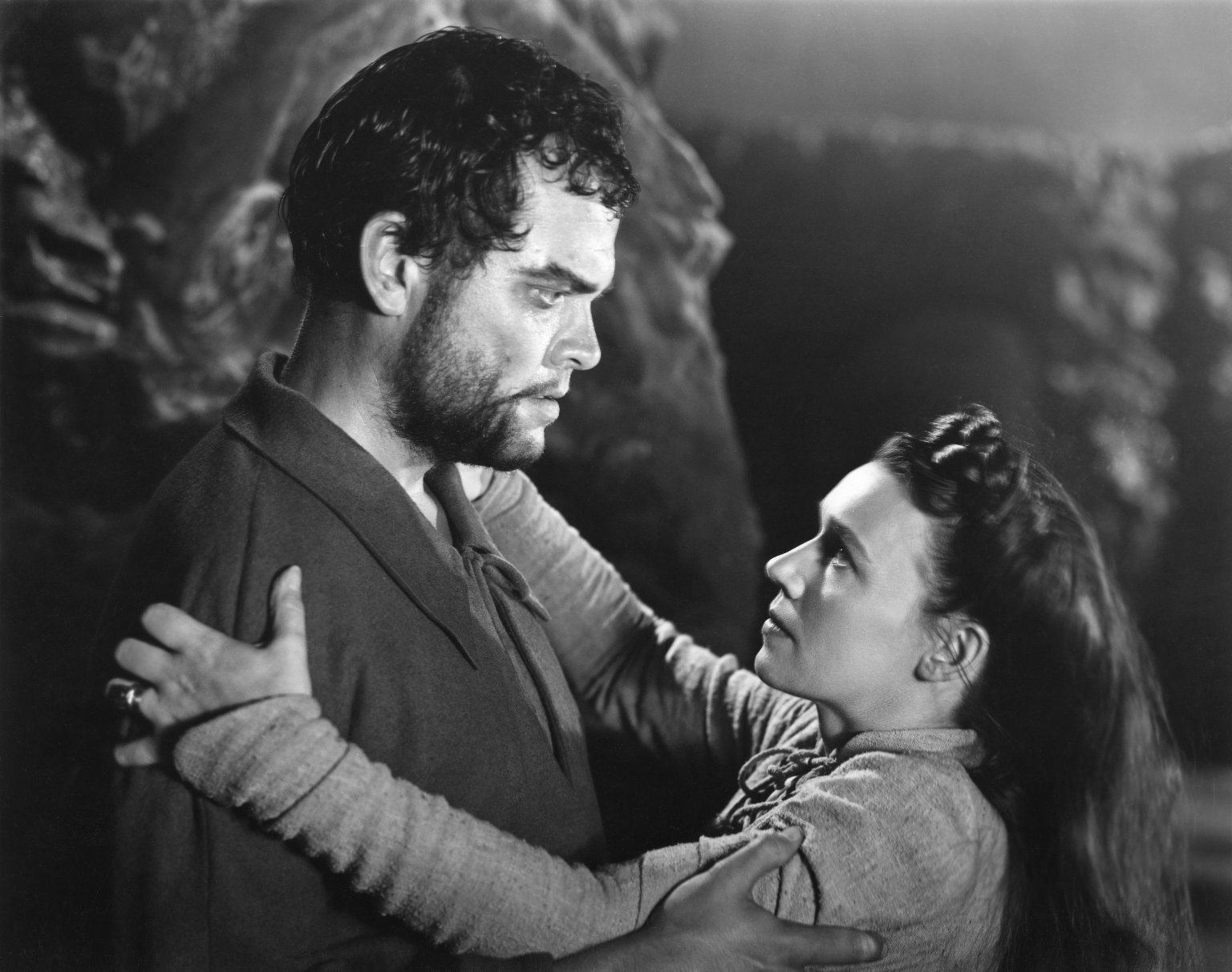
Welles as Macbeth in the eponymous Macbeth (1948)

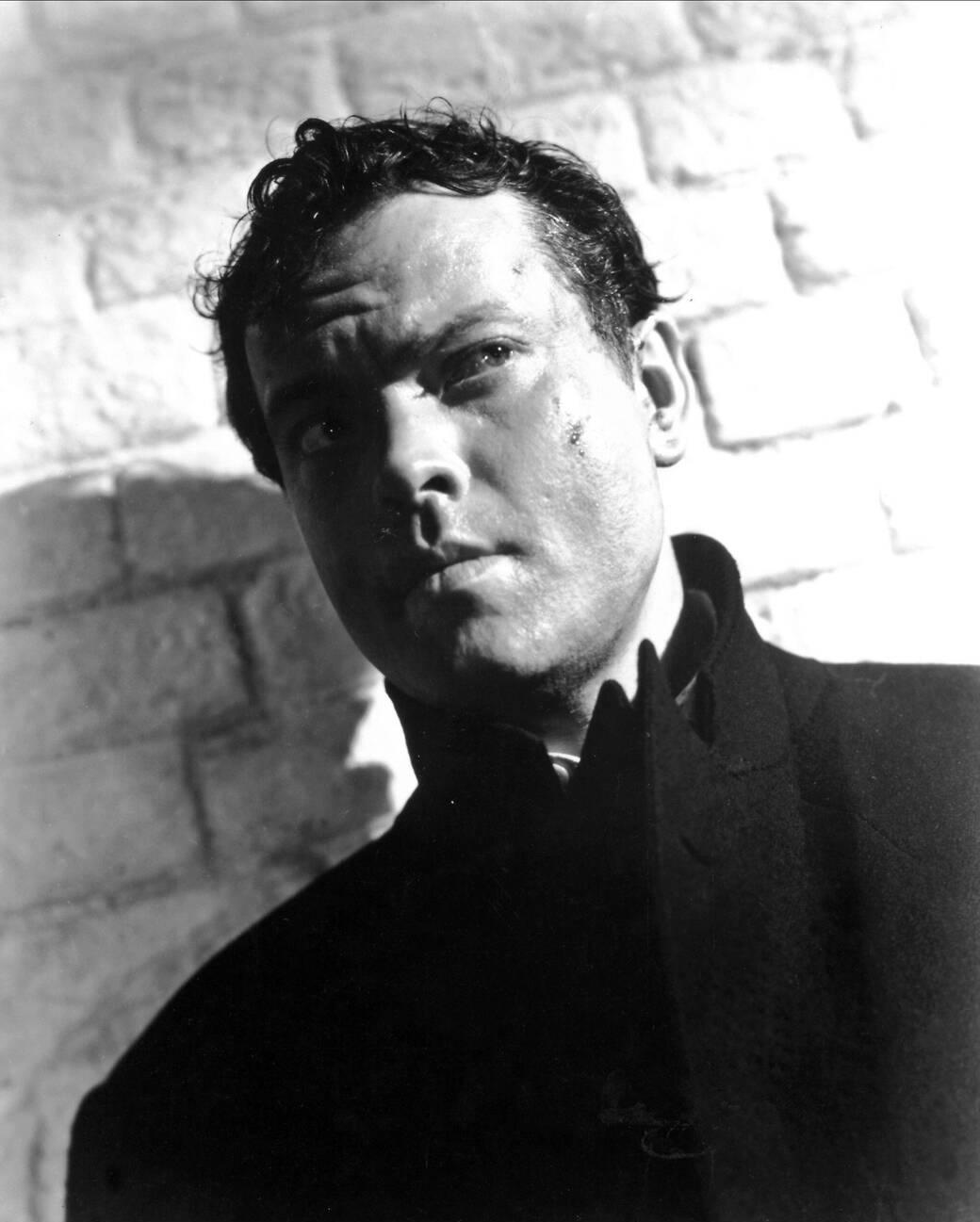
Welles as drug dealer Harry Lime in The Third Man (1949)

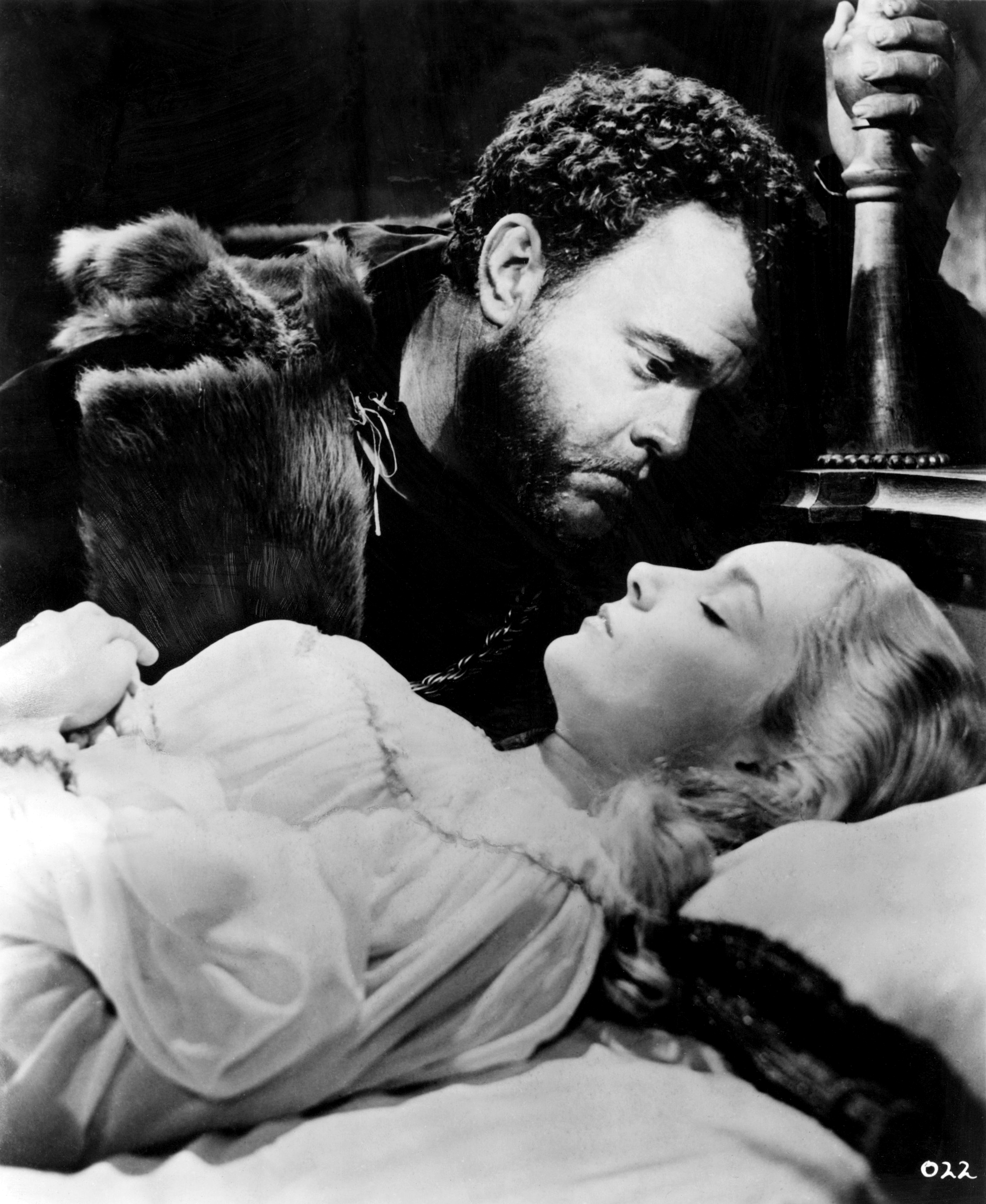
Welles with Suzanne Cloutier in Othello (1951)

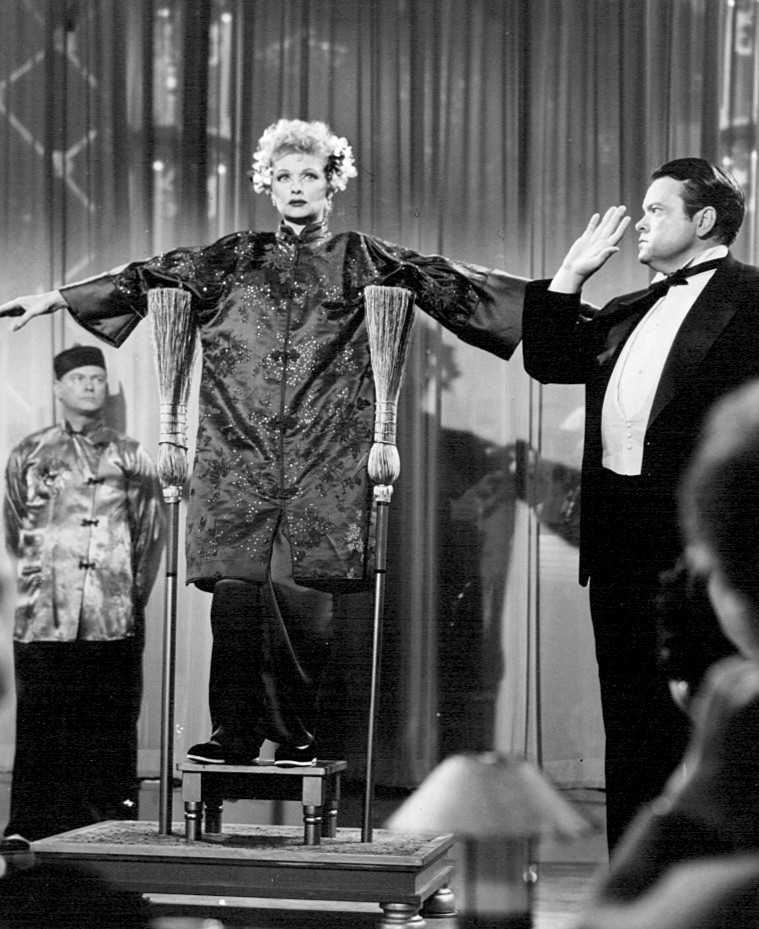
Welles (right) as a magician with Lucille Ball in I Love Lucy in 1956

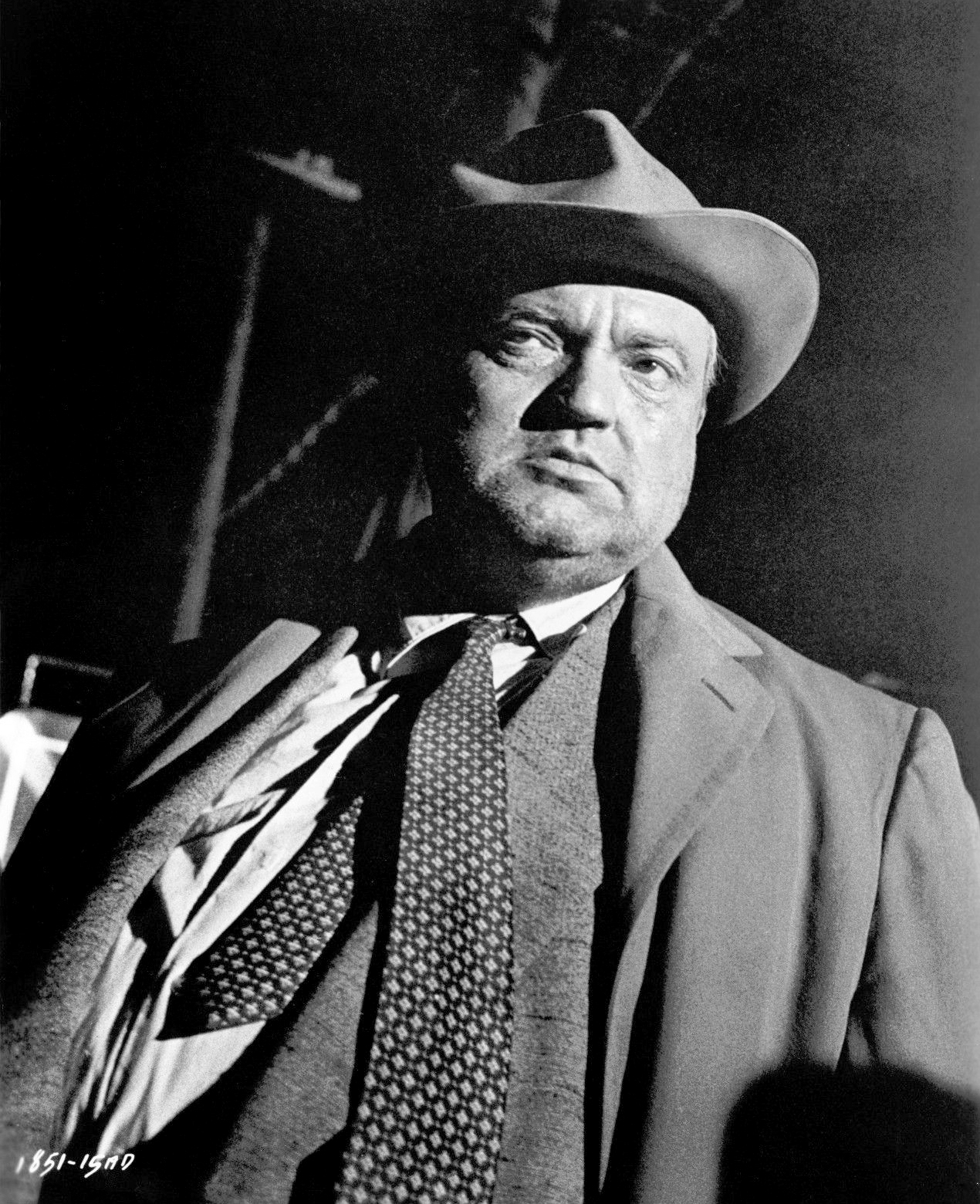
Welles in Touch of Evil (1958)

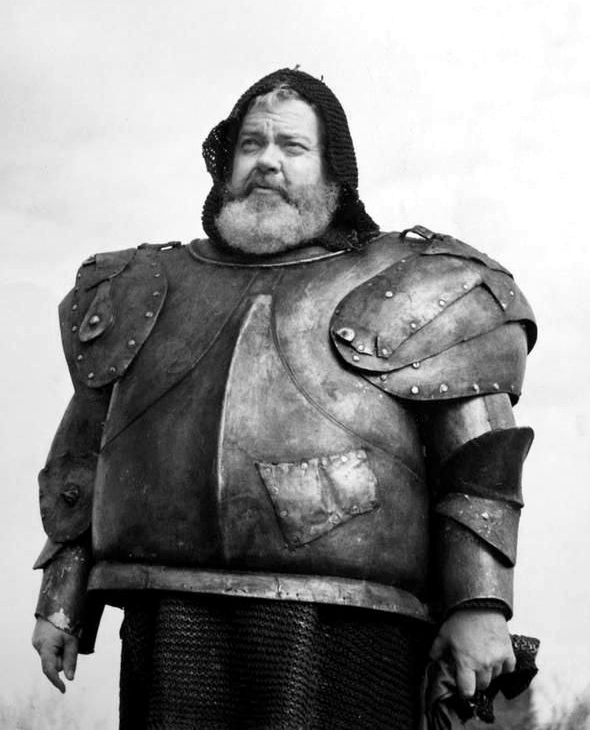
Welles as Falstaff in Chimes at Midnight (1965)

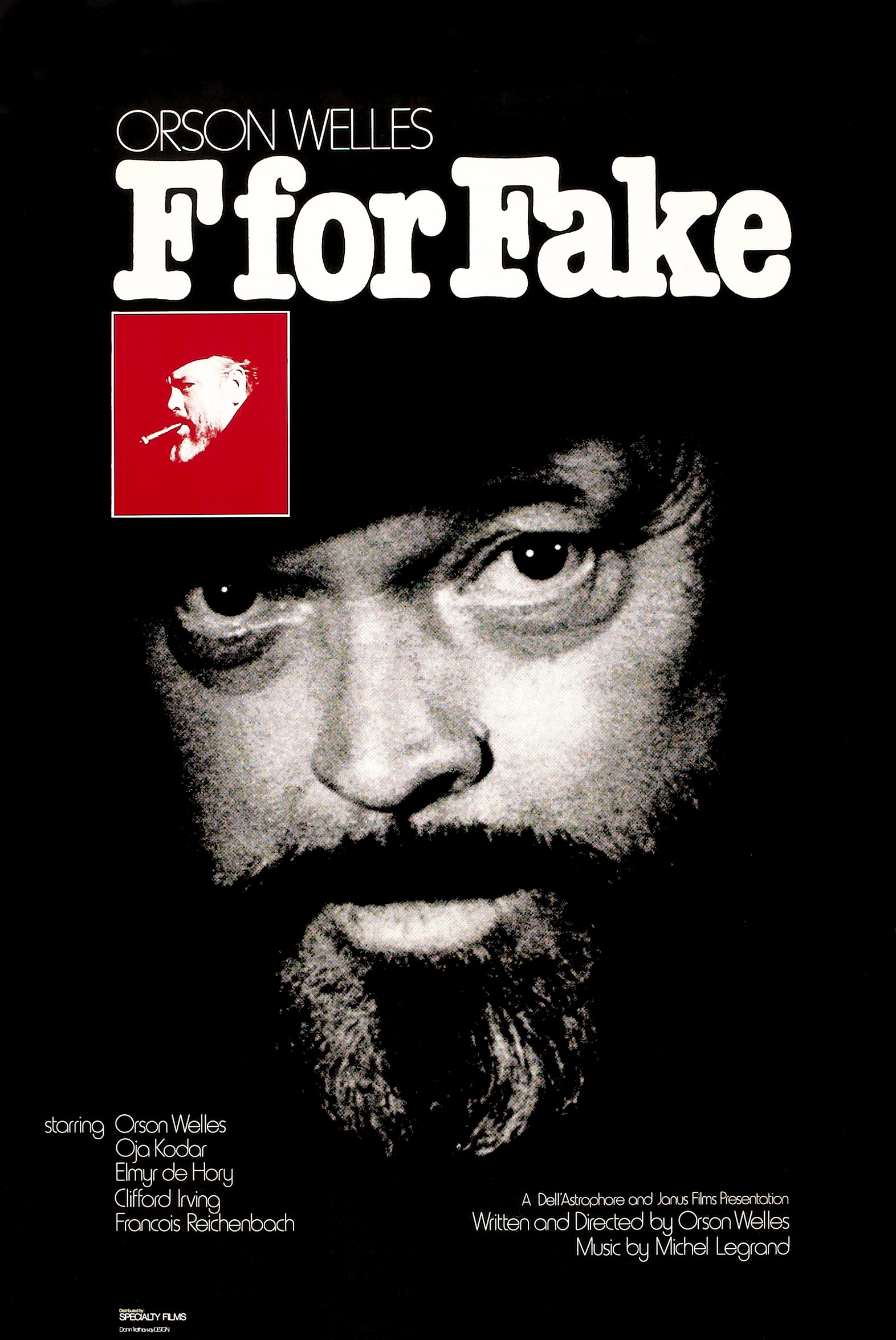
Welles on the poster for F for Fake (1973)

Table featuring films which Orson Welles appeared in
Year	Title	Role	Notes	Ref.
1937	The Spanish Earth	Narrator		
1940	Swiss Family Robinson	Narrator	Uncredited	
1941	Citizen Kane trailer	Himself	Short	
1941	Citizen Kane	Charles Foster Kane		
1942	Tanks	Narrator	Short documentary about the manufacture and use of the M–3 Army tank, distributed by the United States Office of War Information	
1942	The Magnificent Ambersons	Narrator		
1943	Journey into Fear	Colonel Haki		
1943	Jane Eyre	Edward Rochester	Also associate producer (uncredited)	
1943	Know Your Ally: Britain	Narrator/Bob (helpful taxi passenger)	Short film (uncredited)	
1944	Follow the Boys	Himself		
1945	Mexico City, Old and New	Narrator	Produced by the Office of the Coordinator of Inter-American Affairs and the Mexican Tourist Association	
1946	Tomorrow Is Forever	John MacDonald/Erich Kessler		
1946	The Stranger	Franz Kindler		
1946	Duel in the Sun	Narrator	Uncredited	
1947	The Lady from Shanghai	Michael O'Hara		
1948	Macbeth	Macbeth		
1949	Black Magic	Cagliostro/Josef Balsamo	Also director of his own scenes (uncredited)	
1949	The Third Man	Harry Lime	Also writer of some of his own dialogue (uncredited)	
1949	Prince of Foxes	Cesare Borgia		
1950	The Black Rose	Bayan		
1950	Disorder	Himself	Short film	
1951	Othello	Othello		
1951	Return to Glennascaul	Himself	Short film	
1952	Little World of Don Camillo	Voice of Christ	Also dubbing director, English-language version	
1952	Trent's Last Case	Sigsbee Manderson		
1953	Man, Beast and Virtue	Captain Perella		
1954	Royal Affairs in Versailles	Benjamin Franklin		
1954	Trouble in the Glen	Sanin Cejador y Mengues		
1955	Three Cases of Murder	Lord Mountdrago	"Mountdrago" segment Also director of his own scenes (uncredited)	
1955	Napoléon	Hudson Lowe		
1955	Mr. Arkadin	Gregory Arkadin		
1956	Moby Dick	Father Mapple		
1957	Man in the Shadow	Virgil Renchler		
1958	The Long, Hot Summer	Will Varner		
1958	Touch of Evil	Hank Quinlan		
1958	The Vikings	Narrator	Uncredited	
1958	South Seas Adventure	Narrator		
1958	The Roots of Heaven	Cy Sedgewick		
1959	Masters of the Congo Jungle	Narrator		
1959	Compulsion	Jonathan Wilk		
1959	Ferry to Hong Kong	Captain Cecil Hart		
1959	High Journey	Narrator		
1960	David and Goliath	King Saul	Also director of his own scenes (uncredited)	
1960	Crack in the Mirror	Hagolin/Lamerciere		
1960	Austerlitz	Robert Fulton		
1961	Lafayette	Benjamin Franklin		
1961	The Tartars	Burundai		
1961	King of Kings	Narrator		
1962	The Trial	Albert Hastler		
1962	River of the Ocean	Narrator		
1962	Ro.Go.Pa.G.	Film Director	"La ricotta" segment	
1963	The V.I.P.s	Max Buda		
1964	In the Land of Don Quixote	Himself		
1964	The Finest Hours	Narrator		
1965	A King's Story	Narrator		
1965	Marco the Magnificent	Ackermann		
1965	Chimes at Midnight	Sir John Falstaff		
1966	Is Paris Burning?	Consul Raoul Nordling		
1966	A Man for All Seasons	Cardinal Wolsey		
1967	Casino Royale	Le Chiffre		
1967	The Sailor from Gibraltar	Louis of Mozambique		
1967	I'll Never Forget What's'isname	Jonathan Lute		
1968	The Immortal Story	Mr. Clay, narrator		
1968	Oedipus the King	Tiresias		
1968	Around the World of Mike Todd	Narrator		
1968	House of Cards	Charles Leschenhaut		
1968–1969	The Last Roman	Emperor Justinian		
1969	Tepepa	Colonel Cascorro		
1969	The Southern Star	Plankett	Also director of the opening scenes (uncredited)	
1969	The Merchant of Venice	Shylock	Short film	
1969	12 + 1	Maurice Markau		
1969	Battle of Neretva	Chetnik senator		
1970	The Kremlin Letter	Bresnavitch		
1970	A Horse Called Nijinsky	Narrator		
1970	Start the Revolution Without Me	Narrator		
1970	Catch-22	General Dreedle		
1970	Salvador Dalí: A Soft Self-Portrait	Narrator		
1970	Waterloo	Louis XVIII		
1970	Is It Always Right to Be Right?	Narrator	Animated short film	
1970	To Build a Fire	Narrator		
1971	Malpertuis	Uncle Cassavius		
1971	A Safe Place	Magician		
1971	Ten Days' Wonder	Theo Van Horn		
1971	Freedom River	Narrator		
1971	Sentinels of Silence	Narrator	Short film	
1971	Directed by John Ford	Narrator		
1972	Necromancy	Mr. Cato		
1972	Get to Know Your Rabbit	Mr. Delasandro		
1972	Treasure Island	Long John Silver		
1972	Flames of Persia	Narrator		
1973	Kelly Country	Narrator		
1973	Who's Out There?	Narrator	Short film	
1973	Battle of Sutjeska	Winston Churchill		
1973	F for Fake	Himself		
1973	Power and Corruption	Himself	Short educational film about Macbeth	
1974	And Then There Were None	Mr. Owen	Voice	
1974	The Challenge... A Tribute to Modern Art	Himself		
1975	Bugs Bunny: Superstar	Narrator		
1975	Rikki-Tikki-Tavi	Narrator	Animated short film	
1976	F for Fake trailer	Himself		
1976	Voyage of the Damned	Raoul Estedes		
1977	The Lions of Capitalism: Some Call It Greed	Narrator		
1977	The Rime of the Ancient Mariner	Narrator		
1978	Mysterious Castles of Clay	Narrator		
1978	CPR For Citizens	Narrator	Educational film	
1978	The Greatest Battle	Narrator	English-language version	
1979	The Late Great Planet Earth	Himself		
1979	The Muppet Movie	Lew Lord		
1979	The Double McGuffin	Narrator		
1980	The Greenstone	Narrator		
1980	The Secret of Nikola Tesla	J. P. Morgan		
1980	Franklin D. Roosevelt Four Freedoms Park	Narrator		
1981	Search for the Titanic	Himself (host)		
1981	The Man Who Saw Tomorrow	Himself (host)		
1981	History of the World, Part I	Narrator		
1981	A Gift of Harvest	Narrator	Short film	
1982	Butterfly	Judge Rauch		
1982	Genocide	Narrator		
1982	Slapstick of Another Kind	Alien Father		
1984	Where Is Parsifal?	Klingsor		
1984	In Our Hands	Himself		
1984	The Last Sailors: The Final Days of Working Sail	Narrator		
1985	Almonds and Raisins	Narrator		
1986	The Enchanted Journey	Pippo	Voice, English-language version; recorded in 1985; released posthumously	
1986	Hot Money	Sheriff Paisley		
1986	The Transformers: The Movie	Unicron	Voice, recorded in 1985; released posthumously	
1987	Someone to Love	Danny's friend	Filmed in 1985; released posthumously (final film role)	

=== Television ===
Table featuring television programs which Orson Welles appeared in
Year	Title	Role	Notes	Ref.
1953	King Lear	King Lear	TV debut	
1955	Orson Welles' Sketch Book	Himself	Series	
1955	Around the World with Orson Welles	Himself	Series	
1956	Ford Star Jubilee	Oscar Jaffe	Episode: "Twentieth Century"	
1956	Out of Darkness	Narrator	Documentary	
1956	I Love Lucy	Himself	Episode: "Lucy Meets Orson Welles"	
1956	Camille, the Naked Lady and the Musketeers	Himself	Pilot	
1958	The Fountain of Youth	Host/narrator	Pilot shot in 1956, broadcast as episode of Colgate Theatre	
1958	Portrait of Gina	Himself	Pilot	
1961	Orson Welles on the Art of Bullfighting	Narrator	Documentary	
1971	The Silent Years	Host	Series	
1971	Night Gallery	Narrator	Segment: "Silent Snow, Secret Snow"	
1972	Hallmark Hall of Fame	Sheridan Whiteside	Episode: "The Man Who Came to Dinner"	
1973	Orson Welles Great Mysteries	Host	Series	
1975	Survival	Narrator	Episode: "Magnificent Monsters of the Deep"	
1976	NBC—The First Fifty Years	Host		
1978	A Woman Called Moses	Narrator	NBC Harriet Tubman biopic miniseries	
1979	Filming Othello	Himself	Documentary	
1979	The Orson Welles Show	Host	Pilot	
1979	The New Deal for Artists	Narrator		
1980	Shōgun	Narrator	Miniseries	
1981-84	Magnum, P.I.	Robin Masters (voice)	Series: 5 episodes	
1985	Scene of the Crime	Host	Series	
1985	Moonlighting	Himself	Episode: "The Dream Sequence Always Rings Twice"	

=== Uncompleted films and television programs ===
Table featuring uncompleted films and television programs which Orson Welles appeared in
Year	Title	Role	Ref.
1942	It's All True	Narrator	
1955	"The Tragedy of Lurs"	Presenter	
1955	Moby Dick—Rehearsed	Actor-Manager, Father Mapple, Captain Ahab	
1957–1972	Don Quixote	Himself, narrator, voice of Don Quixote and Sancho Panza	
1967–1970	The Deep	Russ Brewster	
1968	Vienna	Himself	
1968–1971	One Man Band	Himself, one-man band, police constable, old battle-axe, old sailor, woman selling violets and dirty postcards, Chinese manager of Ye Olde Strip Club, recorder-player, four old English lords, Count Plumfield	
1976–1985	Orson Welles' Magic Show	Himself	
1980	The Dreamers	Marcus Kleek	
1981	Filming The Trial	Himself	
1985	King Lear	King Lear	

== See also ==
- Orson Welles discography
- Orson Welles radio credits
- Orson Welles theatre credits
- Orson Welles's unrealized projects

== Bibliography ==
- Brady, Frank (2015). Citizen Welles: A Biography of Orson Welles. New York City: NY Creative Publishing. ISBN 9780989913751.
- Brooks, Tim; Marsh, Earle F. (2007). The Complete Directory to Prime Time Network and Cable TV Shows, 1946–Present. Ballantine Books. ISBN 9780345497734.
- Estrin, Mark W. (2002). Orson Welles: Interviews. University Press of Mississippi. ISBN 9781578062096.
- Graver, Gary (2008). Making Movies with Orson Welles. Scarecrow printing. ISBN 9780810882294.
- McBride, Joseph (2006). What Ever Happened to Orson Welles?: A Portrait of an Independent Career. University Press of Kentucky. ISBN 9780813124100.
- Selznick, David O. (2000). Memo from David O. Selznick. Modern Library. ISBN 9780375755316.
- Thomas, François; Berthomé, Jean-Piere (2008). Orson Welles at Work. Phaidon Press. ISBN 9780714845838.
- Welles, Orson; Bogdanovich, Peter; Rosenbaum, Jonathan (1998). This Is Orson Welles. Boston: DaCapo Press. ISBN 9780306808340.
- Wood, Brett (1990). Orson Welles: A Bio-Bibliography. Greenwood. ISBN 9780313265389.
