= Lobster Man from Mars =

- Theatrical release poster
- Directed by: Stanley Sheff
- Written by: Stanley Sheff and Bob Greenberg (idea); Bob Greenberg (screenplay)
- Produced by: Steven S. Greene; Eyan Rimmon
- Starring: Tony Curtis; Dean Jacobson; Patrick Macnee; Deborah Foreman; Anthony Hickox; S. D. Nemeth; Mindy Kennedy; Phil Proctor; Bobby Pickett; Tommy Sledge; Billy Barty
- Cinematography: Gerry Lively
- Edited by: Stanley Sheff; John Peterson
- Music by: Sasha Matson
- Distributed by: Electric Pictures
- Release date: January 29, 1989
- Running time: 82 minutes
- Country: United States
- Language: English
- Budget: $750,000

Lobster Man from Mars is a 1989 comedy film directed by Stanley Sheff and starring Tony Curtis. The film is a spoof of B movie sci-fi films from the 1950s. It had its world premiere at the Sundance Film Festival in 1989.

== Plot ==
Young filmmaker Stevie Horowitz eagerly awaits a meeting with big shot Hollywood film producer J.P. Shelldrake. Shelldrake has been desperately searching for a way to avoid problems with the IRS and unpaid millions owed them in back taxes. His brilliant yet overpaid accountant devises a scheme to allow the producer to write off the expenses of his next movie release, but only if the film is a box office flop. Armed with his foolproof plan, Shelldrake agrees to meet with Stevie and screen his film "Lobster Man from Mars" (financed by Stevie's jailed con man Uncle Joey). The plot resembles the premise of The Producers (1968) by Mel Brooks.

Inside Shelldrake's private screening room, the film within the film begins. They watch the weird plot unfold: Mars suffers from a severe air leakage. The King of Mars commands the dreaded Lobster Man and his assistant Mombo, a gorilla wearing a space helmet, to pilot his flying saucer to Earth then steal its air. Once landed, the Lobster Man wastes no time transforming hapless victims into smoking skeletons.

On a lonely road, John and Mary, a young and innocent couple discovers the hiding place of the flying saucer in a dark and mysterious cave. They attempt to warn the authorities but are ignored. Successfully contacting Professor Plocostomos, a plan is created to lure the Lobster Man to Mr. Throckmorton's Haunted House that just happens to be surrounded by boiling hot springs.

Once lured, it is simply a matter of pushing the Lobster Man into the hot water where he will be boiled to death. The plan is interrupted by Colonel Ankrum and his troops. The house is shelled and destroyed, the Lobster Man flees to his cave, taking Mary with him. She manages to escape, but the Lobster Man follows. A wild chase ensues, but Professor Plocostomos uses the hot engine coolant from his overheated vehicle to drench Mombo causing his foamy demise. The chase concludes in Yellowstone National Park where the dreaded Lobster Man is tricked into walking into the Old Faithful Geyser and a steamy demise.

The screening is over. Shelldrake cannot believe his good fortune to witness such a bad movie with potential to lose every cent invested in its distribution and promotion. He buys the production on the spot, but once in release it becomes a huge success and makes a huge profit sending Shelldrake straight to tax prison, with Stevie taking his place as the studio's new boy wonder.

== Cast ==
- Tony Curtis as J.P. Shelldrake
- Patrick Macnee as Professor Plocostomos
- Deborah Foreman as Mary
- Billy Barty as Mr. Throckmorton
- Anthony Hickox as John
- Fred Holliday as Colonel Ankrum
- Dr. Demento as The Narrator
- S. D. Nemeth as Dreaded Lobster Man
- Tommy Sledge as Himself
- M. G. Kelly as Dick Strange
- Phil Proctor as Lou
- Bobby Pickett as King of Mars / Astrologer
- Steve Peterson as The Butler
- William Ackerman as Gas Station Attendant
- Tim Haldeman as Marvin
- Jim Bentley as Rufus
- Skip Young as Mr. Zip
- Dean Jacobson as Stevie Horowitz
- Mindy Kennedy as Tammy
- Stanley Sheff as Space Bat / Brainex (voices)

== Awards and nominations ==
Sundance Film Festival

- 1989: Grand Jury Prize – (nominated)

== See also ==
- Robot Monster
