= Portrait of Gina =

1986 documentary film

Portrait of Gina, or Viva Italia is a 1958 documentary film by Orson Welles. It was funded by ABC TV. Around 30 minutes long, it follows a similar style to The Fountain of Youth (1958) and F for Fake (1973).

It was intended to be the pilot for a television series called Around the World with Orson Welles, which is also the name of a series Welles made in 1955 for British commercial television. The film is about Italy (Welles's third wife, Paola Mori was of Italian nationality) where the filmmaker lived and worked intermittently for about 20 years (roughly 1947–1969). The film discusses both negative and positive aspects of Italian culture. Actress Gina Lollobrigida, who is interviewed at the end of the film, has refused it to be allowed a public release, reportedly because she was displeased by its portrayal of her as an ambitious young actress. Vittorio De Sica, Rossano Brazzi, Anna Gruber, and Welles' wife, Paola Mori, are also briefly interviewed, and the film moves along at a rapid speed.

== History ==
When Welles submitted the film to ABC, they complained that they only received one reel of unorthodox material which they deemed unshowable, and it was never broadcast. Two years earlier, Welles had made another TV program, on Alexandre Dumas, père. It too was rejected as being unorthodox, while a further program made in 1956, The Fountain of Youth, was originally rejected on similar grounds (although it ended up getting a late-night screening in 1958, resulting in a Peabody Award).

In the late 1950s, Welles left the only copy of Viva Italia in his hotel room at the Hôtel Ritz in Paris. The film cans were unmarked, and ended up in the hotel's lost-and-found department and were eventually moved to a storage facility. The film was thought to be permanently lost until it was discovered in 1986. It was at that point that it was finally given a public showing at the Venice Film Festival, which is where Lollobrigida saw it and took legal recourse to have it banned, which she succeeded in doing. Between the Italian film festival screening and the completion of Lollobrigida's legal proceedings, the film did have one broadcast on German television (with German subtitles), and so despite the Lollobrigida ban, bootleg recordings of this broadcast continue to circulate.

== Reception ==
After it screened at the Venice Film Festival, film critic Nigel Andrews called the film "an inspired piece of editing charlatanry as a Welles growling out questions from a New York studio pretends to be interviewing Vittorio de Sica and others in sunny Italy. The piece is filmed with whirlwind wit, revolving atlases and snatches of the Harry Lime theme."

== See also ==
- List of American films of 1958
