= Dan Tobin =

American actor (1910–1982)

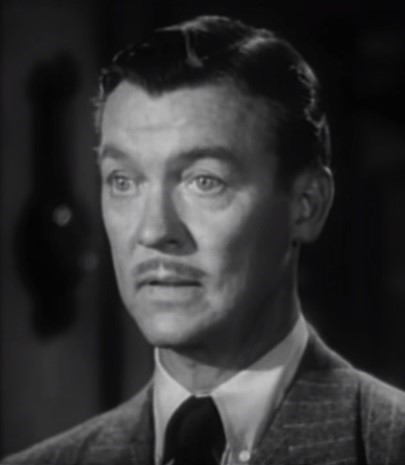
- Tobin in the TV series Four Star Playhouse (1953)
- Born: Daniel Malloy Tobin; October 19, 1910; Cincinnati, Ohio, U.S.
- Died: November 26, 1982 (aged 72); Santa Monica, California, U.S.
- Occupation: Actor
- Years active: 1939–1974
- Spouse: Jean Holloway (m. 1951)

Daniel Malloy Tobin (October 19, 1910 – November 26, 1982) was an American character actor in films, television and on the stage. He generally portrayed gentle, urbane, rather fussy, sometimes obsequious and shifty characters, sometimes with a concealed edge of malice.

== Early years ==
Tobin was a native of Cincinnati, and he attended the University of Cincinnati.

== Career ==
Tobin made his Broadway debut in American Holiday in 1936. He then joined a touring troupe in England and was seen by an impresario in a production of Ah, Wilderness! As a result, he won roles in Behind Your Back at London's Strand Theatre (1937) and Mary Goes to See at the Theatre Royal, Haymarket (1938).

Dan Tobin and Katharine Hepburn on Broadway in The Philadelphia Story (1939)

Tobin then played Alexander 'Sandy' Lord in the original 1939 Broadway production of Philip Barry's The Philadelphia Story.

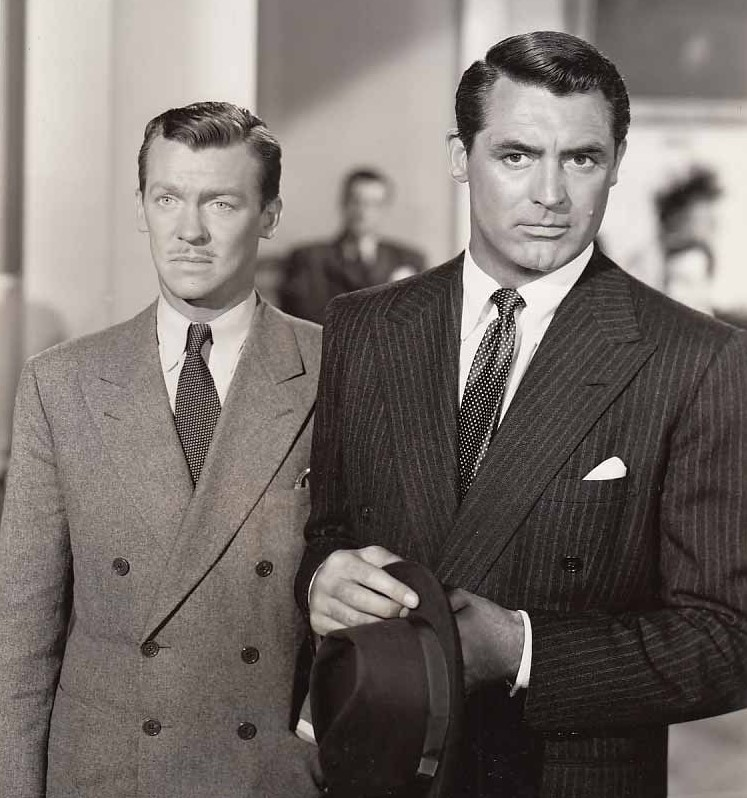
With Cary Grant in The Bachelor and the Bobby-Soxer (1947)

Tobin's most memorable roles were as the overbearing secretary, Gerald, in the 1942 film Woman of the Year and the top-billed scientist in Orson Welles's innovative, Peabody Award-winning, unsold television pilot The Fountain of Youth, filmed in 1956 and televised once two years later as an instalment of NBC's Colgate Theatre. Tobin's final film role was opposite John Huston in Welles's The Other Side of the Wind, shot in the early 1970s and released in 2018.

On television, Tobin was a regular on I Married Joan, My Favorite Husband, Mr. Adams and Eve, and Where Were You? In 1966, he became a regular during the final season of Perry Mason as the proprietor of Clay's Grill. He'd made a prior Mason appearance in 1964, as Dickens the butler in "The Case of the Scandalous Sculptor". TV Guide credits him with 44 television appearances.

== Personal life ==
Tobin was married to film and television screenwriter Jean Holloway (born Gratia Jean Casey) from 1951 to his death in 1982. They met on the set of The First Hundred Years.

== Death ==
Tobin died in Saint John's Hospital in Santa Monica, California, in November 1982, at age 72.

== Filmography ==
Year	Title	Role	Notes
1939	Black Limelight	Roberts - Reporter	
1942	Woman of the Year	Gerald Howe	
1946	Undercurrent	Professor Joseph Bangs	
1947	A Likely Story	Phil Bright	
1947	The Bachelor and the Bobby-Soxer	Chester Walters	Released as Bachelor Knight (UK)
1948	The Big Clock	Ray Cordette	
1948	Mr. Blandings Builds His Dream House	Bunny Funkhauser	Uncredited
1948	The Velvet Touch	Jeff Trent	
1948	Sealed Verdict	Lt. Parker	
1948	Miss Tatlock's Millions	Clifford Tatlock	
1949	Song of Surrender	Clyde Atherton	
1950	The Magnificent Yankee	Dixon	Uncredited
1951	Queen for a Day	Owen Cruger	
1951	The First Hundred Years	Mr. Thayer	
1953	Dream Wife	Mr. Brown	
1956	The Catered Affair	Hotel Caterer	
1956	It's Always Jan	Jack Adams	TV series, episode "Guilty Conscience"
1957	Mr. Adams and Eve	Burt Stewart	TV series, regular cast
1958	Colgate Theatre	Humphrey Baxter	TV series, episode "The Fountain of Youth"
1959	The Last Angry Man	Ben Loomer	
1961	The Andy Griffith Show	"Gentleman" Dan Caldwell	
1961	The Twilight Zone	Mr. Bagby	S2E16 "A Penny for Your Thoughts"
1962	Who's Got the Action?	Mr. Sanford	
1965-1967	Bewitched	Mr Sanders, Ed Pennybaker, Mr Ames, Mayor	S1E23 S2E28 S3E23 S3E32
1965	The Dick Van Dyke Show	Ferguson	S5 e7, "The Great Petrie Fortune,"
1965	The Munsters	Reginald Stubbs	TV series, episode "Country Club Munsters"
1963 & 1966	Gunsmoke	“Foote” & “The Professor”	TV series, episodes “Panacea Sykes” & "Champion of the World"
1967	How to Succeed in Business Without Really Trying	Johnson	
1968	Hogan's Heroes	General von Treger	
1969-1970	The Ghost and Mrs. Muir	Mr. Hampton / Dr. Ryan McNally	TV series, 2 episodes
1974	Herbie Rides Again	Lawyer	
2018	The Other Side of the Wind	Dr. Burroughs	(final film role, scenes filmed in the early 1970s)
