= Stanley Sheff =

American film director

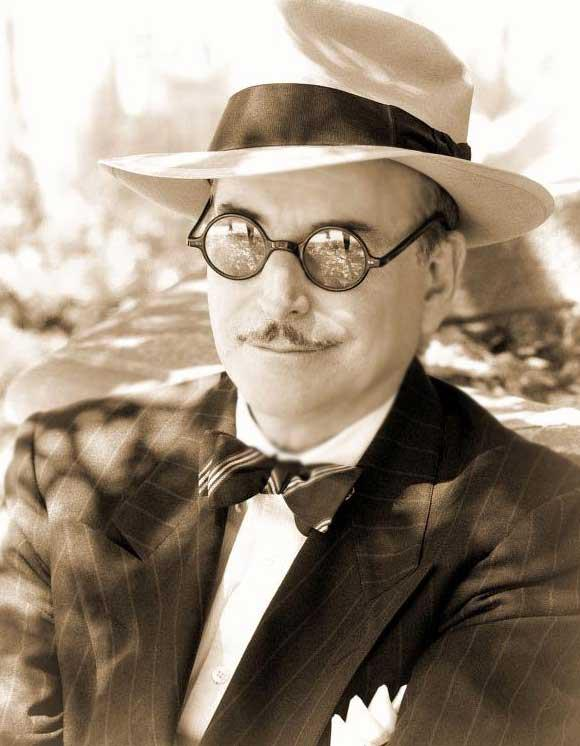
- Born: Hollywood, California, U.S. (United States)
- Occupations: Film director, Producer, Screenwriter. Actor

Stanley Sheff is an American Hollywood-born director and screenwriter. He has worked in television, stage and screen. His collaboration with Orson Welles eventually led Sheff to direct and co-write the cult sci-fi feature Lobster Man from Mars (1989) starring Tony Curtis, based on a title suggested by Welles. Feature films and television are not the only types of projects directed by Stanley Sheff. In the early 1980s, he produced, directed, and performed a popular comedy radio show for KROQ-FM radio in Los Angeles called "The Young Marquis and Stanley", a comedy show that was aired on Sunday evenings. He has appeared as Master of Ceremonies on stage and at live vintage dance events as his character Maxwell DeMille.

== Television ==
Sheff's work in television as director and editor includes the NBC-TV special "TV - The Fabulous Fifties" with featured hosts Red Skelton, Lucille Ball, Dinah Shore, Mary Martin, Michael Landon and David Janssen, the first televised outtakes show "Hollywood Outtakes" hosted by George Burns, "Amos 'n' Andy: Anatomy of a Controversy" an examination of the history of the infamous radio and television show banned in the 1960s, "Motown Returns to the Apollo" (Emmy Award winner for editing), a Chevy Chase "On Location" comedy special for HBO, and "Vincent Price: The Sinister Image", a one-hour interview with Vincent Price that aired on the A&E Channel as part of the "Biography" series. In addition, Sheff collaborated with Orson Welles as editor and uncredited co-director on The Orson Welles Show, an unsold, untelevised talk show pilot.

== Theater ==
Theatrical productions feature "The Plush Life", a comedy sitcom serial soap opera, "Queen of Outer Space: The Musical", "Dancing Cavalcade - Swing of the 1920s and 1930s", "Vaudeville Comes Home", "The Black Pirate Musical Spectacular" and "Broadway Confidential", for the Los Angeles Conservancy that was performed for a sold-out audience of over two thousand at the historic Orpheum Theater in downtown Los Angeles. Sheff also produced and directed stage shows for the Conservancy's "Last Remaining Seats" film festival that has presented film screenings with live on stage guest appearances by noted film personalities Stanley Kramer, Eva Marie Saint, Jane Wyatt, Howard Keel, Betty Garrett, Tony Curtis, Gloria Stuart, Patricia Hitchcock, Russ Tamblyn, George Takei, Jeri Ryan, Anne Francis, Billy Barty, Alan Young and many others.

== Film and Television productions directed by Stanley Sheff ==
- Return to Babylon (2013) (Producer, Writer, Editor, Actor)
- Broadway Confidential (2000)
- The Plush Life TV Show (1997)
- America Confidential (1990)
- Lobster Man from Mars (1989)
- Vincent Price: The Sinister Image (1987)
- Amos 'n' Andy: Anatomy of a Controversy (1986)
- Hollywood Outtakes (1983)
- The Orson Welles Show (1979) (Editor, Actor, Co-Director)
- Sinister Flesh (1976)

== Stage Shows directed by Stanley Sheff ==
- The Lullaby of Broadway - A Tribute to Harry Warren and Al Dubin (2014)
- The Wizard of Oz - 1939 Costume Parade (2012)
- A Salute to our Armed Forces at the Million Dollar Theatre (2009)
- Broadway Rhythm - All Singing! All Dancing! (2005)
- The Hollywood Fashion Parade (2002)
- Waltzing at the Wiltern (2001)
- Broadway Confidential (2000)
- The Time Machine 40th Anniversary Celebration with Jeri Ryan (2000)
- The Broadway Follies (2000)
- Jazz Babies On Broadway (1999)
- Dancing Extravaganza featuring Leonard Reed (1999)
- Forbidden Planet Cast Reunion with George Takei (1999)
- Dancing Cavalcade (1998)
- Queen of Outer Space: The Musical (1998)
- Vaudeville Comes Home featuring Billy Barty (1997)
- The Black Pirate Musical Spectacular (1996)

== Awards and nominations ==
Sundance Film Festival

- 1989: Grand Jury Prize – Lobster Man from Mars (nominated)
