= Orson Welles' Magic Show =

- Written by: Orson Welles
- Directed by: Orson Welles
- Starring: Orson Welles; Angie Dickinson; Gary Graver; Roger Hill
- Country of origin: United States
- Original language: English

Production
- Producers: Orson Welles; Stefan Drössler (reconstruction supervisor)
- Cinematography: Gary Graver; Tim Suhrstedt
- Running time: 27 minutes

Orson Welles' Magic Show is an unfinished television special by Orson Welles, filmed between 1976 and 1985. In it, Welles performs various magic tricks for the camera, promising that no trick photography is used.

Welles had a lifelong interest in magic, having been taught his first magic tricks by Harry Houdini in the 1920s, when Welles was still a boy. He had already demonstrated his magic tricks in a number of films and television programmes including Follow the Boys (1944), Magic Trick (1953), Casino Royale (1967), and on his own unsuccessful 1979 pilot for The Orson Welles Show.

After Orson Welles' death in 1985, all of his unfinished films were bequeathed to his long-term companion and mistress Oja Kodar, and she in turn donated many of them (including Orson Welles' Magic Show) to the Munich Film Museum for preservation and restoration. In 2000, the Munich Film Museum then edited together the complete footage into a 27-minute cut, which has subsequently been screened at numerous film festivals.

The restored footage has never been released on video or DVD.
