= The Challenge... A Tribute to Modern Art =

1974 film

- Directed by: Herbert Kline
- Written by: Herbert Kline
- Produced by: Herbert Kline
- Narrated by: Orson Welles
- Distributed by: Cinemation Industries
- Release date: December 5, 1974
- Running time: 104 minutes
- Country: United States
- Language: English

The Challenge... A Tribute to Modern Art is a 1974 American documentary film directed by Herbert Kline. It was nominated for an Academy Award for Best Documentary Feature.

== See also ==
- List of American films of 1974
- Orson Welles filmography
