= Magic Trick (film) =

1953 film by Orson Welles

- Directed by: Orson Welles
- Written by: Orson Welles
- Starring: Orson Welles
- Release date: 1953
- Running time: 3 minutes
- Country: United States
- Language: English

Magic Trick is a short film made in 1953 by Orson Welles, for use in a show by magician Richard Himber. It involves Welles on-screen interacting with Himber off-screen as the two play a card trick, and would have been projected life-size (in black and white) during Himber's touring stage show in the 1950s.

It was the first time Welles had filmed any magic tricks since his segment in the 1944 film Follow the Boys (which in turn used tricks Welles originally staged in the 1943 The Mercury Wonder Show); and from the late 1960s onwards, Welles would perform more of these tricks in public, most notably in The Orson Welles Show (1979) and Orson Welles' Magic Show (1976-1985).

== Subsequent use of the footage by David Copperfield ==
Magician David Copperfield resurrected the footage for use in his 1992 CBS TV special, The Magic of David Copperfield XIV: Flying - Live the Dream. In it, he interacted with the footage to repeat the same card trick, claiming that he was communicating with Orson Welles from beyond the grave.

To further this, all the instances in which Welles referred to Richard Himber off-screen as "Dick" were dubbed into "Dave".
