= Billy House =

American actor (1889–1961)

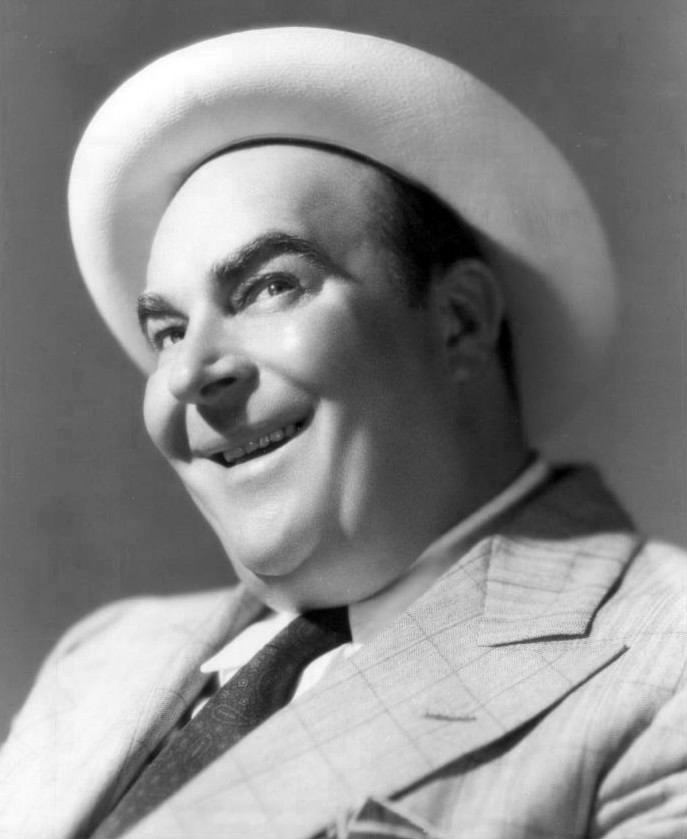
- House in 1937
- Born: William H. Comstock; May 7, 1889; Mankato, Minnesota, U.S.
- Died: September 23, 1961 (aged 72); Woodland Hills, California, U.S.
- Other names: William House (early films); William H. House (copyright records)
- Occupations: Actor, comedian
- Years active: c. 1905–1959

William H. Comstock (May 7, 1889 – September 23, 1961), known by his stage name Billy House, was an American actor, vaudevillian and Broadway performer. After devoting most of his career to live performance, he moved to Hollywood where he became a supporting actor during the 1940s and 1950s. According to admirer Orson Welles, the name "Billy House" was likely an invention for use in burlesque theaters.

== Career overview ==
Breaking into show business as a trumpet player, House worked in circuses, vaudeville, burlesque theaters and radio dramas before adding the occasional Broadway turn and bit part in feature films to his résumé. One of his Broadway co-stars, Pauline Moore, once recalled an incident about his performance in the 1933 Earl Carroll version of Murder at the Vanities:

He had a heart attack one night, and every minute he wasn't on the stage he was sitting there, the sweat just running off of him. But the minute his time came for an entrance — on he went!

— Pauline Moore

House was also used as a live-action model for the Disney characters of Doc (in Snow White and the Seven Dwarfs) and Smee (in Peter Pan).

By the mid-1940s he had begun working more steadily in film. The bulk of his larger film roles came between 1945 and 1952. House appeared on television at least once late in his career.

== Theatrical legacy ==
Because much of House's earliest theatrical work took place in smaller off-Broadway venues and burlesque stages, much of it escaped the notice of theatrical critics. Consequently, it is difficult to assess the nature or quality of his work until the late 1920s, when he began appearing on Broadway. It is known that his estate memorabilia, which would have included many of his vaudeville routines, did pass into the hands of noted variety theater enthusiast and historian, Milt Larsen. This material was originally housed at the Society for the Preservation of Variety Arts in the Friday Morning Club building in the 1970s and 1980s, but was subsequently moved to the basement of the Magic Castle in about 1991.

House began performing on Broadway in the late 1920s, and generally caught the eye of national critics. Many reviews prominently mentioned his size as much as his performance. Time magazine said of House's presence in Luckee Girl (1928), "Billy House moved about the stage like a grinning Guava jelly, singing 'Whoopee' with suave insinuations." The New York Times was less focused on House's size, and more interested in his performance, which they said gave "considerable liveliness" to the venture. Five years later, Time said of Murder at the Vanities (1933) that House was "as incredibly fat behind as before", while noting that he contributed to the play's "bewildering" conclusion when his character requested "a steak so big you can milk it". By 1936, Time had essentially reduced House's contribution to White Horse Inn to theatrical trope, saying only that House was "a comic with a big belly". Still, the New York press was considerably kinder to White Horse Inn than Time. The New York Times said it was possessed of "lavish showmanship"; the New York Herald-Tribune said it was "a beautiful colorful and sufficiently lively show"; while the New York American raved, "Here, believe me, is a very magnum of delights." Because White Horse Inn was embraced by the New York press, Billy House received what one scholar of the play called "a big career boost".

== Film legacy ==
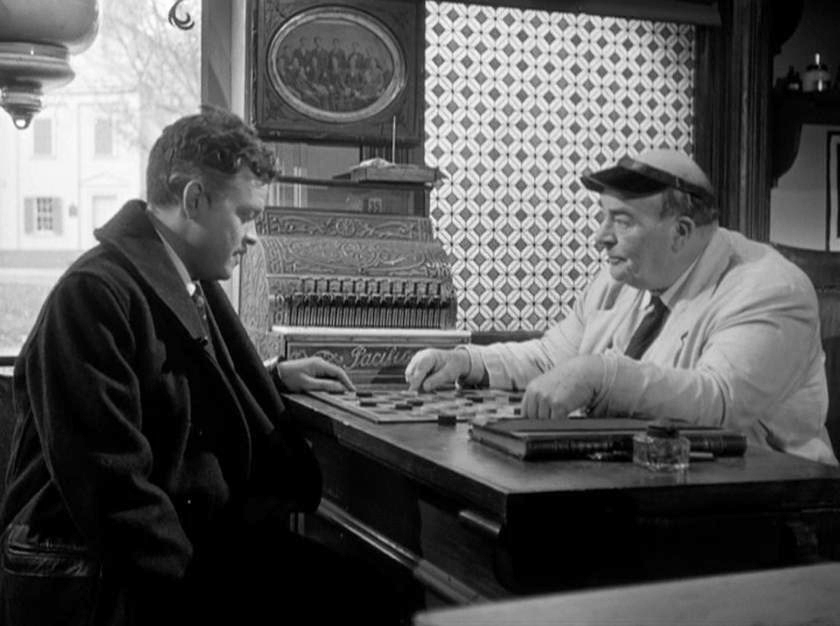
House (right) and Orson Welles in The Stranger (1946)

House began his film career as the star of two-reelers in about 1930. His most frequent collaborator in these short films was the prolific two-reel director Aubrey Scotto. Together they made The Dunker, Retire Inn, Bullmania and Out of Bounds. All of these were also written by House, and at least some were adaptations of theatrical routines he had previously copyrighted. Between 1930 and 1931, he made at least four more two-reelers, and his first feature film, Smart Money. Money would see him work for the first time alongside Edward G. Robinson and Boris Karloff, both of whom would figure prominently in his later films.

After the short subject format fell out of fashion, House evolved into a character actor in feature-length films. House's significant girth made him a natural for the memorable role of Friar Tuck, opposite Alan Hale's Little John in the 1950 film, Rogues of Sherwood Forest. He is also remembered by scholars of horror films for his "superb" performance as the obese, ambiguously evil Lord Mortimer in Boris Karloff's Bedlam (1946). Later, he had significant role in the first Ma and Pa Kettle film, The Egg and I (1947) and appeared in Inner Sanctum (1948) and Naked Gun (1956).

House was a particular favorite of actor/director Orson Welles, who employed him on three occasions: The Stranger (1946), The Fountain of Youth (1956) and Touch of Evil (1958). Indeed, Welles had long watched House's burlesque career before initially casting him in The Stranger. While working with him on that first film, Welles came to know House as a "very funny man" possessed of "great old-fashioned slang that I've treasured through the years". His character — a comic druggist who played checkers — was not initially a major part of the film, but Welles became so enamored of House's talents, that the character's importance grew with last-minute script additions on the set. These revisions came at the expense of Edward G. Robinson's character, causing the more famous actor to complain ineffectually to studio executives. In the end, The Stranger was, according to Welles, "House's picture".

== Filmography ==
Film
Year	Title	Role	Notes
1931	God's Gift to Women	Mons. Cesare	
1931	Smart Money	Irontown Salesman	
1931	The Reckless Hour	Seymour Jennison	
1931	Expensive Women	George Allison	
1935	A Tale of Two Cities	Border Guard	Uncredited
1937	Merry-Go-Round of 1938	Billy	
1937	Snow White and the Seven Dwarfs	Doc	Performance model
1945	Thrill of a Romance	Dr. Tovve	
1946	Bedlam	Lord Mortimer	
1946	The Stranger	Solomon Potter	
1947	Trail Street	Carmody	
1947	The Egg and I	Billy Reed	
1947	Joe Palooka in the Knockout	Sam Wheeler	
1947	The Wistful Widow of Wagon Gap	Shotgun Rider	Voice, Uncredited
1948	Inner Sanctum	McFee	
1950	Rogues of Sherwood Forest	Friar Tuck	
1950	Where Danger Lives	Mr. Bogardus	
1951	Santa Fe	Luke Plummer	
1951	People Will Talk	Coonan	Uncredited
1951	Silver City	Tim Malone - Saloon Owner	Uncredited
1952	Aladdin and His Lamp	Kafan	
1952	Outlaw Women	Uncle Barney	
1956	Naked Gun	Judge Cole	
1958	Touch of Evil	Construction Site Foreman	Uncredited
1958	Colgate Theatre	Albert Morgan	TV series, episode "The Fountain of Youth"
1959	Imitation of Life	Fat Man on Beach	(final film role)
