= Rick Jason =

American actor (1923–2000)

- Born: Richard Jacobson; May 21, 1923; New York City, U.S.
- Died: October 16, 2000 (aged 77); Moorpark, California, U.S.
- Resting place: Hollywood Forever Cemetery
- Education: American Academy of Dramatic Arts
- Years active: 1950–1989
- Spouses: Aria Allen (m. 1950; div. 1962) Shirley Johnston (m. 1962; div. 1962) Jutta Parr (m. 1962; div. 1964) Pat Nelson (m. 1968; div. 1970) Cindy Jason (m. 1983)
- Military career
- Allegiance: United States
- Branch: U.S. Army Air Forces
- Service years: 1943–1945
- Rank: Private
- Conflicts: World War II

Rick Jason (born Richard Jacobson; May 21, 1923 – October 16, 2000) was an American actor. He is most remembered for starring in the ABC television drama Combat! (1962–1967).

== Early life and education ==
Jason was born Richard Jacobson in Brooklyn, New York to a Jewish family. As a child, he was a good student who proved to be popular with his classmates and teachers. He graduated from Rhodes Preparatory School in Manhattan.

== Military service ==
Rick Jason served from 1943 to 1945 in the U.S. Army Air Corps during World War II. In the late 1960s and early 1970s, he visited American troops serving in Vietnam on several USO tours.

== Acting career ==
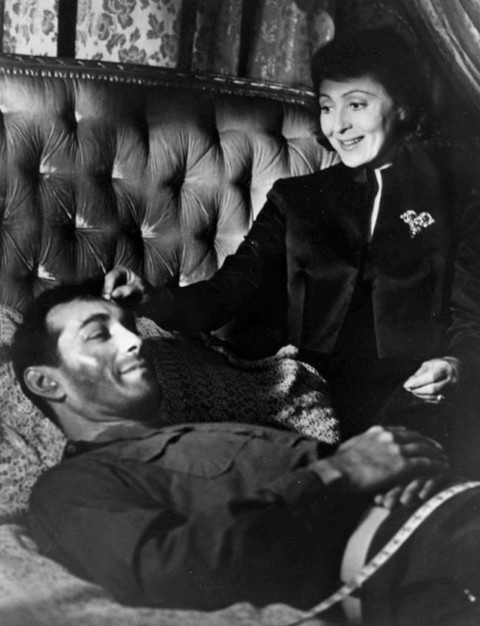
Rick Jason and Luise Rainer in Combat! (1965)

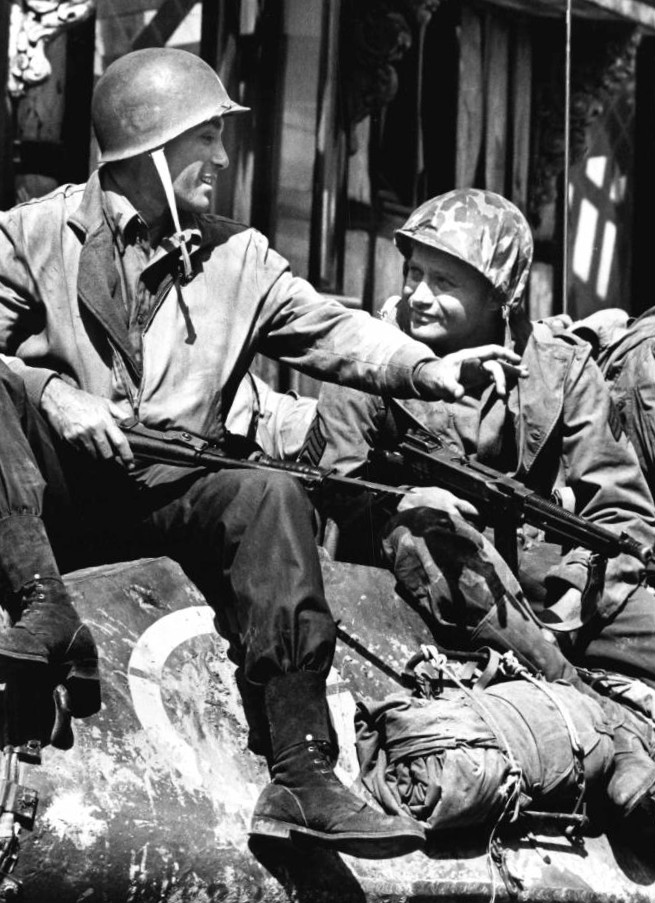
Rick Jason and Vic Morrow in Combat! (1962)

Later, MGM was searching for an actor to replace Fernando Lamas in the 1953 movie Sombrero and gave the role to Jason, who was earlier released from Columbia Pictures. This led to Jason being cast in The Saracen Blade (1954) and This Is My Love (1954).

Although not top-billed, Jason occupied most of the screen time as the amorous driver in John Steinbeck's The Wayward Bus, which included several "torrid scenes" that pushed the bounds of the waning Production Code.

In 1956, Jason played the lead in The Fountain of Youth, a half-hour unsold television pilot written and directed by Orson Welles which won the Peabody Award in 1958. The pilot aired as an episode of the anthology series Colgate Theatre on September 16, 1958.

Soon after, Jason received offers for television series. He guest-starred on ABC's anthology series, The Pepsi-Cola Playhouse. In 1954, he played Joaquin Murietta, the notorious Mexican bandit of the California Gold Rush, in an episode of Jim Davis's syndicated western series Stories of the Century, the story of a railroad detective investigating crime in the American West. He appeared on the NBC interview program Here's Hollywood, in the Rawhide episodes "Incident of the Coyote Weed" and "Incident of the Valley in Shadow", and co-starred in 1969 in The Monk.

In 1960, he starred as insurance investigator Robin Scott in The Case of the Dangerous Robin, a syndicated American television series that lasted only one season. It was not renewed due to Jason's health issues, including back problems. In 1962, he began starring in the television series Combat! as Platoon Leader 2nd Lt. Gil Hanley, probably his most memorable role. In this series he shared the starring role in an alternating episode rotation, with Vic Morrow as Sgt. Chip Saunders, though in many episodes they both appeared. The show was a hit that lasted for 152 episodes in five seasons.

After Combat!, Rick returned to stage acting. He made films in Japan and Israel, as well as films such as Color Me Dead (1969), The Day of the Wolves (1971), The Witch Who Came from the Sea (1976), Love and the Midnight Auto Supply (1977), Partners (1982) and Illegally Yours (1988). He also played Cornelius Vanderbilt in the 1989 miniseries Around the World in 80 Days. In 1973, he was a frequent character on The Young and the Restless. He was also a favorite voice for TV commercial narration in the 1960s.

== Retirement ==
After retiring from screen appearances, Jason kept busy by doing voice-overs for commercials and wrote his autobiography, Scrapbooks of My Mind. In 2000, he attended a Combat! reunion in Las Vegas with fellow cast members.

== Personal life ==
In his personal life, Jason enjoyed playing guitar, painting, sculpting, collecting wines, flying, hunting, photography, and breeding tropical fish.

In 2000, Jason published his autobiography Scrapbooks of My Mind: A Hollywood Autobiography. The book describes Jason growing up in New York during the Great Depression and shares behind-the-scenes stories of his film and tv career. The book was pulled from publication after his death in October 2000. A version of the book exists online.

== Death ==
Jason died from a self-inflicted gunshot wound one week after the Combat! reunion, on October 16, 2000, in Moorpark, California, where he lived. He left no note. Authorities said the actor was "despondent" over "unspecified personal matters."

His body was cremated and interred at the Hollywood Forever Cemetery in Hollywood, Los Angeles, California in the Cathedral Mausoleum.

== Legacy ==
Concerning Combat!, pop culture scholar Gene Santoro has written:

TV's longest-running World War II drama (1962–1967) was really a collection of complex 50-minute movies. Salted with battle sequences, they follow a squad's travails from D-Day on – a gritty ground-eye view of men trying to salvage their humanity and survive. Melodrama, comedy, and satire come into play as top-billed Lieutenant Hanley (Rick Jason) and Sergeant Saunders (Vic Morrow) lead their men toward Paris ...

Producer Steve Rubin wrote a tribute to Jason published in the Los Angeles Times on October 20, 2000:

The baby boomer generation lost one of its heroes on Monday — Rick Jason is gone. He was better known as Lieutenant Hanley on the long-running 1960’s World War II series, "Combat!" As they often say in Hollywood war films, we lost us a good man. Jason was not only a wonderful human being, a devoted husband, and a fine actor, he was one of our best storytellers with links to the "Golden Age" of Hollywood.

Rubin concluded:

For we boomers, Rick Jason helped illuminate the legacy of World War II to those of us too young to experience or remember it. He brought dignity to the image of the fighting man at a time when Vietnam was moving us in the other direction. Over those five years of episodes, he brought home every week the sense of fear, sacrifice and the great love soldiers have for each other. Jason and the squad were our touchstones to the dynamic era of the 1940s when America won the war.

== Filmography ==
Year	Title	Role	Notes
1953	Sombrero	Ruben	
1954	The Saracen Blade	Enzio Siniscola	
1954	This Is My Love	Glenn Harris	
1956	The Lieutenant Wore Skirts	Captain Barney Sloan	
1957	The Wayward Bus	Johnny Chicoy	
1958	Rx Murder	Jethro Jones	
1958	Sierra Baron	Miguel Delmonte	
1958	Colgate Theatre	Alan Brody	Season 1 Episode 5: "The Fountain of Youth"
1959	Alfred Hitchcock Presents	Arthur	Season 4 Episode 25: "The Kind Waitress"
1959	Rawhide	Manso	Season 2 Episode 9: "Incident of the Valley in Shadow"
1968	Teppô denraiki or The Saga of Tanegashima	Captain Pinto	
1969	Color Me Dead	Bradley Taylor	
1970	Ha-Pritza Hagdola	Beno	Also known as Eagles Strike at Dawn
1971	The Day of the Wolves	No. 4	
1971	The Virginian (TV series)	Tom Fuller	Season 9 Episode 24: "Jump-Up"
1974	A Time for Love		
1976	The Witch Who Came from the Sea	Billy Batt	
1977	Love and the Midnight Auto Supply	Councilman Ted Fredricks	
1977	Proof of the Man	Lionel Adams	
1978	Wonder Woman	Uncle Lawson Koslo	Season 2 Episode 19: "Seance of Terror"
1982	Partners	Douglas	
1983	Shôsetsu Yoshida gakko	General Douglas MacArthur	
1988	Illegally Yours	Freddie Boneflecker	
