= Sombrero (film) =

1953 film

- Directed by: Norman Foster
- Written by: Josefina Niggli; Norman Foster
- Based on: A Mexican Village; 1945 novel by Josefina Niggli
- Produced by: Jack Cummings
- Starring: Ricardo Montalbán; Pier Angeli; Vittorio Gassman; Yvonne De Carlo
- Cinematography: Ray June
- Edited by: Cotton Warburton
- Music by: Leo Arnaud; Geronimo Villavino
- Color process: Technicolor
- Distributed by: Metro-Goldwyn-Mayer
- Release date: April 22, 1953
- Running time: 103 minutes
- Country: United States
- Language: English
- Budget: $1,821,000
- Box office: $2,460,000

Sombrero is a 1953 American musical romance film directed by Norman Foster and starring Ricardo Montalbán, Pier Angeli, Vittorio Gassman, Cyd Charisse, and Yvonne De Carlo. The film is based on the 1945 book Mexican Village by Josefina Niggli, a collection of 11 short stories set in the north Mexican town of Hidalgo. In his long review for the October 16, 1945 issue of The New York Times, Orville Prescott calls it "remarkable...one of the finest books about Mexico I have ever read.”

== Plot ==
Three couples involved in budding romances are caught in the middle of a feud between two Mexican villages.

== Cast ==
- Ricardo Montalbán as Pepe Gonzales
- Pier Angeli as Eufemia Calderón
- Vittorio Gassman as Alejandro Castillo
- Yvonne De Carlo as María of the River Road
- Cyd Charisse as Lola de Torrano
- Rick Jason as Ruben
- Nina Foch as Elena Cantú
- Kurt Kasznar as Padre Zacaya
- Walter Hampden as Don Carlos Castillo
- Thomas Gomez as Don Homero Calderón
- José Greco as Gitanillo de Torrano
- John Abbott as Don Daniel
- Andrés Soler as Little Doctor
- Fanny Schiller as Doña Fela
- Luz Alba as Rosaura
- Rosaura Revueltas as Tia Magdalena
- Alfonso Bedoya as Don Inocente
- Beatriz Ramos as Señora Inocente
- Florencio Castelló

== Production ==
In June 1951, MGM announced they had bought the screen rights to Mexican Village as a "possible vehicle for Ricardo Montalbán" and assigned Jack Cummings to produce. In July, Norman Foster was signed to direct and co-write the script with Niggli. The original cast was Montalbán, Cyd Charisse and Fernando Lamas, plus one American – Joseph Cotten, Wendell Corey and John Hodiak were the favorites for this. (Both Cummings and Foster had made movies in Mexico.) Eventually the American character was removed. Niggli and Foster collaborated on the script over six months.

In April 1952, Cornel Wilde was being sought for a lead role. By this stage the title of the film had changed from Mexican Village to Sombrero. Vittorio Gassman, Pier Angeli and Ava Gardner joined the cast; it was Gassman's second American film after The Glass Wall. Gardner dropped out in late April and was put on suspension by MGM (lifted when she agreed to make Mogambo).

Then Lamas refused to make the film because it meant going on location in Mexico; MGM suspended him until he agreed to star in The Girl Who Had Everything. By May, Yvonne De Carlo, Nina Foch and Kurt Kaznar joined the cast. Rick Jason joined the cast (presumably replacing Lamas), making his film debut. Dore Schary said he expected Gassmann and Jason to become big stars.

Filming started June 1952. The movie was shot on location in Mexico City, Cuernavaca, Tetecala and Tepoztln, Mexico.

De Carlo did all her scenes with Gassman. "We got along wonderfully," she said. "He's a wonderful actor."

TCM's Frank Miller observes: “The film features a few musical numbers, most notably Greco's energetic flamenco in the first U.S. film to capture his artistry. There's also a beautifully performed but decidedly strange number for Charisse, who dances out her psychological conflicts under Hermes Pan's direction (some sources credit Stanley Donen) on a studio-built mountaintop.”

== Reception ==
In his April 23, 1953 review for The New York Times, Bosley Crowther writes: “ Sombrero …is a big, broad-brimmed, squashy sort of picture, as massive as the garment for which it is named…Although it is labored under by a distinguished and resolute cast, it engulfs and obliterates its people in a huge, mottled, shape-obscuring shade. The reason for this is easily obvious. It was made to cover a lot of area, and the people who put it together didn't have the large-scale skill for the job.” According to Crowther, the “lively folk tales” are (re-told) so poorly…that the sum is a jumbled, tedious blob…. But this must be said for "Sombrero"—it is beautifully photographed in very fine Technicolor and the actual countryside of Mexico, in which it is set, is lovely. There, at least, it is not in the shade.”

According to MGM records, the film earned $1,071,000 in the U.S. and Canada, and $1,389,000 in other markets, resulting in a profit of $592,000.

== Proposed sequel ==
In September 1952, before the film was released, MGM announced Foster would write a follow-up movie based on three or four other stories in the collection Mexican Village that were not used in Sombrero, but no film was made.
