= The Stranger (1946 film) =

1946 film by Orson Welles

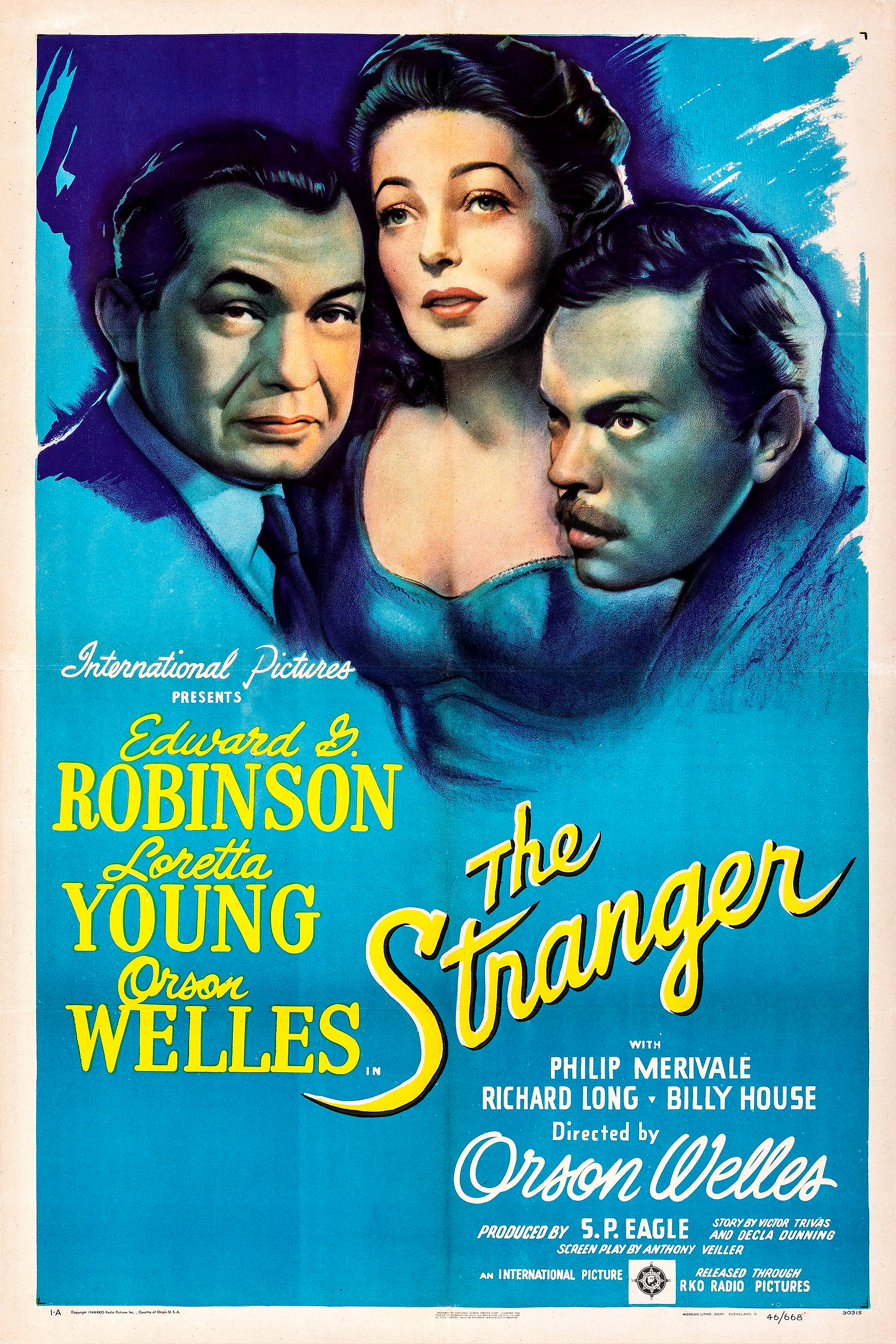
- Theatrical release poster
- Directed by: Orson Welles
- Written by: Anthony Veiller; John Huston (uncredited); Orson Welles (uncredited)
- Story by: Victor Trivas; Decla Dunning; Philip MacDonald (uncredited)
- Produced by: S. P. Eagle
- Starring: Orson Welles; Loretta Young; Edward G. Robinson; Philip Merivale; Richard Long; Billy House
- Cinematography: Russell Metty
- Edited by: Ernest J. Nims
- Music by: Bronisław Kaper
- Production company: International Pictures
- Distributed by: RKO Radio Pictures
- Release dates: July 2, 1946 (Los Angeles, Salt Lake City)
- Running time: 95 minutes
- Country: United States
- Language: English
- Budget: $1.034 million
- Box office: $3.22 million 931,868 admissions (France)

The Stranger is a 1946 American thriller film noir directed and (although uncredited) co-written by Orson Welles, starring himself along with Edward G. Robinson and Loretta Young. Welles's third completed feature film as director and his first film noir, it centers on war crimes investigator Wilson tracking high-ranking Nazi fugitive Franz Kindler to a Connecticut town. It was the first Hollywood film to incorporate actual documentary footage of the Holocaust.

The film was met with positive reviews from critics and was nominated for the Golden Lion (then-called the ‘Grand International Prize’) at the 8th Venice International Film Festival. Screenwriter Victor Trivas received a nomination for the Academy Award for Best Story. The film entered the public domain when its copyright was not renewed.

== Plot ==
The Stranger

Mr. Wilson, an agent of the United Nations War Crimes Commission, is hunting for Franz Kindler, a Nazi fugitive and war criminal. Having erased all evidence that might identify him, Kindler is only known to the UNWCC for his nearly maniacal passion for clocks.

Wilson releases Kindler's former associate Konrad Meinike, hoping the man will lead him to Kindler. He follows Meinike to the small town of Harper, Connecticut, but Meinike knocks him out cold before meeting Kindler. Kindler has assumed a new identity as "Charles Rankin", a teacher at a local prep school. He is about to marry Mary Longstreet, daughter of Supreme Court Justice Adam Longstreet, and is involved in repairing a 400-year-old Habrecht-style clock mechanism with religious automata that crowns the belfry of a church in the town square. Repentant and having become a Christian, Meinike begs Kindler to confess his own crimes. Fearing he might be exposed, Kindler strangles Meinike and buries him in the woods.

Recovering from his injury, Wilson begins investigating newcomers to Harper. He visits the Longstreet house, where Rankin declares that Germany must be eliminated so as not to pose a threat to the world. When Wilson counters that there are many good and positive Germans and cites the example of Karl Marx, Rankin states that as Marx was a Jew, he could not be a German, exposing himself as Kindler. Even so, not having witnessed the meeting with Meinike, Wilson still requires proof, and only Mary knows about the meeting. To secure her admission, Wilson attempts to convince her that her husband is a criminal before Kindler decides to eliminate the threat by killing her. Kindler's facade begins to unravel when Red, the family dog, discovers Meinike's body. To further protect his secret, Kindler poisons Red.

Meanwhile, Mary grows suspicious of her husband. Kindler admits to killing Meinike and Red, but claims Meinike was in town to blackmail her and her father. Wilson shows Mary graphic footage of Nazi concentration camps and explains how Kindler developed the idea of genocide. Mary, seeking to protect Kindler, lies about Meinike but remains torn between her love and her desire for the truth. Kindler tries to arrange a fatal "accident" for Mary, but she discovers the plot. Finally accepting that Rankin is Kindler, she dares her husband to kill her to his face. Kindler's attempt is prevented by the arrival of Wilson and Mary's brother, and he escapes from the house.

Kindler flees into the church belfry, followed by Mary and then Wilson. Meanwhile the residents of Harper, hearing the repaired clock bell, arrive outside the building. At the top of the tower, Kindler pulls a gun and a struggle ensues. Mary ends up with the gun and shoots Kindler. He staggers outside to the belfry's clock face, is impaled by the sword of one of the moving clock figures, and falls to his death.

== Cast ==
- Orson Welles as Franz Kindler, alias Professor Charles Rankin
- Edward G. Robinson as Mr. Wilson
- Loretta Young as Mary Longstreet Rankin
- Philip Merivale as Judge Adam Longstreet
- Richard Long as Noah Longstreet
- Konstantin Shayne as Konrad Meinike
- Byron Keith as Dr. Jeffrey Lawrence
- Billy House as Mr. Potter
- Martha Wentworth as Sara
- Isabel O'Madigan as Mrs. Lawrence
- Pietro Sosso as Mr. Peabody
- Erskine Sanford as Party Guest
- Theodore Gottlieb as Farbright (not in released version)
- David Bond as Student

Contemporary news items about the production add uncredited and unconfirmed cast members Neal Dodd, Nancy Evans, Fred Godoy, Joseph Granby, Ruth Lee, Lillian Molieri, Gabriel Peralta, Gerald Pierce, Robert Raison, Rebel Randall, Johnny Sands, and Josephine Victor.

== Production ==
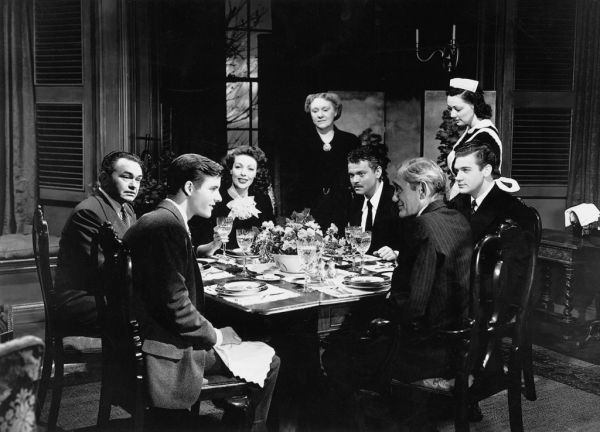
Left to right: Edward G. Robinson, Richard Long, Loretta Young, Martha Wentworth, Orson Welles, Philip Merivale, Byron Keith, and an unidentified actress in The Stranger (1946)

Produced by Sam Spiegel (who then billed himself as S. P. Eagle), The Stranger was the last International Pictures production distributed by RKO Pictures. Filming took place from late September to November 21, 1945, at Samuel Goldwyn Studios and Universal Studios. The film's musical score is by Bronisław Kaper.

Spiegel initially planned to hire John Huston to direct The Stranger. When Huston entered the military, Orson Welles was given the chance to direct the film and prove himself able to make a film on schedule and under budget—something he was so eager to do that he accepted a disadvantageous contract. In September 1945, Welles and his wife Rita Hayworth signed a guarantee that Welles would owe International Pictures any of his earnings, from any source, above $50,000 a year if he did not meet his contractual obligations. He also agreed to defer to the studio in any creative dispute. The Stranger was Welles's first job as a film director in four years.

Editor Ernest J. Nims was given the power to cut any material he considered extraneous from the script before shooting began. "He was the great supercutter," Welles said, "who believed that nothing should be in a movie that did not advance the story. And since most of the good stuff in my movies doesn't advance the story at all, you can imagine what a nemesis he was to me."

For directing and acting in The Stranger, Welles was to receive $2,000 a week plus $50,000 when the film was completed, and a chance to sign a four-picture deal with International Pictures, making films of his own choosing.

Welles was given some degree of creative control. He worked on the general rewrite of the script, wrote all of the scenes in the drugstore, and wrote scenes at the beginning of the picture that were shot but subsequently cut by Spiegel and executive producer William Goetz. Welles had endeavored to personalize the film and develop a nightmarish tone. There is uncertainty about how much of this material was actually shot and how much was removed. Some scenes elaborated on Konrad Meinike (Konstantin Shayne)'s flight through Latin America, shadowed by an agent named Marvales and his wife, a woman in distinctive gold earrings who is murdered by savage dogs kept by the Nazis-in-exile. A brief vestige of the sequence remains in the final release version. In a 1982 interview, Nims said 32 pages of the script were eliminated at his suggestion, including the first 16 pages.

An early scene showing a meeting of Mary Longstreet Rankin (Loretta Young) and Charles Rankin (Welles) was filmed but removed. She finds him in the woods, looking at the incongruous 16th-century Gothic clock in the town square, and tells him it was "brought by sailing ship from the shores of the Mediterranean" by one of her ancestors. Rankin is familiar with the clock and her family's history, and as they walk through the cemetery he notes the many Longstreets who are buried there and their patriotic service.

"Character development suffers from the loss of these scenes," wrote film historian Bret Wood, who also observes that inclusion of the Latin American pursuit would have increased the sense of foreboding before the story enters the idyllic town of Harper. A sense of mystery would also have been set up by an imaginative but unrealized pre-title sequence in the Welles version; instead, the titles are simply superimposed over the image of the clock.

Welles wanted Agnes Moorehead to portray the investigator Wilson. "I thought it would be much more interesting to have a spinster lady on the heels of this Nazi," Welles said. Edward G. Robinson was cast instead.

Welles planned to use the campus of his alma mater, the Todd School for Boys in Woodstock, Illinois, as the setting for The Stranger. The idea was ruled out by budget restrictions, but a few artifacts are seen in the film. A sign in the gymnasium reads "Harper vs. Todd" and refers to Clover Hall, a building on the Todd campus, and "Mrs. Collins"—Annetta Collins, teacher, housemother, and director of kitchen services. It was Collins who had recruited Welles for Todd in 1926, after meeting the boy at his father Richard's hotel in Grand Detour. A note on a blackboard, in Welles's handwriting, refers to Wallingford Hall, another building at Todd. A notice on the wall is signed "Coach Roskie"—Anthony C. Roskie, Todd's longtime athletic director.

Perry Ferguson, production designer for Citizen Kane, was borrowed from Samuel Goldwyn Productions. For Welles, Ferguson created a complete town square, an interlocking series of sets in related proximity to each other. Scenes could be filmed that provided deep views of adjacent buildings through windows or reflected in their glass, adding richness and dimension.

"When we're filming inside the drug store, we get a sense of depth that is extremely rare in a Hollywood movie," said film historian Bret Wood:

In the shot where Wilson plays checkers with Potter, you can look behind Potter and see a mirror behind him, and through the mirror see Potter and Wilson again, and then see the window behind the camera, and see through that window to cars, buildings and natural sunlight. It's truly radical. If it were deep focus the way Gregg Toland had shot Citizen Kane, maybe it would have been noticed or written about in the last 70-odd years.

The set facilitated long takes in which conversations begin indoors, move outside to actual storefronts, and continue across the town square. Welles used long takes as a way to protect the integrity of his film, giving "the great supercutter" nothing to cut away to. The long takes are so subtle that they go unnoticed. At a time when a one-minute take was a rarity, Welles presents one unbroken scene between Kindler and Meinike in the woods that is four minutes long—longer than the bravura opening of Touch of Evil (1958).

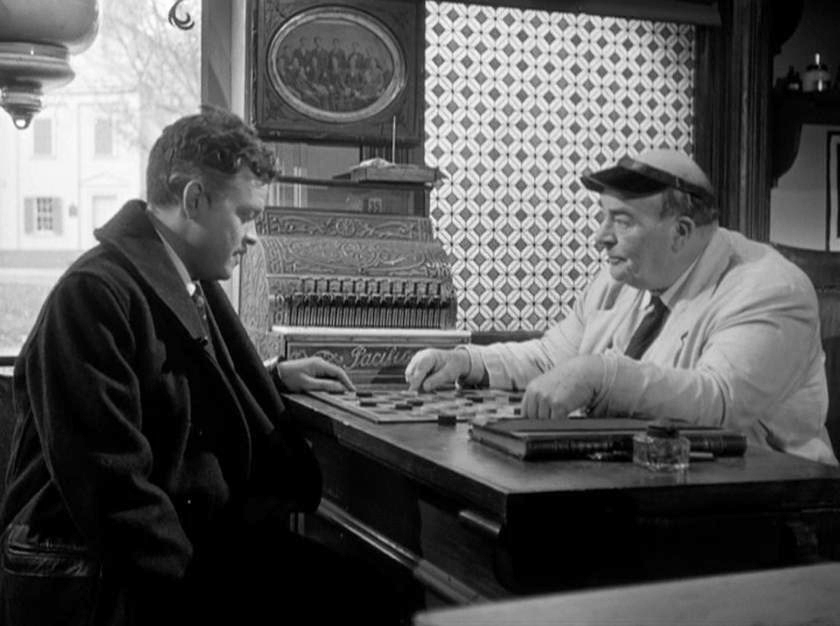
Welles and Billy House in The Stranger

The character of Potter—a comic druggist who plays checkers—was played by actor Billy House, a burlesque star who became a particular favorite of Welles. The character was not initially a major part of the film, but Welles expanded the role as filming progressed. Feeling that these revisions came at his expense, Edward G. Robinson complained ineffectually to studio executives.

Welles recalled Loretta Young's support in a dispute with Spiegel, when the producer ordered a closeup of Young during a medium-full shot of Mary's fight with Kindler. "It would have been fatal," Welles said. "I told that to Loretta, and she said, 'Well then, we're not going to make it.'" When Spiegel continued to insist on the closeup, Young brought in her agent. "Imagine getting a star's agent in to ensure that she wouldn't get a closeup!" Welles said. "She was wonderful."

"No one who worked on the film can remember any special anecdotes or problems concerning it," wrote biographer Frank Brady. "Welles has said, since the making of The Stranger—which he completed one day before schedule and under budget—that nothing in the film was his, this despite the fact that the unmistakable Wellesian moods, shadows, acute angles, and depth-of-focus shots are pervasive. Within the film is a second film, another Wellesian touch, consisting of snatches of documentary footage showing Nazi atrocities." The Stranger was the first commercial film to use documentary footage from the Nazi concentration camps.

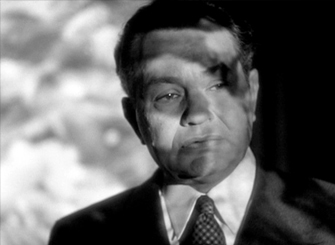
Wilson (Edward G. Robinson) steps into the projected image of the Holocaust footage in The Stranger

"What we tend to forget today is that in the 1940s a large percentage of the population could not believe that the Nazi death camps were real," said Bret Wood. Welles had seen the footage in early May 1945 in San Francisco, as a correspondent and discussion moderator at the United Nations Conference on International Organization. Welles wrote of the Holocaust footage in his syndicated column for the New York Post (May 7, 1945).

No, you must not miss the newsreels. They make a point this week no man can miss: The war has strewn the world with corpses, none of them very nice to look at. The thought of death is never pretty but the newsreels testify to the fact of quite another sort of death, quite another level of decay. This is a putrefaction of the soul, a perfect spiritual garbage. For some years now we have been calling it Fascism. The stench is unendurable.

"It is clear that the visual power of the newsreels had struck him deeply, and it is no surprise that clips from them would be included only a few months later in The Stranger," wrote film scholar Jennifer L. Barker.

Three of the four post-liberation scenes included in The Stranger are from Nazi Concentration Camps (1945), a film assembled by George Stevens, James B. Donovan and Ray Kellogg and used as evidence in the Nuremberg Trials.

Within weeks of the completion of The Stranger, International Pictures backed out of its promised four-picture deal with Welles. No reason was given, but the impression was left that The Stranger would not make money.

== Release ==
=== Box office ===
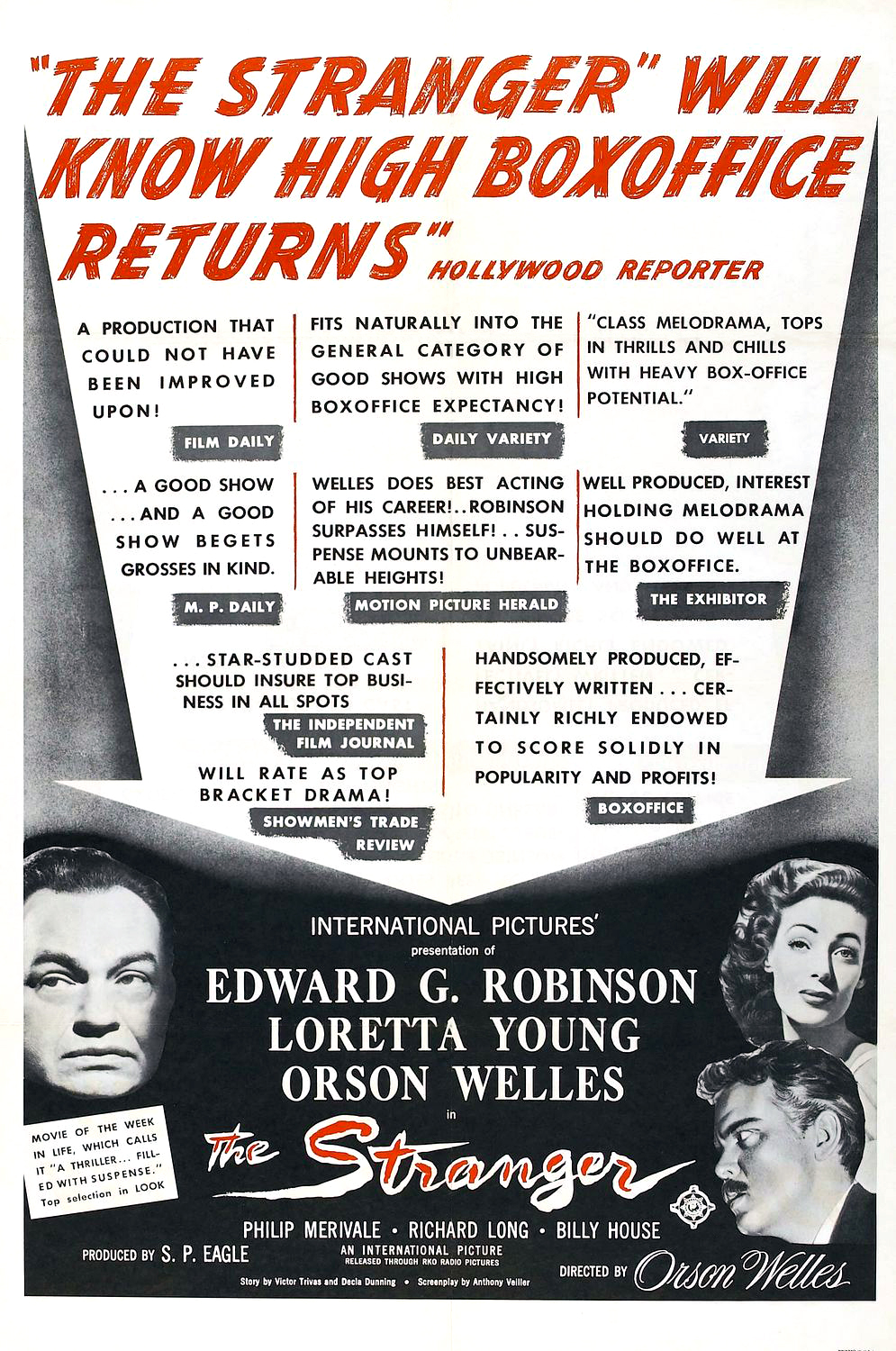
Contemporary response featured on a poster for The Stranger

The Stranger was the only film made by Welles to have been a bona fide box office success upon its release. Its cost was $1.034 million; it earned $2.25 million in U.S. rentals in its first six months, and 15 months after its release it had grossed $3.216 million.

=== Critical reception ===
"The Stranger exists as an answer to the critics who complained that Welles could not make a 'program' picture," wrote film noir scholar Carl Macek. "He did, and it has found a niche in the canon of the film noir."

The Stranger holds a 97% rating at Rotten Tomatoes based on 29 critic reviews, including two contemporaneous reviews. The sole negative review is that of The New York Times critic Bosley Crowther, published in July 1946. Crowther called the film a "bloodless, manufactured show" in which Welles "gave no illusion of the sort of depraved and heartless creatures that the Nazi mass-murderers were. He is just Mr. Welles, a young actor, doing a boyishly bad acting job in a role which is highly incredible—another weak feature of the film. As a matter of fact, the writing of The Stranger, by Anthony Veiller, is the weakest thing about it—and that estimation includes another silly performance by Loretta Young as the killer's wife. For the premise is not only farfetched, but the whole construction of the tale relieves very soon all the mystery and suspense that such a story should have."

More favorable coverage was found in Variety, which called the film "a socko melodrama, spinning an intriguing web of thrills and chills. Director Orson Welles gives the production a fast, suspenseful development, drawing every advantage from the hard-hitting script from the Victor Trivas story. … A uniformly excellent cast gives reality to events that transpire. The three stars, Robinson, Young and Welles, turn in some of their best work, the actress being particularly effective as the misled bride." Life magazine featured The Stranger as Movie of the Week in its issue dated June 3, 1946. The film was screened in competition at the 1947 Venice Film Festival. Critic James Agee wrote in The Nation in 1946: "Orson Welles's new movie, The Stranger, is a tidy, engaging thriller about a Nazi arch-criminal ... There is nothing about the picture that even appears to be "important" or "new", but there is nothing pretentious or arty either, and although I have occasionally seen atmospheres used in films in far grander poetic context, I don't think I have seen them more pleasantly or expertly appreciated. In a quite modest way the picture is, merely, much more graceful, intelligent, and enjoyable that most other movies ... " Leslie Halliwell wrote: "Highly unconvincing and artificial melodrama enhanced by directorial touches, splendid photography and no-holds-barred climax involving a church clock."

On its release, The Stranger was unfavorably compared to Alfred Hitchcock's Shadow of a Doubt (1943). "One reason for the similarities is the recutting, supervised by Ernest Nims," wrote film historian Bret Wood. "By removing the Latin American sequence and many of the political elements (such as the clock/fascist analogy),The Stranger is transformed from a socially relevant drama to a small town murder story, with the villain more a psychopath than a political fugitive. Nims cut the film to play like a conventional thriller with little regard to Welles's subtextual purposes."

In his audio commentary for the 2013 Blu-ray release of The Stranger, Wood calls it "an undervalued film" due to the absence of the "stylistic swagger" of Citizen Kane and The Magnificent Ambersons. He regards Welles's third completed film as "deceptive and much more complex stylistically and thematically" than has so far been appreciated.

=== Awards ===
At the 19th Academy Awards, Victor Trivas received a nomination for the Academy Award for Best Story. The award went to Clemence Dane for Vacation from Marriage.

=== Home media ===
After the film fell into the public domain, a number of poor-quality versions of The Stranger were released by various sources. Some versions were duplicated from second- or third-generation releases, and were severely and badly edited, until MGM Home Entertainment (the owners of most of the International Pictures catalog) restored the film and released it on DVD in 2004.

An archival restoration was released on DVD and Blu-ray Disc by Kino Classics in October 2013. Kino's release was mastered from a 35mm print at the Library of Congress. The release includes audio commentary by Bret Wood. The DVD includes excerpts of Death Mills (1945), a U.S. War Department documentary on the Nazi death camps directed by Billy Wilder. Other extras include four of Welles's World War II radio broadcasts: "Alameda" (Nazi Eyes on Canada, 1942), "War Workers" (Ceiling Unlimited, 1942), "Brazil" (Hello Americans, 1942), and "Bikini Atomic Test" (Orson Welles Commentaries, 1946). The disc is not captioned for the hearing impaired.

Olive Films also put out a Blu-Ray of the film sanctioned from MGM in 2017. The film is also available on the Netflix and Amazon Prime streaming services, and the Dailymotion and YouTube video-sharing platforms.

== Adaptations ==
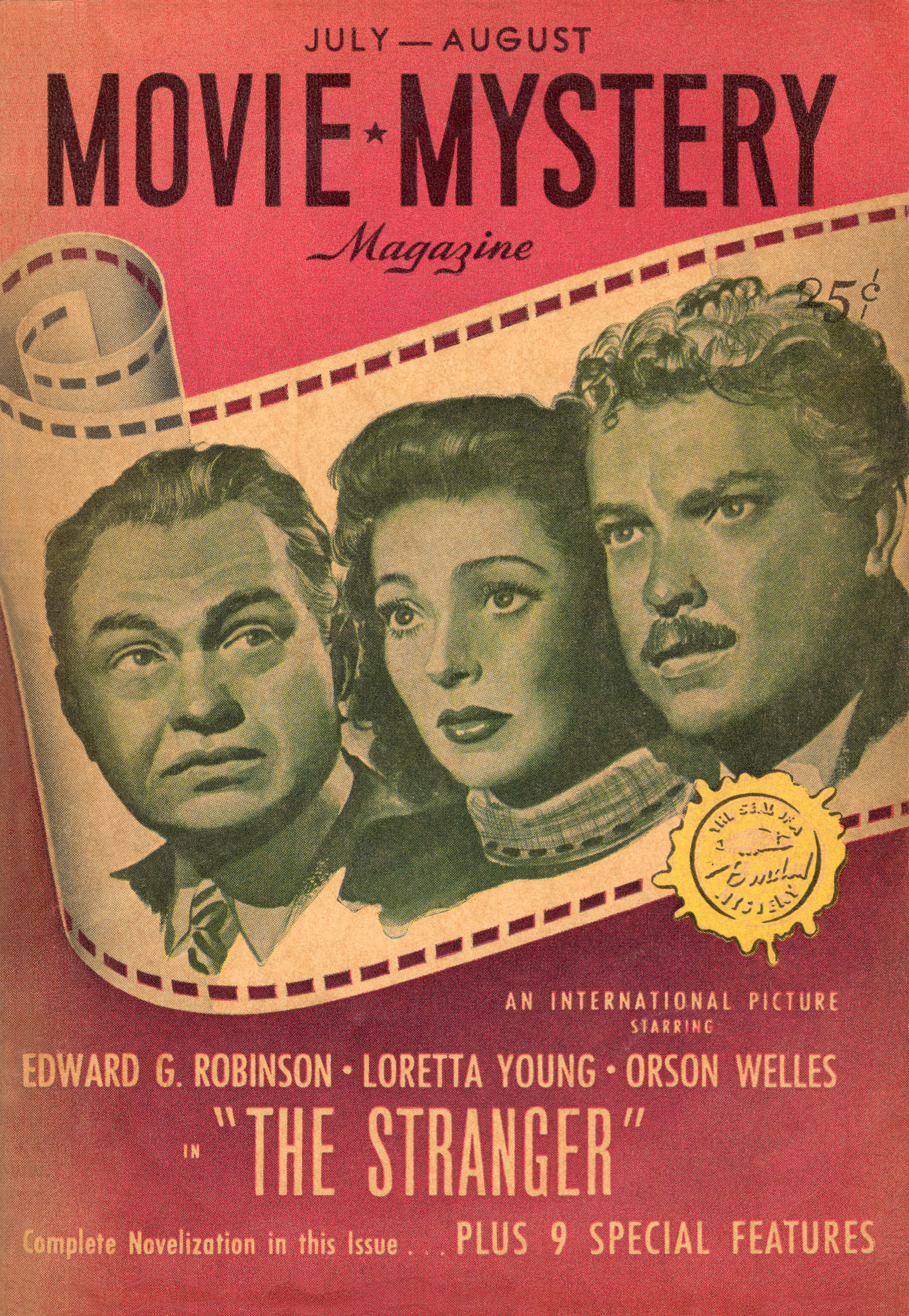
The premiere issue of Movie Mystery Magazine (July–August 1946) featured a novelization of The Stranger

The debut issue (July–August 1946) of the short-lived pulp digest Movie Mystery Magazine presented a novelized condensation of the screenplay for The Stranger.

A half-hour adaptation of The Stranger aired on CBS Radio's This Is Hollywood on December 7, 1946. Robinson re-created his role from the film, performing with Ruth Hussey, Roland Morris, and Gerald Mohr.

== Copyright ==
The copyright on the film originally belonged to The Haig Corporation, but the film is in the public domain because the producers did not renew the copyright in 1973.

== See also ==
- Public domain film
- List of Holocaust films
- List of United Artists films
