= An Evening with Orson Welles =

- Directed by: Orson Welles
- Written by: Orson Welles
- Starring: Orson Welles
- Cinematography: Gary Graver
- Distributed by: Sears and Roebuck
- Release date: 1970
- Running time: Six films 30 minutes each
- Country: United States
- Language: English

An Evening with Orson Welles is a series of six short films created in 1970 by Orson Welles, for the exclusive use of Sears, Roebuck & Co. Welles produced the recitations of popular stories for Sears's Avco Cartrivision machines, a pioneering home video system. Four of the films are regarded as lost; as of 2022, two of the films, The Golden Honeymoon and Two Wise Old Men: Socrates and Noah, are known to exist.

== Production ==
In 1970, after he had begun filming The Other Side of the Wind, Orson Welles was contacted by Sears and hired to make a series of half-hour short films that would be available for rental by subscription. Welles wrote, directed and acted in six 30-minute recitations including Ring Lardner's The Golden Honeymoon, Oscar Wilde's The Happy Prince, writings by G. K. Chesterton and P. G. Wodehouse, and speeches by Socrates and Clarence Darrow. The films were available exclusively through Sears, on special tapes that could be used only with the retailer's high-end Cartrivision — cartridge television — home video machines.

Cinematographer Gary Graver photographed the half-hour videos beginning August 31, 1970, shortly after he met Welles.

"We shot them in a little studio inside Orson's house on Lawlen Way," Graver wrote in his posthumously published memoir, Making Movies with Orson Welles (2008):

Shooting the shorts for Sears was a simple job. We finished them and sent them off. But we never received any feedback and we never heard anything about them again. Now, in hindsight, I wish I'd saved copies of those, since they seem to have completely disappeared from the face of the earth! Only one of those shorts, Ring Lardner's The Golden Honeymoon, is known to exist today. I would love to see those again.

Titles that appeared on Cartrivision cassettes included American Heritage, Vol. 1, American Heritage, Vol. II: Clarence Darrow, Noah and Socrates, and My Little Boy. Welles recorded his six half-hour readings for Avco on 31 August 1970. However, it was not until June 1972 that the Cartrivision system went on release, and poor sales meant that the line was discontinued after only thirteen months, in July 1973.

== Preservation status ==
Two of the six recordings are known to have survived.

- The Golden Honeymoon by Ring Lardner has been held since the 1990s by the Munich Film Museum. Its incomplete copy was restored for the 2005 Locarno Film Festival, and still occasionally screens at international film festivals. The surviving footage was supplemented by audio from Welles's reading in his 1946 Mercury Theatre radio play, plugging the gaps in the recording to complete the story.
- In 2022, the Estate of Orson Welles announced that it had acquired and digitised another of the Welles tapes—Two Wise Old Men: Socrates and Noah—and hopes to make the short film available to the public. The Estate reported that it was one of two surviving Cartivision tapes that had been located; but the other, American Heritage, Vol. II: Clarence Darrow, turned out to have been professionally wiped. It is believed that a number of tapes were mass-wiped over copyright concerns at the time of the Cartrivision company's dissolution in 1973. The Estate, working with Reeder Brand Management, revealed in March 2023 they were looking for a streamer or label interested in releasing the film, along with other Welles television projects.
- In 2024, missing episodes hunter Ray Langstone spotted Orson Welles American Heritage Volume 1 Cartrivision film being sold on eBay. This was brought to the attention of Wellesnet, and later announced this on the Missing Episodes Forum and on social media.

== See also ==
- List of American films of 1970
