= Steve Peterson (actor) =

American actor

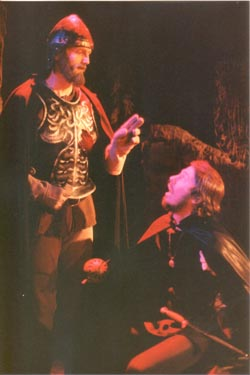
- Occupation: Actor
- Years active: 1986–2008

Steve Peterson is an American actor who was seen as Stanley in The Body at the Matrix Theatre, King Arthur in Dennis Gersten’s The Author’s Thumb, Tranio in Taming of the Shrew at the Globe Playhouse, Aguecheek in Twelfth Night for both Shakespeare at Play and Ellen Geer's Theatricum Botanicum, and as the Ghost in Mark Ringer’s production of Hamlet.

== Background ==
He has appeared at the Write/Act Repertory Theatre Company in Murder, Mayhem and the Macabre, A Patriot for Me, Transports of the Heart, and Bleak House. Other Los Angeles stage appearances include A Month in the Country at the Odyssey Theatre, The Letter Writer at the Santa Monica Playhouse, and Agatha Christie’s Black Coffee at the Sierra Madre Playhouse. Peterson has appeared in numerous productions at San Diego’s Old Globe Theatre, at the Grove Shakespeare and Nevada Shakespeare Festivals, and the UK/AZ Festival in Phoenix, as well as Glendale’s A Noise Within. Peterson’s Television credits include appearances on the daytime serials Days of Our Lives and General Hospital as well as primetime series Murphy Brown, Murder, She Wrote, and Mama’s Family, to name a few. Peterson can be seen in the cult film classic Lobster Man from Mars, and as one of the many Elvi in Honeymoon in Vegas.
