= Colgate Theatre (1958 TV series) =

American anthology television series

- An August 19, 1958, advertisement for the premiere episode of Colgate Theatre.
- Genre: Anthology series
- Presented by: Bill Goodwin
- Country of origin: United States
- Original language: English
- No. of seasons: 1
- No. of episodes: 8

Production
- Running time: 30 minutes

Original release
- Network: NBC
- Release: August 19 – October 7, 1958

Colgate Theatre is a 30-minute dramatic anthology television series broadcast on NBC during the summer and early autumn of 1958. It consisted entirely of unsold television pilots.

Colgate Theatre was unrelated to NBC's live television anthology series of the same name of 1949–1950.

== Background ==
The practice of television executives of ordering dozens of pilots for proposed television series each year – far more than their networks could possibly broadcast as series – created a sizable body of unsold pilots that had never aired. Packaging these unsold pilots in anthology series and airing them during the summer provided television networks with a way of both providing fresh programming during the summer rerun season and recouping at least some of the expense of producing them.

Colgate Theatre was one such series. Using the same name as an earlier anthology series of live dramas NBC had broadcast in 1949–1950, it was a last-minute replacement during the 1950s quiz show scandals for the quiz show Dotto, which ended on August 12, 1958, amid accusations that it was rigged. Colgate Theatre served as a filler for the sponsor of Dotto, Colgate-Palmolive, until The George Burns Show premiered on October 14, 1958.

Bill Goodwin was the host of Colgate Theatre. Stars appearing in the series included Walter Brennan, Claudette Colbert, Joanne Dru, Vera Miles, Ricardo Montalbán, and Jane Russell.

== Critical reception ==
The fifth episode of Colgate Theatre, "The Fountain of Youth," won a Peabody Award in 1958 for Orson Welles, who wrote, directed, narrated, arranged the music for, and designed the sets for it. On September 16, 1958, the Chicago Tribune wrote, "Orson Welles hasn't lost his touch. This is as witty and imaginative a TV film as we've ever seen. Welles has written the screen play, designed the sets, arranged the music, directed the show, and narrated the action, and he comes out ahead on all fronts. Based on a short story by the macabre humorist, John Collier, the film tells of the hilariously harrowing triangular relationship of a vengeful scientist, a lush actress, and a tennis playing playboy. The performances of Dan Tobin, Joi Lansing and Rick Jason as the leads, plus those of everybody else, are superb. But perhaps the outstanding feature of the production is that, for once, every aspect of TV filming has been used for maximum effect. Unlike most films for TV, this one indicates taste, care, intelligence and a sense of humor."

Of the sixth episode, "McCreedy's Woman," which starred Jane Russell, the Chicago Tribune wrote, "All it proves is that Miss Russell would be a welcome addition to the TV roster, if somebody could find the right format for her. In this play, she appears as the owner of a small night club, wears some attractive clothes, sings a few songs, and struggles thru an extremely obvious teleplay."

== Broadcast history ==
Colgate Theatre ran for eight episodes on eight consecutive weeks in the summer and early autumn of 1958 on Tuesday evenings from 9:30 to 10:00 p.m. Eastern Time. It premiered on August 19, and its last episode aired on October 7.

== Episodes ==
No.	Title	Directed by	Written by	Original release date
1	"Adventures of a Model"	Norman Tokar	Sidney Sheldon	August 19, 1958
A fashion model who uses her wits to hold off wolfish suitors and dislikes athletics must endure an agonizing series of athletic challenges to please a Texas sportswear manufacturer. Starring Joanne Dru, Roxanne Arlen, Phil Arnold, Jimmy Cross, John Emery, Bob Jellison, William Kendis, Nancy Kulp, William Redfield, Charles Wagenheim, and Roland Winters.
2	"The Last Marshal"	Harve Foster	Hugh King	August 26, 1958
A United States marshal travels to Wyoming to clean up illegal activities involving both outlaws and lawmen. Starring James Craig, Marshall Thompson, Robert Wilke, Judith Ames, Trevor Bardette, Kem Dibbs, Earle Hodgins, Richard Keith, and Dale Van Sickel.
3	"Tonight in Havana"	Fletcher Markle	David Ahlers & Burnham Carter	September 2, 1958
A restaurant owner and his wife lead a carefree life in Havana, Cuba, until an old romantic partner of the owner arrives and begs him to help her recover a stolen necklace. Starring Ricardo Montalban, Mari Aldon, Edward Colmans, Raul De Castellanos, James Gavin, Rogelio Hernández, Gustave Meler, Lita Milan, Maria Munne, and Luis Oquendo.
4	"Strange Counsel"	Jerry Thorpe	Ellis Marcus, Harold Swanton, and Arthur Chesney Train	September 9, 1958
A very astute lawyer with a folksy demeanor works for a young woman who believes that someone has tampered with her grandfather's will and that her uncle is the culprit. Starring Walter Brennan, Vera Miles, Whit Bissell, Olive Blakeney, Geraldine Carr, Douglas Evans, Barbra Fuller, Harry Harvey, Jr., Don Shelton, and George Weiss. The unsold pilot for the proposed series Mr. Tutt.
5	"The Fountain of Youth"	Orson Welles & John Collier	Orson Welles	September 16, 1958
A newly married woman receives as a wedding gift from her vengeful scientist ex-boyfriend a vial containing a potion that can provide a person with 200 years of youthful vigor and good looks — but there is only enough potion in the vial for one person, leading to conflict as she ponders whether to take the potion herself or give it to her new husband. Starring Dan Tobin, Joi Lansing, Rick Jason, Billy House, Nancy Culp, and Madge Blake. Narrated by Orson Welles.
6	"McCreedy's Woman"	Allen H. Miner	Richard Carr & Gloria Saunders	September 23, 1958
Also spelled "Macreedy's Woman" and "MacGready's Woman." The owner of a small nightclub tries to turn a gambler into an honest man, but romance and the interference of other people complicate her efforts. Starring Jane Russell, Don Durant, Bill Erwin, Ned Glass, Jonathan Harris, and Sean McClory.
7	"Welcome to Washington"	Norman Tokar	Inez Asher & Whitfield Cook	September 30, 1958
After a newly elected congresswoman arrives in Washington, D.C., she discovers that there is a lot more to representing her legislative district than merely passing legislation — including, as one of her first challenges, house-hunting with her husband. Starring Claudette Colbert, Elvia Allman, Florenz Ames, Eric Anderson, Herb Butterfield, Malcolm Cassell, Herb Ellis, Leif Erickson, Shelley Fabares, Tony Henning, Doris Packer, Maudie Prickett, and Paula Winslowe. An unsold pilot for a proposed series, The Claudette Colbert Show.
8	"If You Knew Tomorrow"	Thomas Carr	Palmer Thompson	October 7, 1958
When a teletype machine begins to report the news before it happens, a newscaster sets out to avert a disaster, trying to find a woman who will be in a catastrophic accident when her car collides with a train the following day. Starring Bruce Gordon, Judith Ames, Dan Barton, Frances Bavier, Harry Cheshire, Harry Harvey, Jr., Dick Ryan, and Herb Vigran.
