= The Fountain of Youth (film) =

1958 film

- Orson Welles presenting The Fountain of Youth
- Directed by: Orson Welles
- Screenplay by: Orson Welles
- Based on: Youth from Vienna by John Collier
- Produced by: Desi Arnaz
- Starring: Dan Tobin; Rick Jason; Joi Lansing
- Narrated by: Orson Welles
- Cinematography: Sidney Hickox
- Edited by: Bud Molin
- Production companies: Orson Welles Enterprises, Inc. Desilu Productions
- Release date: September 16, 1958
- Running time: 25 minutes
- Country: United States
- Language: English
- Budget: $54,896 total cost

The Fountain of Youth is a 1956 television pilot directed by Orson Welles for a proposed Desilu Productions anthology series that was never produced. Based on a short story by John Collier, the short film narrated onscreen by Welles stars Dan Tobin, Joi Lansing and Rick Jason. The Fountain of Youth was televised once, on September 16, 1958, on NBC's Colgate Theatre. It received the prestigious Peabody Award for 1958, the only unsold television pilot ever to be so honored.

== Production ==
The Fountain of Youth is a 1956 television pilot for an anthology series that was never produced. It was broadcast once, on September 16, 1958, on NBC's Colgate Theatre. The short film was written and directed by Orson Welles, based on the short story "Youth from Vienna" by John Collier. Joi Lansing and Rick Jason star as a narcissistic couple faced with an irresistible temptation concocted by a scientist (Dan Tobin). Welles himself is also much in evidence as onscreen narrator.

"It was intended to inaugurate a series of short stories Welles would narrate and direct in the First Person Singular style of his Mercury Theatre on the Air and Campbell Playhouse radio series, but with his innovative radio techniques adapted for the visual intimacy of the newer medium," wrote Welles biographer Joseph McBride. "Welles described it to me as his only 'film conceived for the box'. The vaudeville-show tone and blackout style, suited to the 1920s setting, lend unsettling dark humor to this fable about human vanity … As the faintly sinister host, Welles is so ubiquitous a presence, sometimes even mouthing the characters words, that he becomes their puppet master, darkly amused by their self-destructive foibles."

Desi Arnaz conceived the series and proposed that Welles host and narrate every episode — combining his gift for storytelling with the intimacy of television. "When I made my deal with Orson for the pilot, I was trying to develop an anthology series which would include The Fountain of Youth," Arnaz wrote, "and the kind of stories Edgar Allan Poe is famous for, like 'The Pit and the Pendulum'." Working with Desilu art director Claudio Guzmán, Welles used an innovative process of stills and live action, Arnaz recalled:

We used still pictures and "hold frames," and a lot of the stuff they think is so new today. If we wanted to show a guy making a successful play for a girl, we would use four still pictures: he looking, she looking, he winking, she winking, hold frame. It was almost a comic-strip technique and hadn't been used on television.

"I was very fond of it, that way of doing it," Welles recalled. "It was based entirely on back projection, there was no scenery. We just took the props from the prop department and put them behind the screen, and a few little things in front. It was entirely ad lib. … And of course it's the only comedy I've ever made on film. I used to do an awful lot of comedy in the theatre, and radio. But in film I've always been pretty solemn."

Most published reports that the pilot was costly and over schedule were refuted by Welles scholar Bill Krohn, who studied the Desilu files. Filming took five days, May 8–11 and 14, 1956. The total cost was $54,896 — nearly $5,000 over budget but about half the cost of the first episode of I Love Lucy. Before signing the deal Arnaz had clarified the finances with Welles: "I am not RKO. This is my 'Babalu' money," Arnaz told him. "I never had any trouble with Orson," Arnaz wrote.

Arnaz reported that CBS gave the series a slot, with General Foods as a sponsor, but the challenges in getting Welles to commit to a series lasting 30 to 38 weeks daunted them and the series did not go on the air.

Leading man Rick Jason devoted a chapter called "Orson Welles and Feet of Clay" in his online autobiography, Scrapbooks of My Mind, to the making of the film, carefully detailing the unique approaches Welles employed to arrive at the film's striking result. In a May 2000 discussion at the Paley Center for Media Jason described his difficulties in working with Welles.

The Fountain of Youth remains available for viewing at the Paley Center for Media in New York City and Los Angeles. Welles' youngest daughter, Beatrice, working with Reeder Brand Management revealed in March 2023 they were looking for a streamer or label interested in releasing the film, along with other Welles television projects.

== Cast ==
In order of onscreen credits:

- Dan Tobin as Humphrey Baxter
- Joi Lansing as Carolyn Coates
- Rick Jason as Alan Brody
- Nancy Kulp as Stella Morgan
- Billy House as Albert Morgan
- Madge Blake as Letty Pauther (uncredited)
- Orson Welles as Host / narrator

== Accolades ==
=== Awards ===
The Fountain of Youth was broadcast September 16, 1958, on NBC-TV's Colgate Theatre. It received a special 1958 Peabody Award, announced in April 1959 by Peabody board chairman Bennett Cerf:

To Orson Welles, for the wit, originality, and insouciance of The Fountain of Youth, NBC, one of the merriest, most irreverent half-hours of the year 1958, this special Peabody Award is given.

"It was the only unsold pilot ever to win the then most coveted award in television," wrote executive producer Desi Arnaz.

=== Subsequent recognition ===
"Hollywood at this time was just getting into film production for TV", said Ron Simon, curator of the Museum of Television & Radio in Beverly Hills, California, where the film screened in 2000. "Welles obviously had a much greater vision. It would have been interesting if he could have tried to do this on a weekly basis."

"The best measure of how far ahead of its time this experimental but unpretentious program was in 1958 is that it still seems avant-garde compared with anything yet seen on American commercial television," wrote biographer Joseph McBride in 2006.

== See also ==
- List of American films of 1958
