= Orson Welles and People =

- Written by: Orson Welles
- Directed by: Orson Welles
- Narrated by: Orson Welles
- Theme music composer: Orson Welles (arranger)
- Country of origin: United States
- Original language: English
- No. of episodes: 1 pilot

Production
- Producer: Orson Welles
- Running time: 27 min
- Production company: Orson Welles Enterprises
- Budget: $5,000

Orson Welles and People was a 1956 pilot for a projected documentary series by Orson Welles, which is now believed to be lost.

The pilot was a portrait of Alexandre Dumas, entitled "Camille, the Naked Lady and the Musketeers". It was filmed in just one day in October 1956, at a Poverty Row studio in Hollywood using the $5,000 fee that Welles had earned from his guest appearance on I Love Lucy. Welles used photo stills and drawings to illustrate the programme. He hoped that future episodes would profile Winston Churchill and P. T. Barnum.

The pilot was unsuccessful: no series was ever commissioned, the pilot was never broadcast, and the one copy owned by Welles has now been deemed lost. However, film historian Joseph McBride believes it to be significant, as it was "an early example of the 'essay film', a genre that would increasingly occupy Welles."
