= The Orson Welles Show =

The Orson Welles Show was an unsold television talk show pilot directed by Orson Welles. It has never been broadcast or released in its entirety. Filming began in September 1978 and the project was completed around February 1979. It ran 74 minutes and was intended for a 90 minute commercial time slot.

Welles was listed in the credits under the pseudonym "G. O. Spelvin". Cinematography was by Welles' long-time cameraman Gary Graver. Editing (and uncredited direction of some scenes) was by Stanley Sheff. Shot partly before a live audience, Welles interviewed Burt Reynolds (taking several questions from the audience), Jim Henson, and Frank Oz, and performed two magic tricks assisted by Angie Dickinson. Several of The Muppets were featured in taped segments, including Kermit the Frog, Fozzie Bear, Gonzo the Great and Animal. Audience questions for the Burt Reynolds Q&A session were scripted, with members of the audience given line readings – this was necessary because, unlike normal talk shows filmed with a multiple-camera setup, the low-budget show was filmed with only one camera, and so it was necessary to do multiple retakes to get multiple camera angles.

The celebrity guest roster reflected Welles' tastes, according to youngest daughter Beatrice Welles, who holds the copyright on the pilot. He enjoyed a close friendship with Reynolds and had brought him to Sedona, Arizona, during the 1970s to meet with wife, Paola Mori, and daughter. As for the Muppets, she said, the legendary filmmaker was "completely taken by them" from the start and likely included them in an attempt to better connect with family viewers.

Welles, Sheff, cinematographer Gary Graver, assistant cameraman Michael Little, and key grip Michael Stringer began shooting the pilot in September 1978 at KCOP-TV in Hollywood. It was edited at Ten Four Productions in Los Angeles then completed the following year.

"The Burt Reynolds segment was (videotaped using) three cameras. The Jim Henson / Frank Oz was two cameras," Sheff told Wellesnet. "We used a film camera for re-shoots. I explained to Orson that video was 30 fps and film 24 fps. If you intercut the two formats it would be noticeable. He said nobody would notice, but I think it looks strange. Some of the inserted footage was used to provide an editing transition where Orson would ask a question to provide a bridge into an unrelated topic. We used a stand-in for a few Burt Reynolds over-the-shoulder shots. All of the magic tricks were single camera film." Sheff guarded the rights and footage for years after Welles’ death to prevent it from falling into public domain.

Several clips from the pilot are included in the 1995 documentary Orson Welles: One Man Band (which was included with the DVD release of Welles' documentary F for Fake) as well as the 2024 Ron Howard documentary Jim Henson Idea Man. The clips feature part of Welles' interview with the Muppets, and show the format was "in the round" with the audience surrounding the panel. One of the clips ends with Welles poking fun at the necessity of having to break for commercials.

Welles admitted with hindsight, "It was frankly an attempt to enter the commercial field and earn my living as a talk show host. It was just a flop, that's all, nobody wanted it."

Beatrice Welles, working with Reeder Brand Management, revealed in March 2023 they were looking for a streamer or label interested in releasing the pilot, along with other Welles television projects.
