= Orson Welles's unrealized projects =

During his long career, American actor and filmmaker Orson Welles had worked on a number of projects which never progressed beyond the pre-production stage or were not completed satisfactorily during production. Welles's reliance on self-production meant that many of his later projects were filmed piecemeal or were not completed. Welles financed his later projects through his own fundraising activities. He often also took on other work to obtain money to fund his own films.

== 1930s ==
=== Too Much Johnson ===
Too Much Johnson is a 1938 comedy film written and directed by Welles. Designed as the cinematic aspect of Welles's Mercury Theatre stage presentation of William Gillette's 1894 comedy, the film was not completely edited or publicly screened. Too Much Johnson was considered a lost film until August 2013, with news reports that a pristine print had been discovered in Italy in 2008. A copy restored by the George Eastman House museum was scheduled to premiere October 9, 2013, at the Pordenone Silent Film Festival, with a U.S. premiere to follow. The film was shown at a single screening at the Los Angeles County Museum of Art on May 3, 2014. A single performance of Too Much Johnson, on February 2, 2015, at the Film Forum in New York City, was a great success. Produced by Bruce Goldstein and adapted and directed by Allen Lewis Rickman, it featured the Film Forum Players with live piano.

=== Heart of Darkness ===
In 1939, Welles intended to make his feature directorial debut with a film adaptation of Joseph Conrad's Heart of Darkness for RKO Pictures. It was planned in extreme detail and some test shots were filmed. The footage is now lost. It was planned to be entirely shot in long takes from the point of view of the narrator, Marlow, who would be played by Welles. His reflection would occasionally be seen in the window as his boat sailed down river. The project was abandoned because it could not be delivered on budget, and Citizen Kane (1941) was made instead.

=== The Smiler with the Knife ===
After Heart of Darkness fell through, Welles quickly turned to an adaptation of Nicholas Blake's thriller The Smiler with the Knife. However, due to problems with casting the central role and established stars being uncertain about working with the inexperienced Welles, the film was never made. Welles suggested Lucille Ball but RKO turned the idea down.

== 1940s ==
=== Santa ===
In 1941, Welles planned a film with his then partner, the Mexican actress Dolores del Río. Santa was adapted from the novel by Mexican writer Federico Gamboa. The film would have marked the debut of del Río in the Mexican cinema. Welles made a correction of the script in 13 extraordinary sequences. The high salary demanded by del Río stopped the project. In 1943, the film was finally completed with the settings of Welles, led by Norman Foster and starring Mexican actress Esther Fernández.

=== Mexican Melodrama ===
Welles wrote an unproduced screenplay titled Mexican Melodrama, which was to have been a film adaptation based on Arthur Calder-Marshall's The Way to Santiago. Dolores del Río would have starred in the film as Elena Medina, "the most beautiful girl in the world," with Welles playing an American who becomes entangled in a mission to disrupt a Nazi plot to overthrow the Mexican government. Welles planned to shoot in Mexico City in 1941, but the Mexican government had to approve the story, and this never occurred.

=== The Life of Christ ===
In 1941, Welles received the support of Bishop Fulton Sheen for a retelling of the life of Christ, to be set in the American West in the 1890s. After filming of Citizen Kane was complete, Welles, Perry Ferguson, and Gregg Toland scouted locations in Baja California and Mexico. Welles wrote a screenplay with dialogue from the Gospels of Mark, Matthew, and Luke. "Every word in the film was to be from the Bible—no original dialogue, but done as a sort of American primitive," Welles said, "set in the frontier country in the last century." The unrealized project was revisited by Welles in the 1950s, when he wrote a second unfilmed screenplay, to be shot in Egypt.

=== It's All True ===
Welles did not originally want to direct It's All True, a 1942 documentary about South America, but after its abandonment by RKO, he spent much of the 1940s attempting to buy the negative of his material from RKO, so that he could edit and release it in some form. The footage remained unseen in vaults for decades and was assumed lost. Over 50 years later, some (but not all) of the surviving material saw release in the 1993 documentary It's All True: Based on an Unfinished Film by Orson Welles.

=== Lady Killer ===
In 1941, Welles intended to write and direct a "dramatized documentary", provisionally entitled Lady Killer, based on the story of French serial killer Henri Désiré Landru. He pitched the idea to Charlie Chaplin, who initially agreed to star in it, but later changed his mind. Instead, Chaplin bought the film rights and turned Welles' story into Monsieur Verdoux (1947). The final film credits Chaplin with the script, "based on an idea by Orson Welles."

=== War and Peace ===
In 1941, producer Alexander Korda announced interest in adapting Leo Tolstoy's War and Peace for the screen, with Welles directing and Merle Oberon starring. The film was to be made in cooperation with the Soviet government. Agnes Moorehead and her husband Jack Lee were also set to star in the production, with Lillian Hellman writing the screenplay, but it was never realized.

=== The Pickwick Papers ===
According to Welles biographer Frank Brady, Welles suggested doing a film version of Charles Dickens' classic novel The Pickwick Papers with W. C. Fields as Pickwick and John Barrymore also in the cast. When later asked about the project however, Welles had no recollection.

=== The Little Prince ===
In 1943, Welles tried to make a live action film with some animation of The Little Prince, and even wrote a screenplay for it. However, a meeting with Walt Disney left him storming out on Welles, saying "There's only room in this project for one genius."

=== Salome ===
In 1946, it was reported that Welles would direct a screen version of Oscar Wilde's play Salome for Alexander Korda in England, to star Paulette Goddard. A script was worked on during filming of The Lady from Shanghai. A framing story was also added to the story in which Welles was to play Wilde. Production was set for the beginning of 1947, but The Lady from Shanghai overran its shooting and the contract became void.

=== Around the World in Eighty Days ===
After Welles's elaborate musical stage version of this Jules Verne novel, encompassing 38 different sets, went live in 1946, Welles shot some test footage in Morocco in 1947 for a film version. The footage was never edited, funding never came through, and Welles abandoned the project. Nine years later, the stage show's producer Mike Todd made his own award-winning film version of the book.

=== Evidence ===
In 1947, Welles purchased the film rights to Isaac Asimov's science fiction short story "Evidence" for $250, with the intention to direct. Asimov thought that he would become famous from a film based on the story, but Welles never used the script.

=== Cyrano de Bergerac ===
Welles spent around nine months around 1947–48 co-writing the screenplay for an adaptation of Cyrano de Bergerac along with Ben Hecht, a project Welles was assigned to direct for Alexander Korda. He began scouting for locations in Europe whilst filming Black Magic, but Korda was short of money, so sold the rights to Columbia Pictures, who eventually dismissed Welles from the project, and then sold the rights to United Artists, who in turn made a film version in 1950, which was not based on Welles's script.

=== Portrait of an Assassin ===
Welles worked on the script of Portrait of an Assassin with Charles Lederer, initially for Erich von Stroheim to direct, which ultimately was not used. According to Welles, he clashed with the film's producers, "They didn't use one word we wrote. But they used the story." Furthermore, he and Lederer received payment from "a black market producer who came to the Lancaster hotel with the money wrapped in newspaper."

== 1950s ==
=== Caesar ===
At around the same time M-G-M was working on its film adaptation of Julius Caesar, Welles had been planning a modern dress version of the play, with financing from Egypt's King Farouk. Welles initially wanted to cast Richard Burton for the role of Brutus. Later, in 1967, he intended to send a copy of his synopsis for the planned adaptation of Julius Caesar to Romaniafilm. However, he clarified to his agent that production would need to be delayed due to "casting troubles." Welles' script, called Caesar, is part of the Beatrice Welles archive at the University of Michigan.

=== The Loves of d'Annunzio and Duse ===
In 1952, Welles wrote this screenplay for Greta Garbo (to play Eleonora Duse) and Charlie Chaplin (to play Gabriele D'Annunzio) and described the project as a story about "two crazy monsters in a state of degenerate hyper-romanticism, with a ridiculous and theatrical passion." However, the film was not produced because neither Garbo nor Chaplin wanted to do it.

=== Paris by Night ===
In 1953, it was reported that Welles would direct Paris by Night for Alexander Korda in England and France. This was a portmanteau film which was to include an episode based on Karen Blixen's short story "The Old Chevalier".

=== "The Tragedy of Lurs" ===
Welles had worked on a seventh episode of his travelogue series Around the World with Orson Welles entitled "The Tragedy of Lurs," which was not completed. The documentary was based on the controversial Dominici murder case in France, and contained interviews with many of the principals shortly after the trial. A version of the film, using Welles's footage and additional sound, was constructed by French filmmaker Christophe Cognet and integrated into his 52-minute documentary titled The Dominici Affair by Orson Welles (2000).

=== Moby Dick–Rehearsed ===
Moby Dick—Rehearsed was a film version of Welles's 1955 London meta-play, starring Gordon Jackson, Christopher Lee, Patrick McGoohan, and with Welles as Ahab. Using bare, minimalist sets, Welles alternated between a cast of nineteenth-century actors rehearsing a production of Moby Dick, with scenes from Moby Dick itself. Kenneth Williams, a cast member who was apprehensive about the entire project, recorded in his autobiography that Welles's dim, atmospheric stage lighting made some of the footage so dark as to be unwatchable. The entire play was filmed but is now presumed lost. This was made during one weekend at the Hackney Empire theater.

=== Tip on a Dead Jockey ===
Originally slated to be produced in 1955, Tip on a Dead Jockey first had Welles signed as director, though he would be replaced by Richard Thorpe.

=== Don Quixote ===
As early as 1955, Welles began work on Don Quixote, initially a commission from CBS television. Welles expanded the film to feature length, developing the screenplay to take Quixote and Sancho Panza into the modern age. Filming began in 1957 and proceeded for several years until the death of actor Francisco Reiguera in 1969, who had played Quixote. Welles continued editing the film into the early 1970s. At the time of his death, the film remained largely a collection of footage in various states of editing. The project and, more important, Welles's conception of the project changed radically over time. A version Oja Kodar supervised, with help from Jesús Franco, assistant director during production, was released in 1992 to poor reviews. Frederick Muller, the film editor for The Trial, Chimes at Midnight, and the CBS Special Orson's Bag, worked on editing three reels of the original, unadulterated version. When asked in 2013 by a journalist of Time Out for his opinion, he said that he felt that if released without image re-editing but with the addition of "ad hoc" sound and music, it probably would have been rather successful.

=== Volpone ===
Since 1955, Welles intended to adapt to film Ben Jonson's Volpone. In 1967, he returned to the project after withdrawing from the production of The Master Builder, wanting CMA produce it. Welles discussed making the film with Laurence Harvey. Columbia Pictures was interested, but with the studio's other commitments, Volpone would need to be postponed until spring 1968. When asked who would direct, Harvey replied, "Orson or I will or both of us together."

== 1960s ==
=== Lord Jim ===
In the early 1960s, Welles scripted an adaptation of Joseph Conrad's Lord Jim. The screenplay is now considered lost. According to Peter Bogdanovich, Welles was disappointed with Richard Brooks' 1965 film version of the novel, particularly the opening scene: "The opening scene of the book is one of great calm. But as Orson tells it, 'It was changed to a storm at sea! Can you imagine the vulgarity of a mind like that? If I was police commissioner of the world, I'd put Richard Brooks in jail for what he did to Lord Jim!' "

=== Catch-22 ===
In 1962, Welles first tried to purchase the rights to Joseph Heller's novel Catch-22 to independently produce and direct, but was unsuccessful. He would end up being cast for the role of General Dreedle in the eventual 1970 adaptation, which was directed by Mike Nichols.

=== Treasure Island ===
Welles wrote two screenplays for Treasure Island in the 1960s, and was eager to seek financial backing to direct it. His plan was to film it in Spain in concert with Chimes at Midnight. Welles intended to play the part of Long John Silver. He wanted Keith Baxter to play Doctor Livesey and John Gielgud to take on the role of Squire Trelawney. Australian-born child actor Fraser MacIntosh (The Boy Cried Murder), then 11-years old, was cast as Jim Hawkins and flown to Spain for the shoot, which would have been directed by Jess Franco. About 70 percent of the Chimes at Midnight cast would have had roles in Treasure Island. However, funding for the project fell through. Eventually, Welles's own screenplay (under the pseudonym of O.W. Jeeves) was further rewritten, and formed the basis of the 1972 film version directed by John Hough, in which Welles played Long John Silver.

=== The Deep ===
The Deep, an adaptation of Charles Williams's Dead Calm, was entirely set on two boats and shot mostly in close-ups. It was filmed off the coasts of Yugoslavia and the Bahamas between 1966 and 1969, with all but one scene completed. It was originally planned as a commercially viable thriller, to show that Welles could make a popular, successful film. It was put on hold in 1970 when Welles worried that critics would not respond favorably to this film as his theatrical follow-up to the much-lauded Chimes at Midnight, and Welles focused instead on F for Fake. It was abandoned altogether in 1973, perhaps due to the death of its star Laurence Harvey. In a 2015 interview, Oja Kodar blamed Welles's failure to complete the film on Jeanne Moreau's refusal to participate in its dubbing.

=== The Private Life of Henry VIII ===
In July 1967, while discussing the possibility of making The Deep, then titled Dead Reckoning, with Romaniafilm, Welles was in talks with the company for a film called The Private Life of Henry VIII.

=== The Master Builder ===
In addition to Henry VIII, that same year Welles also in talks to do an adaptation of Henrik Ibsen's The Master Builder through CMA's agent Peter Rawley. When Faye Dunaway joined the cast as Hilda Wangel, Welles immediately withdrew from the project, much to Rawley's shock.

=== Sarajevo ===
Also in 1967, Welles struck a deal with Bosna Film to write and direct Sarajevo, an epic story of the 1878 battle based on the book by Vladimir Dedijer. Welles presented a four-page outline of this proposed film's script, however he was not paid the $10,000 he was owed by the end of that year. Welles' Italy-based lawyer then tried to create ties between Bosna Film and Dino De Laurentiis, but this did not pan out. The material on this project is currently unavailable.

=== Spirits of the Dead segments ===
The producers of Spirits of the Dead, a 1968 anthology film based on short stories by Edgar Allan Poe, announced in June 1967 that Welles would direct one segment based on both "The Masque of the Red Death" and "The Cask of Amontillado" for the omnibus film. Welles withdrew in September 1967 and was replaced. The script, written in English by Welles and Oja Kodar, is kept in the Filmmuseum München collections at the Munich Film Archive.

=== The Heroine ===
In the late 1960s, Welles attempted to make a short film titled The Heroine, which was to have been based on Isak Dinesen's story of the same name. The filming of the short, which occurred in Budapest, was cancelled after a single day when Welles found out his financier was broke.

=== One Man Band ===
This Monty Python-esque spoof in which Welles plays all but one of the characters (including two characters in drag), was made around 1968–9. Welles intended this completed sketch to be one of several items in a television special on London. Other items filmed for this special—all included in the "One Man Band" documentary by his partner Oja Kodar—comprised a sketch on Winston Churchill (played in silhouette by Welles), a sketch on peers in a stately home, a feature on London gentlemen's clubs, and a sketch featuring Welles being mocked by his snide Savile Row tailor (played by Charles Gray).

=== Santo Spirito ===
According to Oja Kodar, while still in production on The Deep in early 1969, Welles wrote the original comic story Santo Spirito. The screenplay follows two sailors who flee their gambling debts and embark on a bizarre series of misadventures; partnering with an heiress who murders her homosexual millionaire husband, being captured by cross-dressing female pirates with names such as "Black Tiger", "Dirty Gertie", "Sugar-Tit", "Snag-Tooth Miriam", "Juicy Jane", "Pick-Your-Nose Wilma", "Poxie Doxy" and "Daisy La Rouge", and finally being drafted into the army as a reward and dying in the Battle of Waterloo. The film was developed with Jane Fonda and Pearl Bailey in mind to star. Screenplay notes, available to be read at the University of Michigan, also indicate Edward G. Robinson or George Raft to play the role of Beau Skouras, a gangster in the casino at the beginning.

=== The Merchant of Venice ===
In 1969, Welles was given a TV commission to film a condensed adaptation of The Merchant of Venice. Welles completed the film by 1970, but the finished negative was later mysteriously stolen from his Rome production office. A restored and reconstructed version of the film, made by using the original script and composer's notes, premiered at pre-opening ceremonies of the 72nd Venice International Film Festival, alongside Othello, in 2015.

== 1970s ==
=== The Other Side of the Wind ===
In 1970, Welles began shooting The Other Side of the Wind. The film relates the efforts of a film director (played by John Huston) to complete his last Hollywood picture and is largely set at a lavish party. By 1972 the filming was reported by Welles as being "96% complete," though by 1979 Welles had only edited about 40 minutes of the film. In that year, legal complications over the ownership of the film put the negative into a Paris vault. In 2004, director Peter Bogdanovich, who acted in the film, announced his intention to complete the production. On October 28, 2014, Los Angeles-based production company Royal Road Entertainment announced it had negotiated an agreement, with the assistance of producer Frank Marshall, and would purchase the rights to complete and release The Other Side of the Wind. Bogdanovich and Marshall planned to complete Welles's nearly finished film in Los Angeles, aiming to have it ready for screening on May 6, 2015, the 100th anniversary of Welles's birth. Royal Road Entertainment and German producer Jens Koethner Kaul acquired the rights held by Les Films de l'Astrophore and the late Mehdi Boushehri. They reached an agreement with Oja Kodar, who inherited Welles's ownership of the film, and Beatrice Welles, manager of the Welles estate, but at the end of 2015, efforts to complete the film were at an impasse. In March 2017, Netflix acquired distribution rights to the film. That month, the original negative, dailies and other footage arrived in Los Angeles for post-production, the film was completed in 2018. The film premiered at the 75th Venice International Film Festival on August 31, 2018. On November 2, 2018, the film debuted in select theaters and Netflix, 48 years after principal photography began. Some footage is included in the documentaries Working with Orson Welles (1993), Orson Welles: One Man Band (1995), and most extensively They'll Love Me When I'm Dead (2018).

=== Ada or Ardor: A Family Chronicle ===
Welles admired Vladimir Nabokov's novel Ada or Ardor: A Family Chronicle and initiated a film project of the same title in collaboration with the author. Welles flew to Paris to discuss the project personally with Nabokov, because at that time the Russian author moved from America to Europe. Welles and Nabokov had a promising discussion, but the project was not finished.

=== Orson Welles' Magic Show ===
Between the years of 1976 and 1985, Welles had worked on a television special that would showcase him performing various magic tricks for the camera, promising that no trick photography was used. The project remained unfinished following Welles' death, however the complete footage has since been edited into a 27-minute cut.

=== The Dead Giveaway ===
In 1976, Welles agreed to co-adapt, with Gary Graver, A Hell of a Woman by Jim Thompson. Graver optioned the novel for $2,000, and the two proceeded to write the script, changing the title to The Dead Giveaway. Graver intended to direct the film, with Bud Cort as Dolly Dillon, Welles as Staples, and Jocelyn Brando as the aunt.

=== Saint Jack ===
In 1978, Welles was lined up by his long-time protégé Peter Bogdanovich (who was then acting as Welles's de facto agent), to direct Saint Jack, an adaptation of Paul Theroux's 1973 novel about an American pimp in Singapore. Hugh Hefner and Bogdanovich's then-partner Cybill Shepherd were both attached to the project as producers, with Hefner providing finance through his Playboy productions. However, both Hefner and Shepherd became convinced that Bogdanovich himself would be a more commercially viable director than Welles and insisted that Bogdanovich take over. Since Bogdanovich was also in need of work after a series of box office flops, he agreed. When the film was finally made in 1979 by Bogdanovich and Hefner (but without Welles or Shepherd's participation), Welles felt betrayed and according to Bogdanovich the two "drifted apart a bit."

=== Filming The Trial ===
After the success of his 1978 documentary Filming Othello made for West German television, and mostly consisting of a monolog to the camera, Welles began shooting scenes for this follow-up based on the production of his film The Trial, but never completed it. Welles did however conduct an 80-minute question-and-answer session in 1981 with film students asking about the film. The footage was kept by Welles's cinematographer Gary Graver, who donated it to the Munich Film Museum, which then pieced it together with Welles's trailer for the film, into an 83-minute film which is occasionally screened at film festivals.

=== The Other Man ===
In the late 1970s, Welles and Oja Kodar worked on an adaptation of Graham Greene's 1973 novel The Honorary Consul, which they renamed as The Other Man.

== 1980s ==
=== The Dreamers ===
In the 1980s, Welles attempted to make The Dreamers, which he co-wrote with Oja Kodar. Hal Ashby's production company Northstar was to have financed the project but backed out upon reading the script. Henry Jaglom also attempted to finance the project.

=== Revenge ===
Ashby's company Northstar was also set to finance a Welles film based on Jim Harrison's novel Revenge, that was set to star Jack Nicholson. Tony Scott would go on to direct the 1990 adaptation.

=== The Dresser ===
Also in the early 1980s, Welles and Michael Caine discussed a film adaptation of Ronald Harwood's play The Dresser, which would soon be adapted in 1983, without either of their involvement. Caine later dubbed it the best film he never made.

=== The Big Brass Ring ===
Written by Welles with Oja Kodar, The Big Brass Ring was adapted and filmed by director George Hickenlooper in partnership with writer F. X. Feeney. Both the Welles script and the 1999 film center on a U.S. presidential hopeful in his 40s, his elderly mentor—a former candidate for the Presidency, brought low by homosexual scandal—and the Italian journalist probing for the truth of the relationship between these men. During the last years of his life, Welles struggled to get financing for the planned film, and his efforts to cast a star as the main character were unsuccessful. Jack Nicholson, Robert Redford, Warren Beatty, Clint Eastwood, Burt Reynolds and Paul Newman turned down the role for various reasons.

=== The Cradle Will Rock ===
In 1984, Welles wrote the screenplay for a film he planned to direct, an autobiographical drama about the 1937 staging of The Cradle Will Rock. Rupert Everett was slated to play the young Welles. However, Welles was unable to acquire funding. Tim Robbins wrote and directed a 1999 historical drama film that fictionalizes the true events.

=== King Lear ===
At the time of his death, Welles was in talks with a French production company to direct a film version of the Shakespeare play King Lear, in which he would also play the title role.

== See also ==
- Orson Welles filmography
