= The Merchant of Venice (1969 film) =

1969 unfinished film directed by Orson Welles

- A screenshot of the restored film, depicting Shylock
- Directed by: Orson Welles
- Written by: Orson Welles
- Based on: The Merchant of Venice by William Shakespeare
- Produced by: Orson Welles
- Starring: Orson Welles; Charles Gray; Irina Maleeva
- Cinematography: Tomislav Pinter; Ivica Rajković; Giorgio Tonti
- Music by: Francesco Lavagnino
- Release date: September 1, 2015 (VIFF)
- Running time: 35 minutes
- Countries: United States; Italy; Yugoslavia
- Language: English

The Merchant of Venice is a 1969 drama short film directed by Orson Welles based on William Shakespeare's play of the same name. While actually completed, it is frequently cited as an unfinished film, though better described as a partially lost film due to the loss of film elements.

== Cast ==
- Orson Welles as Shylock.
- Charles Gray as Antonio.
- Irina Maleeva as Jessica.
- Jonathan Lynn as Tubal.
- Anthony Ainley as Bassanio.
- Dorian Bond as Launcelot Gobbo.

Further cast members were Bill Cronshaw, Mauro Bonanni and Nina Palinkas. Bonnani was not a professional actor, but an editor who was then working on Welles's Don Quixote, while Palinkas was the younger sister of Oja Kodar, whose real name was Olga Palinkas.

== Production ==
Differing sources give the film's running time as between 30 and 40 minutes. Welles started work on the film in 1969. It was originally produced as part of his abandoned 90-minute television special, Orson's Bag, which was made for CBS; but later that year, with the project close to completion, CBS withdrew their funding over Welles' long-running disputes with US authorities regarding his tax status, and so Welles completed the film as an independent project.

Filming commenced in Venice, but when financial troubles began, production was relocated to Dubrovnik, and parts of the Dalmatian Coast, which were less expensive to film in and doubled for Venice; and filming was completed in Rome, where Welles was editing Don Quixote. The film itself was a shortened version of the play, Welles even eliminated the character of Portia from the film after his mistress Oja Kodar declined the role, due to her then-limited knowledge of English. Francesco Lavagnino, who had written the musical scores of Welles's previous two Shakespeare films, Othello (1952) and Chimes at Midnight (1966), provided a full musical score for this film.

Welles completed the film in the summer of 1969, and gave a preview screening to Oja Kodar and her mother in Rome. Shortly after the screening, two of the three workprint reels were stolen, with only the first reel remaining. The original negative has survived, but it lacks any sound; and in the absence of a workprint it is impossible to tell how the silent negative material should be edited together, or to restore the original sound.

In the early 1970s, Welles filmed the Shylock monologue wearing a modern-day trenchcoat, although it is unclear how this footage would have been used. Several takes were made, and reports differ as to whether these were made in the Arizona desert, in France, or near Malaga, Spain (different takes may have been taken in each of these places), and some of these can be seen in the documentary Orson Welles: The One Man Band (1995), along with clips from the first third of The Merchant of Venice.

== Legacy ==
Welles left all his materials from his incomplete film projects, including this one, to Oja Kodar, and she in turn donated these materials to the Munich Filmmuseum, which created the compilation Orson Welles's Shylock in 2001, integrating the first eight minutes of the film, and the Shylock-in-a-trenchcoat footage later shot by Welles. Additional elements are at the Cinémathèque Française, and in the hands of private collectors. The last two reels of the workprint have never resurfaced.

== Restoration ==
A restored and reconstructed version of the film, made by using the original script and composer's notes, premiered at the 72nd Venice International Film Festival alongside Othello as part of the pre-opening ceremonies.
