= Dead Calm =

Dead Calm may refer to:

- Dead Calm (painting), an 1827 painting by Augustus Wall Callcott
- Dead Calm (novel), a 1963 novel by Charles F. Williams
- Dead Calm (film), a 1989 Australian film based on the novel
- "Dead Calm" (Outer Banks), an American television episode
- Dead Calm (musician), an alias of Irish musician Liam McCay/Sign Crushes Motorist
