= Alfred Pizella =

Italian-born French actor and singer

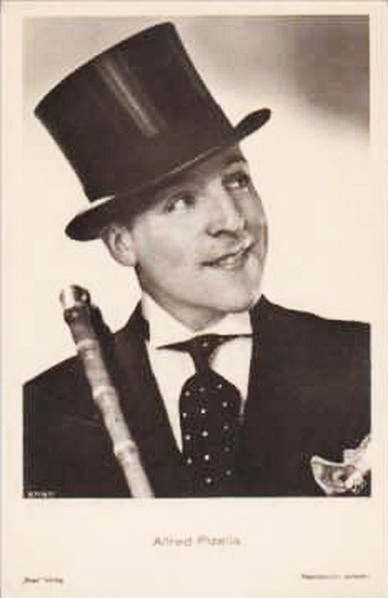
- Pizella in 1930.
- Born: 29 March 1897; Naples, Italy
- Died: 9 August 1937 (aged 40); Sainte-Colombe-la-Commanderie, France
- Occupations: Singer, actor
- Years active: 1931–1937 (film)

Alfred Pizella (March 29, 1897 – August 9, 1937) was an Italian-born French singer and film actor. A star of the music halls he was often billed simply as Pizella leading to some confusion with the journalist and occasional actor Stéphane Pizella. He died in August 1937 in a car accident returning from Deauville.

== Selected filmography ==
- Gagne ta vie (1931)
- Paris-Soleil (1933)
- The Path to Happiness (1934)
- Les Époux célibataires (1935)
- Les Deux Favoris (1936)
- The Blue Mouse (1936)
- La Peau d'un autre (1937)

== Bibliography ==
- Bessy, Maurice & Chirat, Raymond. Histoire du cinéma français: encyclopédie des films, Volume 2. Pygmalion, 1986.
- Simon, Laurent. Paris Céline. Du Lérot, 2007.
