= Bluebelle (ship) =

Sailing ship; site of 1961 mass murder

- Bluebelle, c. 1960

History
- Name: Bluebelle
- Owner: Harold Pegg
- Port of registry: United States
- Launched: 1928. Sturgeon Bay, Wisconsin, U.S.
- Out of service: November 12, 1961
- Home port: Bahia Mar Marina
- Fate: Scuttled November 12, 1961

General characteristics
- Type: Ketch
- Length: 60-foot (18 m)
- Installed power: 115-hp
- Complement: Arthur Duperrault† (40), Jean Duperrault† (38), Brian Duperrault† (14), René Duperrault† (7), Terry Jo Duperrault (sole complement survivor) (11)
- Crew: Julian Harvey (sole crew survivor; later, suicide) (44), Mary Dene Harvey† (34)

Bluebelle was a 60-foot (18 m) twin-masted sailing ketch based out of Fort Lauderdale, Florida. The ship was scuttled following an act of mass murder by the ship's captain, Julian Harvey, on November 12, 1961. Harvey died by suicide on November 17 within hours of receiving news that 11-year-old Terry Jo Duperrault had survived the scuttling. She had been rescued at sea three and a half days after the incident, having drifted upon a small cork dinghy without food, water, or shelter for approximately 82 hours.

Terry Jo's survival led to her becoming known within international media as the "Sea Waif" and the "Sea Orphan."

== Background ==
The final complement of the Bluebelle consisted of 40-year-old Arthur Duperrault, his wife Jean (38), and their three children: Brian (14), Terry Jo (11), and René (7). Arthur Duperrault was a successful contact lens optometrist. The Duperrault family resided in Green Bay, Wisconsin, and Arthur had long dreamed of taking his wife and children on a week-long family cruise from the Florida Keys to the Bahamas, which he had sailed during his World War II service, as opposed to the family facing another cold Wisconsin winter.

The Duperraults spent several years saving money for this opulent experience, and had saved enough by the summer of 1961. The family planned to spend a week living at sea aboard a chartered yacht in a warm climate, docking at several chosen locations and possibly extending the sabbatical if all enjoyed themselves. They arrived in Fort Lauderdale in early November, where they chartered the 60-foot (18 m) ketch Bluebelle, stationed at the Bahia Mar Marina, for $515.

Arthur hired a well-known local yachtsman, 44-year-old Julian Harvey (with whom he was acquainted), to skipper the vessel for $100 per day. Harvey's sixth wife, 34-year-old former stewardess and aspiring writer Mary Dene Harvey (née Jordan), was also appointed to serve as a cook on the ketch.

=== Final voyage ===
The Duperrault family boarded Bluebelle at around midday on Wednesday, November 8, 1961. The vessel was last seen leaving port early that afternoon.

Over the following four days, the family traveled to locations such as Bimini and Sandy Point, where they purchased souvenirs and engaged in activities such as snorkeling. On November 12, at their final port of call prior to returning to Florida, Arthur and Captain Harvey visited the office of British district commissioner Roderick Pinder, to whom Arthur stated: "This has been a once-in-a-lifetime vacation", adding, "We'll be back before Christmas." That evening, all aboard Bluebelle ate a meal of chicken cacciatore and salad. Shortly thereafter, 11-year-old Terry Jo walked below deck to her sleeping cabin as the rest of her family and the Harveys remained on deck.

== Initial rescue ==
At approximately 12:35 p.m. on Monday, November 13, a crew member aboard the oil tanker Gulf Lion observed a man waving frantically from a dinghy drifting in their direction and shouting, "Help! I have a dead baby on board!" Pulling the man aboard, crew members observed the deceased body of a red-haired prepubescent girl wearing a life jacket inside the dinghy.

The man identified himself as Julian Harvey, skipper of the ketch Bluebelle. Harvey explained that at approximately 8:30 the previous evening, his small vessel was hit by a sudden, strong squall that caused Bluebelle to rapidly keel over and the main mast to snap at a location between the Abaco Islands and Great Stirrup Cay, slightly injuring his wife, Mary Dene, and Arthur Dupperault and piercing the ship's hull. According to Harvey, he was completely separated from all others on board the ketch by this falling mast and the resultant loose rigging, which pulled down the mizzen mast. He attempted to retrieve a wire cutter from the cabin to clear the deck space, but a sudden fire broke out on board the small vessel, and he was not able to rescue his wife or any of his passengers.

Forced to abandon the ketch alone on a dinghy, the body of seven-year-old René had soon floated by, and he had retrieved her body and attempted to revive the child. Unsuccessful in this medical effort, he had kept her body alongside him in the raft out of respect. (An autopsy later revealed the child had died of drowning.)

=== Harvey's questioning ===
Taken to Nassau, Harvey was questioned by authorities. Although his calm demeanor and the fact his dinghy had been filled with various survival supplies caused some to initially express serious doubts as to his claims, his story could not be disproven, and he was allowed to return to Miami on November 15 to face further questioning by the United States Coast Guard.

Terry Jo Duperrault, pictured immediately before her rescue by the Captain Theo

== Second rescue ==
Three days later, on November 16, a child was rescued in the Northwest Providence Channel by the Greek freighter Captain Theo. (Note: The Captain Theo had been traveling from Antwerp to Houston.) Second officer Nicolaos Spachidakis observed her floating aboard a 2 by 5 foot (0.61 m × 1.52 m) cork float approximately one mile (1.6 km) from the freighter. Spachidakis immediately summoned Captain Stylianos Coutsodontis to the bridge, and the two gradually realized Spachidakis' sighting was not a fishing vessel, but a small, oblong white raft carrying a young blonde-haired child dressed in a white cotton blouse and pink corduroy slacks, leaning backward and waving feebly. The captain ordered the freighter's engines stopped and a life raft lowered. Noting sharks circling close to the cork float, crew members shouted at the child not to jump into the water while one crew member, Evangelos Kantzilas, lifted her aboard the raft. She was then hoisted aboard Captain Theo and placed in a spare cabin. (Note: A photograph taken by a crewman aboard the Captain Theo of Terry Jo immediately prior to her rescue appeared upon the front pages of newspapers internationally.)

Aboard the freighter, the crew discovered the child was incoherent and barely able to speak. She was given water and orange juice as salt was sponged from her body with wet towels and Vaseline applied to her lips. (Note: Coutsodontis later recollected Terry Jo was "dazed and unable to speak" for approximately thirty minutes after her rescue.) She hoarsely identified herself as 11-year-old Terry Jo Duperrault, informing the crew that she had been floating aboard the cork float for several days after the sinking of her vessel. Her ability to speak rapidly waned, and the child soon responded to questions by weakly gesticulating, before lapsing into a semi-comatose state.

The crew of Captain Theo did not retrieve the cork float upon which Terry Jo had drifted for almost four days. However, a member of the Coast Guard did locate and retrieve the raft from the ocean several days later.

=== Recuperation ===
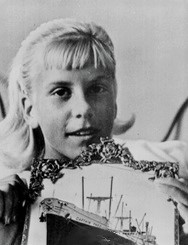
Terry Jo Duperrault, pictured holding a photograph of the Captain Theo six days after her rescue

Coutsodontis immediately informed the Coast Guard of their discovery and Terry Jo's medical predicament, and a rescue helicopter was soon summoned. Terry Jo—suffering from severe sunburn, dehydration, and exposure—was airlifted to a Miami hospital in a critical condition. There, the child began to slowly recuperate, although for over two days she was unable to divulge to police or the Coast Guard the circumstances surrounding her rescue and the truth of what had actually happened to her family and Mary Dene Harvey.

== Terry Jo's statement ==
By November 20, Terry Jo had regained sufficient strength to reveal to investigators the truth about the loss of Bluebelle and its passengers.

Late on November 12, Bluebelle began its return journey to Fort Lauderdale. At around 9 p.m., Terry Jo had entered the lower cabin to sleep, leaving her parents, siblings, Harvey, and his wife on deck. Later that evening, she was awakened by the sounds of her brother screaming and calling for their father, and heavy footfalls, which she decided to investigate. Above deck, she observed the dead bodies of her brother and mother in the main cabin, not far from the galley. (Note: The main cabin aboard Bluebelle served as a kitchen and dining room during the day, but was converted into a bedroom at night.)

Walking further onto the deck, Terry Jo then observed Harvey carrying a bucket. He simply struck her, then shoved her below deck, shouting, "Get back down there!" The terrified child returned to her cabin only to observe oil and water beginning to gush onto the floor of her cabin approximately fifteen minutes later. Harvey then entered her cabin with what appeared to be a rifle in his right hand. The two made eye contact, but Harvey did not shoot her; he simply returned above deck. Terry Jo then heard hammering sounds.

Shortly thereafter, Terry Jo was forced to abandon her rapidly flooding cabin. She returned to the deck, only to observe Harvey standing on the deck and the vessel's dinghy floating on the port side. He then asked her, "Is the dinghy loose?", to which she replied she did not know. Harvey then ordered her to hold a rope attached to the dinghy while he retrieved something. By the time Harvey returned to the child, the rope had slipped through her fingers. In response, Harvey dove overboard and swam toward the dinghy, abandoning Terry Jo on the sinking vessel.

Recollecting the small oblong cork float lashed to the deck, Terry Jo untied this float as the boat deck began to sink beneath the ocean. She then threw the float overboard and swam toward the life raft, pushing the float further into the open water before climbing onto it. She then drifted upon the sea for almost three and a half days without food, water, or shelter. Her life raft had been so small that Terry Jo had to sit upright for the entire ordeal, during which she had repeatedly prayed for rescue.

Terry Jo was adamant that the mast of Bluebelle was intact, that there had been no fire aboard the vessel, and that the sea was calm throughout the entirety of the events prior to the sinking. Shortly thereafter, she was informed that Harvey had been picked up alive three days prior to herself in a life raft, alongside her sister's dead body, and that the bodies of her parents, her brother, and Harvey's wife had all been lost at sea.

== November 16 inquiry ==
On November 16, Harvey reiterated his story to Coast Guard investigators that a sudden squall had brought down Bluebelle's masts, holing the ship's hull, rupturing the auxiliary gas tank, and starting a fire, the circumstances of which made it impossible for him to rescue his wife or any member of the Duperrault family. Harvey also claimed he had found René's body floating in the water and that he had tried unsuccessfully to revive the child.

=== Harvey's suicide ===
On November 17, midway through Harvey's scheduled interrogation, he was informed that Terry Jo had been rescued the previous day, and that her condition was improving. His response was to exclaim, "Oh my God!", before quickly and calmly adding, "Isn't that wonderful?" A lieutenant, Ernest Murdoch, then informed Harvey that an official investigation into the loss of Bluebelle and her passengers was to be launched that day. Shortly thereafter, Harvey asked to be excused from further interrogation, claiming he was tired and that he wished to speak with his wife's family. His request was granted.

Harvey then drove a short distance toward Biscayne Boulevard, where he checked into the Sandman Motel under the assumed name of John Monroe, paying cash for a room. He then penned a two-page suicide note before committing suicide by slashing his thigh, ankles, and jugular vein with a razor blade in the motel bathroom. His body was found by a maid approximately two hours later. The suicide note—addressed to a close friend from his days of military service—was found on a dresser within the room adjacent to his body. This note left no explanations or apologies for his actions, but simply ended with the words: "I got too tired and nervous. I couldn't stand it any longer." The note also requested the recipient take care of his fourteen-year-old son, Lance, and that he was to be buried at sea.

== Inquiry conclusion ==
"Arthur Duperrault, Jean Duperrault, Brian Duperrault and Mary (Dene) Harvey lost their lives at the hands of Julian A. Harvey prior to the sinking of the vessel. The exact nature of the circumstances whereby these lives were taken or the order in which they perished cannot be ascertained. The most probable cause of the casualty was the state of mind of Julian A. Harvey at about 11:30 p.m. November 12 (1961)."

— Section of the United States Coast Guard's official report into the loss of the Bluebelle. April 25, 1962.

Given such clear evidence of foul play from the sole survivor of Bluebelle and Harvey's subsequent suicide, an investigation was launched into Harvey's recent history. This inquiry revealed that Harvey, a decorated World War II veteran and Korean War pilot, had difficulty holding a job for any length of time, had serious financial problems, and had recently arranged a double indemnity insurance policy on the life of his wife just two months after their July 1961 marriage. Furthermore, just one month prior to the Duperrault family chartering Bluebelle, Harvey had been hired by the vessel's owner, businessman Harold Pegg, to take any tourists to sea upon their desired cruises in exchange for $300 a month and free accommodation aboard the ketch. This agreement may have formulated Harvey's plan to murder his wife at sea and then claim that she had vanished, with tourists viewed in his mind as valuable witnesses to corroborate his claims. The Harveys' first chartered clients were the Duperrault family.

The conclusion of the inquiry was that Harvey had planned to kill his wife to collect on her $20,000 double indemnity insurance policy, which would yield double the insured sum if she died accidentally. However, Harvey may have been observed by Arthur either in the act of the murder of his wife or the disposal of her body. He had then proceeded to kill Arthur, his wife, and two of his children, who may also have witnessed their parents' murders. Furthermore, Harvey had likely retrieved René's body from the ocean to add credibility to his story.

In closure, the inquiry concluded that, had Harvey not committed suicide, he would have been prosecuted for the murder of all those who had died aboard Bluebelle, and for the attempted murder of Terry Jo.

=== Previous insurance fraud ===
Searching further into Harvey's background, investigators discovered he had previously survived a 1949 car accident that had killed the second of his previous five wives and her mother, when a 1946 Plymouth De Luxe he had been driving plunged off a bridge at high speed into a bayou on a rainy night and in which he had swum to safety, leaving his wife, Joan, and her mother, Myrtle May Burgess Boylan, to drown. One of Harvey's yawls, the Torbatross, had also previously sunk after running into the submerged wreckage of the warship San Marcos, which had sunk in 1911 in shallow water within the Chesapeake Bay. Crew members onboard had repeatedly warned Harvey to steer his yawl clear of the wreckage, but he had repeatedly navigated his vessel around the prohibited site, claiming to his cruise passengers to be attempting to read an inscription upon a buoy marking the site. Harvey's powerboat, the Valiant, had also sunk under suspicious circumstances off the coast of Cuba in 1958. All these losses and tragedies had yielded large insurance settlements from which Harvey had financially benefitted.

== Adjustment to maritime regulations ==
The circumstances surrounding Terry Jo's rescue upon an adrift cork float of a nondescript color, difficult to notice in the sea, ultimately resulted in recommendations to amend specifications for "buoyant apparatus, life floats and life rafts" to be international orange in color in order for shipwreck survivors to be noticed. These maritime recommendations—detailed within the U.S. Coast Guard Investigating Officer's report pertaining to Terry Jo's rescue—were officially adopted from 1962 onward.

== Aftermath ==
Following the loss of her family, Terry Jo returned to Green Bay to live with her father's sister, her grandmother, and three cousins in the city of De Pere. She refused to part with the blouse and slacks she was wearing at the time of her rescue. The following year, she changed her first name to Tere—in part due to her refusal to be viewed as a victim. Due to contemporary psychological coping strategies in the early 1960s, authority figures very seldom spoke with Tere Jo about her ordeal, and she received no trauma counseling. Consequently, she did not speak publicly about the loss of her family and her survival ordeal for over twenty years.

Tere Jo later married and bore three children. As an adult, she chose to live and work close to the ocean. She is now retired and resides in Kewaunee, Wisconsin.

In 2010, Tere Jo released her memoir Alone: Orphaned on the Ocean. Co-authored with psychologist and survival expert Richard Logan, this book details her family's final cruise, Harvey's murder of her family and his wife, the three and a half days she spent drifting upon the cork float prior to her rescue, and her life in the years since.

Some individuals, including writer Erle Stanley Gardner, have speculated as to why Harvey did not murder Terry Jo upon Bluebelle. Gardner has speculated Harvey may have actually subconsciously wanted to be caught and punished for his actions. However, Logan and others have theorized that Harvey had actually intended to kill her, but when Terry Jo accidentally dropped the rope connected to his dinghy, he was forced to dive overboard in order to prevent its floating away without him, and thus left her alive on the sinking ship, believing she would not survive.

The circumstances surrounding the murders aboard the Bluebelle and Terry Jo's subsequent rescue from the ocean are believed to have been a partial inspiration for Charles Williams's 1963 crime fiction novel Dead Calm, which was later adapted into a movie.

Forty-nine years after her ordeal, Tere Jo granted a televised interview with NBC personality Matt Lauer, in which she stated: "I think he probably thought I would go down with the ship." She also stated her belief Harvey had originally intended to discreetly murder his wife and dispose of her body, later to claim she was lost at sea, but that she likely fought her husband, attracting the attention of the Duperrault family. Tere Jo has also stated she does not wish for people to reflect upon her ordeal and opine, "Gee, that poor little girl", but rather to think to themselves, "She has gone on with her life." She further stated she has "always believed I was saved for a reason ... if one person heals from a life tragedy [after reading my story], my journey will have been worth it."

== Media ==
=== Literature ===
- Logan, Richard; Duperrault Fassbender, Tere Jo (2010). Alone: Orphaned on the Ocean. Wisconsin: Titletown Publishing. ISBN 978-0-982-72063-9.
- McIver, Stuart (1995). Murder in the Tropics: The Florida Chronicles. Volume 2. Sarasota, Florida: Pineapple Press. ISBN 978-1-561-64079-9.
- Sheppard, Nancy E. (2018). Hampton Roads Murder and Mayhem. Charleston, South Carolina: The History Press. ISBN 978-1-439-66538-1.
- Snow, Edward Rowe (2008) [1962]. Women of the Sea. Carlisle, Massachusetts: Commonwealth Editions. ISBN 978-1-933-21286-9.

=== Television ===
- Tere Jo appeared on a September 1988 episode of the U.S. talk show The Oprah Winfrey Show. On this episode, she was reunited with Stylianos Coutsodontis, the captain of the Greek freighter who had rescued her.
- The morning television show Today aired an interview with Tere Jo in 2010. In this interview, she discussed her survival ordeal and her theory as to why Harvey did not murder her before abandoning her on the sinking vessel. This episode aired on May 6.

== See also ==
- Insurance fraud – Defrauding of insurance
- Survivor guilt – Mental condition

== Cited works and further reading ==
- Chermak, Steven; Bailey, Frankie (2016). Crimes of the Centuries: Notorious Crimes, Criminals, and Criminal Trials in American History. Santa Barbara: ABC-CLIO. ISBN 978-1-610-69593-0.
- Cole, Catherine; Young, Cynthia (2011). True Crime: Florida: The State's Most Notorious Criminal Cases. Pennsylvania: Stackpole Books. ISBN 978-0-811-74439-3.
- Franscell, Ron (2011). Delivered from Evil: True Stories of Ordinary People who Faced Monstrous Mass Killers and Survived. Massacheussetts: Fair Winds Press. ISBN 978-1-592-33440-7.
- Lane, Brian; Gregg, Wilfred (1994). The Encyclopedia of Mass Murderers. Kent: Headline Book Publishing. ISBN 0-747-20897-2.
- Leyton, Elliot (2011) [1986]. Hunting Humans: The Rise Of The Modern Multiple Murderer. Toronto: McClelland & Stewart. ISBN 978-0-140-11687-8.
- Logan, Richard; Duperrault Fassbender, Tere Jo (2010). Alone: Orphaned on the Ocean. Wisconsin: Titletown Publishing. ISBN 978-0-982-72063-9.
