= Edmond Castel =

French actor (1886–1947)

Edmond Castel, real name Edmond Castellino, (26 March 1886, Alès – 1 November 1947, Neuilly-sur-Seine) was a French actor.

== Filmography ==
- 1927: Parisian Pleasures a silent film by Joe Francis
- 1930: Ce qu'on dit, ce qu'on pense - short film, anonymous
- 1931: A Father Without Knowing It by Robert Wyler
- 1931: Amour et business by Robert Péguy - short film
- 1932: To the Polls, Citizens by Jean Hémard
- 1932: That Scoundrel Morin by Georges Lacombe
- 1932: Mirages de Paris by Fedor Ozep
- 1932: Bouillabaisse by Roger Lion - short film
- 1933: In the Land of the Sun by Robert Péguy
- 1933: Les Misérables by Raymond Bernard - film shot in three periods
- 1935: Arènes joyeuses by Karl Anton
- 1935: Le Collier du grand duc / Le parapluie de Monsieur Bec by Robert Péguy
- 1935: Monsieur Prosper by Robert Péguy
- 1936: Bach the Detective by René Pujol
- 1936: Les Croquignolle by Robert Péguy
- 1937: The Lafarge Case by Pierre Chenal
- 1937: Nuits de princes by Wladimir Strijewski
- 1938: La Marseillaise by Jean Renoir
- 1938: Adrienne Lecouvreur by Marcel L'Herbier as Folard
- 1939: L'Esclave blanche by Marc Sorkin
- 1939: Sérénade by Jean Boyer
- 1940: Ils étaient cinq permissionnaires by Pierre Caron
- 1941: Le soleil a toujours raison by Pierre Billon
- 1942: Love Marriage by Henri Decoin
- 1942: Simplet by Fernandel
- 1943: Après l'orage by Pierre-Jean Ducis
- 1946: Land Without Stars by Georges Lacombe
