= Michel Duran =

French actor, author, dialoguist and screenwriter

- Born: Michel Joseph Durand; 22 April 1900; Lyon
- Died: 18 February 1994 (aged 93); Rambouillet

Michel Duran, pen name of Michel Joseph Durand (22 April 1900, in Lyon – 18 February 1994, in Rambouillet) was a French actor, author, dialoguist and screenwriter. He was the son of Michel Jacques Durand and Marie Exbrayat.

On 14 June 1940 he married Marie Thérèse Henriette Théodora Besnard, granddaughter of the painter Albert Besnard but they had no child.

== Television ==
- 1964: Pierrots des alouettes, televised musical comedy by Henri Spade (screenwriter)
- 1968: Au théâtre ce soir : Boléro, mise-en-scène Alfred Pasquali, directed by Pierre Sabbagh, Théâtre Marigny
- 1969: Au théâtre ce soir : La mariée est trop belle by Michel Duran, mise-en-scène Jacques Mauclair, directed by Pierre Sabbagh, Théâtre Marigny
- 1972: Au théâtre ce soir : Faites-moi confiance, mise-en-scène Alfred Pasquali] directed by Pierre Sabbagh, Théâtre Marigny
- 1977: Au théâtre ce soir : Bonne Chance Denis, mise-en-scène Claude Nicot, directed by Pierre Sabbagh, Théâtre Marigny

== Cinema ==
- 1922: La Femme de nulle part by Louis Delluc (a young man)
- 1924: La Galerie des monstres by Jaque Catelain (actor)
- 1931: Amours viennoises by Jean Choux and Robert Land
- 1933: Paris-Soleil by Jean Hémard (screenwriter and dialoguist under the pseudonym Michel Mourguet)
- 1934: Mauvaise Graine by Billy Wilder and Alexander Esway (actor : the lieder)
- 1934: Le Bonheur by Marcel L'Herbier (dialoguist)
- 1937: Alexis, Gentleman Chauffeur by Max de Vaucorbeil (actor : Dornach)
- 1938: Beautiful Star by Jacques de Baroncelli (screenwriter and dialoguist)
- 1938: S.O.S. Sahara by Jacques de Baroncelli (dialogue and adaptation)
- 1939: Fric-Frac by Claude Autant-Lara and Maurice Lehmann (screenwriter)
- 1939: Le Grand Élan by Christian-Jaque (dialoguist)
- 1940: Beating Heart by Henri Decoin (dialoguist)
- 1941: Sins of Youth by Maurice Tourneur (screenwriter)
- 1941: Premier rendez-vous by Henri Decoin (screenwriter)
- 1942: Prince Charming by Jean Boyer (screenwriter)
- 1942: Twisted Mistress by André Cayatte (actor and dialoguist)
- 1944: Cécile est morte by Maurice Tourneur (dialoguist)
- 1945: False Alarm by Jacques de Baroncelli (screenwriter)
- 1945: The Last Metro by Maurice de Canonge (dialoguist)
- 1946: The Ideal Couple by Bernard Roland and Raymond Rouleau (dialoguist)
- 1946: We Are Not Married by Bernard Roland (screenwriter)
- 1946: Madame et son flirt by Jean de Marguenat (dialoguist)
- 1947: Are You Sure? de Jacques Houssin (dialoguist)
- 1948: Les Aventures des Pieds-Nickelés by Marcel Aboulker (screenwriter)
- 1952: Allô je t'aime by André Berthomieu (dialoguist)
- 1953: Feather in the Wind by Louis Cuny (dialoguist)
- 1959: Mon pote le gitan by François Gir (dialoguist)
- 1964: Male Hunt by Édouard Molinaro (screenwriter)

== Theatre ==
=== Author ===
- 1931: Amitié under the name Michel Mourguet, directed by Raymond Rouleau, Théâtre du Marais Bruxelles
- 1932: Amitié under the name Michel Mourguet, directed by Raymond Rouleau, Théâtre des Nouveautés, Théâtre Saint-Georges
- 1934: Liberté provisoire, directed by Jacques Baumer, Théâtre Saint-Georges
- 1936: Trois...Six...Neuf..., directed by Jean Wall, Théâtre Michel
- 1938: Barbara, Théâtre Saint-Georges
- 1939: Nous ne sommes pas mariés, Théâtre des Bouffes-Parisiens
- 1940: Nous ne sommes pas mariés, Théâtre Saint-Georges, Théâtre de Paris
- 1941: Boléro, directed by Alfred Pasquali, Théâtre des Bouffes-Parisiens
- 1942: Trois...Six...Neuf..., directed by Roland Armontel, Théâtre de Paris
- 1946: Bonne Chance Denis, directed by Raymond Rouleau, Théâtre de l'Œuvre
- 1947: Liberté provisoire, Théâtre Sarah Bernhardt
- 1947: Boléro, Théâtre Édouard VII
- 1948: Premier Rendez-vous operetta written with Henri Decoin, music René Sylviano, premiered in Nancy 22 December 1948, then at Gaîté Lyrique
- 1949: Sincèrement, directed by Alice Cocéa, Théâtre des Capucines
- 1950: La mariée est trop belle,
- 1952: Sincèrement, directed by Alice Cocéa, Théâtre de l’Ambigu
- 1953: Faites-moi confiance, directed by Jean Meyer, Théâtre du Gymnase
- 1954: La Roulotte, Théâtre Michel
- 1955 : José, Théâtre des Nouveautés
- [1957 : Mon cœur balance, directed by Alice Cocéa, Casino municipal de Nice, Théâtre des Arts

=== Comedian ===
- 1924: Chacun sa vérité and Un imbécile by Luigi Pirandello, directed by Charles Dullin, Théâtre de l'Atelier
- 1925: La Femme silencieuse by Ben Jonson, directed by Charles Dullin, Théâtre de l'Atelier
- 1926: La Comédie du bonheur by Nikolai Evreinov, directed by Charles Dullin, Théâtre de l'Atelier
- 1930: Patchouli by Armand Salacrou, directed by Charles Dullin, Théâtre de l'Atelier
- 1934: Liberté provisoire by Michel Duran, directed by Jacques Baumer, Théâtre Saint-Georges
- 1954: La Roulotte by Michel Duran, directed by Alfred Pasquali, Théâtre Michel
- 1955: L’Amour fou ou la première surprise by André Roussin, directed by the author, Théâtre de la Madeleine
