= The Path to Happiness =

1934 film

- Directed by: Jean Mamy
- Written by: Michel Duran
- Produced by: Pierre Mathieu
- Starring: Alfred Pizella; Michel Duran; Clément Doucet
- Cinematography: Boris Kaufman
- Music by: René Sylviano
- Production company: Films Pierre Mathieu
- Release date: 5 January 1934
- Running time: 102 minutes
- Country: France
- Language: French

The Path to Happiness (French: Le Chemin du bonheur) is a 1934 French comedy film directed by Jean Mamy and starring Alfred Pizella, Michel Duran and Clément Doucet. The film's sets were designed by the art director Maurice Guerbe.

== Synopsis ==
Three penniless friends, an aspiring singer, painter and film extra, retain their optimism for the future despite their current struggles. At last good fortune seems to smile on them.

== Cast ==
- Simone Alex as Lulu
- Alfred Pizella as Fred
- Yahla Salève as Simone
- Michel Duran as Claude
- Émile Riandreys as André
- Clément Doucet as Camille, le pianiste
- Jean Périer as M. Bargetin père
- Fernand Charpin
- Georges Térof
- Jean Boyer

== Bibliography ==
- Bessy, Maurice & Chirat, Raymond. Histoire du cinéma français: 1929-1934. Pygmalion, 1988.
- Crisp, Colin. Genre, Myth and Convention in the French Cinema, 1929-1939. Indiana University Press, 2002.
- Rège, Philippe. Encyclopedia of French Film Directors, Volume 1. Scarecrow Press, 2009.
