= The Deep (unfinished film) =

- Directed by: Orson Welles
- Screenplay by: Orson Welles
- Based on: Dead Calm by Charles Williams
- Produced by: Orson Welles
- Starring: Michael Bryant; Laurence Harvey; Oja Kodar; Jeanne Moreau; Orson Welles
- Cinematography: Willy Kurant; Ivica Rajkovic
- Language: English

The Deep is an unfinished film directed by Orson Welles, based on Charles Williams's novel Dead Calm (1963), which was later adapted as an eponymous 1989 film. Welles produced and wrote The Deep, as well as played the role of Russ Brewer opposite Jeanne Moreau and Laurence Harvey.

Welles worked on the film from 1966 to 1969. The film is incomplete; several major scenes were never shot, and portions of the soundtrack remain unrecorded. The original negative has been lost, and the film exists in two work prints, one in black and white and the other in color (the way the film was intended to be shown).

== Production ==
Welles intended the film to be a less personal, more commercially viable project than his past efforts, saying of The Deep: "My hope is that it won’t be an art-house movie. I hope it’s the kind of movie I enjoy seeing myself. I felt it was high time to show that we could make some money." Peter O'Toole recalls that he was approached by Welles to play the lead in the film and remembers The Deep as "a script that I thought was beautiful."

The film was shot off the coast of Yugoslavia between 1966 and 1969. It was photographed in color by Belgian cinematographer Willy Kurant, who also shot The Immortal Story for Welles.

The production was plagued by financial and technical problems. As work on the film became more sporadic and difficult, Welles became increasingly withdrawn. Amongst the unshot scenes was an explosion that would have formed the film's climax.

Although the production was deeply troubled, many of the people involved have spoken highly of the film, including lead Jeanne Moreau, who in 2000 looked back on the film as "a fantastic experience", noting that "the only disastrous thing was that later on, the film disappeared."

Welles struggled to finish the film after production effectively halted in 1969. He edited trailers and short scenes to help secure financing, and at one point contacted Charlton Heston about recording voice-over narration.

In 1973, lead actor Laurence Harvey died, effectively ending any hope for Welles of finishing the picture. The novel Dead Calm was eventually adapted to film in 1989 as Dead Calm starring Nicole Kidman, Sam Neill, and Billy Zane; it was directed by Phillip Noyce.

== Existing versions ==
Because the original negative has been lost, the only extant versions of the film are two work prints, one in color (as the film was meant to be shown), and the other in black and white. The Munich Film Museum later created a version using these elements.

Because production had never finished, the film never entered post-production, and therefore the surviving versions of the film feature no music, and they use rough audio which Welles planned on re-dubbing later. Welles even dubbed in some actors' lines himself while editing the film, and this can be heard in the current version. There are plans to "complete" the film using subtitles or intertitles to replace or explain the missing scenes.

Footage from The Deep is included in the documentary Orson Welles: One-Man Band (1995), which is included as a bonus feature on the DVD and Blu-ray releases of Welles's mockumentary F for Fake.
