= Dead Calm (film) =

1989 film by Phillip Noyce

- American theatrical release poster
- Directed by: Phillip Noyce
- Screenplay by: Terry Hayes
- Based on: Dead Calm by Charles Williams
- Produced by: Terry Hayes; George Miller; Doug Mitchell
- Starring: Sam Neill; Nicole Kidman; Billy Zane
- Cinematography: Dean Semler
- Edited by: Richard Francis-Bruce
- Music by: Graeme Revell
- Production company: Kennedy Miller
- Distributed by: Roadshow Films
- Release dates: 7 April 1989 (United States); 25 May 1989 (Australia)
- Running time: 95 minutes
- Country: Australia
- Language: English
- Budget: A$10 million
- Box office: A$10.2 million

Dead Calm is a 1989 Australian horror thriller film directed by Phillip Noyce and starring Sam Neill, Nicole Kidman, and Billy Zane. Adapted by screenwriter Terry Hayes from the 1963 novel of the same name by American writer Charles Williams, the plot focuses on a married couple, who come across a mysterious stranger abandoning a sinking ship while sailing in the Pacific Ocean.

Filmed around the Great Barrier Reef, Dead Calm was the first successful film adaptation of Williams's novel, after Orson Welles worked for a number of years to complete his own film based on it entitled The Deep, though it ultimately went unreleased and uncompleted.

Dead Calm was generally well received, with critics praising Neill, Kidman, and Zane's performances and the oceanic cinematography. It was nominated in eight categories at the 1989 Australian Film Institute Awards, including Best Film, and won four. Modern retrospective analyses have been favourable, with The New York Times naming it one of the 1000 best films ever made.

== Plot ==
Rae Ingram is traumatised after a car crash results in the death of her young son. Her older husband, Royal Australian Navy Captain John Ingram, suggests a vacation on their yacht, the Saracen. In the middle of the Pacific Ocean, they encounter a drifting schooner that appears to be taking on water. A distressed man rows a dinghy over to the Saracen. He introduces himself as Hughie Warriner and tells them the schooner is sinking, the other passengers having died of food poisoning ten days prior.

While Hughie sleeps, a suspicious John rows out to the schooner, the Orpheus. In the partially-flooded hold, he is horrified to discover the mutilated corpses of the other passengers and rushes back towards the Saracen. However, Hughie awakens and sails the yacht away, knocking Rae out when she tries to stop him.

Returning to the Orpheus, John manages to pump enough water out of the hold to restart the engine and begin pursuing the Saracen. He also discovers video footage showing Hughie's increasingly unhinged behaviour towards his fellow passengers, culminating in their murders. Rae awakens, and after a confrontation in which Hughie displays extreme paranoia and mood swings, she starts working to gain his trust. John manages to hail Rae on the radio, but water damage makes him unable to reply except through clicks on the receiver to signal yes or no to her questions. He tells her the Orpheus is beyond salvaging and will sink within hours, before his radio dies completely.

To save John, Rae plays along with Hughie's overtures, which gradually turn sexual. As they start to kiss and undress, Rae excuses herself to the bathroom. She runs on deck to assemble the yacht's shotgun, but her dog Ben follows and starts barking, causing Hughie to investigate. Unable to stall further, Rae leaves the gun behind and is raped by Hughie.

Afterwards, Rae spikes some lemonade with a heavy dose of her prescription sedatives and tricks Hughie into drinking it. Claiming she is going to get dressed, Rae returns for the shotgun, but Hughie catches her and they fight as a squall hits the yacht. Hughie wrestles the shotgun away, but the sedative disorients him and he shoots the Saracen's radio. Finding a harpoon launcher, Rae locks herself in the bedroom and fires through the door, accidentally killing Ben. Hughie breaks in and begins to strangle her before the sedatives finally take effect and he passes out. Rae ties him up and begins sailing back to John. After reviving, Hughie cuts himself loose and comes after Rae, who shoots him in the shoulder with a harpoon and beats him unconscious. She sets him adrift in the yacht's life raft.

Damaged further by the squall, the Orpheus floods as a collapsed mast traps John below deck. He breaks free by kicking through the hull and sets the wreckage on fire. At dusk, Rae catches sight of the flames and finds John on a piece of floating debris, pulling him back onto the Saracen before they tearfully embrace. The next morning they encounter the life raft, which is empty; Rae destroys it with a flare.

The following day, Rae is washing her hair on deck while John is below preparing breakfast, when a gravely injured Hughie appears and attacks Rae. Coming upon the scene, John grabs a flare and fires it into Hughie's mouth, killing him.

== Cast ==
- Nicole Kidman as Rae Ingram
- Sam Neill as John Ingram
- Billy Zane as Hughie Warriner
- Rod Mullinar as Russell Bellows
- Joshua Tilden as Danny
- George Shevtsov as Doctor
- Michael Long as Specialist Doctor
- Lisa Collins as 'Orpheus' Cruise Girl
- Paula Hudson-Brinkley as 'Orpheus' Cruise Girl
- Sharon Cook as 'Orpheus' Cruise Girl
- Malinda Rutter as 'Orpheus' Cruise Girl
- Benji as Dog (as Benji U.D. A.D.)
- John Simmit as Dog Owner (uncredited)

== Unfinished previous adaptation ==
The film is based on the novel Dead Calm by American author Charles Williams. Orson Welles had optioned the film rights in the mid-1960's. Under the title The Deep, Welles shot the film between 1966 and 1969 off the coast of Yugoslavia. The prospective film starred Laurence Harvey as Hughie, Michael Bryant as Ingram, Oja Kodar as Rae, and Welles himself played Russ Bellowes. Jeanne Moreau played Hughie's wife Ruth, a character present in the original novel but cut out of Noyce's film.

Welles' production was plagued by financial and technical problems, and effectively halted at the end of 1969. Principal photography remained incomplete, and Laurence Harvey's death in 1973 effectively ended any hope of completing the film. The original film negative is considered lost, though two workprints survive, and footage from the film has been displayed since.

== Production ==
Producer Tony Bill had tried to buy the rights from Welles but was never successful. He mentioned this to Philip Noyce, giving him a copy of the book in 1984. Noyce enjoyed the book and showed it to George Miller and Terry Hayes, who were enthusiastic. Miller managed to persuade Oja Kodar, Welles's companion, who controlled the rights to the novel, to sell the book to Kennedy Miller.

The book features several other main characters (including Hughie's wife and survivors John finds on the Orpheus), and presented Hughie as a nominally asexual manchild. It also goes into further detail about what caused Hughie's psychotic break.

=== Filming ===
The film was shot over a six-month span in Queensland's Whitsunday Islands beginning in May 1987. George Miller directed some sequences himself, including one where Sam Neill's character is tormented in the boat by a shark. This scene ended up being dropped from the final cut of the film.

The sequence in which John kills Hughie with a flare was filmed at the request of Warner Bros. Pictures seven months after principal photography finished. As written, the film originally ended with Rae setting Hughie adrift on a life raft, probably to die at sea; the studio was unhappy with this ambiguity and wanted a definite fate for the film's antagonist.

Sam Neill met his future wife Noriko Watanabe during filming.

=== Music ===
The synthesiser-driven film score was composed and performed by New Zealand musician Graeme Revell, of the industrial group SPK. Dead Calm was Revell's first ever film score, and earned him an AFI Award for Best Original Music Score.

== Release ==
Dead Calm was released theatrically in the United States and Canada on 7 April 1989 by Warner Bros. Pictures. The film had its Australian release the following month on 25 May 1989, distributed by Roadshow Films.

== Reception ==
=== Box office ===
Dead Calm opened at number six at the United States box office, earning $2,463,551 during its opening weekend at 959 venues. It went on to gross a total of $7,825,009 in the United States. In Australia, the film earned $2,444,407.

=== Critical response ===
Dead Calm has an 84% "fresh" rating at Rotten Tomatoes based on 31 reviews, with a rating of 7.5/10. The site's consensus states that "Nicole Kidman's coiled intensity and muscular direction by Phillip Noyce give this nautical thriller a disquieting sense of dread". On Metacritic, the film has a weighted average score of 70 out of 100, based on 16 critics, indicating "generally favorable reviews". Audiences polled by CinemaScore gave the film an average grade of "B" on an A+ to F scale.

According to David Stratton of Variety, "throughout the film, Nicole Kidman is excellent" and "she gives the character of Rae real tenacity and energy" and "though not always entirely credible" the picture "is a nail-biting suspense pic, handsomely produced and inventively directed." Roger Ebert of the Chicago Sun-Times wrote that the film "generates genuine tension because the story is so simple and the performances are so straightforward. This is not a gimmick film (unless you count the husband's method of escaping from the sinking ship), and Kidman and Zane do generate real, palpable hatred in their scenes together." Desson Howe of The Washington Post praised the film's creators: "Noyce's direction moves impressively from sensual tenderness (between husband and wife) to edge-of-the-seat horror. With accomplished editing by Richard Francis-Bruce and scoring by Graeme Revell, he finds lurking dangers in quiet, peaceful waters."

On the other hand, Caryn James of The New York Times felt that the film was "an unsettling hybrid of escapist suspense and the kind of pure trash that depends on dead babies and murdered dogs for effect," and that Dead Calm "becomes disturbing for all the wrong reasons." A number of critics faulted the film's ending as being over-the-top, with the Post's Howe writing, "... while it's afloat, 'Dead Calm' is a majestic horror cruise. ... For much of the movie, you're enthralled. By the end, you're laughing."

The acting was generally considered excellent, with Zane being cited for injecting "unforgettable humanity and evil puckishness into his role" and being "suitably manic and evil." And while Rita Kempley of The Washington Post wrote "what's most fascinating about it is Rae's place in the pantheon of heroines, an Amazon for the '90s," the Times' James called Kidman's character "tough but stupid."

The film is listed on The New York Times Top 1000 Movies list, derived from editor Peter M. Nichols' The New York Times Guide to the Best 1,000 Movies Ever Made. The film was partly the inspiration for 1993 Hindi-language film Darr.

=== Accolades ===
Award/association	Year	Category	Nominee(s)	Result	Ref.
Australian Film Institute Awards	1989	Best Film	George Miller	Nominated	
Australian Film Institute Awards	1989	Best Direction	Phillip Noyce	Nominated	
Australian Film Institute Awards	1989	Best Screenplay, Adapted	Terry Hayes	Nominated	
Australian Film Institute Awards	1989	Best Original Music Score	Graeme Revell	Won	
Australian Film Institute Awards	1989	Best Cinematography	Dean Semler	Won	
Australian Film Institute Awards	1989	Best Editing	Richard Francis-Bruce	Won	
Australian Film Institute Awards	1989	Best Sound	Ben Osmo, Lee Smith, Roger Savage	Won	
Australian Film Institute Awards	1989	Best Production Design	Graham Grace Walker	Nominated	
Chicago Film Critics Association Award	1990	Most Promising Actor	Billy Zane	Nominated	
Motion Picture Sound Editors Award	1990	Best Sound Editing - Foreign Feature	Ben Osmo, Lee Smith, Roger Savage	Won	
Saturn Awards	1991	Best Actress	Nicole Kidman	Nominated	

== See also ==
- The Deep (unfinished film)
- Cinema of Australia
