= Love Marriage (1942 film) =

1942 film

- Directed by: Henri Decoin
- Written by: Henri Decoin; Jean Lec; Marcel Rivet
- Produced by: Alfred Greven
- Starring: Juliette Faber; François Périer; Paul Meurisse
- Cinematography: Jules Kruger
- Edited by: Charlotte Guilbert
- Music by: René Sylviano
- Production company: Continental Films
- Distributed by: Films Sonores Tobis
- Release date: 23 December 1942
- Running time: 82 minutes
- Country: France
- Language: French

Love Marriage (French: Mariage d'amour) is a 1942 French comedy film directed by Henri Decoin and starring Juliette Faber, François Périer and Paul Meurisse. It was produced by the German-controlled Continental Films during the occupation of France. It was shot at the Neuilly Studios in Paris. The film's sets were designed by the art director Guy de Gastyne.

== Cast ==
- Juliette Faber as Denise
- François Périer as Pierre
- Paul Meurisse as Robert
- Georges Rollin as Bernard
- Henri Vilbert as Amédée
- Michel Vitold as Le fou du sixième
- André Gabriello as Loustalec
- Odette Barencey as L'habilleuse
- Paul Barge as Un agent du commissariat
- Georges Bever as Le chauffeur
- Lucien Bryonne as Le brigadier
- Edmond Castel as Un camionneur
- Henri Charrett as Le joueur de belote
- Françoise Christophe as La secrétaire
- Henri de Livry as La marié de l'Atlanta
- Solange Delporte as La jeune mariée
- Germain Denis-Barreiro as Un marié
- Jacques Denoël as Le jeune marié
- Pierre Ferval as Un camionneur
- Fernand Flament as Un agent
- Louis Florencie as Le commissaire
- Robert Le Ray as Un agent au banquet
- Charlotte Lysès as La dame vieille-France
- Aman Maistre Julien as Le speaker
- Albert Malbert as Le facteur
- Raymond Piesset as Un agent au banquet
- Henry Prestat as Le directeur de l'Atlanta
- Roger Prosmer as L'agent du poste de police
- Micheline Prévost as Le mannequin
- Georges Péclet as Le portier de l'Atlanta
- Janine Viénot as Janine
- Jeanne Véniat as La concierge

== Bibliography ==
- Bessy, Maurice & Chirat, Raymond. Histoire du cinéma français: encyclopédie des films, 1940–1950. Pygmalion, 1986.
- Leteux, Christine. Continental Films: French Cinema under German Control. University of Wisconsin Press, 2022.
- Rège, Philippe. Encyclopedia of French Film Directors, Volume 1. Scarecrow Press, 2009.
