= Oja Kodar =

Croatian actress and filmmaker (born 1941)

- Born: Olga Palinkaš; 1941 (age 84–85); Zagreb, Banovina of Croatia, Kingdom of Yugoslavia
- Occupations: Actress; screenwriter; film director
- Years active: 1961–present
- Partner: Orson Welles (1966–1985)

Oja Kodar (/ˈɔɪ.ə ˈkoʊdɑːr/ OY-ə KOH-dar; born Olga Palinkaš; 1941) is a Croatian actress, screenwriter and director known as Orson Welles's romantic partner and collaborator during the later years of his life.

== Personal life ==
Olga Palinkaš (spelled in Hungarian Pálinkás) was born in Zagreb to a Hungarian father and a Croatian mother. She met Welles in 1961 in Zagreb, Croatia, Yugoslavia, when Welles was on location shooting The Trial, released the following year. Welles, married to his third wife Paola Mori, took a liking to the "dark, beautiful and exotic-looking" Palinkaš. Soon after their romance began, Welles gave her a stage name, Oja Kodar, which is a mixture of the nickname "Oja", used by her sister Nina, and the Croatian expression "k'o dar" ("as a present").

In his final years, Welles divided his time between a Las Vegas home he shared with Mori and a Hollywood house with Kodar. The Italian press broke the news of Welles's affair with Kodar in March 1970, though Mori apparently remained unaware of it for several years.

Mori died 10 months after Welles, leaving the final settlement of his estate to Kodar and Beatrice Welles, Mori and Welles's daughter, on November 7, 1986.

== Cinematic career ==
In the early 1960s, Welles began, as a project, The Other Side of the Wind.

Most of Kodar's cinematic career revolved around Welles's projects, many of which were never completed.

In 1966, five years after they met, the couple returned to the Yugoslav coast, where Welles began shooting The Deep based on Charles Williams's 1963 novel Dead Calm with Kodar playing one of the main roles. Welles envisioned the film as a commercial project, designed to do well at the box-office; however, the production ran into financial and technical difficulties and was not completed. Decades later, Kodar blamed it on an unwillingness by jealous co-star Jeanne Moreau to dub her lines, while editor Mauro Bonanni claimed Welles abandoned The Deep when he realized the novice Kodar was ill-suited for the lead role.

Kodar (uncredited) co-wrote and appeared as herself in Welles's free-form documentary F for Fake (1973), which initially received mixed reviews but grew in stature in the years since, owing to its groundbreaking editing techniques.

In 1980, Kodar collaborated on a script for Welles's film The Dreamers based on Karen Blixen's stories. Test scenes with Kodar in the main role were shot in 1982, but Welles never obtained backing for the film. The Munich Filmmuseum has edited the black-and-white and color footage into a short film.

Three months after Welles died in October 1985, Kodar sold her book rights to Dead Calm for $180,000 to Australian producer George Miller for a 1989 film of the same name; however, the deal nearly went sour until producers informed Kodar they would hold her liable for damages.

Kodar made her debut as a feature film director with the release of Jaded (1989). The film was produced by Kodar and Gary Graver (one of the cameramen on F for Fake), who doubled as the director of photography. The film starred Randall Brady, Elizabeth Brooks, Scott Kaske, Jillian Kesner, Kelli Maroney, and Kodar. Portions of the film were shot in an artist's loft in downtown Los Angeles.

Kodar supervised Jess Franco's assemblage of unedited footage of Welles's Don Quixote, which was released in 1992 to generally poor reviews.

Kodar's second feature film as a director was the war drama Vrijeme za... (1993), whose plot is set during the 1991–95 war in Croatia. The film was co-produced by the state-owned Croatian production house Jadran Film and the Italian state television channel Rai Tre, along with the Italian production house Ellepi Films.

== The Other Side of the Wind ==
Welles began shooting The Other Side of the Wind in 1970. Kodar says she co-wrote the screenplay with Welles, though it dates back to the early 1960s as a project Welles first conceived with Keith Baxter and Anthony Perkins in key roles. With a plot revolving around an aging film director's 70th birthday party, the film was conceptualized as a cynical portrait of 1970s Hollywood—parodying the end of the studio system, and the experimental new filmmakers of the New Hollywood, as well as mocking various European directors. The shooting, featuring Kodar as an actress referred to as 'the Indian' or 'Pocahontas', seemed to drag on for years and was not completed in Welles's lifetime. It was not released until 2018 after its editing was completed. Financiers of the film were located in Iran; and the film's negative reels were located in a Paris vault. An imbroglio between the financiers and other parties kept Welles from ever fully possessing the film, thus Welles was never able to complete the extensive editing of the film during his lifetime.

She later co-directed and co-wrote the German-French documentary Orson Welles: The One-Man Band (1995). For this film, she supervised a compilation of unused footage shot by Welles over the final 20 years of his career. Kodar is interviewed in Los Angeles and in Orvilliers, France, where they shared a house. This documentary is included on The Criterion Collection DVD release of F For Fake. The documentary goes into details about the three unfinished films on which Kodar and Welles worked together. The Other Side of the Wind was largely completed, and according to media reports in April 2007 was planned for release in 2008. The other films were never completed for reasons explained in the documentary.

In April 2015, Josh Karp's book Orson Welles's Last Movie: The Making of The Other Side of the Wind painted an unflattering portrait of Kodar as numerous individuals (investors, attorneys, executives and others) who have been involved with the unfinished film (it was finally completed and released in 2018) since 1999 all told a variation on the same tale in which Kodar derailed attempts to complete the film by reneging on agreements, pitting investors against each other, secretly shopping for better deals, and shifting her allegiances at critical junctures. Kodar's actions prompted an attorney for the Boushehri family, a co-owner of the film, to write in a 2007 memo: "We have been waiting for many years for her to agree to a deal ... My own personal feeling is that she is incapable of making a deal with anyone... Our client has never been the problem. Kodar has been."

Directors Peter Bogdanovich and Henry Jaglom and author Joseph McBride—all onscreen participants in The Other Side of the Wind—have confirmed that Kodar had at various points derailed attempts to complete the movie.

A plan to complete The Other Side of the Wind by producers Filip Jan Rymsza and Frank Marshall was agreed to by Kodar in October 2014 but later fell apart as Kodar and producers renegotiated conditions of the deal. She finally signed an agreement with Rymsza, Marshall and Netflix to complete the movie in February 2017. A month later, The Other Side of the Wind negative was flown from France to Los Angeles for editing and a planned release in 2018.

Kodar viewed a rough cut of the film in early 2018 and suggested changes, particularly to the film-within-a-film sequences, according to editor Bob Murawski. "She mostly felt we should play the film-within-the-film scenes much longer and there are scenes we put back in and debated," he said. "She was very supportive and surprisingly did not have a lot of notes."

She expressed some ambivalence about the completion in a July 2018 interview. "For some time, I thought it would be good to make a feature length documentary about all the problems struck by The Other Side of the Wind, but now I’m on the fence; maybe it’s better that the film has been made."

Kodar was unable to attend the Venice Film Festival premiere owing to health issues and family matters. A letter she sent to Rymsza was read, and it stated in part: "From everything I heard up to now, you, Frank (Marshall) and Peter (Bogdanovich) did a great job and I thank you all."
