= Paris-Soleil =

1933 film

- Directed by: Jean Hémard
- Written by: Michel Duran
- Produced by: Félix Méric
- Starring: Alfred Pizella; Claude Dauphin; Janine Guise
- Cinematography: René Gaveau
- Music by: Claude Pingault; René Sylviano
- Production company: Films Félix Méric
- Release date: 15 February 1933
- Running time: 85 minutes
- Country: France
- Language: French

Paris-Soleil is a 1933 French comedy film directed by Jean Hémard and starring Alfred Pizella, Claude Dauphin and Janine Guise.

== Synopsis ==
In Paris two friends, a journalist and a cabaret singer, fall in love with the niece of a florist. A series of complications ensue including a beauty contest, a female film star and a trip to Provence where everything is resolved.

== Cast ==
- Alfred Pizella as Félix
- Claude Dauphin as Fernand
- Janine Guise as Lucy Dormoy
- Jane Marny as Suzette
- Alida Rouffe as La tante Maria
- Marcel Simon as Lorrière
- Fortuné as Justin Garitte
- Paulette Dubost

== Bibliography ==
- Bessy, Maurice & Chirat, Raymond. Histoire du cinéma français: 1929–1934. Pygmalion, 1988.
- Crisp, Colin. Genre, Myth and Convention in the French Cinema, 1929–1939. Indiana University Press, 2002.
- Rège, Philippe. Encyclopedia of French Film Directors, Volume 1. Scarecrow Press, 2009.
