= At the Grand Balcony =

1949 film

- Film poster
- Directed by: Henri Decoin
- Written by: Joseph Kessel; Marcel Rivet
- Produced by: Raymond Borderie
- Starring: Pierre Fresnay; Georges Marchal; Félix Oudart
- Cinematography: Nicolas Hayer
- Edited by: Annick Millet
- Music by: Joseph Kosma
- Production company: Compagnie Industrielle et Commerciale Cinématographique
- Distributed by: Les Films Corona
- Release date: 30 November 1949
- Running time: 123 minutes
- Country: France
- Language: French

At the Grand Balcony (French: Au grand balcon) is a 1949 French drama film directed by Henri Decoin and starring Pierre Fresnay, Georges Marchal and Félix Oudart. It was entered into the 1949 Cannes Film Festival. The film's sets were designed by the art director René Renoux.

== Synopsis ==
The plot revolves around the founding of the French pioneering aviation company Aéropostale in the years after the First World War. Led by the war veteran Carbot they attempt to establish a commercial airline that can connect the far reaches of French territory. It takes its name from the real-life Hôtel du Grand Balcon in Toulouse where the various characters stay.

== Cast ==
- Pierre Fresnay as Carbot
- Georges Marchal as Jean Fabien
- Félix Oudart as Garandoux
- Janine Crispin as Maryse
- Germaine Michel as Mlle Adeline
- Abel Jacquin as Darbouin
- André Bervil as Triolet
- Clément Thierry as Didier Fusain
- Paul Azaïs as Morel
- Jacques Tarride as Macherel
- Nina Myral as Mme Viard
- André Darnay as Armezac
- Pierre Cressoy as Charlier
- Jean Gaven as Belfort

== Bibliography ==
- Dayna Oscherwitz & MaryEllen Higgins. The A to Z of French Cinema. Scarecrow Press, 2009.
