= The Dreamers (unfinished film) =

Unfinished film by Orson Welles

The Dreamers is an unfinished film project directed and produced between 1980 and 1982 by Orson Welles. Adapted from Karen Blixen stories, Welles co-wrote a script with his companion Oja Kodar and filmed a few scenes but was unable to complete the film due to financing problems.

== Production history ==
In 1979, Welles and Oja Kodar, the Croatian actress and writer who was Welles' companion in his later years, collaborated on a screenplay based on two stories from Karen Blixen, The Dreamers and Echoes. Henry Jaglom, the U.S. filmmaker who directed Welles in the 1971 feature A Safe Place, made inquiries to potential investors to back this project, which was originally called Da Capo. Northstar Productions, a company created by filmmaker Hal Ashby, provided Welles with funding to complete the script, but declined to pursue the project after reading the completed script.

Welles shot 20 minutes of 35mm footage based on the screenplay, using his Hollywood home as the set for the film.

It remains unclear whether Welles intended the footage to be used strictly as a test reel to pique the interest of potential investors, or whether Welles planned to complete production of the screenplay. Kodar has stated that Welles was prepared to go forward with a full production after the screenplay was rejected by the BBC and Miramax, but cinematographer Gary Graver, who shot the footage, has stated Welles never intended to self-finance the film and would not have gone further on the project without outside financing.

== The footage ==
The footage for The Dreamers consists of two segments running 10 minutes each. The first segment was shot in black-and-white and involves Welles in costume and make-up as a 19th-century Dutch-Jewish merchant who recounts the story of Pellegrina Leoni, an Italian opera diva who mysteriously disappeared after losing the ability to sing.

The second segment was shot in color and features Kodar as Pellegrina, who declares her farewell to her merchant friend while announcing that she is disappearing to seek a new anonymous life. Part of the Kodar footage was shot outdoors in the garden of Welles' home.

No other actors appear in the footage. Kodar would later recall Welles toying with the idea of casting Timothy Dalton, Peter Ustinov, Oliver Reed, Bud Cort, and Jeanne Moreau. However, Graver later stated that Welles was planning to use younger and lesser known British actors.

== Aftermath ==
Welles never acquired financial backing for this project and a full production of The Dreamers never came to fruition. The surviving footage is archived in Germany's Munich Filmmuseum, and it has been made public in several film festivals and retrospectives of Welles' work. Parts of the footage were included in the documentary Orson Welles: The One-Man Band and as a special feature on the Criterion DVD release of Welles' 1973 feature F for Fake.

In 1994, Peter Bogdanovich reportedly planned to make The Dreamers, but the production never came about. In 1996, the rights to the Blixen source material was purchased from Kodar by Andy Howard, who was Welles' business manager during the final years of his life. To date, Howard has not brought Welles' concept of The Dreamers to the screen.
