= To the Polls, Citizens =

1932 film

- Directed by: Jean Hémard
- Written by: Michel Bourdet; Jacques Bousquet
- Produced by: Félix Méric
- Starring: Léon Belières; Henri Poupon
- Cinematography: Jean Isnard; Armand Thirard
- Edited by: Jacques Desagneaux
- Music by: Michel Brusselmans; Marguerite Monnot; Vincent Scotto
- Production company: Films Félix Méric
- Release date: 11 March 1932
- Running time: 102 minutes
- Country: France
- Language: French

To the Polls, Citizens (French: Aux urnes, citoyens!) is a 1932 French comedy film directed by Jean Hémard and starring Léon Belières and Henri Poupon.

== Cast ==
- Léon Belières as Monsieur Dupont-Lebaigue
- Lily Mounet as Madame Dupont-Lebaigue
- Henri Poupon as Parpelet
- Rosine Deréan as Nicole
- Claude Dauphin as René Faradin
- Octave Berthier as Taponnier
- Jacques Bousquet as Monsieur Evrard
- Ginette Gaubert as Mado Farnèse
- Henri Jullien as L'huissier
- Edmond Castel as Le curé
- Jean Liézer as Le maire
- Suzy Winkler as Mariette
- Pierre Piérade as Un conseiller municipal
- Marcelle Monthil as Madame Grosbois
- Desaulnay as Armand de Brienne
- Maximilienne as La duchesse de Brienne
- Criscuolo as Le garagiste
- Félix Mayol as Le chanteur populaire
- Antonin Berval as Un électeur à voix

== Bibliography ==
- Crisp, Colin. Genre, Myth and Convention in the French Cinema, 1929-1939. Indiana University Press, 2002.
