= Stéphane Pizella =

French journalist and screenwriter

Stéphane Pizella (1909–1970) was a French journalist and screenwriter. He is sometimes confused with the actor Alfred Pizella.

== Selected filmography ==
- Make a Living (1931)
- The Island of Love (1944)
