= We Are Not Married =

1946 film

- Directed by: Bernard-Roland; Gianni Pons
- Written by: Michel Duran (play); Pierre Léaud
- Produced by: Bernard-Roland; Georges Sénamaud
- Starring: Louise Carletti; Claude Dauphin; Loris Gizzi
- Cinematography: Václav Vích
- Music by: Louis Gasté
- Production companies: Lutétia; Federcine
- Release date: 8 November 1946
- Running time: 80 minutes
- Countries: France; Italy
- Language: French

We Are Not Married (French: Nous ne sommes pas mariés) is a 1946 French-Italian comedy film directed by Bernard-Roland and Gianni Pons and starring Louise Carletti, Claude Dauphin and Loris Gizzi.

== Cast ==
- Louise Carletti as Simone
- Claude Dauphin as Fernand
- Loris Gizzi
- Robert Arnoux as Camille
- Liliane Bert as Evelyne
- Roland Toutain as Jimmy
- Corinne Calvet as Le modèle
- Nina Myral
- Philippe Olive as Dubois l'aîné

== Bibliography ==
- Rège, Philippe. Encyclopedia of French Film Directors, Volume 1. Scarecrow Press, 2009.
