= The Hot Spot =

1990 film by Dennis Hopper

- Theatrical release poster
- Directed by: Dennis Hopper
- Screenplay by: Charles Williams; Nona Tyson
- Based on: Hell Hath No Fury by Charles Williams
- Produced by: Paul Lewis
- Starring: Don Johnson; Virginia Madsen; Jennifer Connelly; Charles Martin Smith
- Cinematography: Ueli Steiger
- Edited by: Wende Phifer Mate
- Music by: Jack Nitzsche
- Distributed by: Orion Pictures
- Release dates: September 8, 1990 (TIFF); October 12, 1990 (United States)
- Running time: 130 minutes
- Country: United States
- Language: English
- Budget: $10 million
- Box office: $1.2 million

The Hot Spot is a 1990 American neo-noir romantic thriller film directed by Dennis Hopper, based on the 1953 novel Hell Hath No Fury by Charles Williams, who also co-wrote the screenplay. It stars Don Johnson, Virginia Madsen, and Jennifer Connelly, and features a score by Jack Nitzsche played by John Lee Hooker, Miles Davis, Taj Mahal, Roy Rogers, Tim Drummond, and drummer Earl Palmer.

== Plot ==
Drifter Harry Madox takes a job as a used car salesman in a small Texas town. In the summer heat, he develops an interest in Gloria Harper, a young demure woman who works at the car dealership in the loan office. He notices Gloria's legs, and her shoes which have wooden fruit on them. Dolly Harshaw, who is married to the dealership's owner, flirts shamelessly with Harry, telling him that she has a pair of shoes exactly like Gloria's. Soon after they begin a torrid affair.

Harry learns that the staff of the local bank are all volunteer firemen and that the cameras in the bank do not work. After careful planning, he sets a fire in a building across the street to lure them all away and while they are gone, he robs the bank. His conscience forces him to enter the burning building to save a homeless man trapped inside. Despite this the town's sheriff suspects Harry of committing the robbery and he is arrested. He learns the money is useless anyway as the serial numbers were recorded. Dolly gives him an alibi and tells him she will sell him out unless he kills her husband, whom she married for his money. When he refuses, Dolly threatens to expose him. She ultimately kills her husband herself by overstimulating his weak heart during a vigorous sexual encounter.

Meanwhile, Harry discovers that Gloria is being blackmailed by a local criminal named Frank Sutton. Sutton has nude photographs he took of Gloria and her best friend Irene Davey, after following them down by the local swimming hole, having heard tell of Irene being with another woman, who was her former teacher. Irene killed herself after being blackmailed and Harry, who has fallen in love with the 19-year-old Gloria, confronts Sutton to get the pictures. The tense conversation escalates into a fight, and Harry severely beats Sutton, but he defiantly continues to blackmail Gloria. Harry visits Sutton at his home and finds him having sex with a woman having wooden fruit shoes exactly like those belonging to Gloria. As Harry and Sutton begin fighting the unknown woman escapes, suffering an injury to her face. Harry ends up killing Sutton in the ensuing struggle. He plants the stolen money to divert suspicion away from himself, and disposes of the shoes, believing they belong to Gloria. He then tells the police that Sutton, who had no job and few assets, had recently paid cash for a new car, making it seem that Sutton had robbed the bank. The serial numbers tally and Harry receives the promise of a hefty reward for providing the tip that helps the police "solve" the robbery. He plans to marry Gloria and take her to the Caribbean Islands.

After being called over by the new business owner, Dolly, to the Harshaw house, Harry notices as they arrive that Gloria is wearing her wooden fruit shoes. Then Harry seeing the fresh scar on Dolly's face realizes that it was her and not Gloria who was having sex with Sutton. Before he can maneuver, Dolly ruins Harry's plans by showing him a copy of a certified letter she says she has entrusted to her attorney, to be opened in the event of her death. The letter is a firsthand account that will implicate him in the bank robbery, in Sutton's death, and records Gloria's embezzlement, information she had from Sutton. Dolly tells Gloria that Harry told her she was using company funds to pay off Sutton. Dolly then tells Gloria that she won't go to the police and that she can keep her job at the car dealership to pay back the money she stole. Believing she has been played for a fool, a heartbroken Gloria leaves Harry. Trapped, enraged, Harry tries to strangle Dolly, but cannot bring himself to kill her. Harry resigns himself to life with Dolly, and leaves town with her.

== Cast ==
- Don Johnson as Harry Madox
- Virginia Madsen as Dolly Harshaw
- Jennifer Connelly as Gloria Harper
- Debra Cole as Irene Davey
- Jerry Hardin as George Harshaw
- William Sadler as Frank Sutton
- Charles Martin Smith as Lon Gulick
- Barry Corbin as the Sheriff
- Leon Rippy as Deputy Tate
- Jack Nance as Julian Ward
- Virgil Frye as Deputy Buck

== Production ==
Charles Williams wrote a screenplay version of his own novel with Nona Tyson in 1962. It was intended for Robert Mitchum. Many years later, Dennis Hopper found the script and updated it. Hopper described the film as "Last Tango in Texas. Real hot, steamy stuff."

A bedroom scene originally called for Madsen to appear naked, but she decided to put on a negligee because she felt that, "Not only was the nudity weak storywise, but it didn't let the audience undress her". Hopper later admitted that Madsen was right.

Dennis Hopper gave his impressions of working with Johnson:

He wasn't that bad. He has a lot of people with him. He came on to this film with two bodyguards, a cook, a trainer, a helicopter pilot. He comes to and from the set in a helicopter, [has] two drivers, a secretary, and, his own hair person, his own make-up person, his own wardrobe person. So when he walks to the set he has five people with him.

Johnson found Hopper's approach to filmmaking "a little disappointing". He later recalled:

Mike Figgis had written a script called The Hot Spot, and it was a heist movie. Three days before we started shooting, Dennis Hopper came to all of us, he called a meeting on a Sunday, and he said, "Okay, we're not making that script. We're making this one." And he passed a script around the table that had been written for Robert Mitchum in the '60s... or maybe it was the '50s... and it was based on a book called Hell Hath No Fury. And that was the movie that we ended up making. This was three days before we started shooting! So he was kind of looking around the table at everybody and saying, "Well, you know, if Don Johnson bails, we don't have a movie." [Laughs.] And I read the script, and I said, "Wow!" I mean, the Figgis script was really slick and cool, and it was a heist movie, but this was real noir, the guy was an amoral drifter, and it was all about how women were going to take him down.

Hopper shot the film on location in Texas during what he described as the "hottest, steamiest weather you could imagine". The primary locations were in Taylor, especially its iconic downtown area, locations around and in Austin as well as in Luling. The swimming scenes were filmed at the Hamilton Pool Preserve west of Austin. In part of the skinny-dipping scene, Madsen was body doubled by Heather Cruikshank, who was working in a strip club when she was cast.

Johnson's wife, actress Melanie Griffith, gave birth to the couple's daughter, Dakota, in Austin during the film's shoot.

== Reception ==
The Hot Spot had its world premiere at the 1990 Toronto International Film Festival. Director Dennis Hopper felt that stars Don Johnson and Virginia Madsen were not as enthusiastic in promoting the film as he would have liked. Hopper said of Johnson that "He says he's not going to do anything for this picture until he reads the reviews." Johnson claims that he was unable to do promotion because he was shooting the film Harley Davidson and the Marlboro Man. Of Madsen, Hopper claimed that she "was very embarrassed" by the amount of her on-screen nudity. The film was released on October 12, 1990, in 23 theaters, grossing US$112,188 in its opening weekend. The film grossed only $1.2 million in the North American market, far less than the cost of its production.

The Hot Spot received generally positive reviews from critics. Rotten Tomatoes gives it a 69% rating at based on reviews from 29 critics. Metacritic, which uses a weighted average, assigned the film a score of 55 out of 100, based on 13 critics, indicating "mixed or average" reviews. Roger Ebert gave the film three out of four stars and wrote, "Only movie lovers who have marinated their imaginations in the great B movies from RKO and Republic will recognize The Hot Spot as a superior work in an old tradition." In her review for The New York Times, Janet Maslin wrote, "Mr. Hopper's direction is tough and stylish, in effective contrast with the sunny look of Ueli Steiger's cinematography." USA Today gave the film two-and-a-half stars out of four and wrote, "In other words, Hopper's direction isn't any great shakes, and the wrap-up is somewhat confusing, but this film does make you want to go skinny-dipping with someone else's mate." In his review for The Washington Post, Desson Howe wrote, "Hot Spot will never go down as timeless, neoclassic noir. But, with its Hopperlike moments, over-the-top performances and infectious music, it carries you along for a spell." Entertainment Weekly gave the film a "B" rating and Owen Gleiberman wrote, "Hopper still hasn't learned how to pace a movie, but working from Charles Williams' 1952 novel Hell Hath No Fury he comes up with a reasonably diverting hothouse yarn."

== Home media ==
In 1990, the movie premiered exclusively on Showtime.

On August 13, 2013, Shout! Factory released The Hot Spot on Blu-ray as part of a double feature along with Killing Me Softly. Kino Lorber re-released the film on Blu-ray on May 4, 2021 in a new 2k master, containing new interviews with Virginia Madsen and William Sadler, and an audio commentary from entertainment journalist Bryan Reesman.

== Soundtrack ==
The soundtrack for the film is composed by Jack Nitzsche and features an original collaboration between John Lee Hooker, Miles Davis, Taj Mahal, Tim Drummond, Earl Palmer, and Roy Rogers; Davis was nominated for the Grammy Award for Best Jazz Performance. Allmusic retrospectively described the soundtrack album as "marvelous music ... something listeners should be thankful for, particularly fans of either Miles Davis or John Lee Hooker".
