= Marcel Rivet =

- Born: 8 September 1905; Limoges, France
- Died: 27 October 1957 (aged 52); Paris, France
- Occupation: Writer
- Years active: 1942-1957 (film)

Marcel Rivet (1905–1957) was a French screenwriter.

== Selected filmography ==
- Love Marriage (1942)
- I Am with You (1943)
- Home Port (1943)
- Pétrus (1946)
- The Idol (1948)
- Five Red Tulips (1949)
- Portrait of an Assassin (1949)
- At the Grand Balcony (1949)
- Between Eleven and Midnight (1949)
- The Night Is My Kingdom (1951)
- Nightclub (1951)
- Operation Magali (1953)
- Three Sailors (1957)

== Bibliography ==
- Tim Palmer & Charlie Michael. Directory of World Cinema: France. Intellect Books, 2013.
