= Hamilton Pool Preserve =

Nature preserve near Austin, Texas

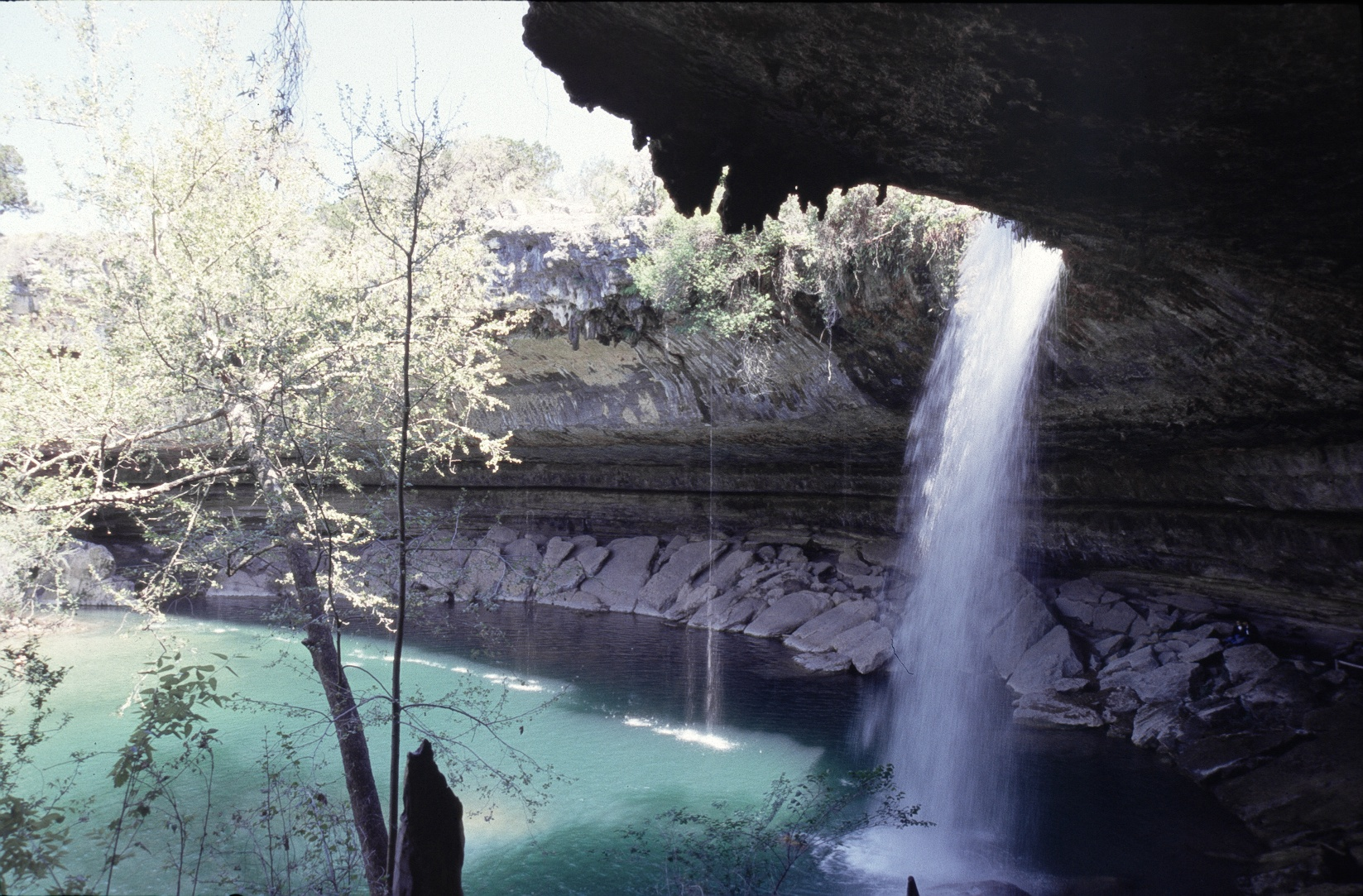
- Waterfall during high water
- Location: Travis County, Texas, U.S.
- Nearest city: Bee Cave, Texas
- Coordinates: 30.34227°N 98.12693°W
- Established: 1985
- Governing body: Travis County Parks

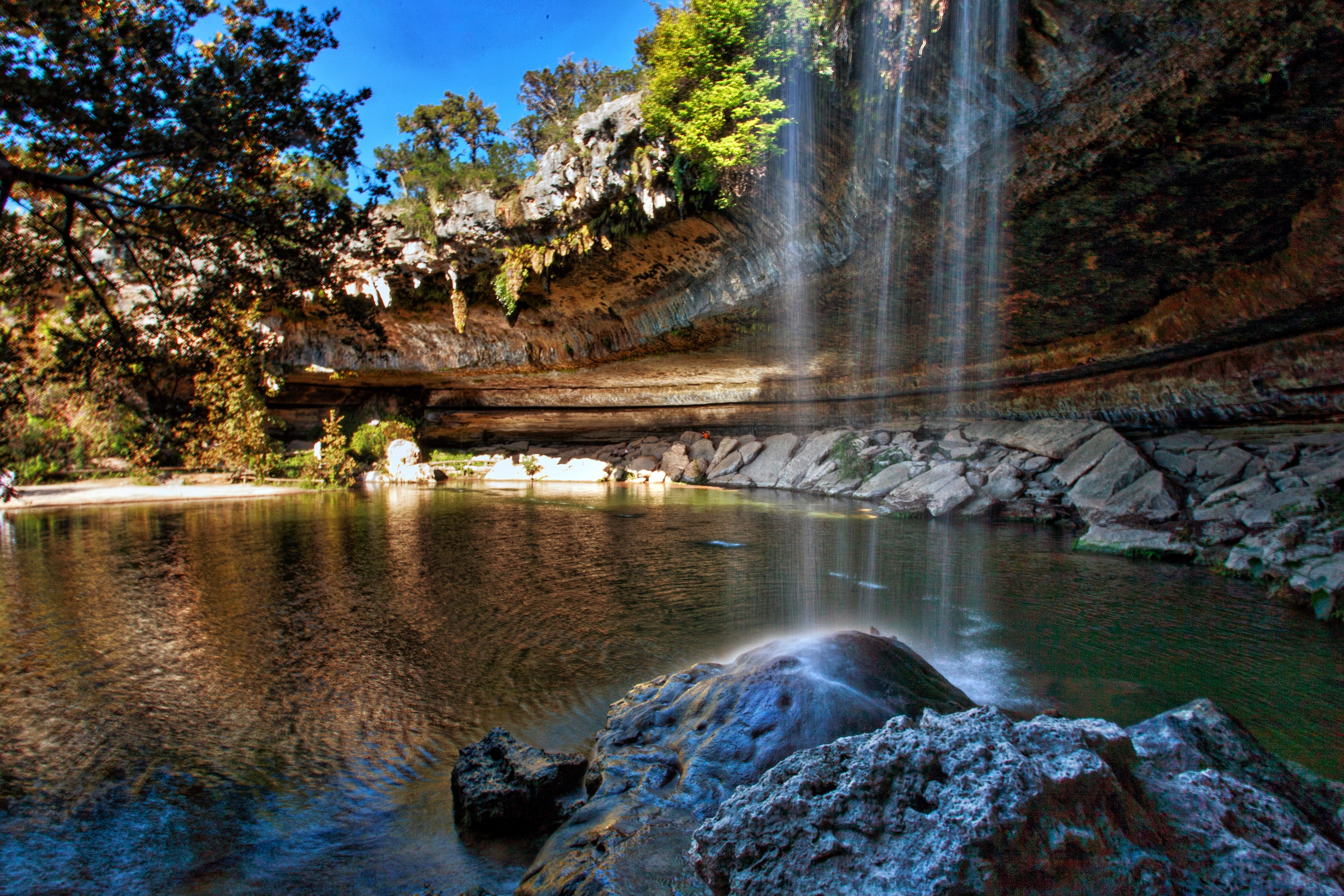
A waterfall flows freely into Hamilton Pool, which is surrounded by a collapsed grotto

Hamilton Pool Preserve is a recreational destination located in the Texas Hill Country west of Austin. Reservations are required to visit, and it is open for hiking and sight-seeing. Hamilton Pool is a natural pool that was created when the dome of an underground river collapsed due to massive erosion thousands of years ago. The pool is located about 23 miles (37 km) west of Austin, Texas off Highway 71. Since the 1960s, Hamilton Pool has been a popular summer swimming spot for Austin visitors and residents. Hamilton Pool Preserve consists of 232 acres (0.94 km^{2}) of protected natural habitat featuring a jade green pool into which a 50-foot (15 m) waterfall flows with water temperatures reaching 50 degrees Fahrenheit.

The pool is surrounded by large slabs of limestone that rest by the water's edge; large stalactites grow from the ceiling high above. The ceiling and surrounding cliffs of the grotto are home to moss, maidenhair fern and cliff swallows. The Ashe juniper (cedar) uplands of the preserve are home to the endangered golden-cheeked warbler.

The natural pool and creek are not chemically treated, so water quality is monitored regularly and swimming is occasionally restricted. Hamilton Pool is part of the Balcones Canyonlands Preserve and is a protected environment.

== History ==
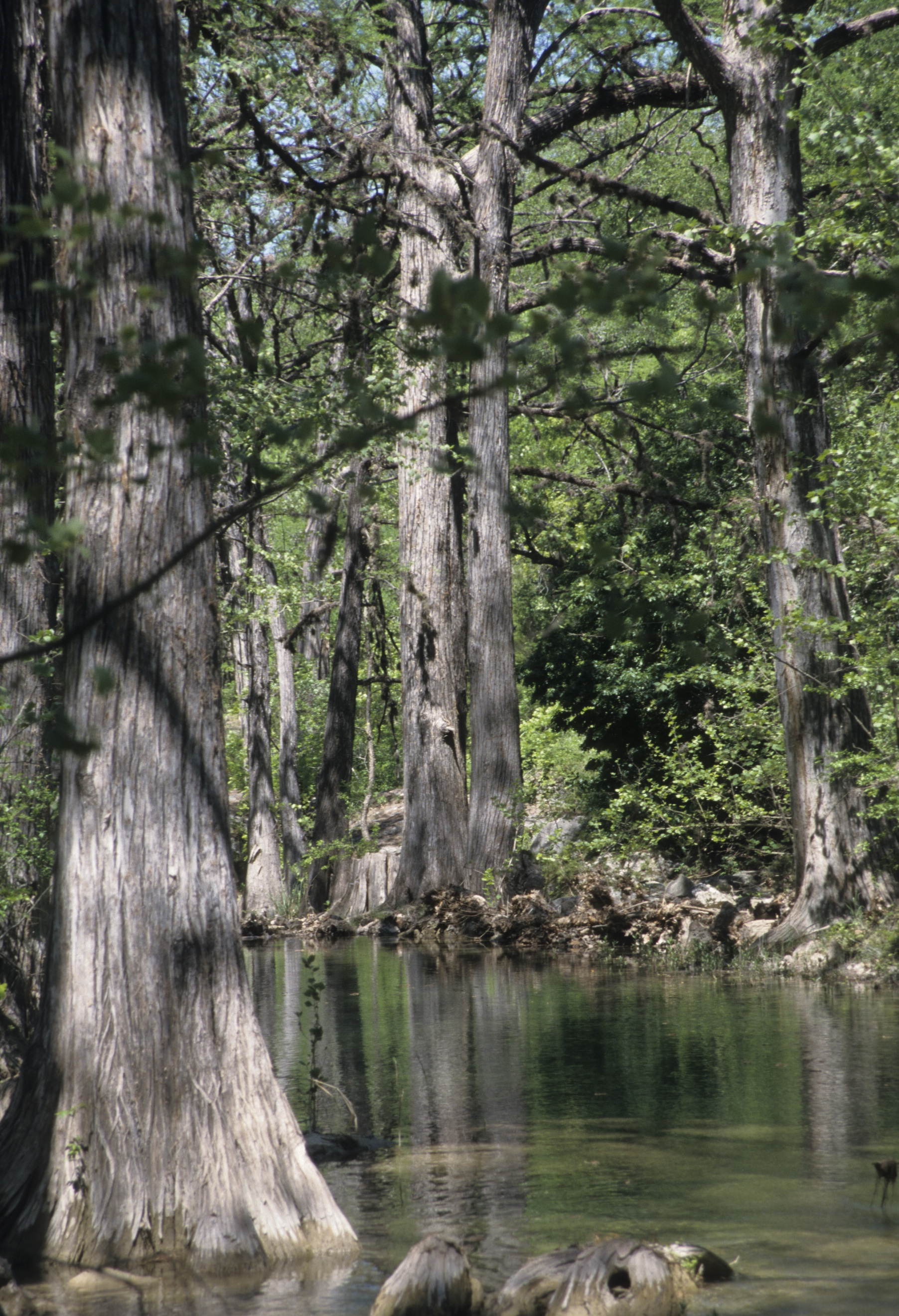
Bald Cypress trees growing along the small stream draining Hamilton Pool

Prior to the 19th century, the Tonkawa and Lipan Apaches lived in the area. In the mid-1860s, Morgan C. Hamilton owned the property now known as Hamilton Pool Preserve. His brother, Andrew Jackson Hamilton, evidently visited the grotto while serving as Texas governor (1865–66). In the 1880s, the Reimers' family, immigrants from Germany, bought the property to raise sheep and cattle. Legend says that their eight-year-old son discovered the collapsed grotto.

Although ranchers might have considered the grotto a safety hazard for their livestock, the Reimers soon realized its value as a recreational area and opened the property for public use. Around the turn of the 20th century, the site did not attract many visitors, but by the 1960s, and on into the 1980s, Hamilton Pool's popularity had increased. The land suffered from sheer numbers and few restrictions.

In addition to impact from the visiting public, cattle, sheep and goats grazed the delicate ecosystem for several decades, resulting in changes to the native vegetation. In 1980, the Texas Parks and Wildlife Department cited Hamilton Pool as the most significant natural area in rural Travis County. In 1985, Travis County purchased 232 acres (0.94 km^{2}) from the Reimers family and implemented an aggressive land management plan to restore Hamilton Pool. Now, as a result of the restoration plan, the ecosystems of Hamilton Pool are recovering.

Ongoing land management practices at Hamilton Pool Preserve include prescribed burns, prairie restoration, endangered species surveys, biological inventories and water quality monitoring.

In February 2021, a series of five winter storms, including Winter Storm Uri and Winter Storm Viola, swept through Texas in rapid succession. Ice wedges formed in the overhanging cliff and the frequency of rockfalls greatly increased, resulting in the closure of the pool itself. A portion of pool re-opened for swimming in May 2022 but has intermittently closed since then due to high bacteria levels. The trail underneath the overhang remains closed.

== Ecology ==
The preserve is home to the chatterbox orchid (Epipactis gigantea) and the eastern red bay (Persea borbonia).

== Filming location ==
The 1990 movie The Hot Spot, the 2007 film Teeth the 2010 film Predators, the 2011 film The Tree of Life, and the 2015 music video for the song "Charlie Gray" by the Dallas-based indie-rock band Valise all filmed scenes at Hamilton Pool.

== Access ==
Hamilton Pool is open every day for hiking and sight-seeing. Reservations are required for entry and these are made online through the Travis County Hamilton Pool Preserve Website. The online reservation fee is $12. Additionally, there is an $8 Travis County Park entry fee per person, with various discounts for seniors, disabled veterans.

== See also ==
- List of waterfalls
