= Sainte-Colombe-la-Commanderie =

- Commune
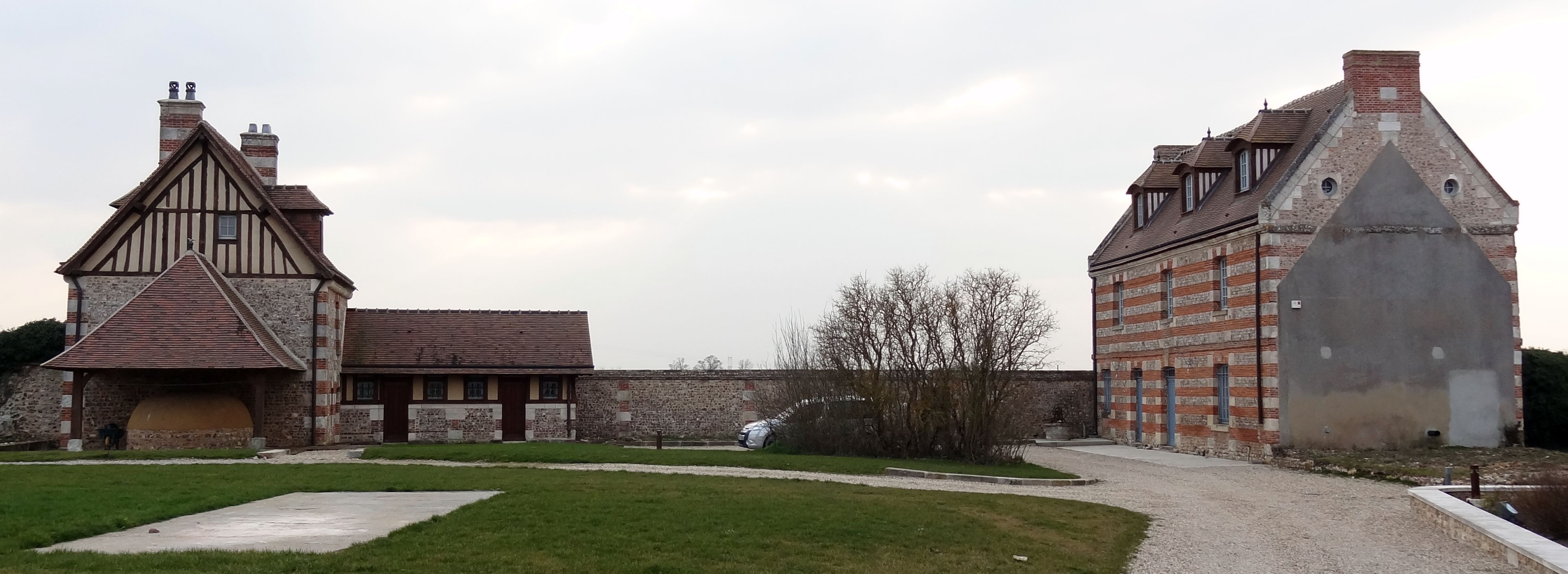
- The commandery of Saint-Étienne-de-Renneville
- Location of Sainte-Colombe-la-Commanderie
- Location within France Location within Normandy
- Coordinates: 49°06′16″N 0°56′14″E
- Country: France
- Region: Normandy
- Department: Eure
- Arrondissement: Bernay
- Canton: Le Neubourg

Government
  - Mayor (2020–2026): Jacky Buyze
- Area^{1}: 10.86 km^{2} (4.19 sq mi)
- Elevation: 149 m (489 ft)
- Highest elevation: 146 m (479 ft)
- Lowest elevation: 132 m (433 ft)
- Population (2023): 841
  - Density: 77.4/km^{2} (201/sq mi)
- Time zone: UTC+01:00 (CET)
  - Summer (DST): UTC+02:00 (CEST)
- INSEE/Postal code: 27524 /27110
- ^{1} French Land Register data, which excludes lakes, ponds, glaciers > 1 km^{2} (0.386 sq mi or 247 acres) and river estuaries.

Sainte-Colombe-la-Commanderie (French pronunciation: [sɛ̃t kɔlɔ̃b la kɔmɑ̃dʁi]) is a commune in the Eure department and Normandy region in northern France.

== Population ==
Historical population
Year	Pop.	±% p.a.
1968	345	—
1975	441	+3.57%
1982	498	+1.75%
1990	546	+1.16%
1999	588	+0.83%
2007	646	+1.18%
2012	758	+3.25%
2017	848	+2.27%
2023	841	−0.14%
Source: INSEE

== See also ==
- Communes of the Eure department
