= Portrait of an Assassin =

- Directed by: Bernard-Roland
- Written by: Henri Decoin; Marcel Rivet (adaptation cinematographique); Charles Spaak; François Chalais (dialogue de)
- Screenplay by: (Marcel Rivet (scenario & screenplay)
- Produced by: Hubert Vincent Bréchignac
- Starring: Maria Montez; Erich von Stroheim; Arletty; Pierre Brasseur
- Cinematography: Roger Hubert
- Edited by: Germaine Artus
- Music by: Maurice Thiriet
- Color process: Black and white
- Production companies: S.E.C.A. U.T.C.
- Distributed by: Societe d'Edition et de Location de Films
- Release date: 25 November 1949
- Running time: 90 minutes
- Country: France
- Language: French
- Box office: 1,860,774 admissions (France)

Portrait of an Assassin (French: Portrait d'un assassin) is a 1949 French drama thriller film directed by Bernard-Roland and starring Maria Montez, Erich von Stroheim, Arletty and Pierre Brasseur.

== Plot ==
Christina (Montez) is the sadistic manager of a circus show, who uses her attractiveness to seduce men and force them to do dangerous acrobatic acts. One such lover, Eric (Von Stroheim), became handicapped.

Christina seduces Fabius (Brasseur) but his wife Martha (Arletty), turns up and performs the acrobatic act and dies. Fabius then murders Christina in revenge, does the act himself, survives and confesses.

== Cast ==
- Maria Montez as Lucienne de Rinck
- Erich von Stroheim as Eric (as Eric von Stroheim)
- Arletty as Martha
- Pierre Brasseur as Fabius / Jean
- Marcel Dalio as Fred dit Bébé (as Dalio)
- Marcel Dieudonné as Prosper
- Les Fratellini as Eux-mêmes
- Jules Berry as Pfeiffer

== Production ==
The movie was financed by a French furrier. It was originally announced that the film would be called Portrait of a Murderer and would star Maria Montez and Orson Welles. "Could be the battlingest picture of the century", wrote Hedda Hopper.

Orson Welles and Charles Lederer were meant to do some work on the film. The producer Jacques Gauthier sued them for $1 million each for non performance.

Reportedly Montez and Arletty feuded during filming causing retakes to be required.

== See also ==
- List of French films of 1949
