= Bernard-Roland =

French film director and producer

- Born: 22 November 1910; Moulins, Allier, France
- Died: 10 March 1987 (aged 76); Canicattini Bagni, Sicily, Italy
- Occupations: Producer, Writer, Director
- Years active: 1934-1981 (film & TV)

Bernard-Roland (1910–1987) was a French film director and producer. He is also known Bernard Roland.

== Selected filmography ==
- Mademoiselle Swing (1942)
- The Midnight Sun (1943)
- The Ménard Collection (1944)
- The Ideal Couple (1946)
- We Are Not Married (1946)
- Portrait of an Assassin (1949)
- Crime at the Concert Mayol (1954)
- Cocagne (1961)

== Bibliography ==
- Rège, Philippe. Encyclopedia of French Film Directors, Volume 1. Scarecrow Press, 2009.
