= Jean Hémard =

French film director (died 1933)

Jean Hémard (October 8, 1894 or 1908-December 5, 1933) was a French film director. He was also an assistant director on several films. Hémard was of "Polish extraction".

Claude Dauphin starred in some of his films. He assisted Raymond Bernard on the film The Chess Player.

== Filmography ==
- Cendrillon de Paris (1930)
- The Fortune (1931) La Fortune
- To the Polls, Citizens (1932) Aux urnes, citoyens!
- Paris-Soleil (1933)
