= Dead Calm (novel) =

Novel by Charles Williams

- Hardcover edition
- Author: Charles Williams
- Language: English
- Genre: Thriller
- Publisher: Viking Press
- Publication date: 1963
- Publication place: United States
- Media type: Print
- ISBN: 0-670-26042-8

Dead Calm is a 1963 novel by Charles Williams. It was the basis for the unfinished Orson Welles film The Deep, was adapted by Phillip Noyce as the film Dead Calm (1989), and is the sequel to Williams' lesser-known romantic thriller Aground (1960).

== Plot ==
Honeymooners John and Rae Ingram take their yacht for a cruise through the Indian Ocean, where they rescue a young man, Hughie Warriner, from a dinghy. Hughie claims to have escaped from another vessel after three crew members succumbed to food poisoning. John, a former naval officer, is suspicious of inconsistencies in Hughie's story and goes to inspect the sinking ship while Hughie sleeps. He discovers passengers Russ Bellows and Mrs. Warriner, alive and begging for help. Meanwhile, upon discovering that John has left, Hughie panics, takes Rae hostage, and begins motoring her boat away from the sinking ship.

On board the sinking ship, John learns that Hughie, Mrs. Warriner, Russ, and Russ' wife, Mrs. Bellows, were vacationing when Hughie suffered an agoraphobic reaction while diving with Mrs. Bellows and accidentally killed her by trying to climb onto her shoulders. The realization of what he'd done resulted in Hughie suffering a psychotic break. Mrs. Warriner further tells John that Hughie, though a gifted artist, has the mind of a child, his emotional growth having been stunted by his overbearing father and a codependent relationship with an inappropriately affectionate mother.

On board the Ingrams' boat, Rae is able to surmise this herself from Hughie's behavior and assumes the role of a caring mother figure in order to lull him into a false sense of security, while preparing to kill him with a shotgun John has stashed in their stateroom. She is unable to do this, and in a fit of rage he destroys the gun. She then tricks him into taking a codeine laced drink, ties him up and heads back to rescue her husband. She overcomes a disabled engine, destroyed instruments and coming darkness to locate the sinking boat.

Ultimately, John and Russ are able to sufficiently repair the sinking boat and rendezvous with Hughie and Rae. When everyone is reunited, Hughie suffers a flashback, sees Russ as his father, and throws himself and Russ overboard. Although John attempts to rescue them, Hughie restrains Russ, causing them both to sink into the ocean and drown.

John gives a sympathetic psychological analysis of Hughie as he, Rae, and Mrs. Warriner see that a new wind has come in that will take them all home.

== Inspiration ==
The book bears many similarities to the highly publicized 1961 Bluebelle murders, in which a former sailor murdered his wife and four family members of the boat he was captaining before intentionally scuttling it and escaping in a dinghy.

== Film adaptations ==
- Orson Welles worked on a film adaptation of Dead Calm, an unfinished film titled The Deep, from 1966 to 1969. Welles produced and wrote the film, as well as played the role of Russ Brewer opposite Jeanne Moreau and Laurence Harvey. The film is incomplete; several major scenes were never shot, and portions of the soundtrack remain unrecorded. The original negative has been lost, and the film exists in two work prints, one in black and white and the other in color (the way the film was intended to be shown).
- Dead Calm (1989) Australian thriller film starring Sam Neill, Nicole Kidman, and Billy Zane. The film was directed by Australian filmmaker Phillip Noyce and filmed around the Great Barrier Reef.

== Publication history ==
- Hardbound. Viking, 1963. ISBN 0-670-26042-8
