= Charles Williams (American author) =

American author (1909–1975)

Charles K. Williams
- Born: August 13, 1909; San Angelo, Texas, U.S.
- Died: April 5, 1975 (aged 65); Los Angeles, California, U.S.
- Occupations: Novelist; electronics inspector
- Spouse: Lasca Foster (m. 1939; died 1972)
- Children: 1
- Writing career
- Period: 1951–1975
- Genres: Noir

Charles K. Williams (August 13, 1909 – April 5, 1975) was an American author of crime fiction. He is regarded by some critics as one of the finest suspense novelists of the 1950s and 1960s. His 1951 debut, the paperback novel Hill Girl, sold more than a million copies. A dozen of his books have been adapted for movies, most popularly Dead Calm and The Hot Spot.

== Life ==
Williams was born in the central Texas town of San Angelo. After attending school through tenth grade, in 1929 he enlisted with the US Merchant Marine. He served for ten years before quitting to marry Lasca Foster. Having trained as a radioman during his seafaring career, Williams worked as an electronics inspector, first for RCA in Galveston, Texas, and later at Puget Sound Navy Yard in Washington State. He also worked as a wireless operator, radar technician and radio service engineer as a civilian with the U.S. Navy during the World War II era. He and his wife then relocated to San Francisco, where he worked for Mackay Radio company until the publication of his first novel, Hill Girl, in 1951. It was a great success, and Williams spent the remainder of his professional career as an author, primarily of novels, with several screenplays also to his credit. The couple changed residences frequently and apparently spent considerable time in France, where Williams's work has an excellent reputation. After the death of his wife from cancer in 1972, Williams purchased property on the California-Oregon border where he lived alone for a time in a trailer. After relocating to Los Angeles, Williams committed suicide in his apartment in the Van Nuys neighborhood in early April 1975. Williams had been depressed since the death of his wife, and his emotional state worsened as sales of his books declined when stand-alone thrillers began to lose popularity in the early 70s. He was survived by a daughter, Alison.

== Literary style ==
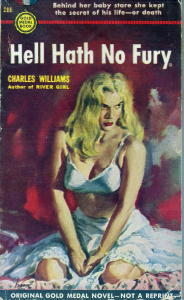
Hell Hath No Fury (1953), one of Williams's novels.

Williams's work is identified with the noir fiction subgenre of "hardboiled" crime writing. His 1953 novel Hell Hath No Fury—-published by the defining crime fiction company, Gold Medal Books—-was the first paperback original to merit a review from renowned critic Anthony Boucher of The New York Times. Boucher relates Williams to two of the most famous noir fiction writers: "The striking suspense technique...may remind you of [Cornell] Woolrich; the basic story, with its bitter blend of sex and criminality, may recall James M. Cain. But Mr. Williams is individually himself in his sharp but unmannered prose style and in his refusal to indulge in sentimental compromises." Ed Gorman's description of a characteristic Williams novel, Man on the Run (1958), outlines the essential elements that associate it with the noir fiction category: "a) a falsely accused man trying to elude police, b) a lonely woman as desperate in her way as the man on the run, c) enough atmospherics (night, rain, fog) to enshroud a hundred films noir." Cultural critic Geoffrey O'Brien further details Williams's "chief characteristics":

a powerfully evoked natural setting, revelation of character through sexual attitudes and behavior, and a conversational narrative voice that makes the flimsiest tale seem worth telling.... His narrator is generally an ordinary, curiously amoral fellow fueled by greed and lust but curiously detached from his own crimes. [A number of his books] are variations on the same serviceable plot: boy meets money, boy gets money, boy loses money. Each of them hinges on a woman, and it is in the intricacies of the man-woman relationship that Williams finds his real subject.... [O]ften the woman is both more intelligent and—- even when she is a criminal—- more aware of moral complexities than the affectless hero.

Lee Horsley describes how Williams frequently satirizes his male protagonists' attitudes, while implicitly reassessing the traditional genre figure of the femme fatale.

Williams's novel River Girl (1951) is described by noir fiction expert George Tuttle as a "classic example of backwoods noir...us[ing] an Erskine Caldwell type setting to heighten the sexual overtones of the story." Many of Williams's other novels are also of this "backwoods noir" type: Hill Girl; Big City Girl; Go Home, Stranger; The Diamond Bikini; Girl Out Back; and Uncle Sagamore and His Girls. Williams also produced, particularly late in his career, what might be called "blue-water noir": Scorpion Reef, The Sailcloth Shroud, Aground, Dead Calm, and And The Deep Blue Sea. Historian Woody Haut argues that Williams, like fellow crime novelist Charles Willeford, wrote stories fueled by an "antipathy to state power, state crimes and the creation of social conditions leading to criminal activity. Relying on wit, humor and ingenious plotting, Williams's characters constantly attempt to outwit the system."

== Historical notability ==
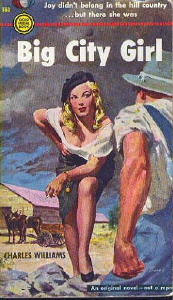
Cover of Big City Girl (1951)

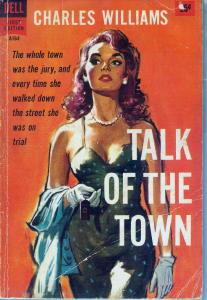
Cover of Talk of the Town (1958)

Of Williams's 22 novels, 16 were paperback originals, and 11 of them Gold Medals; he is described by Gorman as "the best of all the Gold Medal writers." Haut calls Williams the "foremost practitioner" of the style of suspense that typified American crime literature from the mid-1950s through the early 1960s: "So prolific and accomplished a writer was Charles Williams that he single-handedly made many subsequent pulp culture novels seem like little more than parodies." Fellow "hardboiled" author John D. MacDonald cited him as one of the more undeservedly neglected writers of his generation. O'Brien, describing Williams as being "overdue" for "wider appreciation," describes him as a stylist consistently faithful to "the narrative values which make his books so entertaining and his present neglect so inexplicable."

== Williams on screen ==
Between 1960 and 1990 twelve of Williams' novels were adapted for cinema or television in the United States, France, and Australia:

- All the Way – The 3rd Voice (1960)
- Nothing in Her Way – Peau de banane, a.k.a. Banana Peel (1963)
- The Big Bite – Le Gros coup (1964)
- Aground – L' Arme à gauche, a.k.a. The Dictator's Guns (1965)
- The Wrong Venus – Don't Just Stand There! (1968)
- Dead Calm – The Deep (1970; unfinished); Dead Calm (1989)
- The Diamond Bikini – Fantasia chez les ploucs, a.k.a. Fantasia Among the Squares (1971)
- Talk of the Town (uncredited) – The pilot episode of Cannon (1971)
- The Sailcloth Shroud – The Man Who Would Not Die, a.k.a. Target in the Sun (1975)
- The Long Saturday Night – Vivement dimanche!, a.k.a. Confidentially Yours (1983)
- Man on the Run – Mieux vaut courir (1989)
- Hill Girl – La Fille des collines (1990)
- Hell Hath No Fury – The Hot Spot (1990)

Of the preceding, Williams wrote the screenplays for Don't Just Stand There! and, with Nona Tyson, The Hot Spot. He is credited as co-screenwriter for Peau de banane and L' Arme à gauche. He also wrote the screenplay for The Pink Jungle (1968), adapting a novel by Alan Williams (no relation), and cowrote Les Félins (Joy House) (1964), adapting a novel by Day Keene.

== Bibliography ==
Novels in publication order, with alternate titles in the US and the UK; original year of publication; publisher name; and, for Gold Medal and Dell books, initial publication number:

- Hill Girl (1951; Gold Medal 141)
- Big City Girl (1951; Gold Medal 163)
- River Girl (a.k.a. The Catfish Tangle) (1951; Gold Medal G207)
- Hell Hath No Fury (a.k.a. The Hot Spot) (1953; Gold Medal 286)
- Nothing in Her Way (1953; Gold Medal 340)
- Go Home, Stranger (1954; Gold Medal 371)
- A Touch of Death (a.k.a. Mix Yourself a Redhead; based on 1953 novella And Share Alike) (1954; Gold Medal 434)
- Scorpion Reef (a.k.a. Gulf Coast Girl; based on novella Flight to Nowhere) (1955; Macmillan hc [reprint: Dell 898])
- The Big Bite (1956; Dell A114)
- The Diamond Bikini (1956; Gold Medal s607)
- Girl Out Back (a.k.a. Operator; based on 1957 novella titled either Operator or Operation) (1958; Dell B114)
- Talk of the Town (a.k.a. Stain of Suspicion; also condensed under that title) (1958; Dell A164)
- All the Way (a.k.a. The Concrete Flamingo) (1958; Dell A165)
- Man on the Run (a.k.a. Man in Motion) (1958; Gold Medal 822)
- Uncle Sagamore and His Girls (1959; Gold Medal s908)
- The Sailcloth Shroud (1960; Viking hc [reprint: Dell D410])
- Aground (1960; Viking hc)
- The Long Saturday Night (a.k.a. Confidentially Yours; Finally, Sunday!) (1962; Gold Medal s1200)
- Dead Calm (based on an earlier novella Pacific Honeymoon) (1963; Viking hc)
- The Wrong Venus (a.k.a. Don't Just Stand There) (1966; New American Library hc)
- And The Deep Blue Sea (1971; Signet pb)
- Man on a Leash (1973; Putnam hc)

Note: The novel Fires of Youth (1960; Magnet 309) is credited to "Charles Williams" but was actually written by James Lincoln Collier.

== Sources ==
=== Published ===
- Boucher, Anthony (1953). "Report on Criminals at Large," New York Times Book Review, November 29.
- Gorman, Ed (1998a). "Fifteen Impressions of Charles Williams," in The Big Book of Noir, ed. Ed Gorman, Lee Server, and Martin H. Greenberg (New York: Carroll & Graf), 251–254. ISBN 0-7867-0574-4
- Gorman, Ed (1998b). "The Golden Harvest: Twenty-Five-Cent Paperbacks," in The Big Book of Noir, ed. Gorman et al., 183–190.
- Gorman, Ed (1998c). "John D. MacDonald," in The Big Book of Noir, ed. Gorman et al., 209–211.
- Haut, Woody (1995). Pulp Culture: Hardboiled Fiction and the Cold War (London: Serpent's Tail). ISBN 1-85242-319-6
- Horsley, Lee (2005). Twentieth-Century Crime Fiction (Oxford and New York: Oxford University Press). ISBN 0-19-928345-1
- O'Brien, Geoffrey (1997). Hardboiled America: Lurid Paperbacks and the Masters of Noir, expanded ed. (New York: Da Capo). ISBN 0-306-80773-4

=== Online ===
- Lynskey, Ed (2004). "The High Seas of Charles Williams" well-sourced essay by mystery writer; part of Allan Guthrie's Noir Originals webzine.
- Tuttle, George (1997). "What Is Noir?" essay and chronology by published noir critic.

=== On the success of Hill Girl ===
- An article by Ed Lynskey, "Charles Williams: More Than a Slight Return", which appeared in the August 2003 issue of Allan Guthrie's Noir Originals webzine, claims that Hill Girl "sold an astonishing 2.5 million copies." This unsourced claim is almost certainly an overstatement, even if it includes foreign sales, which is not hinted at. The cover of the book's eighth Gold Medal printing, dated August 1957, states, "Now in its second million," meaning before the given printing—likely 100,000 or 200,000 copies—Hill Girl had probably sold a total of 900,000 or 1 million copies. According to the edition's front matter, the first six printings all occurred between December 1950 (though the novel is copyrighted 1951) and November 1951. The seventh took place in November 1954. That three-year gap and the one of nearly three years that preceded the eighth printing indicate a substantial slowdown in what, by any standard, are still very impressive sales. Given this publishing record, it is hard to imagine Hill Girl wound up selling even as many as 1.5 million copies through Gold Medal. There is no evidence of it ever having been put out by another American publisher. In his essay "What Is Noir?" (see above), George Tuttle, though he does not indicate the source of his figures, claims Gold Medal sales of 1,226,890 copies for Hill Girl, which is entirely plausible.
