= Munich Film Archive =

Film museum in Munich, Germany

Coordinates: 48°8′6.36″N 11°34′22.98″E

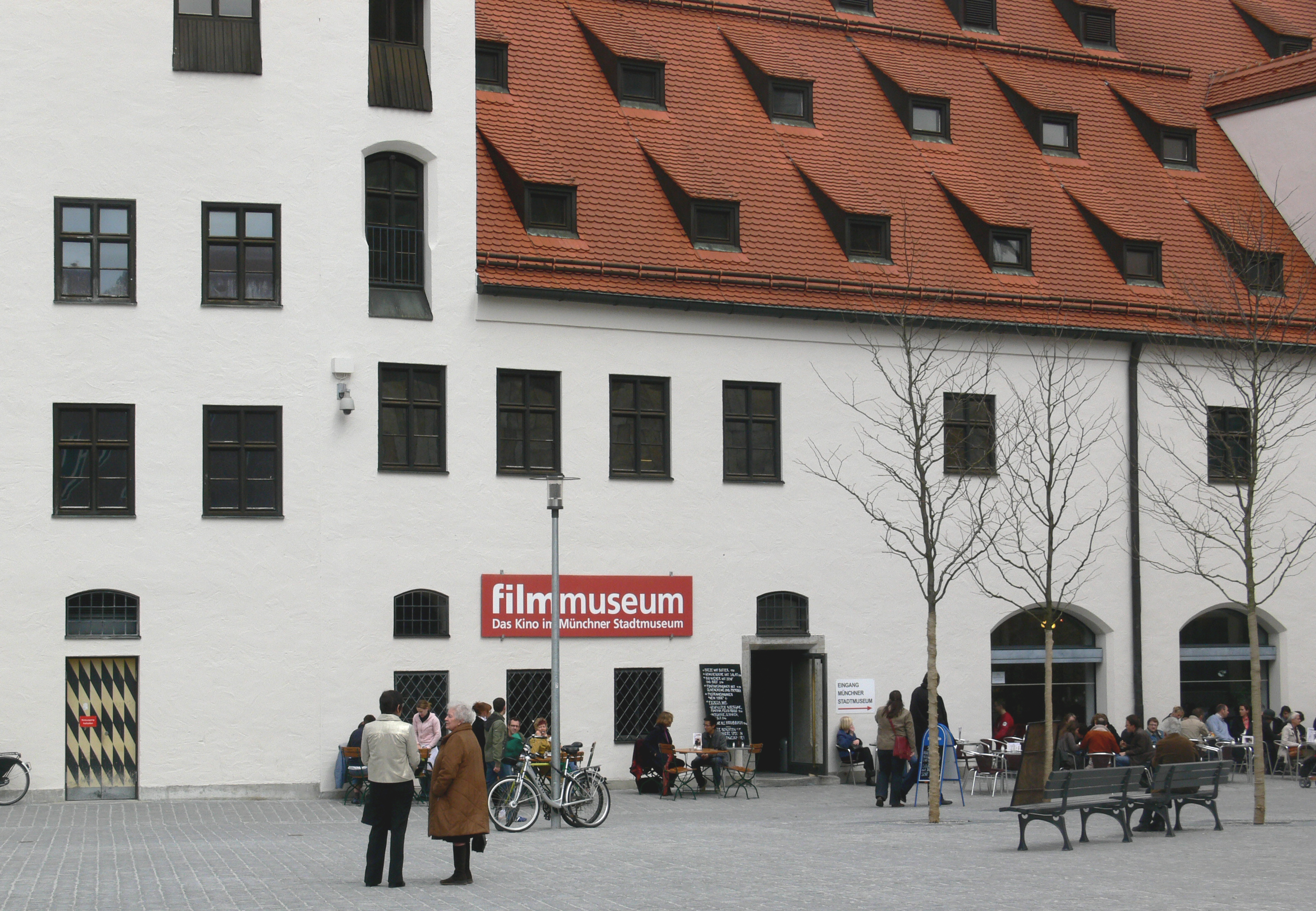
- Established: 1963
- Location: Munich, Germany
- Type: Film Museum

The Munich Film Archive, in the Munich Stadtmuseum, is one of eight film museums in Germany. It has no showrooms and is limited to screening the films in a single cinema with 165 seats, as well as collecting, archiving, and restoring film copies. All analog and digital formats (except 70mm) can be shown.

== History ==
The Film Museum was founded in late 1963 as a department of the Munich Stadtmuseum and holds an extensive collection of copies of historical films. Which are also restored and copied locally. Special focus is placed on the collection of German silent films, the work of the German film immigrants from the Nazism period, the New German Cinema, as well as the Munich film history (e.g. Karl Valentin, Herbert Achternbusch, documentary material about Munich). As cinematheque, the museum makes its collection accessible to public and research. The in-house cinema - one of the first municipal theaters of the Federal Republic of Germany - is one of the few places in Germany, in which full historical-film retrospectives and silent films with live musical accompaniment are regularly presented. The museum does not have a permanent exhibition. Yearlong efforts in the 1980s and 1990s to attain a second cinema and an appreciation of the cinema through separation from the Munich Stadtmuseum and a renaming to the Bavarian Film Museum were unsuccessful.

The Munich Film Museum has been pioneering work in the restoration of films since the 1970s. The then head, Enno Patalas, began with the restoration of German silent films from directors such as Fritz Lang, Ernst Lubitsch, G.W. Pabst or F. W. Murnau. Patalas undertook pianist Aljoscha Zimmermann as the cinema pianist. Zimmermann researched for the original scores or wrote accompanying music.

The film museum houses the cinematic works of filmmakers, who as frontier workers cannot be assigned a national film archive, such as Orson Welles, Thomas Harlan, Jean-Marie Straub and Danièle Huillet, Nicolas Humbert, Werner Schroeter and Wim Wenders. Since 1995, the museum possesses the estates of Orson Welles, in particular to the materials of unfinished films. The museum was given the Welles estates from his last companion Oja Kodar.

In 2006, the museum published its reconstructions and restorations on DVD in the Edition Filmmuseum.

The film museum is, since 2012, co-organizer of the annual film screenings of Filmfest München and the International Festival of the University of Television and Film Munich.

The museum is co-organizer of the Internationale Stummfilmtage (International Silent Film Festival) in Bonn and displays a selection of the program later in Munich.

== Literature ==
- Chris Dercon: Auferstehung und Wiedergeburt. Das Münchner Filmmuseum wird 50 Jahre alt und ist doch quicklebendig - wie dieser Gratulant, Fan und langjährige Nachbar im Haus der Kunst bezeugen kann. In: Süddeutsche Zeitung, 28 November 2013, p. 14.
- Filmmuseum München (ed.): 50 Jahre Filmmuseum München. Munich 2013
