= Workprint =

Rough version of a film or TV program

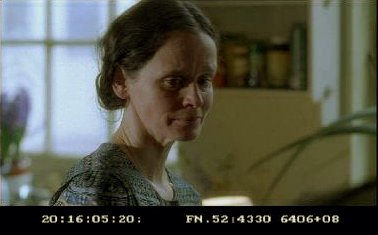
Frame captured from a digital editing workprint. The timecode on the left begins with a userbit designating the lab roll and the code on the right is a Keykode.

A workprint is a rough version of a motion picture or television program, used by the film editors during the editing process. Such copies generally contain original recorded sound that will later be re-dubbed, stock footage as placeholders for missing shots or special effects, and animation tests for in-production animated shots or sequences.

== History ==
For most of the first century of filmmaking, workprints were done using second-generation prints from the original camera negatives. After the editor and director approved of the final edit of the workprint, the same edits were made to the negative. With the conversion to digital editing, workprints are now generally created on a non-linear editing system using telecined footage from the original film or video sources (in contrast to a pirate "telecine", which is made with a much higher-generation film print). Occasionally, early digital workprints of films have been bootlegged and made available on the Internet. They sometimes appear months in advance of an official release.

There are also director's cut versions of films that are only available on bootleg, such as the workprint version of Richard Williams' The Thief and the Cobbler. Although movie studios generally do not make full-length workprints readily available to the public, there are exceptions. Examples include the "Work-In-Progress" version of Beauty and the Beast (albeit it is unfinished footage intertwined with the DVD release on top with the finalized sound mix), and the Denver/Dallas pre-release version of Blade Runner. Deleted scenes or bonus footage included on DVD releases are sometimes left in workprint format as well, e.g. the Scrubs DVD extras. A workprint as source for a leaked television show is rather unusual, but it happened with the third season's first episode of Homeland a month before it aired.

== One-light ==
A one-light is a timed workprint made using a single setting of the three lights (red, green and blue) used to make a color film print. Since a fully timed print requires the presence of a skilled person called a color timer (US) or film grader (UK), a one-light print is more economical for printing dailies (positive) from rushes (negative). Cinematographers often require one-light workprints to better judge their film exposures.
