= Bibliography of Orson Welles =

This is a bibliography of books by or about the director and actor Orson Welles.

== Books by Orson Welles ==
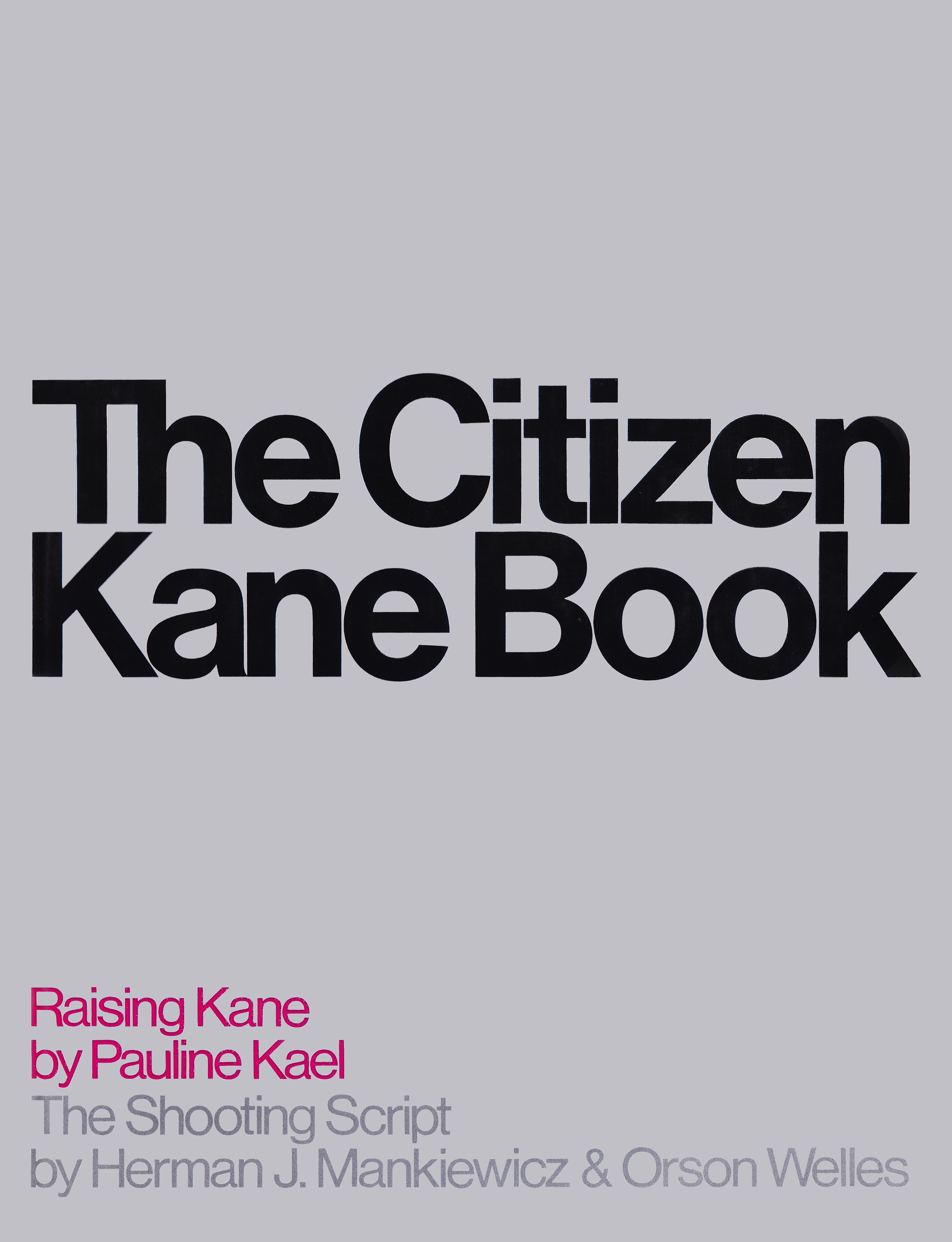
The Citizen Kane Book (1971)

=== Shakespeare studies ===
- Hill, Roger and Welles, Orson (eds.). Everybody's Shakespeare. Woodstock, Illinois: Todd Press, 1934. (omnibus volume and three separate volumes, with abridged and annotated scripts of The Merchant of Venice, Julius Caesar and Twelfth Night)
- Welles, Orson, and Hill, Roger (eds.). The Mercury Shakespeare. New York: Harper & Row, 1939. (revised version of the above; omnibus volume and three separate volumes, with abridged and annotated scripts of The Merchant of Venice, Julius Caesar and Twelfth Night)
- Welles, Orson, and Hill, Roger (eds.). The Mercury Shakespeare: Macbeth. New York: Harper & Row, 1941.

=== Scripts and screenplays ===
==== Plays ====
- Welles, Orson. Miracle à Hollywood, et À Bon Entendeur. Paris: Gallimard, 1952. (two plays, [The Unthinking Lobster, and Fair Warning], only published in French)
- Welles, Orson. Moby Dick—Rehearsed. London: Samuel French, Inc., 1965. ISBN 0-573-61242-0 (play).
- France, Richard (ed.), Welles, Orson. Orson Welles on Shakespeare: The W.P.A. and Mercury Theatre Playscripts. New York: Greenwood Press, 1990. ISBN 9780313273346 (scripts of 1930s Welles abridgments of Macbeth, Julius Caesar and Five Kings)
- Tarbox, Todd (ed.); Hill, Roger and Welles, Orson. Marching Song: A Play. Lanham, Maryland: Rowman & Littlefield, 2019. ISBN 978-1538125526 (first publication of an unperformed play, written in 1932)

==== Radio plays ====
- Welles, Orson. His Honor—The Mayor. New York: The Free Company, 1941. (script of radio play broadcast April 6, 1941)

==== Screenplays ====
- Fry, Nicholas (ed.), Welles, Orson. The Trial. London: Lorrimer, 1970. (screenplay, first published in French by l’Avant scene du cinema in 1963)
- Kael, Pauline, Mankiewicz, Herman J. and Welles, Orson. The Citizen Kane Book. Boston: Little, Brown and Company, 1971. ISBN 0-436-23030-5 (screenplay prefaced by Kael's essay "Raising Kane")
- Comito, Terry (ed.), Welles, Orson. Touch of Evil. New Brunswick, New Jersey: Rutgers University Press, 1985 (screenplay).
- Pepper, James and Rosenbaum, Jonathan (eds.), Welles, Orson, and Kodar, Oja. The Big Brass Ring. Santa Barbara, California: Santa Teresa Press, 1987. ISBN 9780944166017 (unproduced screenplay)
- Gellert Lyons, Bridget (ed.) Welles, Orson. Chimes at Midnight. New Brunswick, New Jersey: Rutgers University Press, 1988. (screenplay)
- Pepper, James and Rosenbaum, Jonathan (eds.), Welles, Orson. The Cradle Will Rock. Santa Barbara, California: Santa Teresa Press, 1994. ISBN 0-944166-06-7 (unproduced screenplay)
- Gosetti, Giorgio (ed.), Welles, Orson and Kodar, Oja. The Other Side of the Wind. Locarno, Switzerland: Cahiers du cinéma/ Locarno Film Festival, 2005. (screenplay of a film which was incomplete at the time of publication - subsequently completed in 2018)

=== Novels and short stories ===
- Welles, Orson and others. The Lives of Harry Lime. London: Pocket Books, 1952. (short stories)
- Welles, Orson. Une Grosse Légume. Paris: Gallimard, 1953. (This novel possibly was ghostwritten by Maurice Bessy and only published in French. An English-language version credited to Welles was rediscovered in 2018 and will be published in English in 2027.)
- Welles, Orson. Mr. Arkadin. Paris: Gallimard, 1954. (novel ghostwritten by Maurice Bessy, subsequently translated into English)

=== Interviews ===
- Rosenbaum, Jonathan (ed.), Welles, Orson and Bogdanovich, Peter. This is Orson Welles. New York: HarperCollins, 1992. ISBN 0-06-016616-9 (revised and expanded in 1998)
- Estrin, Mark W. (ed.), Welles, Orson. Orson Welles Interviews. Jackson, Mississippi: University Press of Mississippi, 2002.

=== Conversations ===
- Tarbox, Todd. Orson Welles and Roger Hill: A Friendship in Three Acts. Albany, Georgia: BearManor Media, 2013. ISBN 1-59393-260-X
- Biskind, Peter (ed.), Jaglom, Henry. My Lunches With Orson: Conversations Between Henry Jaglom and Orson Welles. New York: Metropolitan Books (Henry Holt and Company), 2013. ISBN 9780805097252

=== Artwork ===
- Welles, Orson. Les Bravades. New York: Workman, 1996. ISBN 0-7611-0595-6
- Braund, Simon (ed). Orson Welles portfolio: Sketches and drawings from the Welles estate. Titan Books, 2019. ISBN 9781789090321

=== Foreword ===
- Elliott, Bruce, Magic as a hobby, Gramercy Publishing Company, 1947.
- O'Brady, Frédéric, Extérieurs à Venise, Gallimard, 1950. (in French)
- Cintrón, Conchita, Memoirs of a bullfighter, Holt, Rinehart & Winston, NY, 1968.
- Davies, Marion, The Times We Had : Life with William Randolph Hearst, Ballantine Books, 1975.

== Books about Orson Welles ==
=== Biographies ===
- Bessy, Maurice. Orson Welles: An investigation into his films and philosophy. Crown, 1971. (abridged translation of French-language biography, first published in Paris in 1963)
- Brady, Frank. Citizen Welles: A Biography of Orson Welles. New York: Charles Scribner's Sons, 1989. ISBN 0-385-26759-2
- Callow, Simon. Orson Welles: The Road to Xanadu. London: Jonathan Cape, 1995; New York: Viking, 1996. ISBN 0-670-86722-5 (biography covering 1915–41)
- ______________. Orson Welles, Volume 2: Hello Americans. London: Jonathan Cape, 2006; New York: Viking, 2006. ISBN 0-670-87256-3 (biography covering 1941–47)
- ______________. Orson Welles, Volume 3: One-Man Band. London: Jonathan Cape, 2015; New York: Viking, 2016. ISBN 9780670024919 (biography covering 1947–65)
- ______________. Orson Welles, Volume 4. (forthcoming biography covering 1965–85)
- Feeney, F. X. Orson Welles: Power, Heart and Soul. Raleigh, North Carolina: The Critical Press, 2015. ISBN 978-1941629086
- Fowler, Roy Alexander. Orson Welles: A First Biography. London: Pendulum Publications, 1946.
- Heylin, Clinton. Despite the System: Orson Welles Versus the Hollywood Studios. Chicago Review Press, 2005. ISBN 1-55652-547-8
- Higham, Charles. Orson Welles: The Rise and Fall of an American Genius. New York: St. Martin's Press, 1985. ISBN 0-312-58929-8
- Leaming, Barbara. Orson Welles. New York: Viking, 1985. ISBN 0-670-52895-1
- McBride, Joseph. Orson Welles. Harcourt Brace, 1977.
- McGilligan, Patrick. Young Orson: The Years of Luck and Genius on the Path to Citizen Kane. New York: HarperCollins, 2015. ISBN 0062112481
- Noble, Peter. The Fabulous Orson Welles. London: Hutchinson and Co., 1956.
- Thomson, David. Rosebud: The Story of Orson Welles. New York: Vintage, 1997. ISBN 978-0679772835
- Valentinetti, Claudio M. Orson Welles. Florence: La Nuova Italia, 1980. (in Italian)
- Visdei, Anca. Orson Welles. Éditions de Fallois, 2015. (in French)
- Whaley, Bart. Orson Welles: the man who was magic. Ebook, 2011.

=== Studies of Citizen Kane (1941) ===
- Berthomé, Jean-Pierre and Thomas, François. Citizen Kane. Paris: Flammarion, 1992. (in French)
- Carringer, Robert. The Making of Citizen Kane. Berkeley: University of California Press, 1985.
- Gottesman, Ronald (ed.). Focus on Citizen Kane. Englewood Cliffs, New Jersey: Prentice-Hall, 1971.
- ______________________. Perspectives on Citizen Kane. New York: G.K. Hall/Macmillan, 1996.
- Joxe, Sandra, Citizen Kane, Orson Welles. Paris : Hatier, 1990. (in French)
- Kael, Pauline (ed.). The Citizen Kane Book. New York: Little, Brown and Company, 1971.
- Lebo, Harlan. Citizen Kane: The Fiftieth Anniversary Album. New York: Doubleday, 1990.
- ____________. Citizen Kane: A Filmmaker’s Journey. New York: WGI Publishing, 2000.
- ____________. Citizen Kane: A Filmmaker’s Journey. New York: Thomas Dunne Books, 2016. ISBN 9781250077530
- Merryman, Richard. Mank. The Wit, World and Life of Herman Mankiewicz. New York: William Morrow and Company, 1978.
- Mulvey, Laura. Citizen Kane. London: BFI, 1992.
- Naremore, James (ed.). Orson Welles's Citizen Kane: a Casebook. Oxford University Press, 2004. ISBN 978-0-19-515892-2
- Pizzitola, Louis. Hearst over Hollywood: Power, passion and propaganda in the movies. Columbia University Press, 2002. ISBN 978-0231116466
- Roy, Jean. Citizen Kane [de] Orson Welles: étude critique. Paris: Nathan, 1989. (in French)
- Walsh, John Evangelist. Walking Shadows: Orson Welles, William Randolph Hearst and Citizen Kane. Madison, Wisconsin: University of Wisconsin Press, 2004.

=== Studies of other individual Welles films ===
==== Too Much Johnson (unfinished, 1938) ====
- Studer, Massimiliano. Alle origini di Quarto potere. Too Much Johnson: il film perduto di Orson Welles. Milano: Mimesis editore, 2018. (about the unfinished film Too Much Johnson). In Italian language

==== It's All True (unfinished, 1942) ====
- Benamou, Catherine L. It's All True: Orson Welles's Pan-American Odyssey. Berkeley: University of California Press, 2007. (about the unfinished film It's All True)

==== The Magnificent Ambersons (1942) ====
- Carringer, Robert. The Magnificent Ambersons: a Reconstruction. Berkeley: University of California Press, 1993. ISBN 0-520-07857-8
- Perkins, V. F. The Magnificent Ambersons. London: BFI, 1999.

==== The Stranger (1946) ====
- Strobel, Ricarda. Propagandafilm und Melodrama: Untersuchungen zu Alfred Hitchcocks "Lifeboat" und Orson Welles' "The Stranger". Berlin: Eissenschaftler-verlag, 1984. (in German)

==== Othello (1952) ====
- Anile, Alberto, L'« Otello » senz'acca. Orson Welles nel Fondo Oberdan Troiani / « Otello » Without the H. Orson Welles in the Oberdan Troiani Collection, Centro Sperimentale di Cinematografia, Cineteca Nazionale, Rubbetino, 2015. (in Italian and English)
- Del Ministro, Maurizio. Othello di Welles. Rome: Bulzoni, 2000. (about Othello) (in Italian)
- Mac Liammóir, Micháel. Put Money in Thy Purse: The Making of Orson Welles's Othello. London: Methuen, 1952. (revised edition in 1978)

==== Don Quixote (unfinished, 1955-73) ====
- Cobos, Juan, and Esteve Riambau. Don Quijote: páginas del guión cinematográfico de Orson Welles. Madrid: Asociación de Directores de Escena de España, 1992. (about the unfinished film Don Quixote) (in Spanish)
- Sciortino, Sigismondo Domenico. Don Chisciotte e il Cinema (dell')Invisibile. Rome: La Camera Verde, 2013. (about the unfinished film Don Quixote) (in Italian)

==== Touch of Evil (1957) ====
- Comito, Terry (ed.). Touch of Evil. New Brunswick, New Jersey: Rutgers University Press, 1985. (screenplay with literary criticism)

==== The Trial (1962) ====
- Trias, Jean-Phillipe. Le Procès d'Orson Welles. Paris: Cahiers du cinéma / CNDP, 2005. (about The Trial) (in French)

==== Chimes at Midnight (1965) ====
- Gellert Lyons, Bridget (ed.) Welles, Orson. Chimes at Midnight. New Brunswick, New Jersey: Rutgers University Press, 1988.
- Riambau, Esteve. Las cosas que hemos visto: Welles y Falstaff. Luces de Gálibo, 2015. (in Spanish)

==== The Deep (unfinished, 1967-70) ====
- Kovačić, Duško and Rafaelić Daniel. Orson Welles in Hvar (in Croatian)

==== F for Fake (1973) ====
- Thieme, Claudia. F for Fake and the Growth in Complexity of Orson Welles' Documentary Form. New York: Peter Lang, 1997.

==== The Other Side of the Wind (unfinished, 1970-6; posthumously completed, 2018) ====
- Gosetti, Giorgio (ed.). The Other Side of the Wind. Locarno, Switzerland: Cahiers du cinéma/ Locarno Film Festival, 2005. ISBN 9782866424329
- Karp, Josh. Orson Welles's Last Movie: The Making of The Other Side of the Wind. New York: St. Martin's Press, 2015. ISBN 9781250007087
- Yates, Michael. Shoot 'Em Dead: Orson Welles & The Other Side of the Wind. Morrisville, North Carolina: Lulu, 2020.
- Studer, Massimiliano, Orson Welles e la New Hollywood, il caso di The Other Side of The Wind, Mimesis Edizioni, 2021. (in Italian)

=== Studies of multiple Welles films ===
- Rosenbaum, Jonathan (trans.), Bazin, André. Orson Welles. Harper and Row, 1978.
- Bogdanovich, Peter. The Cinema of Orson Welles. New York: Film Library of the Museum of Modern Art, 1961.
- Cowie, Peter. The Cinema of Orson Welles. Da Capo Press, 1973.
- Drössler, Stefan, (ed.). The Unknown Orson Welles. Munich: Filmmuseum München/belleville Verlag, 2004. (about Welles's unfinished films; text in three languages) (in English, French, and German)
- Garis, Robert. The Films of Orson Welles. Cambridge University Press, 2004.
- Gear, Matthew Asprey. At the End of the Street in the Shadow: Orson Welles and the City. Wallflower Press/Columbia University Press, 2016.
- Gottesman, Ronald (ed.). Focus on Orson Welles. Englewood Cliffs, New Jersey: Prentice-Hall, 1976.
- Hel-Guedj, Johan-Frederik. Orson Welles, la règle du faux. Michalon, 1997. (in French)
- Higham, Charles. The Films of Orson Welles. Berkeley: University of California Press, 1970.
- Howard, James. The Complete Films of Orson Welles. Citadel Press, 1991.
- McBride, Joseph. Orson Welles. Da Capo Press, 1996. (heavily revised edition of a 1972 monograph)
- _______________. What Ever Happened to Orson Welles? A Portrait of an Independent Career. Kentucky: University Press of Kentucky, 2006.
- Nagel, Elsa. L'Art du Mensonge et de la Vérité: Orson Welles, Le Procès et Une Histoire Immortelle. Paris: L'Harmattan, 1997. (about The Trial, The Immortal Story and F for Fake) (in French)
- Naremore, James. The Magic World of Orson Welles. Urbana, Chicago and Springfield, Illinois: University of Illinois Press, 2015. ISBN 978-0-252-03977-5 (centennial anniversary edition, first published by Oxford University Press in 1978, revised edition published by Southern Methodist University Press in 1989)
- Rasmussen, Randy. Orson Welles: Six Films, Scene by Scene, New York: McFarland, 2006
- Rippy, Marguerite. Orson Welles and the Unfinished RKO Projects: A Postmodern Perspective. Southern Illinois University Press, 2009. ISBN 0-8093-2912-3

=== Studies of Welles's theatre work ===
- Anderegg, Michael. Orson Welles, Shakespeare and Popular Culture. New York: Columbia University Press, 1999.
- France, Richard. The Theatre of Orson Welles. Lewisburg, Pennsylvania: Bucknell University Press, 1977. ISBN 0-8387-1972-4

=== Studies of Welles's radio work ===
- Orson Welles on the air : The radio years, New York Museum of Broadcasting, 1988.
- Cantril, Hadley. The Invasion from Mars: A Study in the Psychology of Panic. Princeton: Princeton University Press, 1940. OCLC 171781
- Gallop, Alan. The Martians are Coming! The true story of Orson Welles' 1938 panic broadcast. Stroud: Amberley Publishing, 2011. ISBN 978-1445602233
- Gosling, John. Waging the War of the Worlds: A history of the 1938 radio broadcast and resulting panic. Jefferson, North Carolina: McFarland, 2009 (including the original script by Howard Koch) ISBN 978-0786441051
- Heyer, Paul. The Medium and the Magician: Orson Welles, the Radio Years. Ottawa: Rowman & Littlefield, 2005. ISBN 0-7425-3797-8
- Koch, Howard. The Panic Broadcast: The whole story of Orson Welles ' legendary radio show invasion from Mars. New York: Avon, 1970.
- Schwartz, A. Brad. Broadcast Hysteria: Orson Welles's War of the Worlds and the Art of Fake News. New York: Hill & Wang, 2015. ISBN 0809031612

=== Memoirs prominently featuring Welles ===
- Anderson, Arthur, An Actor's Odyssey: Orson Welles to Lucky the Leprechaun. Albany: BearManor Media, 2010. ISBN 1-59393-522-6.
- Baxter, Keith, My sentiments Exactly, Oberon Books, 1998.
- Bond, Dorian. Me and Orson Welles: Travelling Europe with a Hollywood Legend. The History press, 2018.
- Castle, William, Step Right Up! I'm Gonna Scare the Pants Off America: Memoirs of a B-Movie Mogul. New York: Putnam, 1992. ISBN 0-88687-657-5
- Cotten, Joseph, Vanity will get you somewhere. San Francisco: Mercury House, 1987. ISBN 978-0595091331
- Everett, Rupert, Red carpets and other bananas skins. Abacus, 2007. ISBN 978-0349120584
- Feder, Chris Welles. In My Father's Shadow: A Daughter Remembers Orson Welles. Algonquin Books of Chapel Hill, 2009. ISBN 978-1-56512-599-5
- Graver, Gary, with Rausch, Andrew J. Making Movies with Orson Welles; A Memoir. Lanham, Maryland: Scarecrow Press, 2008. ISBN 0-8108-6140-2
- Heston, Charlton. In the Arena: An Autobiography. Simon & Schuster, 1995.
- Gómez, Andrés Vicente. El Sueño Loco [A Crazy Dream] (Ayuntamiento de Malaga, Malaga, 2001).(in Spanish)
- Hill, Roger. One man's time and chance: A memoir of eighty years 1895-1975. Woodstock public library, 1977.
- Holiday, Billie with Dufty, William, Lady Sings the Blues. New York: Doubleday, 1956.
- Houseman, John. Run Through: A Memoir. New York: Simon & Schuster, 1972. ISBN 0-671-21034-3
- _______________. Front and Center: A Memoir. New York: Simon & Schuster, 1979. ISBN 0-671-24328-4
- _______________. Final Dress: A Memoir. New York: Simon & Schuster, 1983.
- _______________. Unfinished Business: A Memoir, London: Chatto & Windus, 1986.
- Huston, John. An Open Book. New York, Alfred A. Knopf, 1980. ISBN 9780394404653
- Lindsay-Hogg, Michael. Luck and Circumstance: A Coming of Age in Hollywood, New York and Points Beyond. New York: Alfred A. Knopf, 2011. ISBN 978-0-307-59468-6
- McCambridge, Mercedes. The Quality of Mercy: An autobiography. New York: Time Books, 1981. ISBN 978-0812909456
- Mac Liammóir, Micháel. All for Hecuba: An Irish Theatrical Biography. Dublin: Branden Books, 1967.
- Tasca di Cuto, Alessandro. 'Un Principe in America''. Sellerio Editore, 2004.ISBN 8876811508; English translation, as ''A Prince in America'''. 2011. ISBN 9781465945648

=== Other ===
- Orson Welles, Cahiers du cinéma, Éditions de l'Étoile, 1986. (in French)
- Anile, Alberto, Orson Welles in Italy. Bloomington: Indiana University Press, 2013. (English translation of book first published in Italian in 2006)
- Beja, Morris, ed. Perspectives on Orson Welles. G. K. Hall, 1995.
- Berg, Chuck and Erskine, Tom (ed.). The Encyclopedia of Orson Welles. Checkmark Books, 2003.
- Berthomé, Jean-Pierre and Thomas, François. Orson Welles at Work. London: Phaidon, 2008. (English translation of book first published in French in 2006)
- Berthomé, Jean-Pierre and Thomas, François. Leur Orson Welles : Grands entretiens. Les impressions nouvelles, 2025 (in French)
- Bonnaud, Frédéric, (ed.). My Name is Orson Welles, éditions de la Table Ronde, 2025 (in French)
- Ciment, Michel. "Les Enfants Terribles" in American Film, December 1984. (in French)
- Cobos, Juan. Orson Welles: España como obsesión, Editiones de la Filmoteca, Institut de Valencià de Cultura, España, 1993. (in Spanish)
- Conrad, Peter. Orson Welles: The Stories of His Life. London: Faber and Faber, 2003.
- D'Angela, Toni (ed.). Nelle terre di Orson Welles. Alessandria: Edizioni Falsopiano, 2004.
- Davies, Anthony. Filming Shakespeare's Plays. Cambridge University Press, 1988.
- Drazin, Charles. In Search of the Third Man. Limelight, 2000.
- Duncan, Paul. Orson Welles: Pocket Essentials. London: Pocket Books, 2000.
- Gilmore, James N. and Gottlieb, Sidney (ed.). Orson Welles in focus: Texts and contexts. Indiana university bloomington, 2018.
- Gosling, John. "Waging the War of the Worlds". McFarland & Company, Inc, 2009.
- Greene, Graham. The Third Man. London: Faber and Faber, 1991.
- Hormiga, Gustavo (2002). "Orsonwelles, a new genus of giant linyphiid spiders (Araneae) from the Hawaiian Islands". Invertebrate Systematics 16: 369–448.
- Ishaghpour, Youssef. Orson Welles, cinéaste, une caméra visible, éditions de la différence, 2001. (Three volumes) (in French) :
  - Volume 1 : Mais notre dépendance à l'image est énorme..., 2001.
  - Volume 2 : Les films de la période américaine, 2001.
  - Volume 3 : Les Films de la période nomade, 2001.
- Jorgens, Jack J. Shakespeare on Film. Bloomington: Indiana University Press, 1977.
- Kroll, Robert. Orson Welles' Commercial Break, BearManor Media, 2026.
- Müller, Adalberto, Orson Welles: Banda de um homem Só. Azouge, 2015. (in Portuguese)
- Naremore, James. "The Trial, the FBI Vs Orson Welles" in Film comment, vol. 27, n° 1, 22–27, 1991 (about FBI files on Welles)
- Riambau, Esteve. Orson Welles: Un España immortal, Editiones de la Filmoteca, Institut de Valencià de Cultura, España, 1993. (in Spanish)
- Ramón, David. La Santa de Orson Welles, D.R. Universidad Nacional Autonoma de México, 1991. (in Spanish)
- Rosenbaum, Jonathan. "Orson Welles's Essay Films and Documentary Fictions", in Placing Movies. Berkeley: University of California Press, 1995.
- _____________________. "The Battle Over Orson Welles", in Essential Cinema. Baltimore: Johns Hopkins University Press, 2004.
- _____________________. "Orson Welles as Ideological Challenge" in Movie Wars. A Capella Books, 2000.
- _____________________. Discovering Orson Welles. Berkeley: University of California Press, 2007. ISBN 0-520-25123-7
- Shakespeare Bulletin, Volume 23, Number 1, Spring 2005: Special Welles issue.
- Simon, William G., (ed.). "Special Welles issue", in: Persistence of Vision: The Journal of the Film Faculty of the City University of New York; Number 7, 1989.
- Simonson, Robert. "Orson's Shadow Talkback Series Continues May 4 with Welles's Daughter." May 3, 2005.
- Taylor, John Russell. Orson Welles: a Celebration. Pavilion, 1986.
- ___________________. Orson Welles. Pavilion, 1998.
- Thomas, François. "Orson Welles et le remodelage du texte shakespearien" in Actes des congrès de la Société française Shakespeare 16 | 1998, 171-182 (in French)
- Tonguette, Peter Prescott. Orson Welles Remembered: Interviews With His Actors, Editors, Cinematographers and Magicians. New York: McFarland, 2007. ISBN 978-0-7864-2760-4
- Trias, Jean-Phillipe. Après Welles. Imitations et influences, Mimesis, 2021 (in French)
- Walters, Ben. Welles. London: Haus Publishing, 2004. ISBN 978-1-904341-80-2
- Whaley, Barton. Orson Welles: The Man Who Was Magic, Lybrary.com, 2005. ASIN B005HEHQ7E
- White, Rob. The Third Man. London: BFI, 2003.
- Wood, Bret. Orson Welles: a Bio-Bibliography. Westport, Connecticut: Greenwood Press, 1990. ISBN 0-313-26538-0

== Written fiction featuring Welles as a character ==
=== Graphic novels ===
- Camus, David and Abadzis, Nick. The Cigar That Fell In Love With a Pipe: Featuring Orson Welles & Rita Hayworth. SelfMadeHero, New York, 2014.
- Daoudi, Youssef. The Giant: Orson Welles, The Artist and the Shadow. Macmillan, London, 2025.
- Lawson, Milton and Whalen, Erik. Orson Welles: Warrior of the Worlds. Scout Comics, New York, 2022.

=== Novellas ===
- Newman, Kim. Anno Dracula: The Other Side of Midnight. London, 2000. (subsequently integrated into Newman's 2013 novel Johnny Alucard, in a rewritten form)

=== Novels ===
- Brown, Robert Dwight. Orson Welles' Lost War of the Worlds Screenplay. New York: Allonymous Books, 2013.
- Chabon, Michael The Amazing Adventures of Kavalier & Clay. New York: Random House, 2000.
- Charyn, Jerome, Big red : A novel starring Rita Hayworth Orson Welles, No Exit Press, 2022.
- De Lucovitch, Jean-Pierre, L'assassinat d'Orson Welles, éditions du rocher, 2019. (in French)
- Ferrario, Davide. Dissolvenza al nero (Fade to Black). Rome, 1994.
- Kaplow, Robert. Me and Orson Welles. San Francisco: MacAdam/Cage, 2003. ISBN 1-931561-49-4
- Newman, Kim. Anno Dracula: Dracula Cha Cha Cha. Avon Books, London, 1998.
- _____________. Anno Dracula: Johnny Alucard. Titan, London, 2013.

=== Operas ===
- Hagen, Daron Orson Rehearsed. (Unpublished, though libretto included with 2021 CD release) 2018.

=== Plays ===
- Crider, Amy. Wells and Welles. Theatrical Rights Worldwide, New York, 2025.
- Druxman, Michael B. Orson Welles: A One-Person Play in Two Acts. Createspace, New York, 2011.
- France, Richard. Obediently Yours, Orson Welles. Oberon Books, 2011
- Pendleton, Austin. Orson's Shadow. Dramatists Play Service, New York, 2006.
- Pettigrew, Joel. Mercury Man: The Last Performance of Orson Welles. (Unpublished) 2018.
- Wollman, Chris. The Sacred Beasts. (Unpublished) 2017.
