= Paola Mori =

Italian actress and aristocrat (1928–1986)

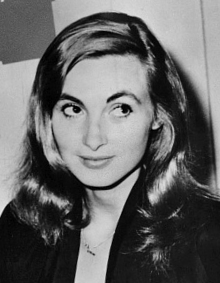
- Mori in May 1955
- Born: Paola di Gerfalco, Contessa di Gerfalco; 18 September 1928; Kingdom of Italy
- Died: 12 August 1986 (aged 57); Las Vegas, Nevada, U.S.
- Occupation: Actress
- Years active: 1953–1964
- Spouse: Orson Welles (m. 1955; died 1985)
- Children: Beatrice Welles

Paola di Gerfalco, Contessa di Gerfalco (18 September 1928 – 12 August 1986), better known by her professional name Paola Mori, was an Italian actress and aristocrat, and the third and last wife of Orson Welles.

== Biography ==
Paola Mori was born in 1928 to an Italian aristocratic family. During World War II, she spent eight months in a concentration camp. Her father, a colonel in the Italian army under King Victor Emmanuel III, was a member of the anti-Mussolini resistance.

By 1953, she had begun carving out a career for herself as a film actress, playing supporting roles in several Italian films.

In 1953, Mori met Orson Welles, and he cast her as the female lead of his film Mr. Arkadin (1955). Mori's voice was dubbed by Billie Whitelaw to conceal her Italian accent.

The couple embarked on a passionate affair, and married at her parents' insistence. The couple's wedding ceremony was held in London on 8 May 1955, and their daughter, Beatrice Welles, was born in New York on 13 November 1955.

Mori and Welles were interviewed by journalist Edward R. Murrow for the CBS television program Person to Person, which aired in November 1955.

Following her marriage, Mori acted in only a handful of projects, all directed by her husband, and then withdrew from acting altogether.

She assisted Welles with The Trial by picking the musical score and appearing in a bit part. Mori scouted locations for Chimes at Midnight and Don Quixote. She also helped with costume designs for Chimes at Midnight. The film's co-star, Keith Baxter, discussed Mori's involvement with Chimes at Midnight in his 2002 memoir, My Sentiments Exactly, her sparkling personality and relationship with her husband. He described Mori as the best influence on Welles's life.

Much of Welles's 1968 film The Immortal Story was shot in the couple's home, located outside of Madrid, Spain.

Mori and Welles moved from Europe to Sedona, Arizona, in 1976. They lived there for two years before purchasing a home in Las Vegas. The move to Las Vegas provided easier access to an airport for Welles.

Her friend, Las Vegas Sun columnist Muriel Stevens said of Mori: "Paola was a rarity – elegant, dignified, without any pretense or airs. Her life had been privileged and glamorous. but simplicity was her style. She remained unimpressed by her aristocratic background. It was simply what was. She was an accomplished needleworker. Her gifts were always handmade treasures. And when Orson was home, she cooked wonderful foods for him. She scoured the city for delicacies. It pleased her to make him comfortable and happy. I'd never met a celebrity wife like her."

Gary Graver, Welles's cameraman for the last fifteen years of his life, wrote in a book co-authored with film historian Andrew J. Rausch that "the couple was estranged from the mid-1960s through [to] Welles's death in 1985." However, his description is at odds with accounts given by Stevens, Beatrice Welles, who says her mother provided a loving, stable home during much of the couple's thirty-year marriage; Welles' close friend, film-maker Juan Cobos; and Baxter, as well as personal correspondence from Mori archived at the Museo Nazionale del Cinema's Bibliomediateca in Turin, Italy.

Mori was seated next to her husband when he was honored with the American Film Institute Life Achievement Award in February 1975.

In the early 1980s, Welles divided his time between his Las Vegas home with Mori and their daughter, and a Los Angeles home he shared with Oja Kodar, a Croatian actress he had begun an on-and off-again relationship with in the 1960s and 1970s. When Mori found out about Kodar in 1984, she threw Welles out of their Nevada house, and neither Mori nor Beatrice Welles saw him for much of the last year of his life, although they still talked regularly on the telephone. Beatrice stated: "They sort of separated toward the end because he had a girlfriend. My mother found out about it, and he denied it. She told him he could come back home as soon as he stopped lying to her. He didn't come home during that last year of his life, but he and my mother talked on the phone every day."

In his will, Welles bequeathed the bulk of his estate to Mori, though he left Kodar his Los Angeles home and the rights to many of his unfinished films. His widow questioned several deals signed by Welles in his final weeks that greatly benefited Kodar and had not been reviewed by his lawyer. A year after Welles' death, a settlement was reached. However, Mori died in a car accident before it was signed. Mori's portion of the estate was inherited by Beatrice, who finalized the agreement in December 1986.

== Death ==
Mori was in an automobile accident in Las Vegas on 12 August 1986, when a car driven by a family friend pulled into cross traffic and was broadsided. She died from head injuries at Desert Springs Hospital in Las Vegas several hours later at the age of 57. Her ashes were buried in Rome.

== Filmography ==
- Finishing School (1953)
- Le marchand de Venise (1953)
- Eager to Live (1953)...Lisey
- Il maestro di Don Giovanni (1954)...Tomasina
- Mr. Arkadin (1955) [dir. Orson Welles]...Raina Arkadin
- Portrait of Gina (1958) [dir. Orson Welles]...Herself
- Don Quixote (1957–69) [dir. Orson Welles]...Girl on a motorcycle
- The Trial (1962) [dir. Orson Welles]...Court archivist
- In the Land of Don Quixote (1964) [dir. Orson Welles]...Herself [filmed in 1961]
- Don Quijote de Orson Welles (1992) [dir. Orson Welles and Jesus Franco]...Girl on a motorcycle [filmed in early 1960s]
