= Legacy of Citizen Kane =

Impact of 1941 drama film by Orson Welles

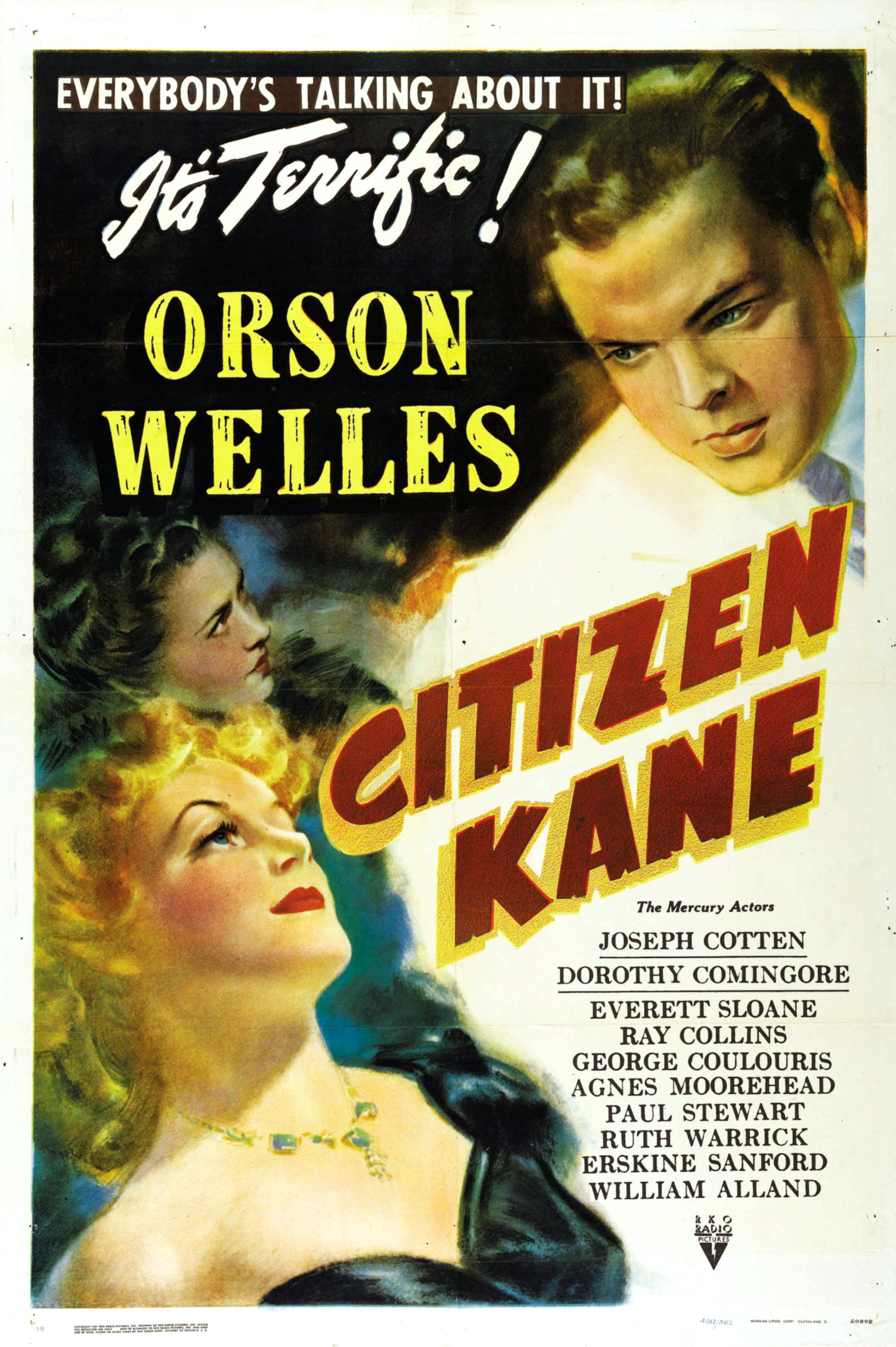
Theatrical release poster (Style B) by William Rose

Citizen Kane is a 1941 American drama film directed by, produced by, and starring Orson Welles. Welles and Herman J. Mankiewicz wrote the screenplay. Citizen Kane is frequently cited as the greatest film ever made.

Citizen Kane was the only film made under Welles's original contract with RKO Pictures, which gave him complete creative control. Welles's new business manager and attorney permitted the contract to lapse. In July 1941, Welles reluctantly signed a new and less favorable deal with RKO under which he produced and directed The Magnificent Ambersons (1942), produced Journey into Fear (1943), and began It's All True, a film he agreed to do without payment. In the new contract Welles was an employee of the studio and lost the right to final cut, which later allowed RKO to modify and re-cut The Magnificent Ambersons over his objections. In June 1942, Schaefer resigned the presidency of RKO Pictures and Welles's contract was terminated by his successor.

The European release of Citizen Kane was delayed until after World War II, premiering in Paris in 1946. Initial reception by French critics was influenced by negative views from Jean-Paul Sartre and Georges Sadoul, who criticized Hollywood's cultural sophistication and the film's nostalgic use of flashbacks. However, critic André Bazin delivered a transformative speech in 1946 that shifted public opinion. Bazin praised the film for its innovative use of mise-en-scène and deep focus cinematography, advocating for a filmic realism that allows audiences to engage more actively with the narrative. Bazin's essays, especially "The Technique of Citizen Kane," argued that the film revolutionized film language and aesthetics.

In the United States, the film was initially neglected until it began appearing on television in the 1950s and was later re-released in theaters. American film critic Andrew Sarris helped revive its reputation, describing it as a profoundly influential American film. Over the decades, Citizen Kane has consistently ranked highly in critical surveys and polls and is often cited as the greatest film ever made.

== Release in Europe ==
During World War II, Citizen Kane was not seen in most European countries. It was shown in France for the first time on July 10, 1946, at the Marbeuf theater in Paris. (Note: 871,261 admissions) Initially most French film critics were influenced by the negative reviews of Jean-Paul Sartre in 1945 and Georges Sadoul in 1946. At that time many French intellectuals and filmmakers shared Sartre's negative opinion that Hollywood filmmakers were uncultured. Sartre criticized the film's flashbacks for its nostalgic and romantic preoccupation with the past instead of the realities of the present and said that "the whole film is based on a misconception of what cinema is all about. The film is in the past tense, whereas we all know that cinema has got to be in the present tense."

André Bazin, a then little-known film critic working for Sartre's Les Temps modernes, was asked to give an impromptu speech about the film after a screening at the Colisée Theatre in the autumn of 1946 and changed the opinion of much of the audience. This speech led to Bazin's 1947 article "The Technique of Citizen Kane", which directly influenced public opinion about the film. Carringer wrote that Bazin was "the one who did the most to enhance the film's reputation." (Note: Bordwell has hypothesized that Bazin was influenced by publicity about the film's innovations that were published in France during its first release. These included interviews by Welles and the publication of Toland's article "The Motion Picture Cameraman" in the January 1947 issue of La Revue du Cinéma. Bordwell believes that Bazin was aware of the legend of film's innovations before having seen it.) Both Bazin's critique of the film and his theories about cinema itself centered around his strong belief in mise-en-scène. These theories were diametrically opposed to both the popular Soviet montage theory and the politically Marxist and anti-Hollywood beliefs of most French film critics at that time. Bazin believed that a film should depict reality without the filmmaker imposing their "will" on the spectator, which the Soviet theory supported. Bazin wrote that Citizen Kane's mise-en-scène created a "new conception of filmmaking" and that the freedom given to the audience from the deep focus shots was innovative by changing the entire concept of the cinematic image. Bazin wrote extensively about the mise-en-scène in the scene where Susan Alexander attempts suicide, which was one long take while other films would have used four or five shots in the scene. Bazin wrote that the film's mise-en-scène "forces the spectator to participate in the meaning of the film" and creates "a psychological realism which brings the spectator back to the real conditions of perception."

In his 1950 essay "The Evolution of the Language of Cinema", Bazin placed Citizen Kane center stage as a work which ushered in a new period in cinema. One of the first critics to defend motion pictures as being on the same artistic level as literature or painting, Bazin often used the film as an example of cinema as an art form and wrote that "Welles has given the cinema a theoretical restoration. He has enriched his filmic repertory with new or forgotten effects that, in today's artistic context, take on a significance we didn't know they could have." Bazin also compared the film to Roberto Rossellini's Paisan for having "the same aesthetic concept of realism" and to the films of William Wyler shot by Toland (such as The Little Foxes and The Best Years of Our Lives), all of which used deep focus cinematography that Bazin called "a dialectical step forward in film language."

Bazin's praise of the film went beyond film theory and reflected his own philosophy towards life itself. His metaphysical interpretations about the film reflected humankind's place in the universe. Bazin believed that the film examined one person's identity and search for meaning. It portrayed the world as ambiguous and full of contradictions, whereas films up until then simply portrayed people's actions and motivations. Bazin's biographer Dudley Andrew wrote that:

The world of Citizen Kane, that mysterious, dark, and infinitely deep world of space and memory where voices trail off into distant echoes and where meaning dissolves into interpretation, seemed to Bazin to mark the starting point from which all of us try to construct provisionally the sense of our lives.

Bazin went on to co-found Cahiers du cinéma, whose contributors (including future film directors François Truffaut and Jean-Luc Godard) also praised the film. The popularity of Truffaut's auteur theory helped the film's and Welles's reputation.

== Re-evaluation ==
By 1942 Citizen Kane had run its course theatrically and, apart from a few showings at big city arthouse cinemas, it largely vanished and both the film's and Welles's reputation fell among American critics. In 1949 critic Richard Griffith in his overview of cinema, The Film Till Now, dismissed Citizen Kane as "... tinpot if not crackpot Freud."

In the United States, it was neglected and forgotten until its revival on television in the mid-to-late 1950s. Three key events in 1956 led to its re-evaluation in the United States: first, RKO was one of the first studios to sell its library to television, and early that year Citizen Kane started to appear on television; second, the film was re-released theatrically to coincide with Welles's return to the New York stage, where he played Shakespeare King Lear; and third, American film critic Andrew Sarris wrote "Citizen Kane: The American Baroque" for Film Culture, and described it as "the great American film" and "the work that influenced the cinema more profoundly than any American film since The Birth of a Nation." Carringer considers Sarris's essay as the most important influence on the film's reputation in the US.

During Expo 58, a poll of over 100 film historians named Kane one of the top ten greatest films ever made (the group gave first-place honors to Battleship Potemkin). When a group of young film directors announced their vote for the top six, they were booed for not including the film.

In the decades since, its critical status as one of the greatest films ever made has grown, with numerous essays and books on it including Peter Cowie's The Cinema of Orson Welles, Ronald Gottesman's Focus on Citizen Kane, a collection of significant reviews and background pieces, and most notably Kael's essay, "Raising Kane", which promoted the value of the film to a much wider audience than it had reached before. Despite its criticism of Welles, it further popularized the notion of Citizen Kane as the great American film. The rise of art house and film society circuits also aided in the film's rediscovery. David Thomson said that the film 'grows with every year as America comes to resemble it."

The British magazine Sight & Sound has produced a Top Ten list surveying film critics every decade since 1952, and is regarded as one of the most respected barometers of critical taste. Citizen Kane was a runner up to the top 10 in its 1952 poll but was voted as the greatest film ever made in its 1962 poll, retaining the top spot in every subsequent poll until 2012, when Vertigo displaced it.

The film has also ranked number one in the following film "best of" lists: Julio Castedo's The 100 Best Films of the Century, Cahiers du cinéma's 100 films pour une cinémathèque idéale, Kinovedcheskie Zapiski, Time Out magazine's Top 100 Films (Centenary), The Village Voice's 100 Greatest Films, and The Royal Belgian Film Archive's Most Important and Misappreciated American Films.

Roger Ebert called Citizen Kane the greatest film ever made: "But people don't always ask about the greatest film. They ask, 'What's your favorite movie?' Again, I always answer with Citizen Kane."

In 1998, Time Out conducted a reader's poll and Citizen Kane was voted 3rd best film of all time. On February 18, 1999, the United States Postal Service honored Citizen Kane by including it in its Celebrate the Century series. The film was honored again on February 25, 2003, in a series of U.S. postage stamps marking the 75th anniversary of the Academy of Motion Picture Arts and Sciences. Art director Perry Ferguson represents the behind-the-scenes craftsmen of filmmaking in the series; he is depicted completing a sketch for Citizen Kane.

Citizen Kane was ranked number one in the American Film Institute's polls of film industry artists and leaders in 1998 and 2007. "Rosebud" was chosen as the 17th most memorable movie quotation in a 2005 AFI poll. The film's score was one of 250 nominees for the top 25 film scores in American cinema in another 2005 AFI poll. In 2005 the film was included on Time's All-Time 100 best movies list.

In 2012, the Motion Picture Editors Guild published a list of the 75 best-edited films of all time based on a survey of its membership. Citizen Kane was listed second. In 2015, Citizen Kane ranked 1st on BBC's "100 Greatest American Films" list, voted on by film critics from around the world.

== Influence ==
Citizen Kane has been called the most influential film of all time. Richard Corliss has asserted that Jules Dassin's 1941 film The Tell-Tale Heart was the first example of its influence and the first pop culture reference to the film occurred later in 1941 when the spoof comedy Hellzapoppin' featured a "Rosebud" sled. (Note: Another early pop culture reference occurred in Welles's The Magnificent Ambersons, which includes a brief glimpse of a newspaper article written by "Jed Leland".) The film's cinematography was almost immediately influential and in 1942 American Cinematographer wrote "without a doubt the most immediately noticeable trend in cinematography methods during the year was the trend toward crisper definition and increased depth of field."

The cinematography influenced John Huston's The Maltese Falcon. Cinematographer Arthur Edeson used a wider-angle lens than Toland and the film includes many long takes, low angles and shots of the ceiling, but it did not use deep focus shots on large sets to the extent that Citizen Kane did. Edeson and Toland are often credited together for revolutionizing cinematography in 1941. Toland's cinematography influenced his own work on The Best Years of Our Lives. Other films influenced include Gaslight, Mildred Pierce and Jane Eyre. Cinematographer Kazuo Miyagawa said that his use of deep focus was influenced by "the camera work of Gregg Toland in Citizen Kane" and not by traditional Japanese art.

Its cinematography, lighting, and flashback structure influenced such film noirs of the 1940s and 1950s as The Killers, Keeper of the Flame, Caught, The Great Man and This Gun for Hire. David Bordwell and Kristin Thompson have written that "For over a decade thereafter American films displayed exaggerated foregrounds and somber lighting, enhanced by long takes and exaggerated camera movements." However, by the 1960s filmmakers such as those from the French New Wave and Cinéma vérité movements favored "flatter, more shallow images with softer focus" and Citizen Kane's style became less fashionable. American filmmakers in the 1970s combined these two approaches by using long takes, rapid cutting, deep focus and telephoto shots all at once. Its use of long takes influenced films such as The Asphalt Jungle, and its use of deep focus cinematography influenced Gun Crazy, The Whip Hand, The Devil's General and Justice Is Done. The flashback structure in which different characters have conflicting versions of past events influenced La commare secca and Man of Marble.

The film's structure influenced the biographical films Lawrence of Arabia and Mishima: A Life in Four Chapters—which begin with the subject's death and show their life in flashbacks—as well as Welles's thriller Mr. Arkadin. Rosenbaum sees similarities in the film's plot to Mr. Arkadin, as well as the theme of nostalgia for loss of innocence throughout Welles's career, beginning with Citizen Kane and including The Magnificent Ambersons, Mr. Arkadin and Chimes at Midnight. Rosenbaum also points out how the film influenced Warren Beatty's Reds. The film depicts the life of Jack Reed through the eyes of Louise Bryant, much as Kane's life is seen through the eyes of Thompson and the people who he interviews. Rosenbaum also compared the romantic montage between Reed and Bryant with the breakfast table montage in Citizen Kane.

Akira Kurosawa's Rashomon is often compared to the film due to both having complicated plot structures told by multiple characters in the film. Welles said his initial idea for the film was "Basically, the idea Rashomon used later on," however Kurosawa had not yet seen the film before making Rashomon in 1950. Nigel Andrews has compared the film's complex plot structure to Rashomon, Last Year at Marienbad, Memento and Magnolia. Andrews also compares Charles Foster Kane to Michael Corleone in The Godfather, Jake LaMotta in Raging Bull and Daniel Plainview in There Will Be Blood for their portrayals of "haunted megalomaniac[s], presiding over the shards of [their] own [lives]."

The films of Paul Thomas Anderson have been compared to it. Variety compared There Will Be Blood to the film and called it "one that rivals Giant and Citizen Kane in our popular lore as origin stories about how we came to be the people we are." The Master has been called "movieland's only spiritual sequel to Citizen Kane that doesn't shrivel under the hefty comparison". The Social Network has been compared to the film for its depiction of a media mogul and by the character Erica Albright being similar to "Rosebud". The controversy of the Sony hacking before the release of The Interview brought comparisons of Hearst's attempt to suppress the film. The film's plot structure and some specific shots influenced Todd Haynes's Velvet Goldmine. Abbas Kiarostami's The Traveler has been called "the Citizen Kane of the Iranian children's cinema." The film's use of overlapping dialogue has influenced the films of Robert Altman and Carol Reed. Reed's films Odd Man Out, The Third Man (in which Welles and Cotten appeared) and Outcast of the Islands were also influenced by the film's cinematography.

Many directors have listed it as one of the greatest films ever made, including Woody Allen, Michael Apted, Les Blank, Kenneth Branagh, Paul Greengrass, Satyajit Ray, Michel Hazanavicius, Michael Mann, Sam Mendes, Jiří Menzel, Paul Schrader, Martin Scorsese, Denys Arcand, Gillian Armstrong, John Boorman, Roger Corman, Alex Cox, Miloš Forman, Norman Jewison, Richard Lester, Richard Linklater, Paul Mazursky, Ronald Neame, Sydney Pollack and Stanley Kubrick. Yasujirō Ozu said it was his favorite non-Japanese film and was impressed by its techniques. François Truffaut said that the film "has inspired more vocations to cinema throughout the world than any other" and recognized its influence in The Barefoot Contessa, Les Mauvaises Rencontres, Lola Montès, and 8 1/2. Truffaut's Day for Night pays tribute to the film in a dream sequence depicting a childhood memory of the character played by Truffaut stealing publicity photos from the film. Numerous film directors have cited the film as influential on their own films, including Theo Angelopoulos, Luc Besson, the Coen brothers, Francis Ford Coppola, Brian De Palma, John Frankenheimer, Stephen Frears, Sergio Leone, Michael Mann, Ridley Scott, Martin Scorsese, Bryan Singer and Steven Spielberg. Bollywood film director and producer Vidhu Vinod Chopra expressed his thoughts on Citizen Kane in his book Unscripted: Conversations on Life and Cinema. He said, 'Let's say you are blind and you have never seen a beautiful sunset in your entire life and suddenly you get an eyesight and you see a sunset. Citizen Kane was like that for me. I was blind. Before that, I had mostly seen only Hindi movies'. While I was watching Citizen Kane, I asked myself, "If I died and gone to the heaven of cinema".

Satyajit Ray always regretted not seeing Citizen Kane when it was released in 1941 and screened at the biggest cinema theatre in Calcutta. At that time, he was in Santiniketan, studying Indian arts and history. He eventually watched the film after becoming a film director and admired it greatly.

Ingmar Bergman disliked the film and called it "a total bore. Above all, the performances are worthless. The amount of respect that movie has is absolutely unbelievable!"

William Friedkin said that the film influenced him and called it "a veritable quarry for filmmakers, just as Joyce's Ulysses is a quarry for writers." The film has also influenced other art forms. Carlos Fuentes's novel The Death of Artemio Cruz was partially inspired by the film and the rock band The White Stripes paid unauthorized tribute to the film in the song "The Union Forever".

== Film memorabilia ==
In 1982, film director Steven Spielberg bought a "Rosebud" sled for $60,500; it was one of three balsa sleds used in the closing scenes and the only one that was not burned. Spielberg eventually donated the sled to the Academy Museum of Motion Pictures as he stated he felt it belonged in a museum. After the Spielberg purchase, it was reported that retiree Arthur Bauer claimed to own another "Rosebud" sled. In early 1942, when Bauer was 12, he had won an RKO publicity contest and selected the hardwood sled as his prize. In 1996, Bauer's estate offered the painted pine sled at auction through Christie's. Bauer's son told CBS News that his mother had once wanted to paint the sled and use it as a plant stand, but Bauer told her to "just save it and put it in the closet." The sled was sold to an anonymous bidder for $233,500.

Welles's Oscar for Best Original Screenplay was believed to be lost until it was rediscovered in 1994. It was withdrawn from a 2007 auction at Sotheby's when bidding failed to reach its estimate of $800,000 to $1.2 million. Owned by the charitable Dax Foundation, it was auctioned for $861,542 in 2011 to an anonymous buyer. Mankiewicz's Oscar was sold at least twice, in 1999 and again in 2012, the latest price being $588,455.

In 1989, Mankiewicz's personal copy of the Citizen Kane script was auctioned at Christie's. The leather-bound volume included the final shooting script and a carbon copy of American that bore handwritten annotations—purportedly made by Hearst's lawyers, who were said to have obtained it in the manner described by Kael in "Raising Kane". Estimated to bring $70,000 to $90,000, it sold for a record $231,000.

In 2007, Welles's personal copy of the last revised draft of Citizen Kane before the shooting script was sold at Sotheby's for $97,000. A second draft of the script titled American, marked "Mr. Welles' working copy", was auctioned by Sotheby's in 2014 for $164,692. (Note: The same item had been sold by Christie's in December 1991, together with a working script from The Magnificent Ambersons, for $11,000.) A collection of 24 pages from a working script found in Welles's personal possessions by his daughter Beatrice Welles was auctioned in 2014 for $15,000.

In 2014, a collection of approximately 235 Citizen Kane stills and production photos that had belonged to Welles was sold at auction for $7,812.

In 2025, a red wooden sled marked with the name “Rosebud” was sold at Heritage Auctions for $14.75 million. The artifact is one of the sleds used in the making of the Citizen Kane.
