= Citizen Kane: A Filmmaker's Journey =

2016 book by Harlan Lebo

First edition (publ. Thomas Dunne Books)

Citizen Kane: A Filmmaker's Journey is a 2016 non-fiction book written by Harlan Lebo about the making of Citizen Kane, the motion picture produced, directed, co-written, and starring Orson Welles that is ranked by the American Film Institute as the best motion picture ever made.

== Summary ==
Citizen Kane: A Filmmaker’s Journey describes Welles' rise to prominence, the creative control he received in his first Hollywood contract, studio infighting over the project at RKO Radio Pictures, the pressurized production schedule, the plot by the Hearst Corporation – critical of the similarity between real-life publisher William Randolph Hearst and the character of Charles Foster Kane – to suppress or destroy the film and discredit Welles, and the ascent of Citizen Kane in the rankings of American motion pictures.

The book is notable for using previously unused documents from the Hearst and Welles archives, the University of Michigan, and the Museum of Modern Art (New York), to examine six new topics about the film: Welles' role in writing the screenplay, which was larger than formerly understood; previously unreleased information provided by Welles’ assistant Kathryn (Trosper) Popper, which describes Welles’ struggles with creating the film; (Note: Trosper noted a comment from Welles: "One of the great troubles with the script is that we are showing a man who has failed in his ambitions on his own terms -- showing a technical matter rather than a tangible thing such as being dispossessed. Ten million unemployed cannot sympathize with a man who has lost only by his own standards, and can be presented only as a fact of interest rather than a point of sympathy.") the impact on the production of a previously unexplored script that Welles created after the studio approved a final draft; eyewitness accounts of last-second writing by Welles; new scenes written during production to fix flaws in the story; (Note: The rush of preparing for last-minute shooting can be understood by reviewing the production files for Citizen Kane, in September and October 1940, which show many new budget authorizations for sets and casting that were not part of the original budget, along with daily production reports that report the filming of these scenes only days later. These files are in the UCLA Library Special Collections.) and information about the plans by the Hearst organization to suppress or destroy Citizen Kane and discredit Welles. (Note: Information about the Hearst conspiracy against Citizen Kane is found in the William Randolph Hearst Papers in the Bancroft Library at UC Berkeley. Particularly noteworthy are letters and memos by Richard Berlin, in 1941 the head of Hearst's magazine division and (working with Hearst's personal assistant Joseph Willicombe) the primary staff member responsible for coordinating the attack on the film. Also noteworthy in those files are letters and memos from columnist Louella Parsons, whose active role suppressing Citizen Kane -- including threats to studio and theater chiefs to prevent the film's screening)

== Reception ==
Citizen Kane: A Filmmaker’s Journey received consistently positive reviews, with critics citing the book for its comprehensive narrative, clarifying misconceptions and inaccuracies, and new factual information about the film.

Kirkus Reviews reported, "Citizen Kane: A Filmmaker's Journey is everything you wanted to know about the greatest film of all time – and then some." Although The New York Times review said although the book seemed “quaint” when compared to the biography by Simon Callow on Orson Welles’ middle years that was published the same month, The Times also said that Lebo's book was “The most thorough account yet of the genesis, production, and release of Welles's most famous film. . .it's never been presented this comprehensively.”

== See also ==
- Studies of Citizen Kane
- Screenplay for Citizen Kane
- Sources for Citizen Kane
