= In the Land of Don Quixote =

- Nella terra di Don Chisciotte
- Written by: Gian Paolo Callegari
- Directed by: Orson Welles
- Starring: Orson Welles; Arnoldo Foà (voice); Paola Mori; Beatrice Welles
- Country of origin: Italy
- Original language: Italian
- No. of episodes: 9

Production
- Executive producer: Alessandro Tasca
- Producer: Orson Welles
- Cinematography: Tim Suhrstedt
- Running time: 30 mins each - 9 episodes

Original release
- Release: 1964

Nella terra di Don Chisciotte (English-language title In the Land of Don Quixote) is an Italian-language documentary travelogue series about Spain, made by Orson Welles. It began filming in 1961, but did not air until 1964. The series follows Welles' travels around Spain, and was narrated by Arnoldo Foà. The series was made for Radiotelevisione Italiana (RAI-TV). Co-starring with Welles were his Italian wife Paola Mori, and their young daughter Beatrice Welles.

== Production and filming ==
At the time, Welles was simultaneously working on his film adaptation of Don Quixote, and the series was primarily made to raise funds for the film. Jonathan Rosenbaum describes the series as "a bread-and-butter travelogue made in order to finance work on the Quixote feature." When Welles's unfinished Don Quixote film was released in a much-derided re-edit by Jesús Franco in 1992, it included footage of Welles in Spain that had been taken from In the Land of Don Quixote - even though Welles had never intended any crossover between the two projects, and Rosenbaum considered the resulting effect "lamentable".

Welles was responsible for the filming and editing of the series, but not for the Italian-language narration, which was done by the RAI-TV network after they took the project out of his hands. According to Jonathan Rosenbaum: "'The programs are essentially black-and-white home movies, shot with a cameraman from Spanish TV (an Italian[-speaking] cameraman for the Prado) and an Italian sound person...The version edited by Orson Welles contains no narration, but RAI adds a narration of its own, written by playwright and stage director Gian Paolo Callegari with the assistance of Antonio Navarro Linares and spoken by Arnoldo Foà."

== Episodes ==
The series has nine episodes, titled as follows:

1. "Itinerario Andaluso (Andalusian Itinerary)" - Andalusia, Segovia and Ronda
2. "Spagna Santa (Holy Week in Spain)" - Seville
3. "La Feria de San Fermin (The San Fermin Holidays)" - Pamplona
4. "Lo Encierro di Pamplona (The Running of the Bulls in Pamplona)" - Pamplona
5. "Le Cantine di Jerez (The Caves of Jerez)" - Jerez
6. "Siviglia (Seville)" - Seville
7. "Le Feria di Aprile a Siviglia (April Fair in Seville)" - Seville - This episode was not screened during the original run.
8. "Tempo di Flamenco (Time for Flamenco)" - Barcelona
9. "Roma e Oriente in Spagna (Rome and the Orient in Spain's Past)" - Granada, Toledo, Córdoba, Gibraltar, Seville and Palos

== Restoration ==
The series has been restored by the Munich Film Museum. Welles had no input into the commentary, so the restoration uses the original background music track (which Welles selected), playing it louder, with the commentary removed entirely.

One episode, largely dedicated to Beatrice learning the flamenco, was originally not aired by RAI-TV on the grounds that it was of limited interest, although it has subsequently been restored by the Munich Film Museum.

== Critical reception ==
Welles biographer Clinton Heylin sees the series as a slight effort, writing that the series was "little more than home movies of his trips to Spain." Joseph McBride concurs, stating "the TV episodes never transcend their casual, rambling, touristy approach", likening it to an "indulgent father's home movie".
