= Ash Wednesday (1973 film) =

1973 film by Larry Peerce

- Original poster
- Directed by: Larry Peerce
- Written by: Jean-Claude Tramont
- Produced by: Dominick Dunne
- Starring: Elizabeth Taylor; Helmut Berger; Keith Baxter; Henry Fonda
- Cinematography: Ennio Guarnieri
- Edited by: Marion Rothman
- Music by: Maurice Jarre
- Production company: Sagittarius Productions
- Distributed by: Paramount Pictures
- Release date: November 21, 1973
- Running time: 99 minutes
- Country: United States
- Language: English

Ash Wednesday is a 1973 American drama film directed by Larry Peerce and starring Elizabeth Taylor. It was produced by Dominick Dunne. The screenplay by Jean-Claude Tramont focuses on the effect that extensive cosmetic surgery has on the life of a middle-aged married woman.

== Plot ==
In a desperate attempt to save her faltering marriage, 55-year-old Barbara Sawyer submits to full-body plastic surgery in a Swiss clinic, then checks into an exclusive ski resort, Cortina d'Ampezzo, to await the arrival of her attorney-husband Mark. Reveling in her considerably younger and tauter appearance, she allows playboy Erich to seduce her. When Mark finally arrives, he makes an announcement that changes Barbara's initial plans forever.

== Cast ==
- Elizabeth Taylor as Barbara Sawyer
- Henry Fonda as Mark Sawyer
- Helmut Berger as Erich
- Keith Baxter as David
- Margaret Blye as Barbara's daughter

== Production ==
Producer Dominick Dunne wrote, "There were problems on the picture right from the beginning. We kept getting more and more behind schedule. A lot of us were drinking too much, as was I, and a few were snorting too much, as was I … Elizabeth [Taylor] was chronically late …," sometimes as many as three hours late, but Dunne felt it would be pointless to try to rein in the star. Dunne also alleges that when he was a stage manager in 1950s New York, he had known the screenwriter as a pageboy called Jack Schwartz: "It made for complications on the picture, on top of the complications of being overschedule and overbudget."

== Critical reception ==
The film's critical reception was reasonably favorable, particularly for Taylor, who was nominated for a Golden Globe. Rex Reed's review in The New York Observer amounted to a love letter to Taylor: "She's subtle, sensitive, glowing with freshness and beauty, fifty pounds lighter in weight, her hair is coiffed simply, her clothes ravishing, her make-up a symphony of perfection. For those who grew up in love with Elizabeth Taylor, the movie is pure magic. She is once again the kind of star marquees light up for."

Variety agreed: "Taylor, fashionably gowned and bejeweled carries the film almost single-handedly. Fonda is excellent in his climactic appearance, an unusually superb casting idea. Taylor's performance also is very good, and relative to many of her recent roles, this is one of the strongest and most effective in some time. Her beauty remains sensational."

Vincent Canby of The New York Times added a dissenting voice, saying the film "was directed by Larry Peerce...and written by Jean-Claude Tramont with all the fearlessness and perception demanded in the boiling of an egg."

Roger Dooley of The Village Voice disagreed, thinking the film contained "Elizabeth Taylor's best role in years...Jean-Claude Tramont's screenplay, directed by Larry Peerce, makes one remember why millions of people used to enjoy movies."

In a critique that spoils the plot, Roger Ebert of the Chicago Sun-Times wrote, "The movie's story is not really very interesting, but we're intrigued because the star is Taylor. She's 40 or 41 now, and yet she looks great. There's a kind of voyeuristic sensuality in watching her look at herself in the mirror (which she spends no end of time doing)...Maybe the fundamental problem with the movie is that we can't quite believe any man would leave Elizabeth Taylor. It's a good thing we never see Henry Fonda's bimbo, because if we did, we wouldn't be convinced."

The National Organization for Women gave the film a "Discarded Older Woman" award during "its annual putdown of male chauvinism" in the media on Women's Equality Day in 1974.

== Awards and nominations ==
Elizabeth Taylor was nominated for the Golden Globe Award for Best Actress – Motion Picture Drama.

== See also ==
- List of American films of 1973
