= Les Bravades =

Posthumous picture book by Orson Welles

- First edition cover
- Author: Orson Welles
- Original title: A portfolio of pictures made for Rebecca Welles by her father, Christmas 1956
- Cover artist: Orson Welles
- Language: English
- Genre: Picture book
- Publisher: Workman Publishing Company
- Publication date: November 1996
- Publication place: United States
- Media type: Print (Hardcover)
- Pages: 72 pp. (first edition)
- ISBN: 0761105956

Les Bravades is a 68-page picture book by Orson Welles, written and drawn in 1956, and published posthumously in 1996. The title is that of the publisher; the original manuscript carries the title, A portfolio of pictures made for Rebecca Welles by her father, Christmas 1956.

== Subject ==
The book was created by Welles when he was staying in Saint-Tropez, France, during Les Bravades des Espagnols, the annual festival of June 15 celebrating a local victory over the Spanish fleet in 1637. The festival features a procession in which a bust of the saint after whom the town is named, Saint Torpes, is carried around.

Welles wrote in the book, 'I've seen lots of "fetes", "fiestas", and festivals, every sort and variety of saints-day high-jinks all over the world. I've been to such events in Sicilly [sic] and China, in southern Spain and Italy and on the Alti-Plano of Bolivia. But never anything to equal the "Bravades" of St. Tropez.' In it, he wrote to his daughter, 'I was lucky enough to be in St. Tropez during this holiday; and because I kept thinking of you, and wishing you could be seeing it too, I've prepared this little picture book to give you an idea of what it was like.'

The book tells of the procession and customs during this festival, and in particular it describes the town's uniformed guards, "Les Bravadeurs", who carry a statue of Saint Torpes around the town.

== Publication ==
The book was not intended for publication. Welles made it as a private gift for Rebecca, his 12-year-old daughter from his marriage to Rita Hayworth.

In the 1990s, Rebecca Welles auctioned off the book, and the buyer had the full manuscript published as a picture book in November 1996 by Workman Publishing, with an afterword by Welles biographer Simon Callow.
