= Don Quixote (unfinished film) =

- Directed by: Orson Welles
- Screenplay by: Orson Welles
- Based on: Don Quixote by Miguel de Cervantes
- Produced by: Orson Welles; Oscar Dancigers
- Starring: Francisco Reiguera; Akim Tamiroff; Patty McCormack; Orson Welles
- Cinematography: Jack Draper (principal cinematographer); Jose Garcia Galisteo; Juan Manuel de Lachica; Edmond Richard; Ricardo Navarrete; Manuel Mateos; Giorgio Tonti; Gary Graver
- Edited by: Orson Welles; Mauro Bonanni; Maurizio Lucidi; Renzo Lucidi; Peter Parasheles; Ira Wohl; Alberto Valenzuela
- Running time: 116 minutes
- Countries: Spain; Italy; United States
- Language: English (dubbed)

Don Quixote is an unfinished film project written, co-produced and directed by Orson Welles. Principal photography took place between 1957 and 1969. Test footage was filmed as early as 1955, second-unit photography was done as late as 1972, and Welles was working on the film intermittently until his death in 1985. The film was eventually edited by Jesús Franco and was released in 1992, to mixed reviews.

== Origin ==
Don Quixote was initially conceived in 1955 as a 30-minute film for CBS entitled Don Quixote Passes By. Rather than offer a literal adaptation of the Miguel de Cervantes novel, Welles opted to bring the characters of Don Quixote and Sancho Panza into the modern age as living anachronisms. Welles explained his idea in an interview, stating: "My Don Quixote and Sancho Panza are exactly and traditionally drawn from Cervantes, but are nonetheless contemporary." Welles later elaborated to Peter Bogdanovich: "What interests me is the idea of these dated old virtues. And why they still seem to speak to us when, by all logic, they're so hopelessly irrelevant. That's why I've been obsessed for so long with Don Quixote ... [The character] can't ever be contemporary—that's really the idea. He never was. But he's alive somehow, and he's riding through Spain even now ... The anachronism of Don Quixote's knightly armor in what was Cervantes' own modern time doesn't show up very sharply now. I've simply translated the anachronism. My film demonstrates that he and Sancho Panza are eternal."

Welles shot color test footage in the Bois de Boulogne with Russian-born American actor Mischa Auer as Don Quixote and Russian character actor Akim Tamiroff as Sancho Panza. Auer had previously acted in Welles's Mr. Arkadin. Tamiroff had first worked with Welles on Black Magic and had appeared in Welles's film Mr. Arkadin; he would appear in his later films Touch of Evil and The Trial. It was the first time Welles had filmed in color since the ill-fated production of It's All True in 1942. However, when representatives from CBS viewed unedited footage they were unhappy with Welles's concept and cancelled the project. The original color test shots with Auer were lost and are no longer believed to exist.

Welles decided to expand the production into a black-and-white feature film. Welles's longtime friend Frank Sinatra invested $25,000 in the new film, with Welles providing additional self-funding derived from his work as an actor.

== Production ==
On June 29, 1957, after having been removed from his own film Touch of Evil, Welles headed to Mexico City to begin work on the feature-length version of Don Quixote. The part of Don Quixote had been offered to Charlton Heston, who had just finished filming Touch of Evil with Welles, and Heston was keen on playing the role, but was only available for two weeks, which Welles feared would be insufficient. Spanish actor Francisco Reiguera was cast as Don Quixote and Akim Tamiroff remained as Sancho Panza. Welles also brought in child actress Patty McCormack to play Dulcie, an American girl visiting Mexico City as the city's central framing device. During her visit, Dulcie would encounter Welles (playing himself) in a hotel lobby, on the hotel patio and in a horse-drawn carriage, and he would tell her the story of Don Quixote. She would then meet Don Quixote and Sancho Panza in the present day, and would later tell Welles of her adventures with them.

Welles worked without a finished script, shooting improvised sequences on the street. Much of the footage was shot with silent 16 mm equipment, with Welles planning to dub the dialogue at a later date. As the production evolved, Welles told film critic André Bazin that he saw his Don Quixote being created in the improvisational style of silent comedy films. The bulk of filming occurred in Mexico in two blocks in late 1957. The first was between early July 1957 and his return to Hollywood on 28 August, while the second was in September and October 1957. Filming in Mexico occurred in Puebla, Tepoztlán, Texcoco and Río Frio.

However, Welles's production was forced to stop due to problems with financing. At this stage the project was supervised by Mexican producer Oscar Dancigers, and after Welles went over budget by some $5,000, Dancigers suspended filming, before pulling out of the project entirely. Thereafter, Welles produced the film himself. Welles became preoccupied with other projects, including attempts to salvage Touch of Evil. In a bid to raise more funds, Welles threw himself into money-making assignments, acting in films including The Long, Hot Summer, Compulsion and Ferry to Hong Kong, narrating films including The Vikings and King of Kings, and directing the stage plays Five Kings and Rhinoceros. When money was available, he switched the location shooting to Spain. As time went by, McCormack matured out of childhood, forcing Welles to drop her character from the film. In later years, he stated that he wished to re-film her scenes, plus some new ones, with his daughter Beatrice Welles (who had a small part in his Chimes at Midnight). However, he never did so, and by the late 1960s Beatrice also grew out of childhood.

During the 1960s, Welles shot fragments of Don Quixote in Spain (Pamplona, Málaga and Seville) and Italy (Rome, Manziana and Civitavecchia) as his schedule and finances allowed; he even found time to film sequences (reported as being "the prologue and epilogue") while on vacation in Málaga commuting all the while to Paris to oversee the post-production work on his 1962 adaptation of The Trial. Welles continued to show Don Quixote and Sancho Panza in the present day, where they react with bafflement at such inventions as motor scooters, airplanes, automobiles, radio, television, cinema screens and missiles. Welles never filmed a literal version of the famous scene in which Quixote duels with windmills, he instead made a modern-day version of it in which Quixote walks into a cinema. Sancho Panza and Patty McCormack's character are seated in the audience, watching the screen in silent amazement. A battle scene plays onscreen, and Quixote mistakes this for the real thing, trying to do battle with the screen and tearing it to pieces with his sword.

The production became so prolonged that Reiguera, who was seriously ailing by the end of the 1960s, asked Welles to finish shooting his scenes before his health gave out. Welles was able to complete the scenes involving Reiguera prior to the actor's death in 1969. However, as Welles shot most of the footage silently, he seldom filmed the original actors' dialogue. He intended to dub the voices himself (as he did on many of his films, including Macbeth, Othello, The Trial and The Deep), combining his narration with his voicing all the characters, but only ever did so for some limited portions of the film.

== Cast ==
- Francisco Reiguera as Don Quixote
- Akim Tamiroff as Sancho Panza
- Patty McCormack as Dulcie
- Orson Welles as himself/narrator

== Changing concept ==
Although principal photography ended after Reiguera's death, Welles never brought forth a completed version of the film. As the years passed, he insisted that he was keen to complete the film, but it is clear that the concept changed several times. Welles stressed that unlike some of his other films, he was under no deadlines and regarded the film as "My own personal project, to be completed in my own time, as one might with a novel", since he was not contracted to any studio and had privately financed the picture himself.

At one point in the 1960s, Welles planned to end his version by having Don Quixote and Sancho Panza surviving an atomic cataclysm, but the sequence was never shot. As Welles deemed that principal photography was complete by 1969, it is likely that by this stage he had changed his conception of the ending.

In 1972, Welles dispatched his cinematographer Gary Graver to Seville, to shoot the Holy Week procession and some inserts of windmills for the film—although this footage has since been lost.

By the early 1980s, he was looking to complete the picture as an "essay film" in the style of his F for Fake and Filming Othello, using the footage of Don Quixote and Sancho Panza to compare the values of Cervantes' Spain, Franco's Spain (when the film was set), and modern-day Spain post-Franco. Welles himself explained, "I keep changing my approach, the subject takes hold of me and I grow dissatisfied with the old footage. I once had a finished version where the Don and Sancho go to the Moon, but then [the United States] went to the Moon, which ruined it, so I scrapped ten reels [100 minutes]. Now I am going to make it a film essay about the pollution of old Spain. But it's personal to me." However, he never filmed any of the footage necessary for this later variation.

One possible explanation for the film's lack of completion was offered by Welles's comments to his friend and colleague Dominique Antoine. He told her that he could only complete Don Quixote if he one day decided not to return to Spain, since every fresh visit gave him a new perspective, with new concepts for the film. At the time of his death, he was still discussing doing more filming for Don Quixote, and had produced over 1,000 pages of script for the project.

The endless delay in completing the project spurred the filmmaker to consider calling the project When Are You Going to Finish Don Quixote?, referring to the question he was tired of hearing. It is unclear whether or not Welles was joking about this. Up until his death in 1985, Welles was still publicly talking about bringing the unfinished work to completion.

Film scholars Jean-Paul Berthomé and François Thomas have called Don Quixote "the archetype of an unfinished Welles film, unfinished because it was unfinishable. ... Welles is almost certainly alone among major filmmakers in having invented the means to allow himself to assert his full right not to show his work to the public until he judged the moment had come, even if that meant he never showed it at all."

== Footage ==
In May 1986, the first public exhibition of the Don Quixote footage was shown at the Cannes Film Festival. The footage consisted of 45 minutes of scenes and outtakes from the film, assembled by the archivists from the Cinémathèque Française and supervised by the director Costa-Gavras.

The full surviving footage shot by Welles is split between several different locations. Oja Kodar, Welles's companion in his later years, deposited some material with the Munich Film Museum, but in the course of making Don Quijote de Orson Welles (1992) she had earlier sold much of the footage to the Filmoteca Española in Madrid, whose holdings include around 40 minutes edited and dubbed by Welles. Welles's own editing workprint is held by the Cinémathèque Française in Paris. Additional footage, including the negative, was held by Welles' editor Mauro Bonanni in Italy, and in at least one other private collection.

Bonanni and Kodar battled over the negative for decades. Finally, Corte Suprema di Cassazione, Italy's highest court of appeal, ruled against Bonanni in June 2017. He was forced to surrender the negative to Kodar.

== 1992 version ==
Don Quijote de Orson Welles is a 1992 version of Welles's unfinished Don Quixote edited by director Jesús Franco.

In 1990, Spanish producer Patxi Irigoyen and Franco acquired the rights to some of the extant footage of the Don Quixote project. Material was provided to them by numerous sources including Oja Kodar, the Croatian actress who was Welles's mistress and collaborator in his later years, and Suzanne Cloutier, the Canadian actress who played Desdemona in Welles's film version of Othello. In his will, Welles left Kodar the rights to all his unfinished film projects (including Don Quixote) and she was keen to see it completed. She spent the late 1980s touring Europe in a camper van with her Don Quixote footage, and approached several notable directors to complete the project. All of them declined for various reasons - except Franco. Franco seemed a logical choice, as he had worked as Welles's second unit director on Chimes at Midnight.

However, Irigoyen and Franco were unable to obtain the footage with McCormack, which included a scene where Don Quixote destroys a movie screen that is showing a film of knights in battle. This footage, along with all footage featuring Patty McCormack, was held by Italian film editor Mauro Bonanni (who had worked on the film in Rome in 1969), who was engaged in a legal dispute with Kodar over the rights to the film. He refused to allow its incorporation into the Irigoyen-Franco project, although he would later permit some scenes to be shown on Italian television. As a consequence of this litigation between Kodar and Bonanni, Kodar insisted that none of the footage with Patty McCormack should be used.

Irigoyen and Franco faced several problems in putting the Welles footage together. Welles had worked in three different formats — 35 M.M., 16 M.M. and Super 16 M.M. — which created inconsistent visual quality. The wildly varying storage conditions of this footage had further exacerbated the variable visual quality. The lack of a screenplay also hampered efforts. Welles recorded less than an hour's soundtrack where he read a narration and provided dialogue for the main characters, but the rest of the footage was silent. A new script was created by Franco and voiceover actors were brought in to fill the silence left by Welles's incomplete work, although their impressions of Welles's narration and Quixote/Sancho Panza voices were far from convincing, especially when intercut with the original recordings. Joseph McBride refers to the soundtrack of Franco's version as "an off-putting melange of dubbed voices." A further controversy was the inclusion by Franco of footage of Welles filming in Spain, taken from a documentary he had made on Spain in the 1960s. Welles had not intended to appear in the film himself, other than in its framing scenes as the narrator, and yet the Irigoyen/Franco film features several scenes with Quixote and Sancho Panza on Spanish streets, with Welles apparently looking on. Additionally, Franco inserts a windmill scene into the film, even though Welles had not filmed one or ever intended to film one - the scene relies on footage of Quixote charging across plains, interspersed with windmill images (which were not filmed by Welles), zooms and jump cuts.

Furthermore, Welles feared a repetition of the experience of having the film reedited by someone else (as had happened to him on The Magnificent Ambersons, The Stranger, The Lady from Shanghai, Macbeth, Mr. Arkadin and Touch of Evil), so he divided up all the reels of film for Don Quixote and deliberately mislabelled many of them, telling Mauro Bonanni, "If someone finds them, they mustn't understand the sequence, because only I know that."

The Irigoyen and Franco work premiered at the 1992 Cannes Film Festival as Don Quixote de Orson Welles, with English- and Spanish-language versions produced. Initial reaction was predominantly negative, and this version was never theatrically released in the U.S. In September 2008, a U.S. DVD edition was released as Orson Welles' Don Quixote by Image Entertainment. The footage of Don Quixote in the cinema that is in Bonanni's possession has turned up on YouTube.

Spanish film critic Juan Cobos saw a rough cut of Welles's unfinished footage (which he praised very highly), and stated that the 1992 edit by Franco bore little resemblance to it. Similarly, Jonathan Rosenbaum describes the 45 minutes of footage assembled in 1986 as being vastly superior to the Franco edit.

On Don Quixote and the subject of the artist's rights over his or her work — particularly the right not to finish — film scholars Jean-Paul Berthomé and François Thomas wrote that "the so-called completed version, hastily cobbled together in 1992 by Jesús Franco ... merely created a sense of regret that posterity does not always respect this right not to finish."

=== Cast ===
- Francisco Reiguera as Don Quixote
- Akim Tamiroff as Sancho Panza
- Orson Welles as himself/Narrator
- José Mediavilla as the Spanish-language voice of Don Quixote
- Juan Carlos Ordóñez as the Spanish-language voice of Sancho Panza
- Constantino Romero as the Spanish-language voice of the Narrator
