= Beatrice Welles =

American actress (born 1955)

- Born: Beatrice Giuditta Welles; November 13, 1955 (age 71); New York City, U.S.
- Occupations: Actress; designer
- Known for: Management of the estate of Orson Welles
- Spouses: Christopher Smith (m. 1987; div. 1995) Jonathan O'Donoghue (m. 1997; div. 2004)
- Parents: Orson Welles; Paola Mori

Beatrice Giuditta Welles (also known as Beatrice Mori di Gerfalco Welles; born November 13, 1955) is an American former child actress, known for her roles in the film Chimes at Midnight (1966) and the documentary travelogue In the Land of Don Quixote (1964). The daughter of American filmmaker Orson Welles and Italian actress Paola Mori, she is a former model, radio and TV personality, founder of a cosmetics line and designer of handbags and jewelry.

== Life and career ==
Beatrice Giuditta Welles (also known as Beatrice Mori di Gerfalco Welles) was born in Manhattan on November 13, 1955, to Orson Welles and his third wife, Paola Mori. A countess from an Italian noble family with antecedents in the Middle Ages, Welles is the half-sister of Chris Welles Feder and Rebecca Welles Manning (1944–2004), from her father's previous two marriages. She was named after her paternal grandmother, concert pianist Beatrice Ives Welles. She was baptized at the Good Shepherd Roman Catholic Church in Beverly Hills, with Frank Sinatra and actress Mercedes McCambridge serving as godparents.

Raised and educated in Europe with private tutors, Welles spent her childhood in the close company of her parents. She appeared on stage at the age of five in an Irish stage production of Chimes at Midnight, and later in the 1966 film of the same name. Fifty years later, she recalled the filming for the Criterion Collection release of the film on DVD and Blu-ray. Her father's film, The Immortal Story (1968), was shot at the Welles family home outside Madrid, Spain, and she spent countless hours with him in the editing room.

A severe injury during her teenage years ended Welles's hopes for an equestrian career. She turned to modeling and appeared in layouts in Vogue, as well as runway work in Paris, Milan, London and New York, wearing the clothes of Valentino, Halston and Chanel. She became the news director at KAZM-AM radio in Arizona in the early-1970s and later a regional television personality and longtime spokeswoman for a major Southwestern automotive dealership. Within a span of 10 months in the mid-1980s, she lost her father, mother and maternal grandmother. At the same time, a longtime romantic relationship came to a sudden end.

Influenced by her association with makeup icons Kevin Aucoin and Barbara Daly, Welles developed her own line of cosmetics and counted Diana, Princess of Wales, Elizabeth Taylor, Joan Rivers and Oprah Winfrey among her clients. She also created a line of handbags and jewelry sold through Goldenstein Gallery in Sedona, Arizona.

A Nevada resident, Welles has been twice married and divorced: from Christopher F. Smith (1987–1995), and Jonathan M. O'Donoghue (1997–2004).

== Animal rights ==
Welles is an animal rights advocate, something she attributes to being raised by a father who loved animals and a mother actively involved in animal rescue. In the early 1980s, Welles helped establish the first low-cost spay and neuter clinic in the United States. She has supported free spay and neuter services in underserved communities and offered financial aid to various animal rescue groups worldwide. Welles has lent support to groups along the West Coast, South America, Asia and Europe, including efforts to assist stray dogs in Romania through ROLDA and aid the Bohdi dog shelter in Thailand. Welles was one of five founders of the Animal Foundation in Las Vegas and served on their board of trustees for nine years. Welles is the founder and CEO of her own 501(c)(3), Voices for the Voiceless, from 1997 to 2005 and Windsong Trailer Park Cats from 2007 to 2016. Since 2009, she has served on the board of Alex Pacheco's 600 Million Dogs, working to bring a permanent end to pet overpopulation worldwide. Welles was one of the first to implement TNR (Trap-Neuter-Return) in Nevada, Hawaii and Arizona. In recent years, Welles has crusaded to reduce plastic pollution in oceans and waterways that kill wildlife. More than 8 million tons of plastic makes its way into oceans each year.

== Orson Welles estate ==
Orson Welles died on October 10, 1985. His widow, Paola Mori, died 10 months later, following a car crash. After the death of her parents, Welles filed a lawsuit over the estate, which involved her father's longtime partner, Oja Kodar. The two women signed a settlement on November 7, 1986, in a Clark County, Nevada, courthouse.

In 1989, the Welles estate and the Directors Guild of America successfully fought off an attempt by Turner Entertainment to colorize Citizen Kane. Given the terms of Welles's contract with RKO Radio Pictures, the colorization could not proceed without the estate's permission.

Beatrice Welles collaborated with producer Julian Schlossberg on the restoration of her father's film Othello, which screened at the Cannes Film Festival in 1992, 40 years after its release.

Six years later, she protested a reedit of her father's film Touch of Evil (1958). She objected to its being reedited and marketed as a director's cut without her being allowed to screen it in advance. She said her actions were prompted by a disastrous edit of Don Quixote several years earlier.

After years of failed attempts to complete her father's unfinished final film, The Other Side of the Wind, Welles worked with filmmaker Filip Jan Rymsza and producer Frank Marshall to edit and release it. She is an executive producer on the film, which Netflix released in 2018 to critical acclaim. But less than three weeks before its premiere at the 2018 Venice Film Festival, she complained that the movie was in the hands of people her "father would have hated." Her remarks were likely directed at Netflix executives, who ignored her pleas months earlier to debut the movie at the Cannes Film Festival as originally planned. A statement by her was read at the Venice Film Festival, where she thanked the post-production team, saying, "Under the guidance of someone who knew him well, Peter Bogdanovich managed to get a very difficult job done. Bob Murawski, an excellent editor in his own right, was given an incredibly difficult task to edit Orson Welles's last picture. I can only say 'Bravo, well done, what an undertaking'."

In 2016, she explored a possible gallery exhibit of her father's paintings in New York and suggested a book based on his early letters and unpublished sketches, which came to fruition in 2019. In June 2018, it was revealed that the first-ever major exhibit of Orson Welles's artwork would take place from August 2 to September 23 in Edinburgh.

Beatrice Welles has spoken at numerous film festivals and screenings, including Film Forum in New York City, about her father's work and protecting his legacy. She was a keynote speaker at the 2015 Sedona Film Festival with film critic Jeffrey Lyons and Ray Kelly of the website Wellesnet.

In 2016, Beatrice Welles introduced The Lady from Shanghai at the Prescott Film Festival in Arizona. She was a guest speaker that same month at the Traverse City Film Festival in Michigan, hosting a showing of Citizen Kane with filmmaker Michael Moore and Chimes at Midnight with Philip Hallman of the University of Michigan. With director Peter Bogdanovich, she took part in an American Film Institute Master Class after a 75th-anniversary screening of Citizen Kane at the Egyptian Theatre in Hollywood in November 2016.

In spring 2017, the University of Michigan Library acquired dozens of unpublished Orson Welles scripts, reams of his personal and business correspondence, and boxes of documents related to the making of his films and stage shows from Beatrice Welles. She said of her decision, "I thought about this from my own point of view and not my father's. He was not enamored with 'libraries and universities', but I personally felt it was time that my father's items were in one place as much as was possible. I've seen the University of Michigan collection and believe that the one-of-a-kind items and rare documents I had, belonged with all of the other treasures there."

In 2017, Janus Films and The Criterion Collection acquired the rights to Othello from her (on behalf of Shout! Factory/Westchester Films) and released restored versions of her father's 1952 and 1955 edits, as well as his 1978 documentary Filming Othello.

Working with filmmaker Mark Cousins, she co-conceived, co-starred and served as a consultant on the documentary The Eyes of Orson Welles, which examines her father's film and stage work through a trove of seldom-seen drawings. It premiered at the 71st annual Cannes Film Festival on May 9, 2018. The documentary received favorable reviews, with The Hollywood Reporter's Todd McCarthy writing: "Freshly conceived, mordantly whimsical, light on its feet and fleet of mind, The Eyes of Orson Welles rightly makes no extensive claims for Welles' drawing and painting skills, but positions them honestly as one heretofore overlooked aspect of the man's polymorphously abundant talent."

A 2018 art exhibit at Summerhall in Edinburgh of the filmmaker's work, curated by Cousins and Beatrice Welles, was described as showcasing works with the "mental energy of a Picasso or a Jean Cocteau ... [Welles] was massively attracted to the Celtic world, the Latin world and the Arab world. In other words, worlds of excess, where the heart is worn on the outside. There’s something about his passion, his lust for life, that punky, unplugged energy that you can see in these drawings." Conversely, The Guardian wrote: "The visual art of Orson Welles has never been exhibited before, and that's because it isn't really art. Welles did caricatures of himself, landscape sketches of the many places his film-making adventures took him, and made his own Christmas cards."

Beatrice Welles was featured in the Morgan Neville documentary They'll Love Me When I'm Dead, which premiered on Netflix in 2018.

Working with Titan Books and author Simon Braund, Beatrice Welles produced Orson Welles Portfolio: Sketches and Drawings from the Welles Estate, published in 2019.

Beatrice Welles was initially supportive of the film Hopper/Welles, but unsuccessfully attempted to block its showing at the Venice Film Festival in 2020. The film utilized material her father had shot during the making of The Other Side of the Wind.
