= Keith Baxter (actor) =

Welsh actor (1933–2023)

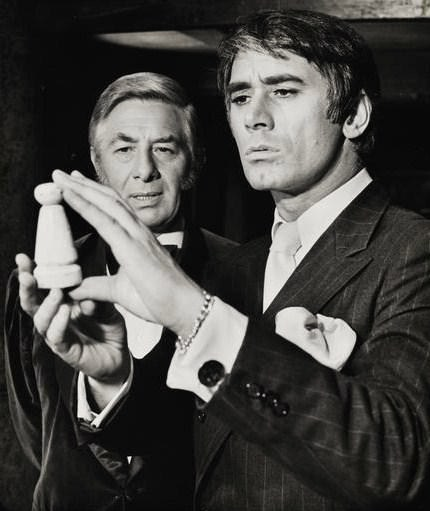
- Paul Rogers and Baxter (right) in the Broadway production of Sleuth (1971)
- Born: Keith Stanley Baxter-Wright; 29 April 1933; Newport, Monmouthshire, Wales
- Died: 24 September 2023 (aged 90)
- Occupation: Actor
- Years active: 1957–2023
- Spouse: Brian Holden

Keith Stanley Baxter-Wright (29 April 1933 – 24 September 2023) was a Welsh theatre, film and television actor and director.

== Early years and RADA ==
Keith Stanley Baxter-Wright was born in Newport, Monmouthshire, on 29 April 1933. He was the son of Stanley Baxter-Wright, a Merchant Navy sea captain, and Emily Baxter (née Howell). They lived for a time in Romilly Road, Barry, Glamorgan. He was educated at Newport High School and Barry Grammar School. His early introduction to the stage was from his interest in making model theatres and stage scenery. He studied at London's Royal Academy of Dramatic Arts, during which period he shared a flat with a classmate, Alan Bates. He made his film debut in the 1957 remake of The Barretts of Wimpole Street and appeared uncredited as a detective in the British horror classic Peeping Tom (1960).

== Films ==
In 1960, Orson Welles selected Baxter to portray Prince Hal in his stage production Chimes at Midnight, which combined portions of the Shakespearean plays Henry IV, Part I, Henry IV, Part II, Henry V, Richard II, and The Merry Wives of Windsor and brought the comic figure of Falstaff to the forefront of a primarily tragic tale. Baxter repeated his performance in the 1965 film version. Additional film credits include Ash Wednesday (1973; with Elizabeth Taylor), Golden Rendezvous (1977), and Killing Time (1998).

== Broadway ==
In 1961, Baxter made his Broadway debut as King Henry VIII in A Man for All Seasons. Other New York City stage credits included The Affair (1962), Avanti! (1968), Sleuth (1970), Romantic Comedy (1980), and The Woman in Black (2001).

== Other selected theatrical appearances ==
- Macbeth, Birmingham Repertory Theatre, Birmingham, England, 1972
- Vershinin, Three Sisters, Greenwich Theatre, London, 1973
- Benedick, Much Ado about Nothing, Royal Lyceum Theatre, Edinburgh, Scotland, 1973
- Antony, Antony and Cleopatra, Stratford Festival Theatre, Stratford, Ontario, 1976
- Witwoud, The Way of the World, Stratford Festival Theatre, 1976
- Vershinin, Three Sisters, Stratford Festival Theatre, 1976
- King, The Red Devil Battery Sign, Round House Theatre, then Phoenix Theatre, both London, 1977
- Lord Illingworth, A Woman of No Importance, Chichester Festival Theatre, 1978
- Antony, Antony and Cleopatra, Young Vic Theatre, London, 1982
- Elyot, Private Lives, Aldwych Theatre, London, 1990
- Cassius, Julius Caesar, Hartford Stage Company, 1990-1991
- The Resistible Rise of Arturo Ui, Chichester and The Duchess Theatre, 2013

== Directing ==
- The Red Devil Battery Sign, Roundhouse and Phoenix Theatre, 1977
- Time and the Conways, 1988–89
- Rope, Chichester Festival Theatre then Wyndham's Theatre, 1994
- Dangerous Corner, Chichester Festival Theatre, 1994, and Whitehall Theatre, 1995
- Gaslight
- After October, 1996–97
- Silhouette

Baxter regularly directed shows at Shakespeare Theatre Company in Washington D.C., including:

- The Country Wife (2000)
- The Rivals (2003)
- Lady Windermere's Fan (2003)
- The Imaginary Invalid (2008)
- The Rivals (2009)
- Mrs. Warren's Profession (2010)
- An Ideal Husband (2011)
- The Importance of Being Earnest

== Cleopatra ==
Baxter was signed for the role of Octavian "Augustus" Caesar opposite Elizabeth Taylor's Cleopatra in the 1963 film of Cleopatra. Taylor's bout of pneumonia, soon after filming began, temporarily shut down filming. By the time she recovered, Baxter had other commitments and Roddy McDowall assumed the role. Baxter co-starred with Taylor in the film Ash Wednesday (1973). He also later played Mark Antony opposite Maggie Smith's Cleopatra in Antony and Cleopatra at the Stratford Festival in Canada in 1976.

== Television work ==
Baxter's television work included appearances in Gideon's Way, The Avengers, Hawaii Five-O, Thriller (1976) and the 1998 mini-series Merlin.

== Other work ==
Baxter was the author of a memoir, My Sentiments Exactly and of several plays, including 56 Duncan Terrace, Cavell and Barnaby and the Old Boys.

In 1971 he recorded an LP of several short stories by Saki for Caedmon Records under the title Reginald on House-Parties, and Other Stories.

Baxter was an associate member of the Royal Academy of Dramatic Art.

== Personal life and death ==
During the 1960s Baxter had a brief affair with the dancer Rudolf Nureyev. In 1979 he met Brian Holden and formed a lasting relationship; they married in 2016 and moved from London to West Sussex.

Keith Baxter died from a heart attack while swimming on holiday in Corsica, on 24 September 2023. He was 90, and was survived by his husband.

== Theatre awards ==
- 1962 Theatre World Award for A Man for All Seasons
- 1971 Drama Desk Award for Sleuth

== Filmography ==
=== Film ===
Year	Title	Role	Notes
1956	She Stoops to Conquer	Thomas	TV film
1957	The Barretts of Wimpole Street	Charles Barrett	
1958	Incident at Echo Six	Duty officer	TV film
1960	Peeping Tom	Detective Baxter	Uncredited
1963	Where Angels Fear to Tread	Gino Carella	TV film
1965	Hold My Hand, Soldier	The Private	TV film
1965	Chimes at Midnight	Prince Hal	
1970	With Love in Mind	Tony Preston	
1973	Ash Wednesday	David	
1974	The Regent's Wife	Don Fermín de Pas	
1977	Golden Rendezvous	Preston	
1988	Berlín Blues	Professor Huessler	
1998	Killing Time	Reilly Bodyguard #3	

=== Television ===
Year	Title	Role	Notes
1957	ITV Television Playhouse	Vivian Brent	Episode: "Six Stayed the Night"
1958	ITV Play of the Week	Ben Kent	Episode: "The Troublemakers"
1958	ITV Play of the Week	Desmond O'Malley	Episode: "The Young May Moon"
1958	ITV Play of the Week	Hector Malone	Episode: "Man and Superman"
1959	ITV Play of the Week	Stacey Crispin	Episode: "A Dead Secret"
1959	ITV Play of the Week	Broadcaster	Episode: "Sweet Poison"
1959	ITV Television Playhouse	Police Constable Peterson	Episode: "The Extra Grave"
1960	ITV Television Playhouse	Tom Belton	Episode: "After the Party"
1960	ITV Play of the Week	Adrian	Episode: "Square Dance"
1963	BBC Sunday-Night Play	Viazemsky	Episode: "The Reward of Silence"
1963	BBC Sunday-Night Play	Nicholas	Episode: "For Tea on Sunday"
1963	The Sentimental Agent	Yanni	Episode: "Not Quite Fully Covered"
1964	The Hidden Truth	Yanni	Episode: "One for the Road"
1964	Gideon's Way	Geoffrey Miles	Episode: "The 'V' Men"
1965	Armchair Theatre	Harry	Episode: "I've Got a System"
1965	Public Eye	Paul Garston	Episode: "Nobody Kills Santa Claus"
1965	ITV Sunday Night Drama	Drango	Episode: "Suspense Hour: Curtains for Sheila"
1968	Love Story	David	Episode: "The Vast Horizons of the Mind"
1968	BBC Play of the Month	Dunois	Episode: "St. Joan"
1969	Thirty-Minute Theatre	Jim Garden	Episode: "Stake Money"
1969	The Avengers	Dunbar	Episode: "Homicide and Old Lace"
1973	Orson Welles Great Mysteries	Philip Faulkner	Episode: "Farewell to the Faulkners"
1974	Dial M for Murder	Paul Duras	Episode: "The Vineyard"
1976	Thriller	Tony Risanti	Episode: "Nightmare for a Nightingale"
1978	Will Shakespeare	Earl of Essex	Episode: "Rebellion's Masterpiece"
1978	Hawaii Five-O	Reverend Andy	Episode: "The Miracle Man"
1992	Performance	Actor	Episode: "Six Characters in Search of an Author"
1998	Merlin	Sir Hector	Miniseries
