= Chimes at Midnight =

1965 film by Orson Welles

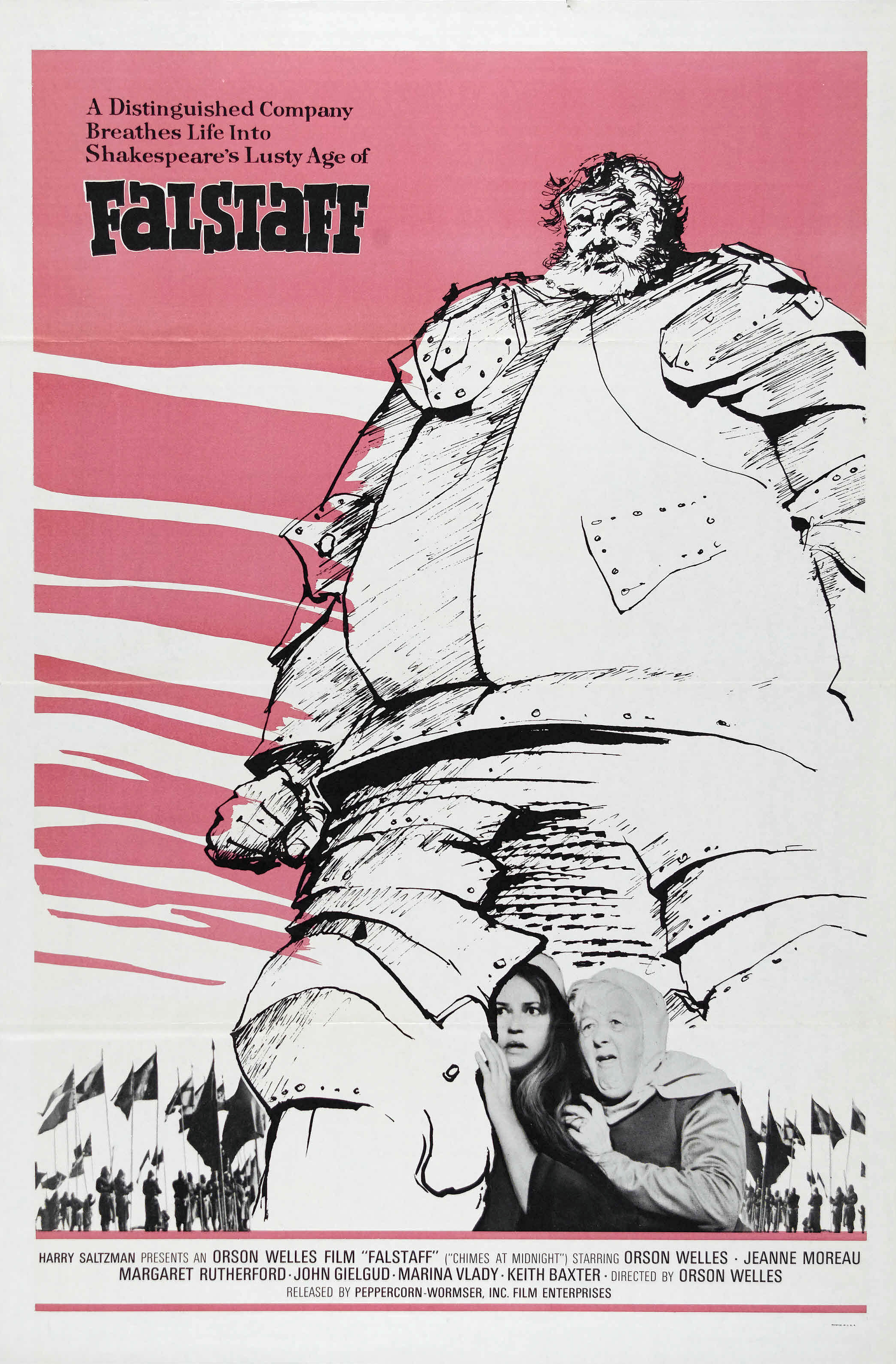
- U.S. theatrical release poster
- Directed by: Orson Welles
- Screenplay by: Orson Welles
- Based on: The Henriad by William Shakespeare; Holinshed's Chronicles by Raphael Holinshed
- Produced by: Emiliano Piedra; Ángel Escolano; Harry Saltzman
- Starring: Orson Welles; Jeanne Moreau; Margaret Rutherford; John Gielgud; Marina Vlady; Walter Chiari; Keith Baxter
- Cinematography: Edmond Richard
- Edited by: Elena Jaumandreu; Frederick Muller; Peter Parasheles
- Music by: Angelo Francesco Lavagnino
- Color process: Black and white
- Production companies: Internacional Films Española; Alpine Productions
- Distributed by: Brepi Films (Spain); CFDC (France & Switzerland)
- Release dates: December 23, 1965 (Barcelona); June 20, 1966 (France); November 17, 1966 (Switzerland)
- Running time: 119 minutes
- Countries: Spain; France; Switzerland
- Language: English
- Budget: $800,000
- Box office: 516,762 admissions (France)

Chimes at Midnight (Spanish: Campanadas a medianoche, released in most of Europe as Falstaff) is a 1965 period comedy-drama film written, directed by, and starring Orson Welles. Its plot centers on William Shakespeare's recurring character Sir John Falstaff and his fatherly relationship with Prince Hal, who must choose loyalty to Falstaff or to his actual father, King Henry IV. The English-language film was an international co-production of Spain, France, and Switzerland.

Welles said that the core of the film's story was "betrayal of friendship". It stars Welles as Falstaff, Keith Baxter as Prince Hal, John Gielgud as Henry IV, Jeanne Moreau as Doll Tearsheet, and Margaret Rutherford as Mistress Quickly. The script contains text from five of Shakespeare's plays, primarily Henry IV, Part 1 and Henry IV, Part 2, but also Richard II, Henry V, and The Merry Wives of Windsor. Ralph Richardson's narration is taken from the works of chronicler Raphael Holinshed.

Welles had produced a Broadway stage adaptation of nine Shakespeare plays, Five Kings, in 1939. In 1960, he revived this project in Ireland as Chimes at Midnight, which was his final stage performance. Neither of these plays was successful, but Welles considered portraying Falstaff his life's ambition and turned the project into a film. To get financing, he lied to producer Emiliano Piedra that he intended to make a version of Treasure Island, and keeping the film funded during its production was a constant struggle. Welles shot Chimes at Midnight in Spain between 1964 and 1965; it premiered at the 1966 Cannes Film Festival, winning two awards there.

Initially dismissed by most film critics, Chimes at Midnight is now regarded as one of Welles's highest achievements, and Welles called it his best work. Welles felt a strong connection to the character of Falstaff and called him "Shakespeare's greatest creation". Some film scholars and Welles's collaborators have made comparisons between Falstaff and Welles, while others see a resemblance between Falstaff and Welles's father. Disputes over the ownership of Chimes at Midnight made it difficult to view the film legally until recently. It was released in the UK on DVD and Blu-ray in 2015. A new restoration by Janus Films and The Criterion Collection screened at Film Forum in New York on January 1–12, 2016. The Criterion Collection released the film on Blu-ray and DVD on August 30, 2016.

== Plot ==
Sir John Falstaff and Justice Shallow walk through the snow, then to a warm fire inside Shallow's home in Gloucestershire, as the two reminisce. King Henry IV of England has succeeded Richard II, whom he has killed. Richard II's true heir, Edmund Mortimer, is a prisoner in Wales, and Mortimer's cousins (the Percys) Northumberland, Worcester, and Northumberland's son Henry Percy (called "Hotspur") demand that the king rescue Mortimer. He refuses, and the Percys begin to plot his overthrow.

To Henry's great dissatisfaction, his son Prince Hal spends most of his time at the Boar's Head Tavern, drinking and carousing with prostitutes, thieves, and other criminals under Falstaff's fatherly influence. Falstaff insists that he and Hal should think of themselves as gentlemen, but Hal warns Falstaff that he will one day reject both this lifestyle and Falstaff. The next morning, Hal, Falstaff, Bardolph, Peto, and Poins disguise themselves in Gadshill to prepare to rob a group of traveling pilgrims. After Falstaff, Bardolph, and Peto rob the pilgrims, Hal and Poins jump out in disguises and take the stolen treasure from Falstaff as a prank.

Back at the tavern, Falstaff begins to tell Hal and Poins with increasing exaggeration the story of how the money was stolen from him. Hal and Poins poke holes in Falstaff's tale until they reveal their prank. In celebration of the newly recovered treasure, Falstaff and Hal take turns impersonating Henry, with a cooking pot crown and vocal impressions. Falstaff's Henry chastises Hal for spending his time with common criminals, but names Falstaff as his one virtuous friend. Hal's Henry calls Falstaff a "misleader of youth".

Hal visits the king at the castle, and Henry scolds him for his criminal and unethical lifestyle. Henry warns Hal about Hotspur's growing army and its threat to his crown. Hal passionately vows to his unimpressed father that he will defend Henry and redeem his name. The King's army, including Falstaff, parades through the streets and off to war. Before the battle, Henry meets with Worcester and offers to forgive all of Hotspur's men of treason if they surrender immediately. Hal vows to kill Hotspur himself. Worcester returns to his camp and lies to Hotspur, telling him that Henry intends to execute all traitors.

The two armies meet in the Battle of Shrewsbury, but Falstaff hides in shrubs for most of the conflict. After a long, bloody fight, the king's men win the battle, after which Hotspur and Hal meet alone and duel; as Falstaff watches, Hal kills Hotspur. Henry sentences Worcester to death and takes his men prisoner. Falstaff brings Hotspur's body to Henry, claiming that he killed Hotspur; Henry does not believe him, looking disapprovingly at Hal and the ignoble company he keeps.

"I know thee not, old man: fall to thy prayers;
How ill white hairs become a fool and jester!
I have long dream'd of such a kind of man,
So surfeit-swell'd, so old and so profane;
But, being awaked, I do despise my dream."
— Henry IV, Part 2, Act V, Scene 5

The narrator explains that all of Henry IV's rebellious enemies had been killed by 1408, but that Henry's health has begun to deteriorate. At the castle, Henry becomes upset when told that Hal is once again spending time with Falstaff, and collapses. Hal visits the castle and discovers that Henry is sicker than he had realized. Hal vows to Henry to be a good and noble king. Henry finally has faith in Hal and advises him on how to be a king. Henry dies and Hal tells his men that he is now King Henry V.

Falstaff, Shallow, and Silence sit in front of the fire, continuing the film's first scene. They receive news of Henry IV's death and that Hal's coronation will be held that morning. Falstaff becomes ecstatic and goes directly to the castle, thinking he will become a great and powerful nobleman under Henry V. At the coronation, Falstaff cannot contain his excitement and interrupts the ceremony, announcing himself to Hal. Hal turns his back on Falstaff and proclaims that he is now finished with his former lifestyle. As Falstaff looks up at Hal with a mixture of pride and despair, the new king banishes him. The coronation continues into the castle as Falstaff walks away, claiming he will be sent for that evening. That night, Falstaff dies at the Boar's Head Tavern, and his friends mourn him, saying he died of a broken heart. Hal goes on to become a good and noble king.

== Cast ==
- Orson Welles as Sir John Falstaff, a knight and father figure to Prince Hal
- Keith Baxter as Prince Hal, the Prince of Wales and heir to the throne of England
- John Gielgud as King Henry IV, the King of England
- Margaret Rutherford as Mistress Quickly, hostess of the Boar's Head Tavern
- Jeanne Moreau as Doll Tearsheet, a prostitute
- Alan Webb as Justice Shallow, a country justice and old friend of Falstaff
- Walter Chiari as Justice Silence, a country justice
- Michael Aldridge as Pistol, a friend of Falstaff
- Tony Beckley as Ned Poins, a friend of Falstaff and Hal
- Charles Farrell as Bardolph, a friend of Falstaff and Hal
- Patrick Bedford as Nym, a friend of Falstaff and Hal
- José Nieto as Earl of Northumberland, an Earl in rebellion against the King, and cousin of Edmund Mortimer
- Keith Pyott as the Lord Chief Justice
- Fernando Rey as Earl of Worcester, Northumberland's brother, and cousin of Edmund Mortimer
- Norman Rodway as Henry Percy, called Hotspur, Northumberland's son, and second cousin of Edmund Mortimer
- Marina Vlady as Kate Percy, Hotspur's wife
- Andrew Faulds as Earl of Westmorland, an Earl loyal to the King
- Jeremy Rowe as Prince John, Henry IV's second son
- Beatrice Welles and Bruno Yasoni as Falstaff's Page, a servant. Yasoni took over the role when Beatrice could not finish filming.
- Ralph Richardson as the voice of the narrator
- Ingrid Pitt as a courtesan (uncredited)

== Original stage productions ==
Welles's inspiration for Chimes at Midnight began in 1930 when he was a student at the Todd Seminary for Boys in Woodstock, Illinois. He tried to stage a three-and-a-half-hour combination of several of Shakespeare's historical plays called The Winter of Our Discontent in which he played Richard III. School officials forced him to make cuts to the production. Chimes at Midnight originated in 1939 as a stage play called Five Kings, which Welles wrote and partially staged. It was an ambitious adaptation of several Shakespeare plays that chronicled the stories of Richard II, Henry IV, Henry V, Henry VI and Richard III. Its sources were Richard II, Henry IV, Part 1, Henry IV, Part 2, Henry V, The Merry Wives of Windsor, Henry VI, Part 1, Henry VI, Part 2, Henry VI, Part 3, and Richard III—sometimes collectively called the "War of the Roses cycle". The grouping of Henry IV, Part 1, Henry IV, Part 2 and Henry V is often called the Henriad.

=== Five Kings (1939) ===
Five Kings was announced as part of the newly revived Mercury Theatre's second season in 1938. John Houseman had secured a partnership with the prestigious Theatre Guild to produce the play for US$40,000, with an initial tour of Baltimore, Boston, Washington D.C., and Philadelphia before debuting on Broadway. Welles intended to stage only the first part of the play—which was primarily taken from Henry IV Parts 1 and 2 and Henry V—during the tour while simultaneously rehearsing Part Two and finally debuting the full production on Broadway. Houseman said the play's aim was "to combine the immediate quality of the Elizabethan with all the devices and techniques possible in the modern theatre." The cast included Welles as Falstaff, Burgess Meredith as Prince Hal, John Emery as Hotspur, Morris Ankrum as Henry IV and Robert Speaight as the Narrator. The play's music was by Aaron Copland. Welles commissioned an elaborate revolving set, but it was not completed during the five weeks allotted to rehearsals.

Welles avoided attending the rehearsals or finishing the play's final script and instead often went out drinking and socializing with co-star Meredith, with the result that only specific scenes or fragments of the play were ever rehearsed. The Baltimore performance was eventually dropped and at the first dress rehearsal in Boston, it was discovered that the play was over five and a half hours long and contained 46 scenes. Welles cut 14 scenes and shortened others, which caused the built-in timer for the revolving set to move out of synchronization. Five Kings, Part 1 premiered at the Colonial Theatre in Boston on February 27, 1939, and was a disaster. Critics were either scathing or apologetic, and only the play's battle scenes received praise. By the end of the Boston run, the Theatre Guild was on the verge of dropping the production, and canceled the D.C. engagement. Welles then edited the show to three and a half hours. The play closed after only a few performances in Philadelphia, and the Theatre Guild terminated its contract with the Mercury Theater. Photographs of the play's rehearsals show similarities to Chimes at Midnight, including the Boar's Head Tavern set and the character blocking of the "chimes at midnight" scene with Falstaff, Shallow, and Silence.

=== Chimes at Midnight (1960) ===
Welles returned to the project in 1960, with performances in Belfast and Dublin. This version, retitled Chimes at Midnight, was produced by Welles's old friend Hilton Edwards through his Dublin-based company Gate Theatre. The cast included Welles as Falstaff, Keith Baxter as Prince Hal, Hilton Edwards as the Narrator, Reginald Jarman as Henry IV, and Alexis Kanner as Hotspur. At one point, Welles and Edwards wanted Micheál Mac Liammóir to replace Jarman, but Mac Liammóir would only accept the role of Prince Hal. Hilton Edwards was officially credited as director, but Welles is usually acknowledged as the actual director and often directed rehearsals. Welles's alleged biological son Michael Lindsay-Hogg also worked on the play as an actor and as Edwards's personal assistant. Welles's opinion of Falstaff had grown since first playing the part, and his new version of the play focused more upon the relationship between Falstaff and Prince Hal than on Hal's defeat of Hotspur. Most of the scenes from Henry V used in the first version were removed. Welles intended to perform the play in Belfast, Dublin, and London before filming it in Yugoslavia.

Rehearsals for the play began in Russell Square, London, with a read-through. After a week of rehearsing, Welles left to secure further funding and Edwards directed the play, working on blocking and lighting. Welles returned a week before the premiere without having learned a line. The cast had their technical rehearsal the night before opening. which lasted until 8 a.m. the next morning. They never had a dress rehearsal or even a run-through and had never seen Welles without the book or in costume. After premiering at the Grand Opera House in Belfast on February 13, 1960, and receiving a good review from a Variety correspondent, it moved to the Gaiety Theatre in Dublin. For two nights Welles did a one-man show, starting with readings of J. M. Synge, Riders to the Sea, Moby Dick and the works of Isak Dinesen. The second half was a TV show with questions from the audience. Afterward it was revealed that the TV cameras were fake, just to attract an audience. Welles continued to adjust the play throughout its short production, and at one point moved Mistress Quickly's speech about Falstaff's death to the very beginning of the play. He finally abandoned the project in late March 1960, when his friend Laurence Olivier offered him the chance to direct him in Eugène Ionesco's play Rhinoceros on London's West End. According to Keith Baxter, Welles ended the play's run because he was bored with it, and at one point told Baxter, "This is only a rehearsal for the movie, Keith, and I'll never make it unless you play Hal in that too." Five years later, Baxter and Welles's youngest daughter, Beatrice Welles, who played Falstaff's page, were the only cast members from the play to appear in the film. Chimes at Midnight was Welles's final performance in a theatrical play.

== Production ==
=== Pre-production ===
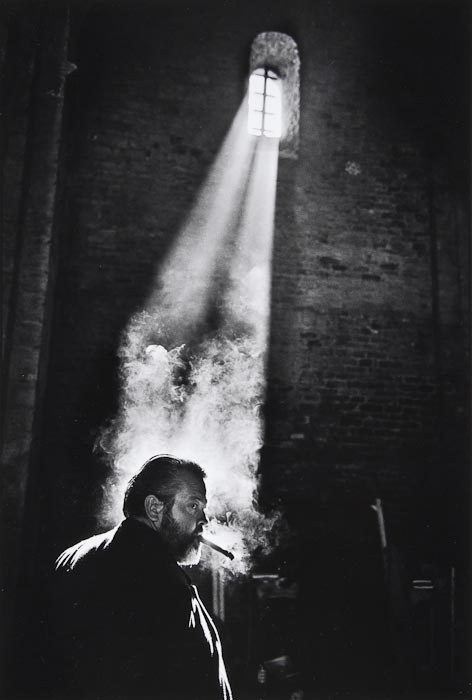
Orson Welles in Spain while shooting Chimes at Midnight c. 1964

In 1964, Welles met and befriended Spanish film producer Emiliano Piedra, who wanted to work with him. Piedra did not think a Shakespearean film was marketable enough and proposed that Welles make a version of Treasure Island. Welles agreed to this on condition that he simultaneously could make Chimes at Midnight, and Piedra agreed, not knowing that Welles had no intention of making Treasure Island. Although some B-roll footage of the Alicante departing from port was shot early in the production, no scenes from Treasure Island were ever shot or even scripted. Welles got away with this throughout preproduction by building sets that could be used in both films, such as Mistress Quickly's Boar's Head Tavern, which doubled as the Admiral Benbow Inn. Welles also cast each actor in both films, casting himself as Long John Silver, Baxter as Dr. Livesey, Beckley as Israel Hands and Gielgud as Squire Trelawney. Ironically, Welles played Long John Silver in the unrelated 1972 film version of Treasure Island.

Welles said that the Boar's Head Tavern was the only full set built for the film, with the others simply dressed or decorated on location. He said he designed, painted, and blow-torched the set, and designed all the film's costumes. Early in pre-production, Anthony Perkins approached Welles about playing Prince Hal, but Welles had already promised the role to Baxter. Hilton Edwards was initially cast as Justice Silence, but was replaced after he became ill. The title Chimes at Midnight derives from Henry IV, Part 2, where in response to Justice Shallow's reminiscences about their school days, Falstaff says: "We have heard the chimes at midnight, Master Shallow". Welles scholar Bridget Gellert Lyons said that the film's title, "which is given further resonance by the repeated intoning of bells throughout the film, is associated for the audience with sadness and mortality more than youthful carousal."

=== Filming ===
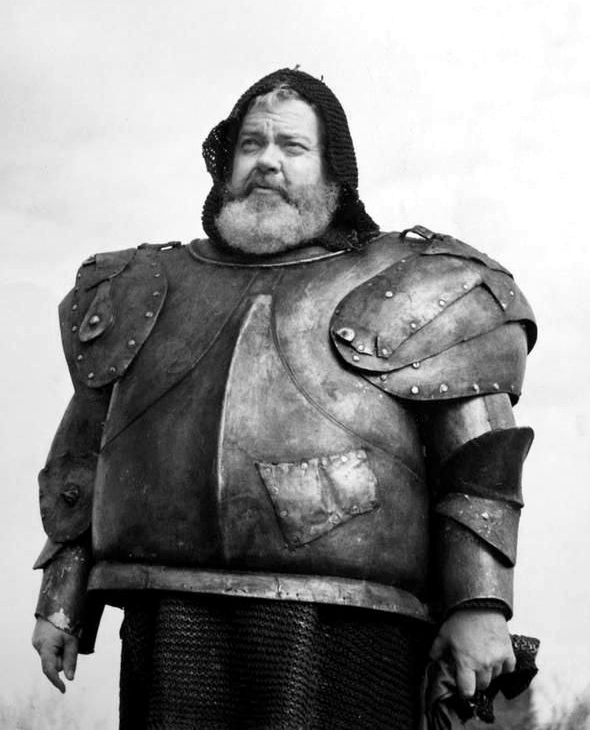
Orson Welles in Chimes at Midnight

The film was shot in Spain from September 1964 to April 1965, with a break from late December to late February. Welles's limitations on the film included a budget of $800,000 and actors Jeanne Moreau and John Gielgud being available for five and ten days respectively, while Margaret Rutherford was available for only four weeks. Welles later joked that during one scene that included seven principal characters, none of the actors was available at the same time and stand-ins were used for over-the-shoulder shots of all seven. Filming began in Colmenar and included all of Gielgud's scenes. Welles then traveled to Cardona, where the Royal Court scenes and Marina Vlady's scenes were shot, and to Madrid's Casa de Campo Park, where the Gadshill robbery scene was filmed. Madrid was also the location of the Boar's Head Tavern set, where Welles shot Moreau's and Rutherford's scenes. The production then traveled to Pedraza for some outdoor street scenes, and then to Soria to shoot in the snow for the opening shots. After shooting some scenes with Shallow and Silence in the Basque country, Welles returned to Madrid in December to film the battle scenes in Casa de Campo Park for ten days.

The exploitation filmmaker Jesús Franco worked as an assistant director on the film, and was heavily involved in the Battle of Shrewsbury sequence. He is not listed in the credits because he and Welles fell out. In a later interview, Franco described the production as "a total mess, not because the film was too expensive, but because Orson lied with the budget and the film was ten times more expensive."

By late December, Welles had run out of money and the film was put on hold while he sought additional funding. But some small scenes were shot during the break. Welles later said he had rejected offers for funding that were conditional on filming in color. He eventually secured funding from Harry Saltzman and production officially resumed in late February, with most of Baxter's longer speeches and the Coronation scene in Madrid. Between March and April, Welles finished the film with filler shots, closeups, the final rejection scene, and most of Falstaff's speeches. According to Baxter, Welles had stage fright and delayed all his scenes until the very end of filming, except for those that included other actors. Welles was timid about shooting his love scene with Moreau, and used a double whenever possible. Other filming locations included the Chateau Calatañazor, Puerta de San Vincente, the Soria Cathedral, and the city of Ávila. Welles was harsh with his crew members and, according to actor Andrew Faulds, "he spoke in five different languages to them and was pretty offensive—very demanding. I suppose he'd worked out that if you bullied actors, you didn't get the best from them whereas, to hell with the technicians. They had to do as they were told, and pretty quick." A scene depicting the assassination of King Richard II, originally intended to open the film, was cut.

=== Post-production ===
Baxter said that the film's soundtrack was post-dubbed months after filming was completed, and that actors Fernando Rey and Marina Vlady were dubbed by different actors because of their heavy accents. Baxter also said that he, Welles and Michael Aldridge recorded voices for several characters in post-production. Mistress Quickly's speech after Falstaff's death, which was disrupted by the audible hum of a power generator, used the original version of the soundtrack because Welles liked Rutherford's performance enough to keep it. The score was by Angelo Francesco Lavagnino, who had worked with Welles on Othello; it is notable for its prominent use of actual medieval monophonic dance tunes (and some later “early music", such as several of Antony Holborne's Elizabethan consort pieces) at a time when this was uncommon. The score was recorded in an Italian studio, which paid Lavagnino for his work on the film in exchange for the rights to the music, and later released a soundtrack album in Italy and the UK. During editing, Welles showed a rough cut to the visiting head of the Cannes Film Festival, who immediately wanted to include the film in the festival, and Welles had to finish the editing more quickly than he preferred.

== Style ==
=== Cinematography ===
Welles originally wanted the entire film to use high-contrast cinematography, resembling engravings of the Middle Ages; only the opening title sequence uses this technique. The film's most famous sequence is the Battle of Shrewsbury; only about 180 extras were available and Welles used editing techniques to give the appearance of armies of thousands. Welles filmed all the battle scenes in long takes, but cut the shots into fragments to create the effect he wanted. It took ten days to shoot the scenes and six weeks to edit what became a six-minute sequence. In filming the sequence, Welles often used hand-held cameras, wide-angle lenses, slow motion and speed up shots, static shots, swish pans, and constant rapid movement of the characters to create a kinetic and chaotic atmosphere. Anderegg wrote, "in the end, both armies have become one huge, awkward, disintegrating war machine, a grotesque robot whose power source slowly begins to fail and finally comes to a frozen halt. Verbal rhetoric—language itself—seems, for the moment, both irrelevant and obscene."

Film critics have called the Battle of Shrewsbury sequence an anti-war statement and likened it to contemporary films like Dr. Strangelove and Culloden. Shakespearean scholar Daniel Seltzer said, "the social consciousness of the movie is as alert as Shakespeare's, and thematically pertinent in Shakespearean terms too ... the footage of the Battle of Shrewsbury itself must be some of the finest, truest, ugliest scenes of warfare ever shot and edited for a movie." Welles scholar James Naremore said, "the underlying eroticism of the chivalric code ... is exposed in all its cruel perversity." Tony Howard wrote that Welles used Shakespeare's historical plays "to denounce modern political hypocrisy and militarism."

=== Sound ===
Due to budgetary constraints, both the on-set and post-production sound was poorly recorded. Anderegg wrote that this, in combination with Welles's fast-paced camera movements and editing, makes the Shakespearean dialogue more difficult to understand. Many scenes are shot in long takes or with character's backs facing the camera, most likely for practical purposes when actors were not present, creating more sound problems. "In effect," Anderegg writes, "Welles generates a constant tension between what we see and what we hear, a tension that points to the ambiguous status of language in its relation to action." During the Battle of Shrewsbury sequence, Welles used a complex and layered soundtrack that included the sounds of swords and armor clanking, soldiers grunting and screaming, bones breaking, boots in the mud and the film's musical score to add to the scene's chaos.

=== Interpretation of Shakespeare ===
Welles's adaptation of five Shakespeare plays was not a chronological transcription. Shakespearean scholar Kenneth S. Rothwell said that Welles "goes beyond mere tinkering with Shakespeare's scenes; [he] massively reworks, transposes, revises and deletes, indeed reconstructs them." These changes included taking lines of dialogue from one play and inserting them into scenes from another. Specific changes include a scene near the end of the film in which Hal pardons an imprisoned street rabble-rouser just before his expedition to invade France; Welles slightly altered this scene from Henry V, Act 2, Scene 2. In the film this man is Falstaff, and the incident he is pardoning is Falstaff's disturbance of Hal's coronation. Although both the pardoned prisoner and Falstaff are said to drink wine, Shakespeare does not imply that the pardoned prisoner is Falstaff. In both Chimes at Midnight and in Henry V, this scene is followed by Falstaff's death. The film contains no true soliloquies, since characters are never alone and do not speak directly to the audience. Henry IV is usually shown standing or sitting with very little action involved—this, says Anderegg, makes it appear that he speaks only to himself even when others are present. Gielgud was known for his classical interpretation of Shakespeare, and his performance consists almost entirely of words, which are unable to defeat either Northumberland's rebels or Hal's wild behavior. Throughout the film, Falstaff, Hal, and Hotspur imitate Gielgud, mocking Henry IV's words.

== Release ==
=== Critical response ===
Chimes at Midnight premiered to a favorable audience reception at the 1966 Cannes Film Festival. But after New York Times critic Bosley Crowther's unfavorable advance review, American distributor Harry Saltzman decided to give the film little publicity and minimal distribution when it was released in the U.S. the next year. Critical reception on its first release was mostly negative; the film was not regarded as one of Welles's best until years later. Crowther criticized the film's poor audio track and called it "a confusing patchwork of scenes and characters ... designed to give major exposure to Jack Falstaff." Welles's performance, he wrote, was "a dissolute, bumbling street-corner Santa Claus." Penelope Houston called it "a film which seems to turn its back on brilliance." A Time review also criticized Welles, calling him "probably the first actor in the history of the theater to appear too fat for the role ... he takes command of scenes less with spoken English than with body English", but is "never entirely bad".

Judith Crist praised the film as "stark, simple, concentrating on word and performance, serv[ing] as a reminder of where the substance of the play lies." Pauline Kael also criticized the poor sound, but gave a favorable review overall, singling out the film's casting and calling Welles's performance "very rich, very full." She said the Battle of Shrewsbury sequence was "unlike any battle scene done on the screen before." Cahiers du Cinéma critic Serge Daney also praised both the film and Welles's ability to make great films on the subject of power. Welles was disappointed with the film's reception, complaining that "almost nobody has seen it in America, and that drives me nuts."

On the site Rotten Tomatoes, Chimes at Midnight has a "Certified Fresh" approval rating of 96% based on 50 reviews, with an average rating of 9.00/10. Metacritic, which uses a weighted average, assigned the film a score of 94 out of 100 based on 23 critics, indicating "universal acclaim".

=== Legacy ===
Welles held Chimes at Midnight in high regard. "It's my favorite picture, yes," he told interviewer Leslie Megahey in a 1982 interview for BBC Arena:

If I wanted to get into heaven on the basis of one movie, that's the one I would offer up. I think it's because it is to me the least flawed; let me put it that way. It is the most successful for what I tried to do. I succeeded more completely in my view with that than with anything else.

He also considered it his most personal film, along with The Magnificent Ambersons. Many critics, including Peter Bogdanovich and Jonathan Rosenbaum, also consider Chimes at Midnight Welles's finest work. Several years after its initial release, critic Vincent Canby of The New York Times wrote that Chimes at Midnight "may be the greatest Shakespearean film ever made, bar none." Joseph McBride has called it "Welles' masterpiece, the fullest, most completely realized expression of everything he had been working towards since Citizen Kane." In 2006, Roger Ebert, who had given the film a full 4/4 stars in 1968, called it "a magnificent film, clearly among Welles' greatest work".

The Battle of Shrewsbury sequence has been particularly admired, and inspired later movies, including Braveheart and Saving Private Ryan. Film critics have compared it to the Odessa Steps sequence in Battleship Potemkin and the Battle on the Ice sequence in Alexander Nevsky, both directed by Sergei Eisenstein. Kenneth Branagh's Henry V used Welles's Battle of Shrewsbury sequence as an inspiration for the Battle of Agincourt, and depicted Prince Hal's rejection of Falstaff in a way more influenced by Chimes at Midnight than by more traditional interpretations of the scene. In 1988, director Patrick Garland staged a version of Chimes at Midnight starring Simon Callow as Falstaff at the Chichester Festival Theatre. Michael Anderegg said that Chimes at Midnight's use of wide angle lenses, low-key lighting and costumes, and its focus on the relationship between Falstaff and Prince Hal influenced My Own Private Idaho—Gus Van Sant's 1991 loose adaptation of Henry IV Parts 1 and 2.

In 2011, Bonham's Auction House sold a large archive of Welles's material that had once belonged to the film's executive producer, Alessandro Tasca di Cuto. Most of the material was from Chimes at Midnight, and included Welles's original artwork, photographs, and memoranda. This collection was later donated to the University of Michigan for scholarly study.

In 2012, for the British Film Institute's Sight and Sound poll, 11 film critics and two directors voted Chimes at Midnight one of the 10 greatest films of all time, including McBride and Todd McCarthy.

In 2015, Spanish writer and director of the Film Library of Catalonia Esteve Riambau published a book about the film, The Things We've Seen: Welles and Falstaff.

=== Awards ===
At the 1966 Cannes Film Festival, Chimes at Midnight was screened in competition for the Palme d'Or and won the Technical Grand Prize (tied). Welles was nominated for a BAFTA award for Best Foreign Actor in 1968. In Spain, the film won the Citizens Writers Circle Award for Best Film in 1966.

=== Home media ===
Because of legal disputes over the rights, Chimes at Midnight has been released only twice on VHS video in the United States, and neither release is available. Harry Saltzman's widow Adriana Saltzman, the families of producers Emiliano Piedra and Angel Escolano and the estate of Orson Welles—maintained by Beatrice Welles— among others have all claimed ownership of the film. For many years the only available source was a region-free DVD from Brazil. Mr Bongo Records screened a restored version in the UK at Picturehouse Cinemas on August 1, 2011. In February 2015, the film screened at the Sedona International Film Festival. Beatrice Welles attended and announced that "a major DVD/Blu-ray label is interested in restoring and releasing Chimes at Midnight." The pristine 35mm print was discovered by Distribpix Inc., which said it was "in such great condition that it is begging for a full 4k scan restoration."

The film had a European release on DVD and Blu-ray on June 29, 2015.

=== 2016 restoration ===
Janus Films released a restored version of the film on D.C.P. that premiered on January 1, 2016, at Film Forum in New York City on January 1–12, 2016, and at Cinefamily in Los Angeles. This restored version is not derived from the Distribpix print. Peter Becker, Criterion's president, said the release is the product of more than 20 years of effort: "There is no film we have waited longer for or worked harder to free up, and none we are prouder to present", he said. Criterion released this restoration on DVD and Blu-ray on August 30, 2016.

== Welles and Falstaff ==
=== Welles's views on Sir John Falstaff ===
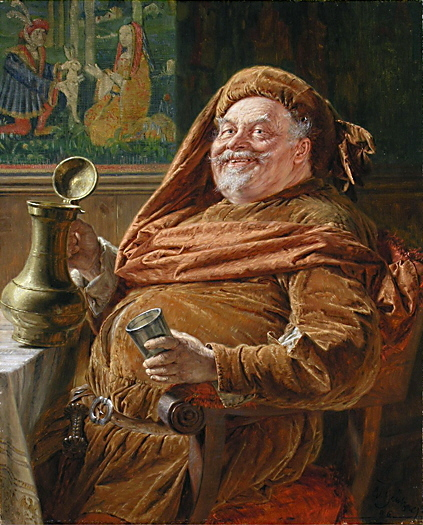
Eduard von Grützner's Falstaff with big wine jar and cup shows the traditional jolly and comical depiction of Falstaff that Welles rejected.

Welles considered Falstaff "Shakespeare's greatest creation" and said the role was "the most difficult part I ever played in my life." Baxter believed that making the film was Welles's life's ambition. Before the 1939 Boston premiere of Five Kings, Welles told journalists: "I will play him as a tragic figure. I hope, of course, he will be funny to the audience, just as he was funny to those around him. But his humor and wit were aroused merely by the fact that he wanted to please the prince. Falstaff, however, had the potential of greatness in him." Reviews of the 1939 play mention Welles's choice to downplay the traditional comedic elements of Falstaff in his performance. This reverence for the character increased over the years and by the time Welles made Chimes at Midnight, his focus was entirely on the relationships between Falstaff, Hal, and Henry IV. He believed the core of the story was "the betrayal of friendship." Welles called Hal's rejection of Falstaff "one of the greatest scenes ever written, so the movie is really a preparation for it. Everything prepares for it." Throughout the film, Hal repeatedly turns his back on Falstaff, foreshadowing the film's ending.

The film was not intended as a lament for Falstaff, but for the death of Merrie England. Merrie England as a conception, a myth which has been very real to the English-speaking world, and is to some extent expressed in other countries of the Medieval epoch: the age of chivalry, of simplicity, of Maytime and all that. It is more than Falstaff who is dying. It's the old England dying and betrayed. ~Orson Welles

Many film theorists and Welles biographers have written about the recurrent theme of the "Lost Eden" in Welles's work and of characters who are nostalgic for an idealized past, which Welles called "the central theme in Western culture." Welles told Peter Bogdanovich that "even if the good old days never existed, the fact that we can conceive of such a world is, in fact, an affirmation of the human spirit." Film scholar Beverle Houston argued that this nostalgia made Welles's depiction of Falstaff infantile and called his performance a "[p]ower baby ... an eating, sucking, foetus-like creature." Welles also called Falstaff "the greatest conception of a good man, the most completely good man, in all of drama", and said, "the closer I thought I was getting to Falstaff the less funny he seemed to me. When I played him before in the theater, he seemed more witty than comical. And in bringing him to the screen, I found him only occasionally, and only deliberately, a clown."

=== Welles's personal connections to Falstaff ===
"[Falstaff]'s good in the sense that the hippies are good. The comedy is all about gross faults in the man, but those faults are so trivial: his famous cowardice is a joke—a joke Falstaff seems to be telling himself against himself...he asks for so little, and in the end gets nothing." -Welles on Falstaff

Baxter compared Welles to Falstaff, since they were both perpetually short of money, often lied and cheated people to get what they needed, and were always merry and fun-loving. Film scholar Jack Jorgens also compared Welles to Falstaff, writing, "to a man who directed and starred in a masterpiece and has since staggered through three decades of underfinanced, hurried, flawed films, scores of bit parts, narrations, and interviews which debased his talent, dozens of projects which died for want of persistence and financing, the story of a fat, aging jester exiled from his audience and no longer able to triumph over impossible obstacles with wit and torrential imagination might well seem tragic." When Joss Ackland played Falstaff on the stage in 1982, he said he was more inspired by Welles than by Welles's performance as Falstaff: "like Falstaff, I believe he could have achieved so much, but it was frittered away." Kenneth S. Rothwell has called Hal's rejection of Falstaff allegorical to Hollywood's rejection of Welles. Welles had become deeply depressed in the late 1950s after the disappointment of making Touch of Evil, his intended Hollywood comeback.

Welles's biographer Simon Callow has compared Falstaff to Welles's father Richard Head Welles, writing that like Falstaff, Welles's father was "a drunkard, a trickster, a braggart, a womanizer, a gentleman and a charmer—and he is rejected by the person he loves the most." Welles's father was an alcoholic and womanizer who often took a teenage Welles along when indulging in his vices. Welles observed his father much like Hal observes Falstaff, who depends on his young protégé to bail him out of trouble. The love triangle between Hal and his two father figures, Henry IV and Falstaff, is also similar to Welles's relationships with his father and the two men who became surrogate fathers to him: family friend Maurice Bernstein and Todd School for Boys headmaster Roger Hill. Both of Welles's surrogate fathers disapproved of Richard Welles's lifestyle and influence on Welles. When the younger Welles turned 15, he took Hill's advice and told his father he would not see him again until he cleaned up his act and stopped drinking; Welles's father died shortly afterward, alone and lonely, and Welles blamed himself for his father's death, saying, "I always thought I killed him."

Welles's alleged biological son Michael Lindsay-Hogg, who was born to actress Geraldine Fitzgerald, first met Welles when he was 15 and later worked on the 1960 stage play Chimes at Midnight. This was the only significant amount of time the two spent together and Lindsay-Hogg saw Welles only sporadically thereafter. Like Welles, Lindsay-Hogg had two surrogate fathers in addition to his biological father. In the late 1950s, when she was 16, Welles's daughter Christopher Welles Feder cut off all ties with Welles under pressure from her mother, who disapproved of Welles's influence on her. Welles and Feder later reconnected but their relationship never fully recovered. Welles' youngest daughter, Beatrice, who resembled her father as a young boy, appears in the film version of Chimes at Midnight.

== See also ==
- Riambau, Esteve (2015). Las Cosas Que Hemos Visto: Welles y Falstaff (Things We Have Seen: Welles and Falstaff). Spain: Luces Galibo. ISBN 978-8-415-11734-6.
