= 58th Locarno Film Festival =

Film festival in Locarno, Switzerland

- Opening film: The Rising - Ballad Of Mangal Pandey directed by Ketan Mehta
- Location: Locarno, Switzerland
- Founded: 1946
- Awards: Golden Leopard: Nine Lives by Rodrigo García
- Artistic director: Irene Bignardi
- Festival date: Opening: 3 August 2005; Closing: 13 August 2005
- Website: LFF

Locarno Film Festival
- 59th 57th

The 58th Locarno Film Festival was held from 3 to 13 August 2005 in Locarno, Switzerland. There were 18 films in competition with a total of 38 countries represented across the entire festival. The opening film was The Rising - Ballad Of Mangal Pandey directed by Ketan Mehta, which was screened on the Piazza Grande, the open-air theater. There was a retrospective of the work of Orson Welles and one for the work of cinematographer Vittorio Storaro, who served on the festival jury this year. Storaro along with John Malkovich and Susan Sarandon received excellence awards from the festival. While, the Leopard of Honor was awarded to Abbas Kiarostami, Wim Wenders, Terry Gilliam for their career achievements.

This was Irene Bignardi's last year at the festival after serving five years as the artistic director. The following year her position was filled by Federic Marie.

The Golden Leopard, the festival's top prize, was awarded to Nine Lives by Rodrigo García, which had its international premiere at Locarno and was the only American film in competition.

== Official Jury ==
- Niki Karimi, Iranian actor
- Aparna Sen, Indian actor
- Enki Bilal Yugoslavian director
- Tsai Ming-liang, Taiwanese director
- Valerio Adami, Italian artist
- Vittorio Storaro, Italian cinematographer

== Sections ==
The following films were screened in these sections:

=== Piazza Grande ===
English Title	Original Title	Director(s)	Year	Production Country
Being John Malkovich		Spike Jonze	1999	USA
Dick Tracy (part of the Tribute to Storaro)		Warren Beatty	1990	USA
Don't Come Knocking		Wim Wenders	2005	Germany
Jo Siffert: Live Fast - Die Young		Men Lareida	2005	Switzerland
Macbeth		Orson Welles	1948	USA
Citizen Dog	Mah Nakorn	Wisit Sasanatieng	2004	Thailand
Merry Christmas, Mr. Lawrence		Nagisa Ōshima	1982	Great Britain, Japan, New Zealand
Murderball		Henry-Alex Rubin, Dana Adam Shapiro	2004	USA
Nashville		Robert Altman	1975	USA
On a Clear Day		Gaby Dellal	2004	Great Britain
Rag Tale		Mary McGuckian	2004	Great Britain
Rize		David LaChapelle	2005	USA
The Flyer		Fox Revel	2005	South Africa, Sweden
The Rising - Ballad of Mangal Pandey		Ketan Mehta	2005	India
Time Bandits		Terry Gilliam	1981	Great Britain
Village Football		Sainath Choudhury	2004	India
Zaina: Rider of the Atlas	Zaïna, Cavalière De L'Atlas	Bourlem Guerdjou	2005	France, Germany
Through the Olive Trees	Zir E Darakhtan É Zeyton	Abbas Kiarostami	1994	Iran, France

=== International Competition ===
International Competition

Original Title	English Title	Director(s)	Year	Production Country
20 Centímetros	20 Centimeters	Ramón Salazar	2005	Spain
3 Grad Kaelter	3 Degrees Kaelter	Florian Hoffmeister	2005	Germany
Antarmahal - Views From The Inner Chamber		Rituparno Ghosh	2005	India
Face Addict		Edo Bertoglio	2005	Italia, Switzerland
Familia	Family	Louise Archambault	2005	Canada
Fratricide	Fratricidal	Yilmaz Arslan	2005	Germany, Luxembourg, France
Keller-Teenage Wasteland		Eva Urthaler	2005	Austria, Germany, Italia
La Guerra Di Mario	Mario's War	Antonio Capuano	2005	Italia
La Neuvaine	The Novena	Bernard Émond	2005	Canada
Ma Hameh Khoubim - We Are All Fine		Bijan Mirbagheri	2005	Iran
MirrorMask		Dave McKean	2004	Great Britain, USA
Nine Lives		Rodrigo García	2004	USA
Riviera		Anne Villacèque	2005	France
Snow White			2005	Switzerland, Austria
The Piano Tuner Of Earthquakes		Brothers Quay	2005	Great Britain, Germany, France
Un Couple Parfait	A Perfect Couple	Nobuhiro Suwa	2005	France, Japan
Vendredi Ou Un Autre Jour - S(C)Eptique : Deuxième Partie : L'Orgueil	Friday or Another Day - S (c) Eptic: Second Part: Pride	Yvan Le Moine	2005	Belgium, France, Italia, Slovakia

=== Filmmakers of the Present ===
The Concorso Cineasti del Presente, also known as the Filmmakers of the Present Competition, showcases first and second feature films from emerging filmmakers.

Filmmakers of the Present

Original Title	English Title	Director(s)	Year	Production Country
9M2 Pour Deux	9m2 for Two	Joseph Césarini, Jimmy Glasberg	2005	France
Amour Neutre	Neutral Love	Pierre Coulibeuf	2005	France
Atos Dos Homens - Work In Progress - 2005	Acts of Men - Work in Progress - 2005	Kiko Goifman	2005	Brazil, Germany
Cartographie 2 / Les Arches	Cartography 2 / the Arches	Philippe Saire	2002	Switzerland
Cartographie 5 / Rue Centrale 17-19	Cartography 5 / Rue Centrale 17-19	Alain Margot	2004	Switzerland
Cartographie 6 / La Vallee De La Jeunesse	Cartography 6 / Youth Vallee	Fernand Melgar	2005	Switzerland
Chère Jacqueline...	Dear Jacqueline ...	Dominique De Rivaz	2005	Switzerland
Delo Osvobaja	The Work of Liberating	Damjan Kozole	2005	Slovenia
En La Cama	In Bed	Matías Bize	2005	Chile, Germany
Frankie		Fabienne Berthaud	2005	France
Fuori Vena	Out of Vein	Tekla Taidelli	2005	Italia
Gas		Luciano Melchionna	2005	Italia
Gisela		Isabelle Stever	2005	Germany
Historias Del Desencanto	Stories of Disenchantment	Alejandro Valle	2005	Mexico
In Un Altro Paese	In Another Country	Marco Turco	2005	Italia, France
J'Ai Besoin D'Air	I Need Air	Natacha Samuel	2005	France
L'Accord	The Agreement	Béatrice Guelpa, Nicolas Wadimoff	2005	Switzerland, France
Le Démon Du Passage	The Demon of the Passage	Pierre Coulibeuf	1995	France
Lonesome Jim		Steve Buscemi	2005	USA
Lost Paradise		Pierre Coulibeuf	2002	France
Monobloc		Luis Ortega	2005	Argentina, Netherlands
Nuit Noire	Dark Night	Oliver Smolders	2005	Belgium, Netherlands
Per Sempre	Forever	Alina Marazzi	2005	Switzerland
Petit Matin	Early in the Morning	S. Louis	2005	France
Sangue - La Morte Non Esiste	Blood - Death Does not Exist	Libero De Rienzo	2005	Italia
The Passenger		François Rotger	2005	France, Canada, Japan
Vandana		Lina Bertucci	2004	USA
White Terror		Daniel Schweizer	2005	Switzerland, France, Germany, Finland
Filmmakers of the Present - Video
Original title	English title	Director(s)	Year	Production country
Piccolo Sole. Vita E Morte Di Henri Crolla	Small Sun. Henri's Life and Death Collapses	Nino Bizzarri	2005	Italia

=== Open Doors ===
Open Doors - Maghreb

Original Title	English Title	Director(s)	Year	Production Country
A Casablanca Les Anges Ne Volent Pas	In Casablanca the Angels Do not Fly	Mohamed Asli	2004	Morocco
Ali Zaoua		Nabil Ayouch	2000	Morocco
Aliénations	Alienations	Malek Bensmaïl	2003	Algérie
Cousines	Cousins	Lyes Salem	2003	Algérie, France
El Kotbia	The Kotbia	Nawfel Saheb-Ettaba	2002	Tunisia
Histoire D'Une Rencontre	History of a Meeting		1980	Algérie
Jawhara - Fille De Prison	Jawhara - Prison Daughter	Saâd Chraibi	2004	Morocco
Kanzaman	Bloodzen	Barbara Galanti	2005	Italia
Keïd Ensa		Farida Benlyazid	1999	Morocco
Khorma, Le Crieur De Nouvelles	Khorma, the Crier of News	Jilani Saadi	2002	Tunisia
L'Arche Du Désert	The Desert Ark	Mohamed Chouikh	1998	Algérie
L'Enfant Endormi	The Sleeping Child	Jean-Jacques Andrien	2004	Morocco
La Chambre Noire	The Dark Room	Hassan Benjelloun	2004	Morocco
La Trace	The Trace	Néjia Ben Mabrouk		Tunisia
Le Prince Qui Contemplait Son Âme/Bab'Aziz	The Prince Who Contemplated His Soul/Bab'Aziz	Nacer Khemir	2005	Tunisia
Le Thé D'Ania	Ania's Tea	Saïd Ould Khelifa	2004	Algérie
Machaho	Fisher	Belkacem Hadjadj	1996	Algérie
Mémoire En Détention	Detention Memory	Jillali Ferhati	2004	Morocco
No Man'S Love		Nidhal Chatta	2000	Tunisia
Oranges		Mouzahem Yahia	2003	Algérie, France
Poupées D'Argile	Clay Dolls	Nouri Bouzid	2002	Tunisia
Satin Rouge	Red Satin	Raja Amari	2002	Tunisia
Tarfaya	Hinderer	Daoud Aoulad-Syad	2005	Morocco, France
Tenja		Hassan Legzouli	2004	France, Morocco
Un Rêve Algérien	An Algerian Dream	Jean-Pierre Lledo	2003	Algérie
Viva Cuba	Long Live Cuba	Juan Carlos Cremata Malberti	2005	France, Cuba

=== Leopards of Tomorrow ===
Leopards of Tomorrow (Pardi di Domani)

==== Special Program ====
Special Program - Leopards of Tomorrow
Avant Le Petit Déjeuner	Before Breakfast	Cristi Puiu	1995	Switzerland
Childish		Nadia Probst	2004	Switzerland
Corpo A Corpo	Melee	Giada Ghiringhelli	2004	Switzerland
Disko Bay	Disco Bay	Aurélie Doutre	2004	Switzerland
L'Hotel Balzac		Sarah Gabay	1998	Switzerland
La Donna Che Si Commuoveva Troppo	The Woman Who Was Too Moved	Thierry Moro	2005	Switzerland
La Grande Ruine	The Great Ruin	Gaëlle Rouard	1996	Switzerland
La Piscine	The Pool	Anita Holdener	1997	Switzerland
Les Courts De Kino Kabaret A Locarno. Exercice Collectif De Cinema Spontane - Auteurs Divers	Kino Kabaret's: Short Films in Locarno. Collective Exercise of Spontaneous Cinema	Various Authors		
Mort En Exil	Died in Exile	Mutlu Saray Ayten	2002	Switzerland
Pluk	Pick	Iuri Rigo	2001	Switzerland
Qui Pleure?	Who is Crying?	Demis Herenger	2000	Switzerland
Screaming Jesus		Barbara Lehnhoff	2005	Switzerland
Self Portrait-Trilogia	Self Portrait-Trilogy	Claudine Appenzeller	2004	Switzerland
Verofalso		Exercise pratique réalisé par les élèves de 3eme du CISA, giuidé par Gianfilippo Pedote	2005	Switzerland

==== African Competition ====
Leopards of Tomorrow - Africa Competition
Original Title	English Title	Director(s)	Year	Production Country
Africains Poids Moyens	Africans Average Weight	Daniel Cattier	2004	Belgium
Afrique Annees 60	Africa 60s	Felicité Wouassi	2003	France
Aligato	Spark	Maka Sidibé	2003	France
Amal		Ali Benkirane	2004	France
Au-Déla Du Temps	Time of Time	Jean-Chris Banange Semutakirwa	2004	France
Beit Min Lahm	Work Min Lame	Rami Abdul Jabbar	2005	Egypt
By Foot		Kai Adam	2004	Germany
Clandestin	Clandestine	Philippe Larue	2003	France
Enharda Talateen November		Mahmood Soliman	2005	Egypt
Exoticore		Nicolas Provost	2004	Belgium
Ibali	The Story	Harold Holscher	2003	South Africa
L'Évangile Du Cochon Créole	The Gospel of the Creole Pig	Michelange Quay	2004	France
La Femme Seule	The Woman Alone	Brahim Fritah	2005	France
Lahna Lalhih		Rachid Boutounes	2004	France
Manmuswak	Manmuskaq	Patrick Bernier, Olive Martin	2005	France
Mitterand Est Mort	Mitterrand is Dead	Hedi Sassi	2003	France
Pour La Nuit	For the Night	Isabelle Boni-Claverie	2004	France
Pourquoi ?	For What ?	Sokhna Amar	2005	Senegal
Rencontre En Ligne	Online Meeting	Adama Roamba	2005	France
Riding With Sugar		Sunu Gonera	2005	South Africa
Rumeur, Etc.	Rumor, Etc.	Mohamed Latrèche	2003	France
Sa/X		Gilli Apter	2004	South Africa
Signe D'Appartenance	Membership		2004	France
The One That Fits Inside The Bathtub		Inger Smith	2004	South Africa
Visa		Ibrahim Letaief	2004	Tunisia
Yom El-Ethneen		Tamer El Said	2004	Egypt
Africa Retrospective
Aid El Kebir	Big Feast	Karin Albou	1998	France
Black Sushi		Dean Blumberg	2002	South Africa
Bol D'Amour	Love Bowl	Jacques Trabi	2000	France
C' Était Pas La Guerre	It Was not War	Alexandrine Brisson	2002	France
Chiens Errants	Wandering Dogs	Jean-Jacques Andrien	1995	Belgium
Feizou Laowai	Fe i Walk LA o Outside	Josef Kumbela	1998	France
Inja	Dog	Steven Pasvolsky	2001	Australia
L'Éxposé	The Exposed	Ismael ferroukhi	1992	France
La Poule Aux Oeufs D'Or	The Golden Egg Hen	Bassec ba Kobhio	1996	Cameroon
Le Chameau Et Les Batons Flottants	The Camel and the Floating Sticks	Abderrahmane Sissako	1996	Mauritania
Le Jeu	The Game	Abderrahmane Sissako	1990	Mauritania
Le Retour De La Main Habile	The Skillful Hand Return	Tahirou Tasséré Ouédraogo	2002	Burkina Faso
Les Pierres Bleues Du Désert	The Blue Stones of the Desert	Nabil Ayouch	1993	France
Lilly		Marwan Hamed	2000	Egypt
One Sunday Morning		Manu Kurewa	1996	Great Britain
Petite Lumière	Small Light	Alain Gomis	2002	Senegal
Portrait Of A Young Man Drowning		Tebogo Mahlatsi	1999	South Africa
Quand Le Soleil Fait Tomber Les Moineaux	When the Sun Drops the Sparrows	Hassan Legzouli	1999	France
Raya		Zulfah Ott-Sallies	2001	South Africa
Rue Bleue	Blue Street	Chad Chenouga	1998	France
Souko	Warehouse	Issiaka Konaté	1998	Burkina Faso
The Foreigner		Zola Mazeko	1997	South Africa
The Sky In Her Eyes		Madoda Ncayiyana, Ouita Smit	2002	South Africa
Ubuntu'S Wounds		Sechaba Morojele	2002	USA
Une Femme Pour Souleymane	A Woman for Souleymane	Dyana Gaye	2000	Senegal
West Al Balad		Amir Ramses	2000	Egypt
Yom El-Ahad El-Aadi	Normal Sunday	Saad Hendawy	1995	Egypt

==== Swiss Competition ====
Swiss Competition – Leopards of Tomorrow (Pardi di Domani)
Original Title	English Title	Director(s)	Year	Production Country
Concluzie	Conclusion	Gabriel Sandru	2005	Switzerland
Der Ausflug	The Excursion	Christina Zulauf	2004	Switzerland
Der Skifahrer	The Skier	Martin Guggisberg	2005	Switzerland
Des Bras Trop Courts	Too Short Arms	Marie-Eve Hildbrand	2004	Switzerland
Domaine Privé	Private Domain	Rafael Wolf	2005	Switzerland
Dors Sophie, Dors		Zoya Anastassova	2005	Switzerland
Déjeuner Sur L'Eau	Lunch on the Water	Isabelle Blanc	2005	Switzerland
Frohe Ostern	Happy Easter	Ulrich Schaffner	2005	Switzerland
Geneva And Me		Bernie Forster	2004	Switzerland
Haru Ichiban-Frühligssturm	Haru Ichiban Spring Tower	Aya Domenig	2005	Switzerland
Herr Goldstein		Micha Lewinsky	2005	Switzerland
Kalte Haut	Cold Skin	Sebastian Kutzli	2005	Germany
La Limace	The Slug	Anthony Vouardoux, Tania Zambrano Ovalle	2005	Switzerland
Le Beau-Frère	The Brother-in-Law	Thierry Moro	2005	Switzerland
Le Tramway D'Andréa	Andréa's Tramway	Alex Iordachescu, Alexandre Lordachescu	2005	Switzerland
Romance Mayonnaise			2005	Switzerland
Staila Crudanta	Stila Rudy	Pascal Bergamin	2005	Switzerland
Terra Incognita	Unknown Land	Peter Volkart	2005	Switzerland
Visite Medicale	Medical Visit	Felix von Muralt	2005	Switzerland

=== Tribute To – Vittorio Storaro ===
Tribute To Vittorio Storaro
English Title	Original Title	Director(s)	Year	Production Country
'Tis Pity She's a Whore	Addio, Fratello Crudele	Giuseppe Patroni Griffi	1971	Italia
Giordano Bruno		Giuliano Montaldo	1973	Italia, France
Youth March	Giovinezza, Giovinezza	Franco Rossi	1969	Italia
The Spider's Stratagem	La Strategia Del Ragno	Bernardo Bertolucci	1970	Italia
One from the Heart		Francis Ford Coppola	1982	USA
Tango		Carlos Saura	1998	Spain

=== Retrospective - Orson Welles ===
Retrospective - The Magnificent Welles
Original Title	English Title	Director(s)	Year	Production Country
12 + 1	The Thirteen Chairs	Nicolas Gessner	1969	Italia
Black Magic		Gregory Ratoff	1949	USA
Brunnen	Spring	Kristian Petri	2005	Sweden
Chimes at Midnight		Orson Welles	1965	Spain, Switzerland
Citizen Kane		Orson Welles	1941	USA
Citizen of America: Orson Welles and the Ballad of Isaac Woodard (Work in Progress)		Robert Fischer	2005	Germany
Commercials & Specials		Orson Welles		
Compulsion		Richard Fleischer	1959	USA
Mr. Arkadin		Orson Welles	1955	USA
Crack in the Mirror		Richard Fleischer	1960	USA
David E Golia	David and Goliath	Richard Pottier	1959	Italia, USA
F for Fake		Orson Welles	1973	France, Germany, Iran
Filming Othello		Orson Welles	1978	USA, Germany
Filming The Trial		Orson Welles	1981	USA
Hit-A-Sin Rain		Ann Goodman, H. Hoffman	1978	
I'll Never Forget What's'isname		Michael Winner	1967	Great Britain
Jane Eyre		Robert Stevenson	1943	USA
Journey Into Fear		Norman Foster, Orson Welles	1943	USA
King Lear Versions		Andrew McCullough, Orson Welles		USA
L'Homme Qui A Vu L'Homme Qui A Vu L'Ours	The Man Who Saw the Man Who Saw the Bear	André S. Labarthe	1989	France
La Décade Prodigieuse	Ten Days' Wonder	Claude Chabrol	1971	Italia, France
La ricotta		Pier Paolo Pasolini	1963	Italia, France
Linguagem De Orson Welles	Orson Welles Language	Rogério Sganzerla	1991	Brazil
London		Orson Welles	1955	Great Britain
Lord Mountdrago		George More O'Ferrall	1954	Great Britain
Lucy Meets Orson Welles		James V. Kern	1956	USA
Madrid: The Bullfight		Orson Welles	1955	Great Britain
Malpertuis		Harry Kümel	1971	Belgium
Man In The Shadow		Jack Arnold	1958	USA
O Signo Do Caos	The Sign of Chaos	Rogério Sganzerla	2003	Brazil
Orson Welles En El Pais De Don Quijote	Orson Welles in Don Quijote's Country	Carlos Eduardo Rodrigues	2000	Spain
Orson Welles On Stage In Dublin		Orson Welles	1960	Great Britain
Orson Welles Sells His Soul To The Devil		Jay Bushman	1999	USA
Orson Welles Talks With Roger Hill		Orson Welles	1978	USA
Orson Welles Uncut		Francoise Levie	2005	Belgium
Orson Welles À La Cinématheque Francaise	Orson Welles with French Cinematheca	Guy Seligman	1982	France
Orson Welles' Jeremiah		Orson Welles	1978	USA
Orson Welles' London		Orson Welles		Great Britain, Italia
Orson Welles' Shylock		Orson Welles		USA, Italia, Spain
Orson Welles' Sketch Book		Orson Welles	1955	Great Britain
Orson Welles' Sketch Book I		Orson Welles	1955	Great Britain
Orson Welles' Sketch Book II		Orson Welles	1955	Great Britain
Orson Welles' Sketch Book III		Orson Welles	1955	Great Britain
Orson Welles' Sketch Book IV		Orson Welles	1955	Great Britain
Orson Welles' Sketch Book V		Orson Welles	1955	Great Britain
Orson Welles' Sketch Book VI		Orson Welles	1955	Great Britain
Orson Welles' The Golden Honeymoon		Orson Welles	1970	USA
Orson Welles' Vienna		Orson Welles	1969	Austria, Italia
Orson Welles		François Reichenbach, Frédéric Rossif	1968	France
Othello		Orson Welles	1952	USA, Italia, Morocco
Paris After Dark		Orson Welles	1955	Great Britain
Prince Of Foxes		Henry King	1949	USA
Return to Glennascaul		Hilton Edwards	1951	Great Britain
RKO 281		Benjamin Ross	1999	Great Britain
In the Land of Don Quixote		Orson Welles	1961	Italia
In the Land of Don Quixote I: Itinerario Andaluso (Andalusian Itinerary)		Orson Welles	1961	Italia
In the Land of Don Quixote II: Spagna Santa (Holy Week in Spain)		Orson Welles	1961	Italia
In the Land of Don Quixote III: La Fiera Di San Fermin (The San Fermin Fair)		Orson Welles	1961	Italia
In the Land of Don Quixote IV: L'Encierro Di Pamplona (The Running of the Bulls in Pamplona)		Orson Welles	1961	Italia
In the Land of Don Quixote V: Le Cantine Di Jerez (Canteen of Jerez)		Orson Welles	1961	Italia
In the Land of Don Quixote VI: Siviglia (Seville)		Orson Welles	1961	Italia
In the Land of Don Quixote VII: Feria De Abril A Siviglia (Seville April Fair )		Orson Welles	1961	Italia
In the Land of Don Quixote VIII: Tempo Di Flamenco (Flamenco Time)		Orson Welles	1961	Italia
In the Land of Don Quixote IX: Roma E Oriente In Spagna (Rome and the East on Spain)		Orson Welles	1961	Italia
Rosabella: La Storia Italiana Di Orson Welles	Rosabella: The Italian History of Orson Welles	Gianfranco Giagni, Ciro Giorgini	1993	Italia
Someone To Love		Henry Jaglom	1987	USA
Tepepa	Blood and Guns	Giulio Petroni	1968	Italia, Spain
The Dominici Affair by Orson Welles		Christophe Cognet	1999	France
The Fountain of Youth		Orson Welles	1956	USA
The Hearts of Age		William Vance, Orson Welles	1934	USA
The Immortal Story		Orson Welles	1968	France
The Lady from Shanghai		Orson Welles	1948	USA
The Land of Basques I		Orson Welles	1955	Great Britain
The Magnificent Ambersons		Freddie Fleck, Jack Moss, Orson Welles, Robert Wise	1942	USA
The Magnificent Orson Welles		Jeff Meyers	2002	USA
The Night that Panicked America		Joseph Sargent	1975	USA
The Orson Welles Show		Orson Welles	1978	USA
The Orson Welles Story		Leslie Megahey	1982	Great Britain
The Other Side of Welles		Daniel Rafaelic, Leon Rizmaul	2005	Croatia
The Southern Star		Sidney Hayers	1969	Great Britain, France
The Spirit of Charles Lindbergh		Orson Welles	1984	USA
The Stranger		Orson Welles	1946	USA
The Third Man		Carol Reed	1949	Great Britain
Shadowing The Third Man		Frederic Baker	2005	Great Britain, Austria, France
Treasure Island		John Hough	1972	Great Britain
The Trial		Orson Welles	1962	France, Italia, Germany, Yugoslavia
Touch of Evil		Orson Welles	1958	USA
Viva Italia		Orson Welles	1956	USA

=== Welles Retrospective (Workshop) ===
Original Title	English Title	Director(s)	Year	Production Country
Around the World with Orson Welles		Orson Welles	1955	Great Britain
Around The World With Orson Welles I		Orson Welles	1955	Great Britain
Around The World With Orson Welles II		Orson Welles	1955	Great Britain
Around The World With Orson Welles III		Orson Welles	1955	Great Britain
Around The World With Orson Welles IV		Orson Welles	1955	Great Britain
Around The World With Orson Welles V		Orson Welles	1955	Great Britain
Don Quixote De Orson Welles	Don Quixote by Orson Welles	Jess Franco	1993	
Isak Dinesen/Orson Welles' The Dreamers		Orson Welles		
It's All True / It's All True: Based On An Unfinished Film By Orson Welles		Bill Krohn, Myron Meisel, Richard Wilson	1993	France, USA
Rushes From It's All True		Orson Welles	1993	
King Lear New York		Orson Welles	1956	
King Lear Tape		Orson Welles	1983	France
King Lear		Andrew McCullough	1953	USA
Moby Dick Tv Speech			1970	
Moby Dick/Orson Welles' Moby Dick		Orson Welles	1971	
Mr. Arkadin/Mr. Arkadin - New Version		Orson Welles	1955	
My Friend Bonito		Orson Welles	1942	
Nella Terra Di Don Chisciotte	In the Land of Don Quixote	Orson Welles	1961	Italia
Outtakes From Don Quixote		Orson Welles		
Scenes From Don Quixote		Orson Welles	1970	
Orson Welles At Magic Castle		Tom Trbovich	1978	
Orson Welles' Sketch Book		Orson Welles	1955	Great Britain
Orson Welles' Sketch Book V		Orson Welles	1955	Great Britain
Orson Welles' The Magic Show		Orson Welles		
Rushes From The Magic Show		Orson Welles		
Othello (Restored Version)		Orson Welles	1952	
Radio Days/The War Of The Worlds		Orson Welles	1938	
The Deep Rough Cut		Orson Welles		
The Deep/The Deep - Rough Cut		Orson Welles		
The Magnificent Ambersons		Orson Welles	1942	
The Magnificent Ambersons Reconstruction		Orson Welles	1942	
The Mercury Wonder Show		Edward S. Sutherland	1944	USA
The Other Side Of The Wind (unfinished)		Orson Welles		
Scenes The Other Side Of the Wind		Orson Welles		
Tutta La Verità Su G. Arkadin	All the Truth About G. Arkadin	Ciro Giorgini	1991	

=== Human Rights Program ===
Original Title	English Title	Director(s)	Year	Production Country
After Innocence		Jessica Sanders	2004	USA
Alive In Limbo		Hrafnhildur Gunnarsdottir, Erica Marcus, Tina Naccache	2004	USA, Lebanon, Iceland
Article 61		Mahvash Sheikholeslami	2005	Iran
Bride Kidnapping In Kyrgyzstan		Petr Lom	2004	Kyrgyzstan
Et Sheaava Nafshi - Keep Not Silent		Ilil Alexander	2004	Israel
Faces Of Change		Michèle Stephenson	2005	USA, Brazil, Mauritania, India, Bulgaria, South Africa
In The Morning		Danielle Laurie	2004	USA
L'Abbraccio Di Barbara	Barbara's Embrace	Annamaria Gallone	2005	Italia
Land Mines		Denis O'Rourke	2005	Australia, Afghanistan
Little Birds		Takeharu Watai	2005	Japan, Iraq
Living Rights: Lena		Duco Tellegen	2004	Netherlands
Living Rights: Roy		Duco Tellegen	2004	Netherlands
Living Rights: Toti		Duco Tellegen	2004	Netherlands
Living Rights: Yoshi		Duco Tellegen	2004	Netherlands
Paint Me A Life		Stefano Knuchel, Ivan Nurchis	2005	Switzerland
Pinocchio Nero	Pinocchio Black	Angelo Loy	2005	Italia
Powerful Men		Fulvio Bernasconi	2005	Switzerland
The Stranger		Sainath Choudhury	2004	India
Troop 1500		Karen Bernstein, Ellen Spiro	2005	USA
Voices Of Iraq		Habitants d'Iraq	2004	Iraq, USA

=== In Progress ===
Original Title	English Title	Director(s)	Year	Production Country
11.45.03		Jacopo Bedogni, Nicolo Massazza	2004	Italia
3'		Teresa Hubbard & Alexander Birchler, Doug Aitken, Yang Fudong, Isaac Julien, Sarah Morris, Philippe Parreno, Anri Sala, Markus Schinwald, RothStauffenberg	2004	Germany
A Serpente	To Serpente	Sandro Aguilar	2005	Portugal
All People Is Plastic		Harald Hund	2005	Austria
Baltimore		Isaac Julien	2003	Great Britain
Christo In Paris		Deborah Dickson, Susan Froemke, Albert Maysles	1990	USA
Christo'S Valley Curtain		Ellen Hovde, Albert Maysles	1974	USA
Closer To Fall		Tim White-Sobieski	2005	USA
Correspondances	Correspondence	Christophe Atabekian	2005	France
E=Nyc2		Kimi Takesue	2005	USA
Erni	Land	Edgar Honetschläger	2005	Austria
F For Fake		Filipa César	2005	Germany
Gelo Verticale	Vertical Frost	Jacopo Bedogni, Nicolo Massazza	2004	Italia
Invisible Cities No1		Jonas Dahlberg	2004	Sweden
Islands		Albert Maysles, Charlotte Zwerin	1986	USA
L'Art De La Fugue	The Art of Fugue	Altinai Petrovitch Njegosh	2005	France
Le Corps Silencieux	The Silent Body	Emmanuel Vantillard	2005	France
Les Inconstances Du Papillon	The Inconstances of the Butterfly	Martin Le Chevallier	2005	France
Ligne Verte	Green Line	Laurent Mareschal	2005	France
Looking For Alfred		Johan Grimonprez	2005	Belgium, Great Britain
Met Losse Handen	Loose Hands	Marijke Van Warmerdam	2004	Netherlands
Nachtnebel	Night Fog	Barbara Schärf	2005	Austria
Notte 266	Night 266	Jacopo Bedogni, Nicolo Massazza	2004	Italia
Numbered		Christina Benz	2005	Switzerland
Paradise Omeros		Isaac Julien	2003	Great Britain
Paris-Mediterannee		Pierre Reimer	2004	France
Pending		Christina Benz	2004	Switzerland, Great Britain
Petroleo Mexico	MEXICO PETROLEO	Roberto Paci Daló	2005	Italia
Plus Loin Que La Nuit	Further than Night	Robert Cahen	2005	France
Pour Finir Ici	Finally	Sébastien Caillat	2005	France
Quodlibet	Any	Ila Bêka	2005	Italia
Running Fence		Albert Maysles, Charlotte Zwerin	1978	USA
Shesh Video Arts		Mina Akbari	2005	Iran
Sisma	Earthquake	Émilie Deleuze, Fabrice Hyber	2005	France
Sisters, Saints And Sybils		Nan Goldin	2004	France
Site Specific - Las Vegas 05		Olivo Barbieri	2005	USA, Canada
Solitaire, Pauvre, Sordide, Abrutie Et Courte - Film De Guerre	Lonely, Poor, Sordid, Abruption and Short - War Film	Wagner Morales	2005	France
Soltanto Essere	Just Being	Jacopo Bedogni, Nicolo Massazza	2005	Italia
Summer Of '85		Rowan Al Faqih	2005	Switzerland
Sur La Terre	On Earth	Ariane Michel	2005	France
Sweep		Richard Billingham	2004	Great Britain
Swimming Off Off		Sabrina Acciari	1999	Italia
Terminal Heart		Tim White-Sobieski	2004	USA
Territory I, Ii, Iii		Marine Hugonnier	2004	Great Britain
The Gates - Work In Progress		Antonio Ferrera, Albert Maysles	2005	USA
The Lake		Christina Benz	2004	Switzerland
Trenink		Pierre Reimer	2004	France
True North		Isaac Julien	2004	Great Britain
Ukiyo (Floating World)		Denis Dercourt	2005	France
Umbrellas		Henry Corra, Albert Maysles, Graham Weinbren	1995	USA
Unexpected Rules		Frédéric Moser, Philippe Schwinger	2004	Switzerland
Wall		Catherine Yass	2004	Israel
Week-End		Pierre Reimer	2003	France
Zivilisationsfloss	Civilization Flowed	Cornelia Heusser	2005	Switzerland
Zona Grigia E Zone Sconosciute	Gray Area and Unknown Areas	Sabrina Acciari	2001	Italia

=== Soy Cuba ===
Original Title	English Title	Director(s)	Year	Production Country
Soy Cuba, O Mamute Siberiano	I am Cuba, the Siberian mammoth	Vicente Ferraz	2004	Brazil
Soy Cuba	I Am Cuba	Mikhail Kalatozov	1964	Soviet Union, Cuba

=== Video Competition ===
Original Title	English Title	Director(s)	Production Country
0.58		Vincenzo Marra	Italia
A Coat Of Snow		Gordy Hoffman	USA
Bania	Cupola	David Teboul	France
Between The Devil And The Wide Blue Sea		Romuald Karmakar	Germany
Bosques	Forests	José Campusano, Gianfranco Quattrini	Argentina
Coma		Mike Figgis, Coma Group	Slovenia, Great Britain, Germany, Spain
Hao Duo Da Mi (So Much Rice)		Li Hongqi	China
Haze		Shinya Tsukamoto	Japan
Hidden Inside The Mountains		Laurie Anderson	USA
Lavoratori	Workers	Tommaso Cotronei	Italia
Les États Nordiques	Nordic States	Denis Côté	Canada
Ljubav Na Granici	Love on the Border	Miroslav Ciro Mandic	Bosnia and Herzegovina, Czech Republic
Magician(S)		Il-gon SONG	South Korea
Masahista	The Masseur	Brillante Mendoza	Philippines
Raccionepeccui		Giuseppe Bertolucci	Switzerland
Raiees Jomhour Mir Qanbar	President of the Fans of Mir Tanbur	Mohammad Shirvani	Iran
Revival Paradise		Frédéric Moser, Philippe Schwinger	Switzerland, Poland
Shooting Magpies		Amber production team	Great Britain
Sleepless Nights		Brian Fung	Hong Kong
Sperrstunde	Barrier	Thomas Woschitz	Austria
Volver La Vista	Look Back	Fridolin Schönwiese	Austria, Mexico
Worldly Desires		Apichatpong Weerasethakul	South Korea

=== Video Competition 95-05 ===
Video Competition 95–05
Original Title	English Title	Director(s)	Year	Production Country
Amber City		Jem Cohen	1999	Italia, USA
Cantata De Las Cosas Solas	Cantata of Things Alone	Willi Behnisch		Argentina
Chère Catherine	Dear Catherine	Raoul Peck	1997	Haiti
Cinema, De Notre Temps: Mosso Mosso (Jean Rouch Comme Si...),	Cinema, of Our Time: Mosso Mosso (Jean Rouch as if ...),	Jean-André Fieschi	1998	France
Conversations De Salon 1 - 2 - 3	Living Room Conversations 1 - 2 - 3	Danielle Arbid	2004	France
Dukhovnye Golosa	Spiritual Voices	Alexander Sokurov	1995	Russia
Ixieme, Journal D'Un Prisonnier	Ixieme, a Prisoner's Newspaper	Stéphane Blok, Pierre-Yves Borgeaud	2003	Switzerland
Les Yeux Fermés	Eyes Closed	Olivier Py	1999	France
Lost Book Found		Jem Cohen	1996	USA
Love And Diane		Jennifer Dworkin	2002	USA, France
Nocni Hovory S Matkou	Night Calls with Mother	Jan Němec	2001	Czech Republic

== Independent Sections ==
=== Critics Week ===
The Semaine de la Critique is an independent section, created in 1990 by the Swiss Association of Film Journalists in partnership with the Locarno Film Festival.

Original Title	English Title	Director(s)	Production Country
Between The Lines		Thomas Wartmann	Germany
Blau		Stefan Kälin, Norbert Wiedmer	Switzerland
Gambit		Sabine Gisiger	Switzerland, Germany
Geschlossene Gesellschaft	Closed Society	Andrei Schwartz	Germany, France
My Date With Drew		Jon Gunn, Brian Herzlinger, Brett Winn	USA
War'N Sie Schon Mal In Mich Verliebt?	Have you Ever Been in Love with Me?	Douglas Wolfsperger	Germany, Austria
Wie Luft Zum Atmen	Like Air to Breathe	Ruth Olshan	Germany

=== Swiss Cinema ===
Swiss Cinema Rediscovered
Original Title	English Title	Director(s)	Year	Production Country
Churer Fastnacht Umzug I. März 1927	Chur Carnival Parade In. March 1927		1927	Switzerland
Landammann Stauffacher		Leopold Lindtberg	1941	Switzerland
Mittelholzers Afrikaflug Ii - Kilimandscharo-Flug	Mittelholzer's Africa II - Kilimanjaro Flight	Walter Mittelholzer	1927	Switzerland

==== Appellation Swiss ====
Original Title	English Title	Director(s)	Year	Production Country
Die Vogelpredigt Oder Das Schreien Der Mönche	The Bird Sermon or the Screaming of the Monks	Clemens Klopfenstein	2005	Switzerland
Im Nordwind	In the North Wind	Bettina Oberli	2004	Switzerland
Katzenball	Cat Ball	Veronika Minder	2005	Switzerland
Klingenhof		Beatrice Michel	2005	Switzerland
La Nébuleuse Du Coeur	The Nebula of the Heart	Jacqueline Veuve	2005	Switzerland
Maria Bethânia, Música É Perfume	Maria Bethânia, Music is Perfume	Georges Gachot	2005	Switzerland
Nicolas Bouvier 22 Hospital Street		Christoph Kuehn	2005	Switzerland
Nocturne		Riccardo Signorell	2004	Switzerland
Ricordare Anna	Remember Anna	Walo Deuber	2005	Switzerland
Tout Un Hiver Sans Feu	A Whole Winter without Fire	Greg Zglinski	2004	Switzerland

== Official Awards ==
=== International Competition ===
- Golden Leopard: Nine Lives directed by Rodrigo García
- Silver Leopard: Fratricide directed by Yilmaz Arslan, 3 Grad Kaelter directed by Florian Hoffmeister (ex aequo), Ma Hameh Khoubim (We Are All Fine) directed by Bijan Mirbagheri (ex aequo)
- Leopard for Best Actress: Robin Wright Penn, Amanda Seyfried, Sissy Spacek, Holly Hunter, Lisa Gay Hamilton, Glenn Close, Elpidio Carrillo, Amy Brenneman, and Kathy Baker in NINE LIVES
- Leopard for Best Actor: Patrick Drolet in LA NEUVAINE
- Special Jury Prize: Un Couple Parfait directed by Nobuhiro Suwa
- Special Mention, official Jury: The Piano Tuner Of Earthquakes directed by Quay Brothers
- Special Mention, Official Jury, Young Actors: Marco Grieco in LA GUERRA DI MARIO, Xevat Gecat in FRATRICIDE

=== Piazza Grande ===
- Prix du Public UBS: ZAÏNA, CAVALIÈRE DE L'ATLAS directed by Bourlem Guerdjou

=== Leopards of Tomorrow competition ===
- Golden Leopard, SRG SSR idée Suisse, New Swiss Talents:
- Silver Leopard, Eastman Kodak Company Prize, New Swiss Talents: La Limace directed by Anthony Vouardoux and Tania Zembrano Ovalle
- Action "Light Prize" for the Best Swiss Newcomer: Frohe Ostern directed by Ulrich Schaffner
- Golden Leopard, SRG SSR idée Suisse Prize, "Africa" Competition: L'ÉVANGILE DU COCHON CRÉOLE directed by Michelange Quay
- Silver Leopard, Eastman Kodak Company Prize, "Africa" Competition: Sa/X directed by Gilli Apter
- Film and Video Subtitling Prize, "Africa" Competition: Enharda Talateen November directed by Mahmood Soliman
- Special Mention, Leopards of Tomorrow, New Swiss Talents: Staila Crudanta directed by Pascal Bergamin
- Special Mention, Film and Video Subtitling Prize, "Africa" Competition: POURQUOI? directed by Sokhna Amar
- Youth Jury Prize, short films, "Africa" Competition: POURQUOI? directed by Sokhna Amar

=== Youth Jury ===
- First Prize, Youth Jury: Nine Lives directed by Rodrigo García
- Second Prize, Youth Jury Prize: 20 CENTÍMETROS directed by Ramón Salazar
- Third Prize, Youth Jury: Fratricide directed by Yilmaz Arslan
- "The environnement is the quality of life" Prize: Le Neuvaine directed by Bernard Émond
- First Mention, Youth Jury: The Piano Tuner Of Earthquakes directed by Quay Brothers
- Second Mention, Youth Jury: Mirrormask directed by Dave McKean

=== Video Competition Jury ===
- Golden Leopard Video C.P Company: Les ÉTATS NORDIQUES directed by Denis Côté, Masahista directed by Brillante Mendoza
- Special Mention, Video Competition: Between The Devil And The Wide Blue Sea directed by Romuald Karmakar

=== Ecumenical Jury ===
- Special Mention, Oecumenical Jury: Fratrcide directed by Yilmaz Arslan

=== FIPRESCI Jury ===
- FIPRESCI Prize: A Perfect Day directed by Joana Hadjithomas and Khalil Joreige

=== CICAE – Art & Essai Jury ===
- CICAE Prize: Un Couple Parfait directed by Nobuhiro Suwa

=== Human Rights Award Jury ===
- Human Rights Prize: Little Birds directed by Takeharu Watai
- Special Mention, Human Rights: Living Rights: Toti directed by Duco Tellegen, Alive In Limbo directed by Tina Naccache, Hrafnhildur Gunnarsdottir and Erica Marcus

=== NETPAC (Network for the Promotion of Asian Cinema) Jury ===
- NETPAC Prize: Hao Duo Da Mi (So Much Rice) directed by Li Hongqi
- NETPAC Special Prize: The Rising – BALLAD OF MANGL PANDEY directed by Ketan Mehta

=== FICC Jury ===
- Don Quijote Prize: A Perfect Day directed by Joana Dadjithomas and Khalil Joreige
- Special Mention, FICC Jury: Ma Hameh Khoubim (We Are All Fine) directed by Bijan Mirbagheri, Nine Lives directed by Rodrigo García

=== SRG SSR idée suisse | Semaine de la critique Prize ===
- SRG SSR idée Suisse Prize, Critics Week: Gambit directed by Karin Koch
- Special Mention, Critic Week Jury: My Date With Drew directed by Brett Winn, Brian Herzlinger and Jon Gunn
