= Bibiana Beglau =

German actress (born 1971)

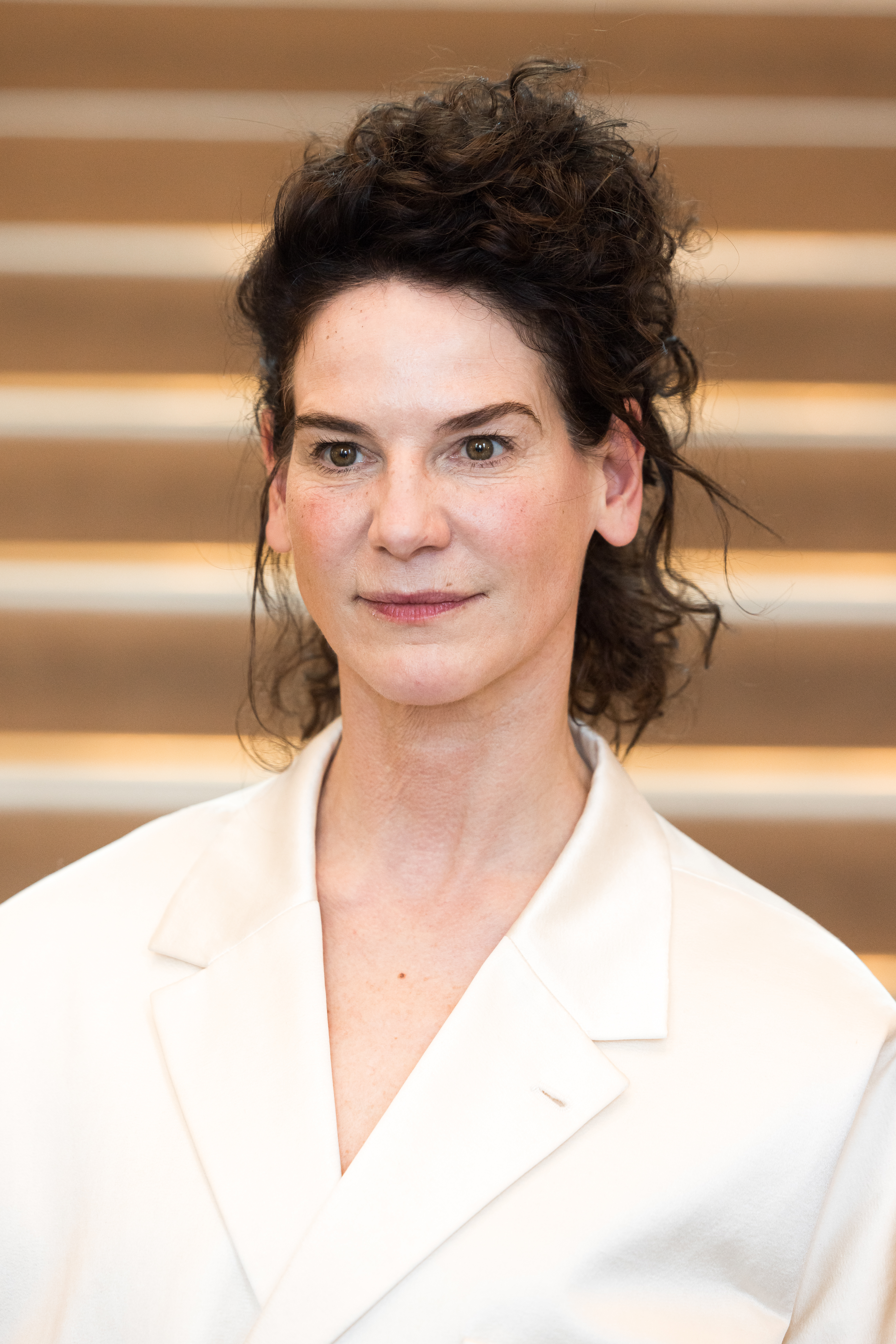
- Beglau in 2024
- Born: 16 July 1971 (age 55); Braunschweig, Lower Saxony, Germany
- Occupation: Actress
- Years active: 1995–present

Bibiana Beglau (born 16 July 1971) is a German actress.

== Life ==
Born in Braunschweig, Lower Saxony, Bibiana Beglau is the daughter of a border guard and a nurse. After training as an actor at the University of Music and Theatre in Hamburg, she worked with Einar Schleef, Christoph Schlingensief and Falk Richter, among others.

She became known for her leading role in Volker Schlöndorff's film The Legend of Rita, for which she was awarded the Silver Bear for Best Actress at the 2000 Berlin Film Festival and nominated for the European Film Prize. In 2000 she was awarded the Ulrich Wildgruber Prize. In 2004, Bibiana Beglau was again screened in The Ninth Day directed by Volker Schlöndorff, alongside Ulrich Matthes and August Diehl. For her acting performance, as a mother trying to hide a cruel secret Bibiana Beglau received the Adolf Grimme Prize in 2007 for Under the Ice together with director Aelrun Goette and cameraman Jens Harant.

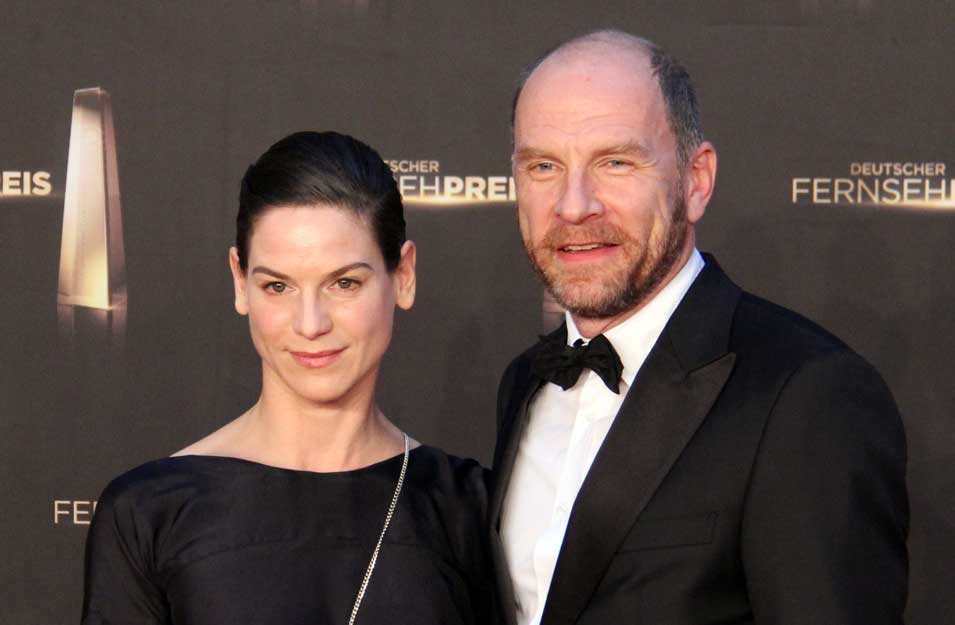
Bibiana Beglau at the awards for the Deutscher Fernsehpreis in 2012

Since 1996 she has repeatedly played leading roles in leading theatres in the German-speaking world. She has worked at the Burgtheater Vienna, the Schaubühne Berlin, the Schauspielhaus Zurich, the Düsseldorfer Schauspielhaus, the Thalia Theater Hamburg and the Volksbühne Berlin. The performance of Nothing hurts at the Kampnagelfabrik was invited to the Berlin Theatertreffen in 2000. [2]

In 2005 she played the role of Kunigunde in Martin Kušej's production of König Ottokars Glück und Ende at the Burgtheater, which was invited to the Salzburg Festival, and in 2008 she played Lady Macbeth in Sebastian Nübling's Shakespeare production at the Schauspielhaus Zurich.

She was a member of the ensemble at the Thalia Theater in Hamburg from 2009 to 2011. There she played the role of Rose Kennedy in Luk Perceval's "The truth about the Kennedys" and in Dimiter Gotscheff's productions Antigone and Oedipus, Tyrant in the three roles of "Kreon", "Teiresias" as well "the Messenger". Under Dimiter Gotscheffs she also took part in the world premiere of Peter Handke's play "Immer noch Sturm" at the Salzburg Festival. Until 2012, she could be seen at the Schaubühne and the Volksbühne Berlin, among others in 4.48 Psychose by Sarah Kane or Berlin Alexanderplatz by Alfred Döblin. In both plays she played one of the female leading roles for over 10 years.

From 2011 to 2019 she was a member of the ensemble at the Munich Residenztheater, where she also played three roles as Erna, Rosa and Schürzinger in Frank Castorf's production of Kasimir und Karoline von Ödön von Horváth. In 2012 she won the Kurt Meisel Prize for her portrayal of Petra von Kant in Die bitteren Tränen der Petra von Kant by Rainer Werner Fassbinder at the Munich Residenztheater under the direction of Martin Kušej. Since the 2019/20 season Bibiana Beglau has been a member of the ensemble of the Burgtheater Vienna, whose director is Martin Kušej.

Bibiana Beglau is also active as an audio book narrator. She has worked with Falk Richter's Gott ist ein DJ and has repeatedly lent her voice to audio book productions about Annemarie Schwarzenbach.

== Filmography (selection) ==
- 1995: Der Mörder und sein Kind (Director: Matti Geschonneck)
- 1996: 2½ Minuten (Director: Rolf Schübel)
- 1996: Absprung (Director: Hanno Brühl)
- 1997: Gegen den Strom (Director: Thorsten Näter)
- 1999: No Sex (Director: Josh Broecker)
- 1999: The Legend of Rita (Director: Volker Schlöndorff)
- 2000: Der Briefbomber (Director: Torsten C. Fischer)
- 2001: Birthday (Director: Stefan Jäger)
- 2001: Liebesschuld (Director: Ulrich Stark)
- 2002: Hamlet - This is your family (Director: Peter Kern)
- 2002: Nachtangst (Director: Michael Rowitz)
- 2002: Ten Minutes Older (Director: Volker Schlöndorff)
- 2003: Belmondo (Director: Annette Carle)
- 2003: Tatort: Gefährliches Schweigen (Director: Martin Eigler)
- 2003: The Ninth Day (Director: Volker Schlöndorff)
- 2003: Off Beat (Director: Hendrik Hoelzemann)
- 2004: Tatort: Sechs zum Essen (Director: Fillipos Tsitos)
- 2004: Three Degrees Colder (Director: Florian Hoffmeister)
- 2005: Ricordare Anna (Director: Walter Deuber)
- 2005: Under the Ice (Director: Aelrun Goette)
- 2005: Der große Schlaf (Director: Mona Lenz)
- 2006: Das Leuchten (Director: Krystof Zlatnik)
- 2007: Boxing Jesus (Director: Stefan Jäger)
- 2009: What You Don't See (Director: Wolfgang Fischer)
- 2010: Greed (Director: Dieter Wedel)
- 2010: Machtergreifung (Director: Bernd Fischauer)
- 2010: Tatort: Königskinder (Director: Thorsten Näter)
- 2010: The Last Employee (Director: Alexander Adolph)
- 2010: Tatort: Leben gegen Leben (Director: Nils Willbrandt)
- 2010: Stubbe – Von Fall zu Fall: Verräter (Director: Peter Kahane)
- 2011: Der kurze Ruhm des Alexander K. (Director: Manuel Fluryn Hendry)
- 2011: Die Konterrevolution (Director: Bernd Fischerauer)
- 2012: Die Machtergreifung (Director: Bernd Fischerauer)
- 2012: The Old Fox (Episode: Es ist niemals vorbei; Director: Hartmut Griesmayr)
- 2012: Europas letzter Sommer (Director: Bernd Fischerauer)
- 2012: Cologne P.D. (Episode: In tödlicher Beziehung; Director: Manuel Fluryn Hendry)
- 2012: Zappelphilipp (Director: Connie Walther)
- 2013: Helmut Schmidt - Lebensfragen (Director: Ben von Grafenstein)
- 2014: Der Kriminalist – Tod im Paradies (Director: Christian Görlitz)
- 2014: Die Abrechnung (Director: Dror Zahavi)
- 2014: Tatort – Der sanfte Tod (Director: Alexander Adolph)
- 2014: Willkommen im Klub (Director: Andreas Schimmelbusch)
- 2015: Axel der Held (Director: Hendrik Hölzemann)
- 2015: Schuld nach Ferdinand von Schirach - Der Andere (Director: Maris Pfeiffer)
- 2015: Die Liebe unserer Eltern (Director: Thomas Szabo)
- 2015: Schmutziges Blut (Director: Friedemann Fromm)
- 2017: Different Kinds of Rain (Director: Isa Prahl)
- 2017: Luna (Director: Khaled Kaissar)

== Documentary film ==
- Abgeschminkt: Bibiana Beglau. Documentary about Bibiana Beglau, Germany 2006 (Script and Director: Johanna Schickentanz)

== Theater (selection) ==
- 1997: Ivanov by Anton Chekhov as Sascha at Schauspielhaus Düsseldorf (Director: Anna Badora)
- 1997: As you like it by William Shakespeare as Rosalinde at Schauspielhaus Düsseldorf (Director: Nikolai Sykosch)
- 1997 - 1998: Lulu by Frank Wedekind as Lulu at Schauspielhaus Düsseldorf (Director: Anna Badora)
- 1997 - 1998: Salomé by Oscar Wilde as Herodias at Schauspielhaus Düsseldorf (Director: Einar Schleef)
- 1998 - 2003: Disco Pigs by Enda Walsh as Pig at Hamburger Schauspielhaus, Deutschen Theater Berlin and Schaubühne Berlin (Director: Thomas Ostermeier)
- 1999 - 2001: Nothing Hurts by Anouk van Dijk and Falk Richter at Kampnagel, Hamburg (Directors: Anouk van Dijk and Falk Richter)
- 2000 - 2010: Berlin Alexanderplatz by Alfred Döblin as Mietze at Volksbühne Berlin (Director: Frank Castorf)
- 2000 - 2001: Polaroids by Mark Ravenhills at Schauspielhaus Zürich (Director: Falk Richter)
- 2001 - 2012: 4.48 Psychosis by Sarah Kane at Schaubühne Berlin (Director: Falk Richter)
- 2001 - 2002: Hamlet by William Shakespeare as Ophelia at Schauspielhaus Zürich (Director: Christoph Schlingensief)
- 2002: Synchron by Thomas Hürlimann as Sibylle at Schauspielhaus Zürich (Director: Christoph Marthaler)
- 2003: Mourning Becomes Electra by Eugene O’Neill as Lavinia at Schauspielhaus Zürich (Director: Frank Castorf)
- 2003 - 2004: 57 Minuten 38 Sekunden Ewigkeit - '57 Minutes and 38 Seconds of Eternity' as Verschollene by Bibiana Beglau and Stefan Jäger at Schauspielhaus Zürich (Director: Stefan Jäger)
- 2004: Attabambi-Pornoland by Christoph Schlingensief at Schauspielhaus Zürich (Director: Christoph Schlingensief)
- 2005 - 2006: Fatherless by Anton Chekhov as Anna Petrovna at Volksbühne Berlin (Director: Stefan Pucher)
- 2005 - 2007: Barebacklying by Simone Aughterlony at Gessnerallee, Zürich, Hebbel Theater, Berlin and Schauburg, Rotterdam (Director: Simone Aughterlony)
- 2005 - 2009: König Ottokars Glück und Ende - 'King Ottokar's Happiness and End by Franz Grillparzer as Queen Kunigunde at Burgtheater Wien and the Salzburger Festspielen (Director: Martin Kušej)
- 2006 - 2008: Ghosts by Henrik Ibsen as Mrs. Alving at Schaubühne Berlin (Director: Sebastian Nübling)
- 2007: The Ugly One by Marius von Mayenburg as Fanny at Schaubühne Berlin (Director: Benedict Andrews)
- 2007 - 2009: Three Sisters by Anton Chekhov as Mascha at Schaubühne Berlin (Director: Falk Richter)
- 2007 - 2010: Im Ausnahmezustand - 'In a State of Emergency' by Falk Richter as the Woman at Schaubühne Berlin (Director: Falk Richter)
- 2008: Macbeth by William Shakespeare as Lady Macbeth at Schauspielhaus Zürich (Director: Sebastian Nübling)
- 2008 - 2009: The Cherry Orchard by Anton Chekhov as Mrs Ranewskaja at Schaubühne Berlin (Director: Falk Richter)
- 2009 - 2011: Oedipus, Tyrant by Friedrich Hölderlin by Heiner Müller as Creon, Tiresias and the Servant at Thalia Theater (Hamburg) (Director: Dimiter Gotscheff)
- 2009 - 2011: The truth about the Kennedys by Luk Perceval as Rose Kennedy at Thalia Theater (Hamburg) (Director: Luk Perceval)
- 2010 - 2011: Twelfth Night by William Shakespeare as Olivia at Thalia Theater (Hamburg) (Director: Jan Bosse)
- 2011 - 2012: Antigone by Bertolt Brecht as Guard, Tiresias and the Courier at Thalia Theater (Hamburg) (Director: Dimiter Gotscheff)
- 2011: Eyjafjallajökull-Tam-Tam by Helmut Krausser at Residenztheater Munich (Director: Robert Lehniger)
- 2011 - : Immer noch Sturm by Peter Handke as Ursula, at the Salzburger Festspielen, at Burgtheater Wien and at Thalia Theater (Hamburg) (Director: Dimiter Gotscheff)
- 2011–2012: Casimir and Caroline by Ödön von Horváth as Erna, Rosa und Schürzinger at Residenztheater Munich (Director: Frank Castorf)
- 2012 – : The Bitter Tears of Petra von Kant by Rainer Werner Fassbinder as Petra von Kant at Residenztheater Munich (Director: Martin Kušej)
- 2013: Der Komet after Jean Paul as 1 at Residenztheater Munich (Director: Katrin Plötner)
- 2013 – : Cement by Heiner Müller as Dascha Tschumalowa at Residenztheater Munich (Director: Dimiter Gotscheff)
- 2013 –: Journey to the End of the Night by Louis-Ferdinand Céline as Ferdinand Bardamu at Residenztheater Munich (Director: Frank Castorf)
- 2014–: Faust by Johann Wolfgang von Goethe as Mephisto at Residenztheater Munich (Director: Martin Kušej)
- 2014–: Who is afraid Virginia Woolf? by Edward Albee as Martha at Residenztheater Munich (Director: Martin Kušej)
- 2015–: Baal by Bertolt Brecht as Isabelle, the Wife from Hell at Residenztheater Munich (Director: Frank Castorf)

== Radio play (selection) ==
- 57 Minuten 38 Sekunden Ewigkeit’ - ‘57 Minutes and 38 Seconds of Eternity’ (Production: Theaterhörbuch Verlag)
- Der Verschollene - 'The Missing' by Franz Kafka (Produktion: SWR 2)
- Gott ist ein DJ - ‘God is a DJ by Falk Richter’ (Production: Theaterhörbuch Verlag)
- Liebeserklärungen einer Reisenden - ‘Love declarations of a traveler’ by Annemarie Schwarzenbach (Production: Kein und Aber Records)
- Wie ein Stein im Geröll - ‘Like a stone in the debris’ by Maria Barbal (Production: DAV)
- Wuthering Heights by Emily Brontë music by Anne Clark (Production: Der Hörverlag)
- 'Ulysses' by James Joyce (Production: Südwestrundfunk, Deutschlandfunk)
- 2011: 'Sklavenmarkt Deutschland'by Tom Schimmeck/Thilo Guschas; Director: Ulrich Lampen (NDR/ARD radiofeature)
- 2013: 'Ich Wir Ihr Sie' by Inga Helfrich; Director: Inga Helfrich (Production: BR)
- 2014: 'Die Quellen sprechen' Director: Ulrich Gerhardt (Production: Der Hörverlag)
- 2014: 'Die Schuld einer Mutter' by Paula Daly (Production: Der Hörverlag)
- 2015: 'Die Erfindung der Flügel' by Sue Monk Kidd (Production: Der Hörverlag)
- 2015: 'Kein Ort Nirgends' by Christa Wolf (Production: Der Audio Verlag GmbH)

== Awards (selection) ==
- 2000: Berlinale Silver Bear for dramatic performance in The Legend of Rita
- 2000: Riga Filmfestival Award for dramatic performance in The Legend of Rita
- 2000: European Actress of the Year (nomination) for dramatic performance in The Legend of Rita
- 2000: Ulrich Wildgruber Award for dramatic performance in The Legend of Rita
- 2007: Adolf-Grimme-Award for dramatic performance in Under the Ice
- 2008: Audience Award for outstanding performances at Zurich Schauspielhaus in Macbeth
- 2012: Kurt-Meisel-Award for outstanding performances in The Bitter Tears of Petra von Kant and Kasimir and Karoline
- 2014: Theater Heute Prize Actress of the Year for Faust, Journey to the End of the Night and Cement
