= Ghiglione =

Ghiglione is an Italian surname. Notable people with the surname include:

- Loren Ghiglione (born 1941), American journalist, editor, and educator
- Paolo Ghiglione (born 1997), Italian footballer
- Romualdo Ghiglione (1891–1940), Italian gymnast
