= The Legend of Rita =

- German DVD cover
- Directed by: Volker Schlöndorff
- Written by: Wolfgang Kohlhaase; Volker Schlöndorff
- Produced by: Arthur Hofer; Emmo Lempert; Friedrich-Carl Wachs
- Starring: Bibiana Beglau; Nadja Uhl; Martin Wuttke; Harald Schrott; Mario Irrek; Alexander Beyer; Jenny Schily
- Cinematography: Andreas Höfer
- Edited by: Peter Przygodda
- Release date: 2000
- Running time: 95 minutes
- Country: Germany
- Language: German

Die Stille nach dem Schuss (literally The Silence after the Shot) is a 2000 German film that was released in English as The Legend of Rita (also sometimes referred to as Legends of Rita, The Legends of Rita, or Rita's Legends). The film focuses on collusion between the East German secret police, or Stasi, and the West German terrorist group Red Army Faction (RAF). The fictional characters all have close parallels to real-life RAF members. The script was reportedly based on events in the life of Inge Viett.

== Plot ==
In a letter left for her friend Tatjana, fugitive Red Army Faction (RAF) terrorist Rita Vogt (Bibiana Beglau) relates the story of her life.

During the 1970s, Rita and her fellow urban guerrillas carried out armed robberies, kidnappings, and various other attacks in West Germany, as part of their campaign of armed struggle against the capitalist system. During a visit to Paris, Rita is asked by a local police officer for her license. In response, she flees, the French police officer pursues her into a parking ramp, and Rita fatally shoots him.

Later, following a prison break which involves the murder of a West Berlin corrections officer, Rita and her comrades flee via the Friedrichstraße train station into East Berlin. As the German Democratic Republic (GDR) has signed conventions against terrorism, the communist East German government is reluctant to help. The chief of the Stasi, Erich Mielke (Dietrich Körner), disagrees. In a conversation with Stasi officer Erwin Hull (Martin Wuttke), Mielke expresses sympathy for the RAF's terrorist attacks against West German and U.S. targets, which he compares to his own similar activities during both the Weimar Republic and the Nazi regime. He orders Agent Hull to assist them unofficially.

Hull arranges a safe house for the fugitives and secretly trains them in the use of military hardware. As Rita watches her comrades training in the use of Rocket-propelled grenades, she is visibly horrified.

Hull explains that those who wish to retire from armed struggle will be given new identities so that they can start a new life in the GDR. The group's two women, Friederike Adebach (Jenny Schily) and Rita, accept the offer, much to the shock and horror of the men.

Hull then prepares Rita for her new identity and coaches her on a fictitious "legend", or backstory, that becomes her new "truth". Once the "legend" is constructed and memorized, Rita is given a menial job at a Volkseigener Betrieb clothing factory. Explaining that she is a West German, who voluntarily emigrated across the Berlin Wall, Rita shocks her co-workers, who have never heard of such a thing.

To their further shock, Rita takes "solidarity" cash collections for the Sandinistas at face value and willingly donates large amounts of money. Disgusted, Rita's coworkers explain that the donations actually go to the East German government's coffers and that the claims about helping Nicaragua are just a confidence scam. Rita's patronizing response sickens her coworkers, who ostracize her.

Only her depressed and alcoholic co-worker Tatjana (Nadja Uhl) develops a friendship with her. They bond deeply, Rita helps Tatjana toward sobriety, and even begins a lesbian relationship with her. Then a television announcement about the RAF from West Germany stops Rita short during a birthday party. Not only has her former lover been killed during an RPG attack against a NATO base, but the West German media continues to broadcast her as a hunted fugitive. The next morning, a co-worker tells Rita that she recognizes her from the broadcast and vows to expose who she is. In response, the Stasi promptly relocates her, allowing her only a brief, painful goodbye to Tatjana.

Her next residence and workplace, "Legend Number 2", is a children's day care center. While on vacation on the Baltic Sea, she gets to know and falls in love with a student, Jochen Pettka (Alexander Beyer). Despite her cautiousness, it becomes ever more difficult for her to hide her past. After she becomes pregnant, Jochen asks her to marry him and to travel with him to an event in the Soviet Union. Agent Hull, however, tells her that this is impossible, as it will cause the Stasi's ties to the RAF to leak out. Explaining that the increasing unrest may soon topple the GDR, Hull urges Rita to have an abortion—implying that her child will be better off.

During a choral performance, Rita notices Friederike Adebach among the choir's participants. Now married with a child, Friederike is suffering under the Communist system, and bears it with grudging resentment — the same emotion seen on the faces of other GDR residents throughout the film. Rita and Friederike's reunion is sullen and they part unceremoniously.

Soon after, Rita reveals her past to Jochen. Deeply sickened, he breaks his ties to her.

In 1989, East Germany collapses. As Western consumer goods flood in, Rita is visibly disgusted and horrified. Ignoring her coworker's contempt for her opinion, Rita lectures them about how they "will never have it this good again."

Soon after, the Stasi is disbanded and its weapons are confiscated. Agent Hull informs Rita that he can no longer protect her. The news of her presence has gotten out and the GDR's Volkspolizei, or Vopos, will soon be coming to arrest her. In response, Rita expresses outrage that capitalism "has no borders". After watching news footage of Friederike's arrest and extradition to West Germany, Rita goes on the run.

Meanwhile, after years of imprisonment by Agent Hull merely for knowing about Rita's presence in the GDR, Tatjana is finally released and joyously runs to Rita's flat. Upon her arrival, she is grabbed by a group of plainclothes Vopos, who ask, "Are you Rita Vogt?"

Attempting to flee to Poland by motorbike, Rita is asked to show her ID at a Vopo checkpoint. In a deeply ironic moment, Rita accelerates, clearly expecting the East German policemen to chase after her like their predecessor in Paris. Instead, a Vopo raises an AK-47 and riddles Rita with bullets. As she falls dead from the motorbike, Rita's voice is heard in voiceover: "That's exactly how it was. More or less."

== Depiction ==
Notably, the film is shot with a decidedly 1970s-style color scheme, rather than with simply 1970s furniture and effects as most such movies do; this provides an interesting "throwback" visual experience for the viewer considering the movie was indeed made at the turn of the century. And although the movie mainly centers around the trials and tribulations of a leftist-activist woman known as Rita Vogt, many motifs in the script reflect Inge Viett's real life: she really did flee to East Germany along with some others in 1982, having fatally shot a Paris policeman in 1981, and she really did receive a new identity to live under in Dresden. Viett accused Schlöndorff and script-writer Wolfgang Kohlhaase of plagiarism, and the parties reached an "out of court" settlement.

Throughout, the GDR is shown as a drab, grey, and dull nation. Its citizens are depicted as bearing their fate with resignation which masks their deep hatred of the Communist system. Rita, however, is always smiling and joyful, in unnerving contrast to everyone around her. For Rita, the GDR is a romantic and happy utopia. This is in direct contrast to her angry expressions towards capitalism and visible excitement during the bank robberies at the beginning of the film. This is also why she displays such profound disappointment at the end of the film when the Berlin Wall is toppled. It never crosses her mind that no one else she has met has ever truly believed in the GDR.
