= Don Hollenbeck =

American journalist

- Born: March 30, 1905; Lincoln, Nebraska, U.S.
- Died: June 22, 1954 (aged 49); Manhattan, New York, U.S.
- Cause of death: Suicide
- Resting place: Wyuka Cemetery
- Education: University of Nebraska
- Occupation: Journalist
- Years active: 1926-1954
- Spouse(s): Jessie Seacrest; Mildred Raleigh; Angelique Murphy Dean
- Children: 2

Don Hollenbeck (March 30, 1905 – June 22, 1954) was a CBS newscaster, commentator, and associate of Edward R. Murrow and Fred W. Friendly. He was the writer and producer of CBS Views the Press, a Peabody Award-winning radio show that critiqued powerful print journalists. Hollenbeck was also a frequent critic of McCarthyism and was subject to a smear campaign for his supposed Communist leanings. He died by suicide in 1954 after a tumultuous personal and professional life.

== Career ==
Donald Hollenbeck was born and raised in Lincoln, Nebraska. In 1926, he left the University of Nebraska to take a job as a reporter at the Nebraska State Journal. Three years later, he moved to the Omaha Daily Bee. In 1937, he moved to New York and took the job of picture editor for the Associated Press. In 1940, when the newspaper PM was founded, he joined as picture editor and then became its national news editor. In 1941, he joined the United States Office of War Information. He was assigned to the foreign staff of NBC in London in March 1943. From there he went to Algiers just in time to take a place with the British troops landing at Salerno, Italy in September. He went in with the second wave—the assault wave which took the full force of German shells, and later made a number of battle-action recordings which were broadcast to the United States.

During the conquest of southern Italy, Hollenbeck moved northward with the troops and was one of the first correspondents to begin broadcasting from Naples when the Army Signal Corps set up transmitters for the correspondents. But at Salerno he was stricken with malaria, then with jaundice and ordered back home:

The first big event for me in covering the news over there was at Salerno, just south of the town. I'll never forget it! We were on a headquarters ship and had put the commanding officer ashore, then for a while feared we couldn't get the rest of the people off. We were under heavy fire, so had to back off and spend that morning shuttling back and forth in the bay with German aircraft overhead and German '88' guns on shore, and behind us our own destroyers and cruisers bombarding the shore positions, so it was not a very pleasant cruise we had around the gulf of Salerno... I had a wire recorder with me and was on top of the landing craft trying to make some records at the time.

Asked what kind of protection there was after these forces had landed, Hollenbeck replied:

You hope there is air cover. We had difficulty that way because our forces were based in Sicily. They had to fly all the way, and it didn't give them very much gas to spend over our heads. We looked for those planes most of the time.

From Stars and Stripes September 20, 1943:

Don Hollenbeck of NBC sent back from Italy one of the most dramatic recordings we've ever heard. Against a backdrop of gunfire Don gave a vivid description of the bitter battle raging about him as he stood on the shore with microphone in hand and a portable recorder on his back. Interviews with the boys engaged in the fight were outstanding.
A wire recorder was used for this broadcast from the beach at Salerno. On the hair-fine thread of steel wound on that small spool every sound of battle was inscribed, then relayed to Algiers and short-waved to the United States on September 17. In such fashion history is chronicled today with complete fidelity even while in the making, and that in itself is history.

=== Allegations regarding communism ===
Hollenbeck was at one time employed by the newspaper PM. Founded in 1940 by department store magnate Marshall Field III and published in New York, PM was a left-leaning newspaper, and it garnered accusations of being sympathetic to Communism even though it was critical of the Soviet Union for the Molotov–Ribbentrop Pact and of the American Communist Party for supporting it.

The newspaper published work by authors such as Ernest Hemingway and Erskine Caldwell, photographers such as Weegee and Margaret Bourke-White, and cartoonists such as Dr. Seuss, Crockett Johnson and Walt Kelly. It accepted no advertising, and dedicated itself to preventing "the little guy from being pushed around." It ended up becoming a target for anti-communists, and went out of business in 1948. Because of this affiliation, Hollenbeck was a target for columnist Jack O'Brian, a Joseph McCarthy supporter whose attacks appeared in the New York Journal-American and other newspapers in the Hearst chain.

Hollenbeck also worked for the Office of War Information (OWI), NBC and ABC, once subbing on short notice for Orson Welles over Welles' scheduled Sunday ABC news commentary program, before joining CBS in 1946. The move to CBS followed his firing by ABC's New York flagship radio station WJZ; after listening repeatedly over a six-month period to a musical commercial for Marlin razors that immediately preceded his 7 a.m. newscast, Hollenbeck told his listeners: "The atrocity you have just heard is no part of this show."

Murrow had Hollenbeck work on the innovative media-review program, CBS Views the Press, over the radio network's flagship station, WCBS. Hollenbeck discussed Edward U. Condon, Alger Hiss, and Paul Robeson.

- Regarding Condon, Hollenbeck critiqued anti-communists for going about their business the wrong way:
  Communists want nothing more than to be lumped with freedom-loving non-Communists ... This simply makes it easier for them to conceal their true nature, and to allege that the term 'Communist' is meaningless ... At the same time, we cannot let abuses deter us from the legitimate exposing of real Communists.
  (Here, Hollenbeck was placing Condon in the "freedom-loving non-Communist" camp.)
- Regarding Hiss (during which case, as Loren Ghiglione has noted "Hollenbeck and his coverage of the reporting of the Hiss–Chambers case did not take sides on Hiss's guilt or innocence"), Hollenbeck criticized press coverage. For instance, he noted how a New York Journal-American story led a story stating "The government ended its cross-examination of Alger Hiss at 3:01 p.m. today after forcing him to admit he was an associate of Mrs. Carol King, prominent legal defender of Communists, and a friend of Nathan Witt, ex-New Deal lawyer who was fired because of his Communist activities." Hollenbeck noted that the transcript differed greatly, in that Hiss had said: he had met King "once or twice", while his description of when and where he met Witt even less clear. He also noted the guilt by association tactics of fellow journalists, for example, Westbrook Pegler, who sought to discredit Eleanor Roosevelt through link to Hiss via Felix Frankfurter.
- Regarding Robeson and the Peekskill riots of 27 August 1949, Hollenbeck said that, while most newspapers had covered the riots well, the New York World-Telegram had drawn from sources that disliked Robeson, including The Daily Compass (successor to PM, Hollenbeck's former employer).

In the early 1950s, Hollenbeck worked both for CBS Television and flagship WCBS-TV.

The first newsman WCBS-TV viewers saw after Murrow's March 9, 1954, documentary on Joe McCarthy was Hollenbeck, who told the viewers he wanted "to associate myself with what Ed Murrow has just said, and say I have never been prouder of CBS." That prompted O'Brian in the Hearst newspapers (including the flagship Journal-American) to step up his criticism of CBS and especially of Hollenbeck, who, despite his news experience under pressure situations, was a sensitive man.

== Personal life and death ==
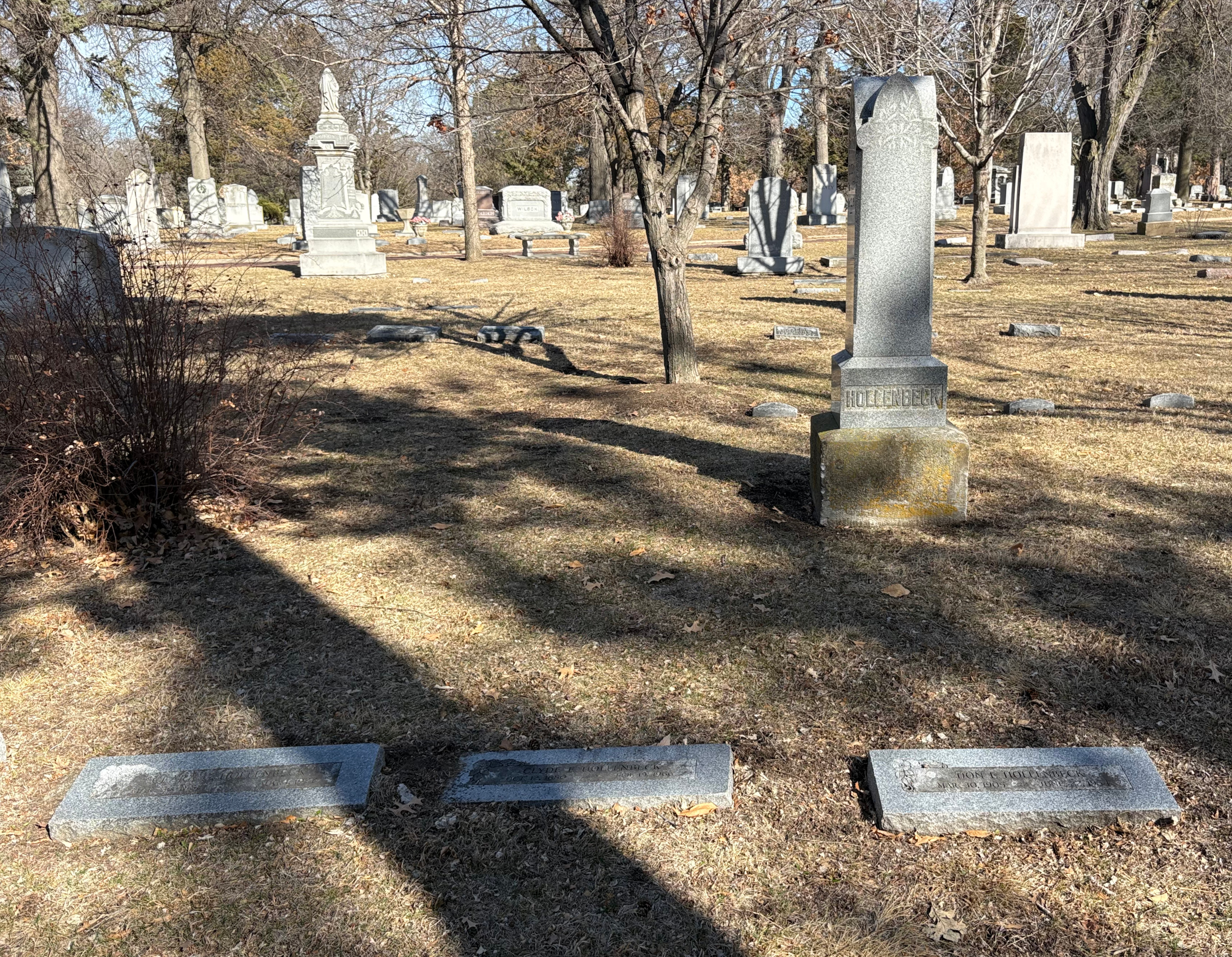
Hollenbeck's grave at Wyuka Cemetery

Hollenbeck was married three times. First to Jessie Seacrest (1926-1928, one child). Second to Mildred Raleigh (1934-1940). Lastly to Angelique 'Anne' Murphy Dean (1941-1952, one child).

By 1954, Hollenbeck had developed stomach ulcers that were so severe that the pain was interfering with his work and he was repeatedly hospitalized. On June 22, 1954, the 49-year-old Hollenbeck died from suicide by gas in his Manhattan apartment. He was buried at Wyuka Cemetery in Lincoln. In his 2008 biography, CBS's Don Hollenbeck: An Honest Reporter in the Age of McCarthyism, journalist Loren Ghiglione suggests that other reasons for his suicide may have included depression, and the frequent published attacks by Jack O'Brian.

== Legacy ==
Ray Wise as Don Hollenbeck in Good Night, and Good Luck

In the 1976 film Network, after being fired as president of the news division of the fictional UBS network, Max Schumacher (William Holden) is packing his belongings and finds an old picture taken when he and Howard Beale (Peter Finch) worked at CBS and notes that Hollenbeck is in the picture.

In 1986, Hollenbeck was played by Harry Ditson in the HBO original production Murrow.

In 2005, Hollenbeck was played by Ray Wise in the film Good Night, and Good Luck, which was centered on Murrow and CBS News in their 1950s campaign against McCarthy. One of the film's sub-plots included Hollenbeck's suicide following continued printed attacks by Jack O'Brian. He was portrayed through the film as a broken man, as a result of his wife leaving him and the allegations by O'Brian that he was a "pinko" communist-sympathizer who deliberately biased his news reports. The movie shows Hollenbeck's suicide closely following Murrow's April rebuttal to McCarthy, but the two events were in reality separated by two months; in the film's commentary track on the DVD release, director George Clooney said that this was done for dramatic reasons.

In 2024, it was announced George Clooney would make his Broadway debut starring in a stage adaptation of the film Good Night, and Good Luck. The play began previews at the Winter Garden Theatre on March 12, 2025, opened on April 3 and closed on June 8. Actor Clark Gregg played Don Hollenbeck in the Broadway adaptation of Good Night, and Good Luck.
