= Jenny Schily =

German actress

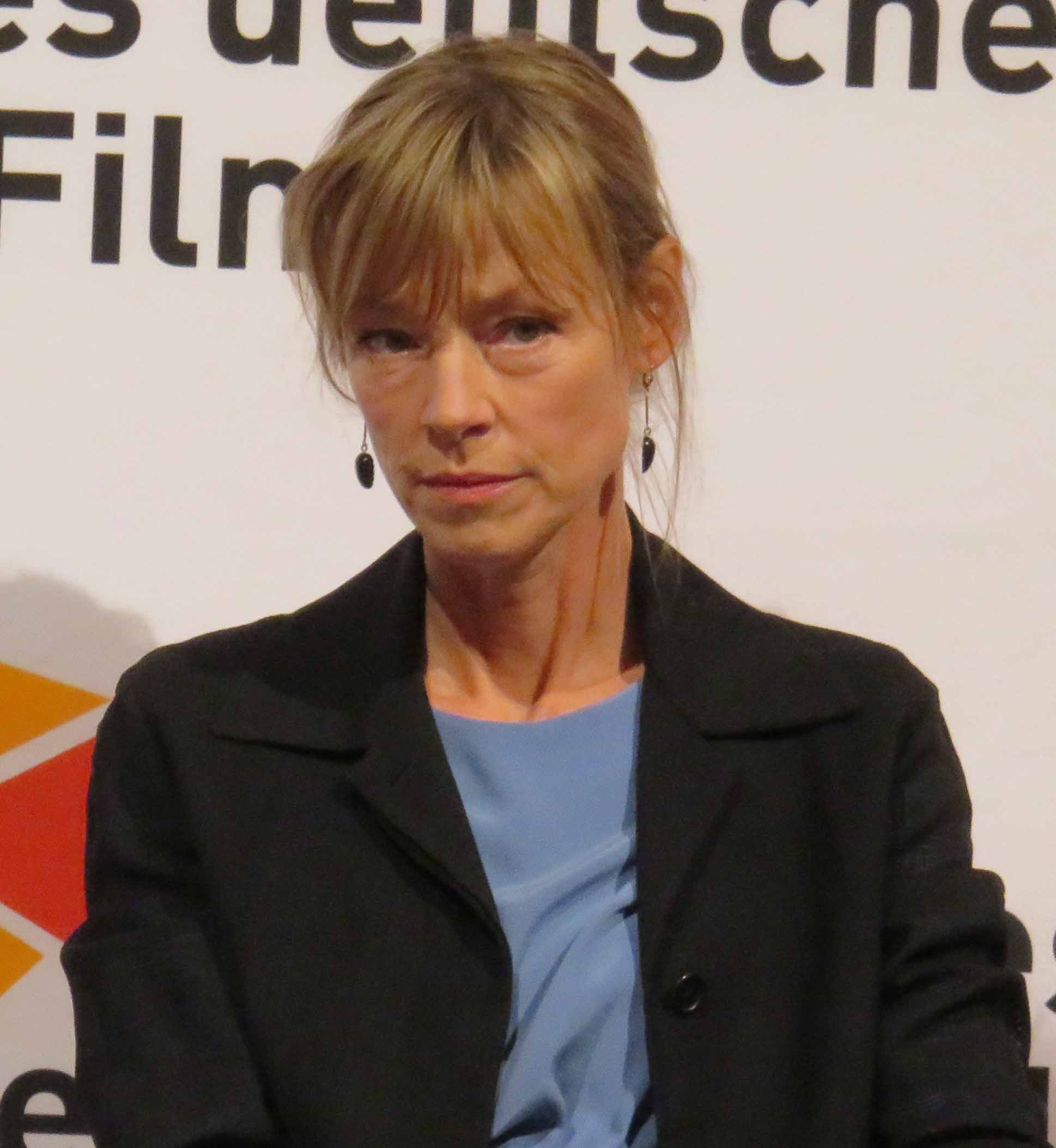
- Schily in 2016
- Born: 14 May 1967 (age 58); West Berlin, West Germany
- Occupation: Actress
- Children: 1

Jenny Rosa Schily (born 14 May 1967) is a German actress who primarily works in theater and film. She has also performed in radio plays.

== Life ==
Schily was born in West Berlin, the daughter of lawyer and politician Otto Schily and his first wife, painter Christine Schily née Hellwag. Her two given names were in given in reference to Jenny Marx and Rosa Luxemburg respectively. She is also the great-granddaughter of architect Bruno Taut. After studying Slavic studies, which was broken off after two semesters, she studied acting at the Ernst Busch Academy of Dramatic Arts in Berlin from 1991 to 1995. Her first appearance on stage was at Staatsschauspiel Dresden, where she debuted as the title character in Emilia Galotti. Then she went to Schauspiel Frankfurt and became a member of the ensemble at Theater am Turm. She performed at the Schaubühne in Berlin from 2002 to 2006 and at the Maxim Gorki Theater from 2010 to 2011.

Schily landed her first major role in 1996 in the television film You Are Not Alone: The Roy Black Story, which is based on the life singer Roy Black, portraying his wife Silke. Another important film was The Legend of Rita, directed by Volker Schlöndorff.

Schily has one daughter and resides in Berlin.
