= Orson Welles Commentaries =

1945 ABC radio series on literature

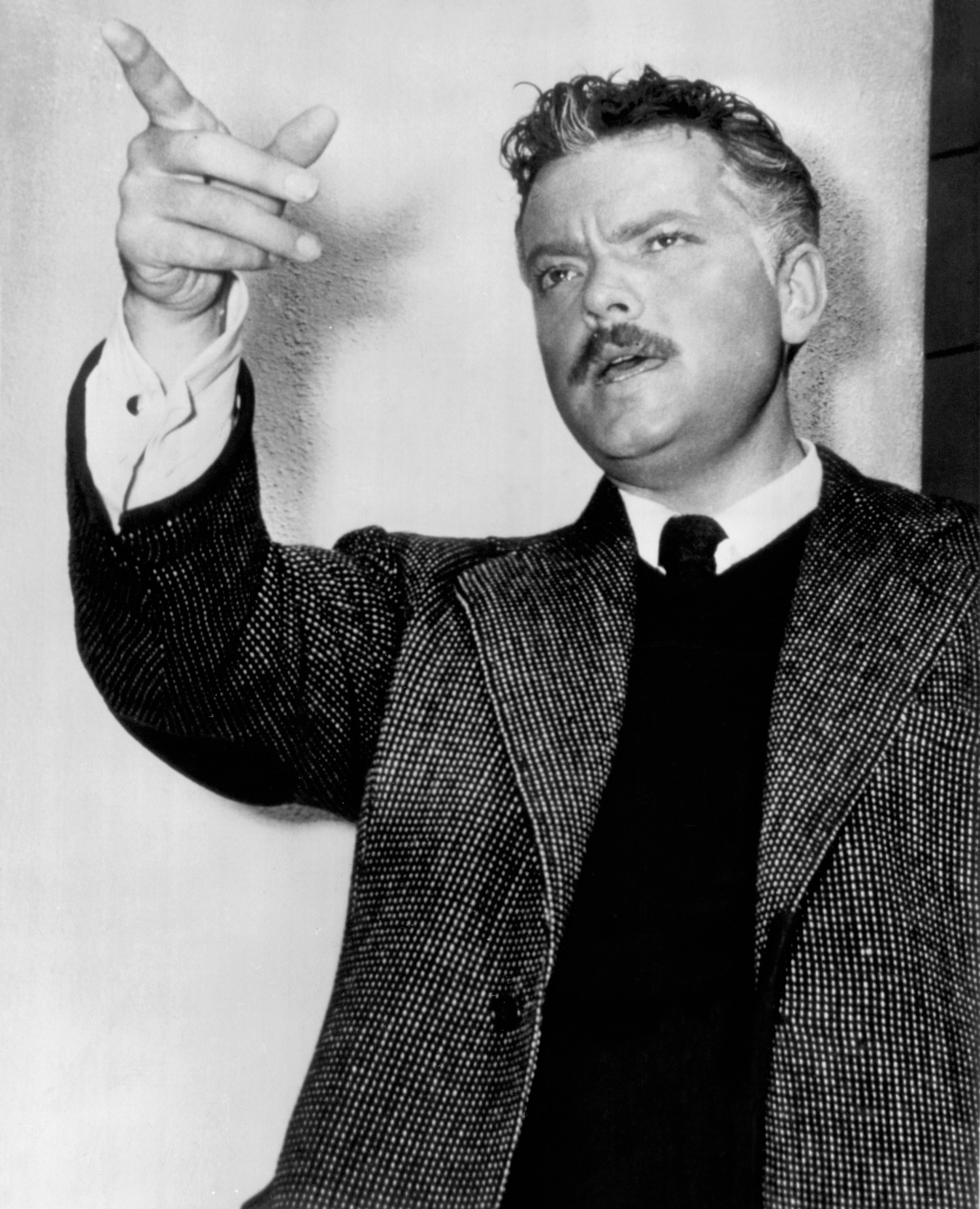
- Orson Welles (October 29, 1945)
- Genre: Social commentary, political commentary, reminiscences and readings
- Running time: 15 minutes
- Country of origin: United States
- Language(s): English
- Home station: ABC
- Hosted by: Orson Welles
- Written by: Orson Welles
- Directed by: Orson Welles
- Produced by: Orson Welles
- Original release: September 16, 1945 – October 6, 1946
- No. of series: 1
- No. of episodes: 56

Orson Welles Commentaries (1945–46) is an ABC radio series produced and directed by Orson Welles. Featuring commentary by Welles, with reminiscences and readings from literature, the 15-minute weekly program aired Sunday afternoons at 1:15 p.m. ET beginning September 16, 1945. Lear Radio sponsored the program through the end of June 1946 when it failed to find a larger audience. The series was continued by ABC as a sustaining show through October 6, 1946. Orson Welles Commentaries was the last of Welles's own radio shows.

== Episodes ==
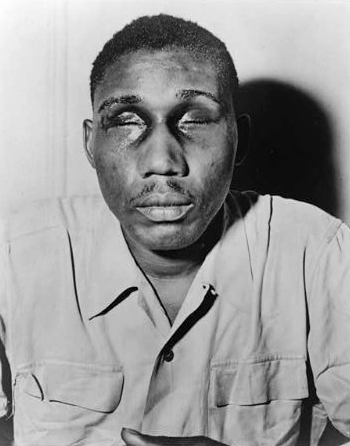
Welles's five broadcasts on the beating and blinding of decorated U.S. Army veteran Isaac Woodard in South Carolina (July 28 – August 25, 1946) brought significant national attention to the case.

| # | Date | Program | Recording | References |
|---|---|---|---|---|
| 1 | September 16, 1945 | Welles begins his weekly series of social and political commentary and readings, and discusses matador Fernando López. | | |
| 2 | September 23, 1945 | Welles tells The Story of Bonito, the Bull by Robert J. Flaherty, the only part of the unfinished omnibus film It's All True he ever presented to an audience. Welles later told the story of Bonito in the final episode of his 1955 BBC-TV series, Orson Welles' Sketch Book. | | |
| 3 | September 30, 1945 | Cast: Orson Welles | | |
| 4 | October 7, 1945 | Cast: Orson Welles | | |
| 5 | October 14, 1945 | Cast: Orson Welles | | |
| 6 | October 21, 1945 | Cast: Orson Welles | | |
| 7 | October 28, 1945 | Cast: Orson Welles | | |
| 8 | November 4, 1945 | Welles discusses the ousting of Brazilian president Getúlio Vargas. | | |
| 9 | November 11, 1945 | Welles reads a letter from Louis Armstrong in which he recounts his early days, while Barney Bigard, Zutty Singleton, Fred Washington and others play "Perdido Street Blues". | | |
| 10 | November 18, 1945 | Cast: Orson Welles | | |
| 11 | November 25, 1945 | Cast: Orson Welles | | |
| 12 | December 2, 1945 | Cast: Orson Welles | | |
| 13 | December 9, 1945 | A broadcast from the U. S. Naval Training and Distribution Center, Treasure Island, San Francisco, California, via KGO, featuring Commodore Robert W. Cary, USN, commander of the center. The three theatre complexes are named to honor three World War II heroes killed in action: John Basilone (Theatre Three), Edward O'Hare (Theatre Two) and Doris Miller (Theatre One), the first African American to be awarded the Navy Cross. Includes a conversation on race prejudice with Miller's father, Connery Miller, via WACO in Waco, Texas. | | |
| 14 | December 16, 1945 | Cast: Orson Welles | | |
| 15 | December 23, 1945 | Cast: Orson Welles | | |
| 16 | December 30, 1945 | Cast: Orson Welles | | |
| 17 | January 6, 1946 | Cast: Orson Welles | | |
| 18 | January 13, 1946 | Cast: Orson Welles | | |
| 19 | January 20, 1946 | Cast: Orson Welles | | |
| 20 | January 27, 1946 | Cast: Orson Welles | | |
| 21 | February 3, 1946 | Cast: Orson Welles | | |
| 22 | February 10, 1946 | Cast: Orson Welles | | |
| 23 | February 17, 1946 | Cast: Orson Welles | | |
| 24 | February 24, 1946 | Cast: Orson Welles | | |
| 25 | March 3, 1946 | Cast: Orson Welles | | |
| 26 | March 10, 1946 | Cast: Orson Welles | | |
| 27 | March 17, 1946 | Cast: Orson Welles | | |
| 28 | March 24, 1946 | Cast: Orson Welles | | |
| 29 | March 31, 1946 | Cast: Orson Welles | | |
| 30 | April 7, 1946 | Cast: Orson Welles | | |
| 31 | April 14, 1946 | Cast: Orson Welles | | |
| 32 | April 21, 1946 | Cast: Orson Welles | | |
| 33 | April 28, 1946 | Cast: Orson Welles | | |
| 34 | May 5, 1946 | Cast: Orson Welles | | |
| 35 | May 12, 1946 | Due to illness, Welles is replaced by George Hays. | | |
| 36 | May 19, 1946 | Cast: Orson Welles | | |
| 37 | May 26, 1946 | Cast: Orson Welles | | |
| 38 | June 2, 1946 | Cast: Orson Welles | | |
| 39 | June 9, 1946 | Cast: Orson Welles | | |
| 40 | June 16, 1946 | Cast: Orson Welles | | |
| 41 | June 23, 1946 | Welles calls for protest on the end of the Office of Price Administration. | | |
| 42 | June 30, 1946 | Welles protests the end of OPA price controls and the imminent atomic test at Bikini Atoll—with his wife Rita Hayworth's image on the A-bomb, nicknamed "Gilda". | | |
| 43 | July 7, 1946 | Lear Radios does not renew its sponsorship option due to low audience numbers, but ABC continues the program. Welles's pay is cut from $1,700 to $50 per show. | | |
| 44 | July 14, 1946 | Cast: Orson Welles | | |
| 45 | July 21, 1946 | Don Hollenbeck substitutes for Welles, who is ill. Topics include compromise on OPA rent and price controls, and unrest in Bolivia. | | |
| 46 | July 28, 1946 | First episode about the Isaac Woodard case. Welles reads an affidavit sent to him by the NAACP signed by Isaac Woodard, a black veteran who was beaten and blinded by South Carolina police hours after he had been honorably discharged from the U.S. Army. Welles promises to root out the officer responsible and makes the case a major focus of his weekly show. Bret Wood: "Welles took up the cause, having always been outspoken on issues of racism and turned the event into a scathing attack on postwar racism and ingratitude". | | |
| 47 | August 4, 1946 | Second program related to the Woodard case. Welles remarks on world peace negotiations and Congress. | | |
| 48 | August 11, 1946 | Third program related to the Woodard case. Welles reads from his July 1944 editorial, "Race Hate Must Be Outlawed". | | |
| 49 | August 18, 1946 | Fourth program related to the Woodard case. Welles reads and responds to a letter from a white supremacist, and reads from his December 1943 editorial, "The Unknown Soldier". | | |
| 50 | August 25, 1946 | Fifth and last program related to the Woodard case. Museum of Broadcasting: "The NAACP felt that these broadcasts did more than anything else to prompt the Justice Department to act on the case". | | |
| 51 | September 1, 1946 | Welles is told in September that ABC is unable to continue his sustained program after the October 6 show. | | |
| 52 | September 8, 1946 | Cast: Orson Welles | | |
| 53 | September 15, 1946 | Cast: Orson Welles | | |
| 54 | September 22, 1946 | Cast: Orson Welles | | |
| 55 | September 29, 1946 | Cast: Orson Welles | | |
| 56 | October 6, 1946 | Last show of the series, and the last of Welles's own radio shows | | |
