= Ricordare Anna =

- Swiss DVD cover starring Bibiana Beglau and Mathias Gnädinger
- Directed by: Walter Deuber
- Written by: Walter Deuber; Josy Meier
- Starring: Bibiana Beglau; Mathias Gnädinger
- Cinematography: Stefan Runge; Knut Schmitz
- Edited by: Caterina Mona
- Music by: Peter Rebeiz; Pippo Pollina
- Production companies: Dschoint Ventschr Filmproduktion AG; SRF Schweizer Radio und Fernsehen; RSI Radiotelevisione svizzera
- Distributed by: Frenetic Films Distribution
- Release date: January 2005
- Running time: 96 minutes
- Country: Switzerland
- Languages: Italian; Swiss German; German

Ricordare Anna is a 2005 Swiss drama film directed by Walter Deuber and written by Deuber and Josy Meier. Starring Mathias Gnädinger and Bibiana Beglau, it follows a father who travels to Sicily in search of his dead daughter’s past. The film premiered in January 2005, and Gnädinger was nominated for Best Performance in a Leading Role at the 2005 Swiss Film Award.

== Synopsis ==
Following a heart attack, a father travels to Sicily in search of his daughter, who had lived there with her Italian husband before dying of AIDS. Confronted with the past, he gradually moves toward forgiving the son-in-law he had long held responsible.

== Cast ==
The cast includes:

- Mathias Gnädinger as Viktor Looser
- Bibiana Beglau as Anna Looser
- Pippo Pollina as Salvo Marotta
- Margareta von Krauss as Olga Marotta
- Suly Röthlisberger as Beth Looser

== Production ==
Walter Deuber first developed the project under the title Die Schlange hat nicht gelogen, drawing on the story of a family affected by AIDS. As the film evolved, he reshaped the material into a fictional narrative with Josy Meier as co-writer. The production made use of Sicilian locations linked to the story behind the film, and was shot on a minimal budget in Swiss German and Italian after no German or Italian co-producer was secured.

== Reception ==
=== Awards and nominations ===
At the 2005 Swiss Film Award, Mathias Gnädinger was nominated for Best Performance in a Leading Role.

=== Critical response ===
Cineman wrote that the film pushes its sense of interconnectedness and its reconciliatory ending too far, but described it as a moving film with a first-rate supporting cast. Filmdienst described the film as a tightly woven dreamlike drama that moves across several narrative and symbolic levels. Filmbulletin described the film as a brilliantly acted and superbly directed Swiss film.

== Festival screenings ==
In 2005, the film was screened at the Solothurn Film Festival and the 58th Locarno Film Festival. In 2006, it was screened at the 19th Festival International de Programmes Audiovisuels, the European Film Market, and the ZoomIgualada European TV Movies Festival.
