= Orson Welles' Sketch Book =

- Genre: Commentary
- Written by: Orson Welles
- Starring: Orson Welles
- Country of origin: United Kingdom
- Original language: English
- No. of seasons: 1
- No. of episodes: 6

Production
- Producer: Huw Wheldon
- Running time: 15 minutes
- Production company: BBC-TV Drama Department

Original release
- Network: BBC
- Release: 24 April – 28 May 1955

Related
- Around the World with Orson Welles

Orson Welles' Sketch Book is a series of six short television commentaries by Orson Welles for the BBC in 1955. Written and presented by Welles, the 15-minute episodes present the filmmaker's commentaries on a range of subjects. Welles frequently draws from his own experiences and often illustrates the episodes with his own sketches.

== Episodes ==
- "The Early Days" – Welles discusses a timely earthquake, first-night audiences at the Gate Theatre in Dublin, and how he came to be an actor. (First broadcast 24 April 1955.)
- "Critics" – Welles talks about a Boston performance of Five Kings, the consequences of Percy Hammond's negative review of the Voodoo Macbeth, and a curse placed on the film It's All True. (First broadcast 8 May 1955.)
- "The Police" – Welles relates the story of Isaac Woodard, a decorated black World War II veteran who was blinded in a brutal 1946 beating by South Carolina police. Welles first told the story in July 1946 on his radio show, Orson Welles Commentaries (ABC), and made the case a focus of his weekly broadcasts throughout September 1946. Welles's comments on his BBC-TV series foreshadow a speech made in Touch of Evil (1958): "I'm willing to admit that the policeman has a difficult job, a very hard job. But it's the essence of our society that a policeman's job should be hard. He's there to protect the free citizen, not to chase criminals – that's an incidental part of the job." (First broadcast 22 May 1955.)
- "People I Miss" – Prompts used by actors and others; remembering Harry Houdini; observations on gender differences in the appreciation of magic tricks; John Barrymore. (First broadcast 5 June 1955.)
- "The War of the Worlds" – The famous 1938 Mercury Theatre broadcast mistaken by many listeners for a real Martian invasion, and the consequent skepticism during the presentation of Norman Corwin's Between Americans on 7 December 1941; and the opening night of the Mercury stage flop, Danton's Death. (First broadcast 19 June 1955.)
- "Bullfighting" – Welles tells the true story of Bonito the bull. Robert Flaherty's story was partially filmed in 1942 for Welles's unfinished film, It's All True. (First broadcast 3 July 1955.)

== Reviews and commentary ==
- Ben Walters, The Guardian (17 December 2009) – Although famous as a large actor in every sense, Welles was always more comfortable as a storyteller than performing in character, and in television he felt he had found an ideal platform. He saw it not as a vehicle for spectacle like film or theatre, but as a conversational form like radio, perfect for his preferred role of hands-on narrator or personalised chorus, mediating between audience and tale. The Sketch Book testifies to this sensibility: addressing the camera directly, Welles makes eye contact with his viewers as he holds forth on subjects ranging from "the precious gift of stage fright" to state interference in private life, all the while doodling illustrative sketches on a pad. He fosters an intimate, even conspiratorial tone that makes him an impeccable embodiment of the medium's proverbial status as a guest in the front room ... To our digitally accustomed eyes, the one-to-one timbre of the programme comes off like a monochrome forebear of Skype or YouTube.

== See also ==
- Around the World with Orson Welles, another six-episode series by Orson Welles for British television that aired a few months after Orson Welles' Sketch Book
