= Falk Richter =

German educator, playwright, theatre director (born 1969)

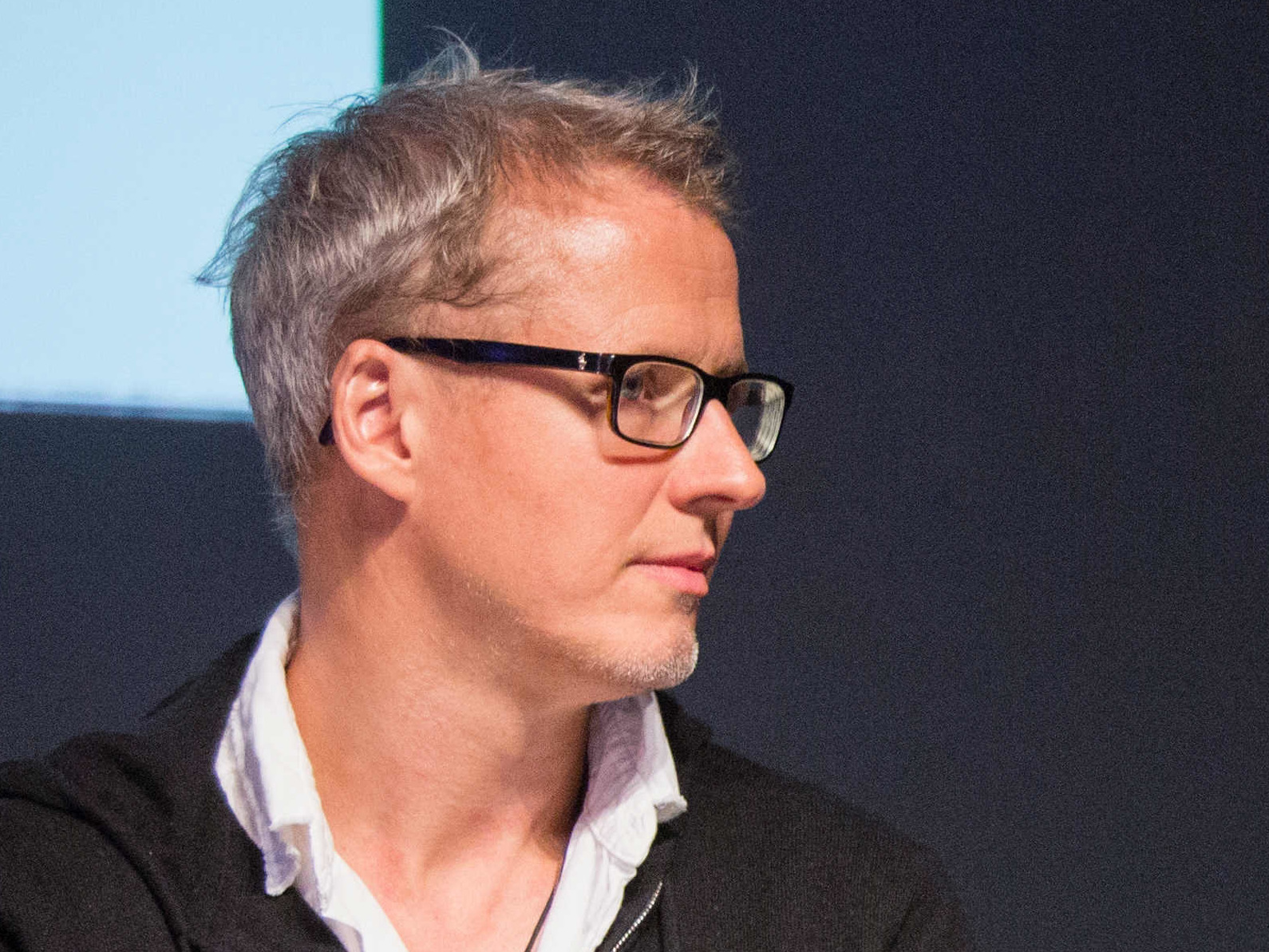
- Falk Richter
- Born: 23 October 1969 (age 56); Hamburg, Germany
- Education: University of Hamburg
- Occupations: Educator, playwright, theatre director
- Years active: Since 1996
- Awards: Teddy Award – Special Teddy Award 2019
- Website: falkrichter.com/EN/home

Falk Richter (born 23 October 1969) is a German educator, playwright and theater director.

== Early life and education ==
Falk Richter was born on 23 October 1969 in Hamburg. His father was a merchant.

He studied linguistics, philosophy and theatre directing at the University of Hamburg, graduating with a production of Silikon at the Kampnagel theatre in 1996.

== Career ==
Richter is the author of theater and audio plays, translator and theatre director who has worked for numerous theatres, including Deutsches Schauspielhaus and the Hamburg State Opera, both in Hamburg; the National Theatre in Oslo, Norway; the Vienna State Opera in Vienna, Austria; and the Bavarian State Opera in Munich.

He was resident director at the Schauspielhaus Zürich in Zurich, Switzerland, from 2000 to 2004; at the Schaubühne in Berlin from 2006 to 2010; and at the Düsseldorfer Schauspielhaus in Düsseldorf from 2011 to 2012.

Since 2015, he has been Artiste associé at the National Theatre of Strasbourg in Strasbourg, France; and since 2017, he has been working as resident director at the Deutsches Schauspielhaus in Hamburg.

Richter was elected "director of the year" by theater critics in a survey of the monthly Theater heute in August 2018. His production of Elfriede Jelinek's play Am Königsweg in Hamburg was voted "production of the year 2018". In February 2019, he received a Special Teddy Award at the Berlin International Film Festival.

Richter was visiting professor for directing at the Ernst Busch Academy of Dramatic Arts in Berlin. In 2019, he started to serve a five-year term as professor of performing arts at the Danish National School of Performing Arts in Copenhagen, Denmark. Starting with the 2020/2021 season, Richter was to be leading director at the Munich Kammerspiele in Munich.

His plays have been translated into more than twenty-five languages and have been produced all over the world.

=== Plays (selection) ===
- Alles in einer Nacht, premiered at the Hamburg Kammerspiele 1996, Fischer-Verlag
- Kult – Geschichten für eine virtuelle Generation, (trilogy)/premiered at the Düsseldorf Schauspielhaus 1996: Portrait Image Konzept (Teil 1), Section (Teil 2), KULT (Teil 3), Fischer-Verlag
- Gott ist ein DJ, premiered at the Staatstheater Mainz 1998, Fischer-Verlag
- Nothing Hurts, premiered in Utrecht 1999, Fischer-Verlag
- Peace, premiered at the Schaubühne am Lehniner Platz 2000, Fischer-Verlag
- Electronic City, (Sieben Sekunden), Fischer-Verlag
- Das System, premiered at the Schaubühne am Lehniner Platz 2004, Fischer-Verlag
- Unter Eis, premiered at Schaubühne am Lehniner Platz 2004, Fischer-Verlag
- Hotel Palestine, premiered at the Schaubühne am Lehniner Platz 2004, Fischer-Verlag
- Die Verstörung, premiered at the Schaubühne am Lehniner Platz 2005, Fischer-Verlag
- Verletzte Jugend, premiered at Festival Liége / Theatre National Bruxelles 2009, Fischer-Verlag
- Trust, premiered at the Schaubühne am Lehniner Platz 2009, Fischer-Verlag
- My Secret Garden, premiered at Festival d'Avignon 2010, L'Arche Éditeur, Paris, 2010, Fischer-Verlag

=== Awards ===
- 2001: Audio play award of the Academy of Arts, Berlin for Nothing hurts – Szenen und Samples, directed by Antje Vowinckel
- 2013: Friedrich Luft Preis for best production in Berlin and Potsdam for the production of For the Disconnected Child at the Schaubühne Berlin
- 2018: Director of the year and Production of the year for the production of Am Königsweg by Elfriede Jelinek at the Deutsches Schauspielhaus in Hamburg, elected by the monthly Theater heute
- 2019: Chevalier de l'Ordre des Arts et des Lettres
- 2019: Special Teddy Award

=== Literature ===
Deiters, Franz-Josef: "'Ich habe also nach einer Form gesucht, Theater als Forum zu begreifen'. Falk Richters Theater des politischen Aktivismus'. In: Franz-Josef Deiters: Neues Welttheater? Zur Mediologie des Theaters der Neo-Avantgarden. Erich Schmidt Verlag, Berlin 2022, pp. 55-84. ISBN 978-3-503-20998-9.
