= Machaho =

- Directed by: Belkacem Hadjadj
- Written by: Belkacem Hadjadj
- Starring: Hadjira Oul Bachir, Belkacem Hadjadj, Meriem Babes, Said Amrane, Salem Aït-Ali-Belkacem, Rachid Hadid
- Music by: Idir
- Production company: Les Films Sur La Place
- Release dates: 1995 (festivals); 19 June 1996 (France)
- Running time: 90 minutes
- Country: Algeria / France
- Languages: Kabyle, Arabic

Machaho is a 1995 Algerian film directed by Belkacem Hadjadj, and distributed in France in 1996. Shot in Kabyle and Arabic, the drama deals with honour, vengeance and tradition in a Kabylie village.

== Synopsis ==
In the mountains of Kabylie, Arezki, a peasant, finds a young man (Larbi) dying, buried in the snow. He brings him home and cares for him through the winter. While recovering, the young man has a secret relationship with Arezki's daughter. Larbi eventually leaves; a few months later the daughter is pregnant. To restore his family's honour, Arezki sets out in search of vengeance.

== Technical details ==
- Director: Belkacem Hadjadj.
- Screenplay: Belkacem Hadjadj.
- Cinematography: Georges Lechaptois, Rachid Merabtine.
- Editing: Rachid Mazouka, Diane Logan.
- Music: Idir.
- Production company: Les Films Sur La Place.
- Format: 35 mm — colour.
- Running time: 90 minutes.
- Release date: 1995

== Cast ==
- Hadjira Oul Bachir — (lead role)
- Belkacem Hadjadj
- Meriem Babes
- Said Amrane
- Salem Aït-Ali-Belkacem
- Rachid Hadid.

== Production and filming ==
The film was produced by Les Films Sur La Place. Shooting took place in Algeria, in the Kabylie region; cinematography credits include Georges Lechaptois and Rachid Merabtine.

== Release and festivals ==
Machaho was screened at the Montpellier Mediterranean Film Festival in 1995 and at several international festivals (Montpellier, Fribourg, San Francisco, among others). Its French theatrical release is listed as 19 June 1996.

== Reception ==
The film received attention on the festival circuit and has been described as a "tragedy of vengeance" paying tribute to Algerian women. Reviews and festival notes present it as an important first feature for Belkacem Hadjadj, filmed in Tamazight (Kabyle) and Arabic.
