= Edo Bertoglio =

Swiss photographer and film director

- Born: 1951 (age 74–75); Lugano, Switzerland
- Occupations: Photographer, Film director
- Website: www.edobertoglio.com

Edo Bertoglio (born 1951 in Lugano) is a Swiss photographer, film director and screenwriter. He is the director of Downtown 81 and Face Addict.

== Life and work ==
Edo Bertoglio received his degree in film directing and editing from the Conservatoire Libre du Cinema Francais in Paris in 1975. In 1976, he moved to New York City, where he worked as a photographer for Italian Vogue, Andy Warhol's Interview and other magazines. He became involved in the downtown art and music scenes of the late 70s and early 80s which led to his participation in the New York/New Wave exhibition at the MoMA PS1 gallery in Long Island City in 1981. During this time, Bertoglio took photos of Andy Warhol, Jean-Michel Basquiat, Debbie Harry, David Bowie, Grace Jones and Madonna among others. One of his most iconic photographs shows the then-unknown Jean-Michel Basquiat wearing an American football helmet with his characteristic crown symbol and the name "AARON" emblazoned on the front. Bertoglio took the picture after spending the night with Basquiat at the Mudd Club. Basquiat stands in front of one of his earliest drawings, "Gringo Pilot (Anola Gay)", which he had produced in the loft of Bertoglio and his then-wife, fashion designer Maripol. Bertoglio also used his experience as a photographer and his familiarity with New York's downtown music scene to create photographic work for LP covers. He completed numerous assignments for Atlantic, Arista, Chrysalis Records, and Warner Brothers Records and was eventually hired to shoot Blondie's epochal 'Parallel Lines' cover. He also photographed Madonna for the cover of her debut album 'Madonna' in 1983. However, the final version was then shot by photographer Gary Heery. Bertoglio was also assigned to shoot The Bongos for RCA Records and for GQ Magazine. He also worked on Glenn O'Brien's late-night countercultural talk show TV Party.

In 1980, Bertoglio and Maripol secured backing from Rizzoli, through Fiorucci, to produce a film written by Glenn O'Brien about the No Wave music scene and the general Lower East Side milieu. The film, entitled New York Beat, was directed by Bertoglio and starred the young graffiti writer and future artist Jean-Michel Basquiat. The film is a bizarre urban fairy tale and to O'Brian "an exaggerated version of life". The no-wave bands DNA, Tuxedomoon, The Plastics, James Chance and the Contortions, and others appear in the movie, as well as Kid Creole and the Coconuts. Fab Five Freddy, Deborah Harry and others play bit parts. After shooting finished in January 1981 Rizzoli pulled out of funding the project, and footage lay unedited for almost 20 years until it was released under the title Downtown 81 in 2000.

Bertoglio left New York for his hometown of Lugano, Switzerland, in 1990. He later returned to the world of Downtown 81, writing and directing the film Face Addict, where he also plays the main part. The film was released in 2005. Bertoglio embarks on a journey through the memories of New York in the punk era and talks about the past and the present with friends from back then (Maripol, Walter Steding, Deborah Harry, John Lurie, Glenn O’Brien, Wendy Whitelaw, James Nares, Victor Bockris and others). «Before I was addicted to drugs I was addicted to faces. In New York I would fall in love every five minutes», Bertoglio says in the beginning of the film. His return to New York is also a journey to the roots of his own creativity and the abysses of his existence. In addition to the joy of reuniting with those who survived the drug and AIDS epidemic of the 1980s, Bertoglio is haunted by the demons of the past. He is confronted once again with the "defeated" addiction and its ever-present temptation. "I am a survivor", he notes. A poetic pseudo-documentary mixing original footage with retrospective commentary, the film was less critically or commercially successful than Downtown 81.

In 2008 Bertoglio had a solo show at the Pack Galleria d'arte in Milan where he indulged his fetish obsession with slot cars. In 2010–2011 Bertoglio shot a series of portraits of women in Switzerland ("Ladies"). The work was shown at Cortesi Contemporary, Lugano in 2014 ("Edo Bertoglio – RINGFLASH"). In 2022, Bertoglio launched an NFT of a portrait of Jean-Michel Basquiat that he had taken in his New York loft in 1981.

Edo Bertoglio currently lives in Lugano, producing and directing television commercials and programs for Swiss TV.
