= Marine Hugonnier =

French and British filmmaker and contemporary artist

Marine Hugonnier (born 1969) is a French and British filmmaker and contemporary artist.

== Biography ==
Hugonnier was born in France, and grew up in the USA and France. She has been living in London, UK, since 1998.

She studied philosophy, anthropology and history of art in Paris, France.

She holds a PhD from the Center for Experimental and Documentary Film at the Westminster University, London UK. She also teaches at the Hochschule (MA Film), University of the Applied Sciences, Luzern, Switzerland.

In 1990 she was an intern on the installation of the exhibition PASSAGES DE L'IMAGE at the Centre Georges Pompidou in Paris. There she had a chance to meet and assist influential artists, filmmakers and photographers including Chris Marker, Michael Snow, Gary Hill, Thierry Kuntzel and Jeff Wall. These experiences, although brief, proved life-changing to Hugonnier – who refers to this formative time as "learning a new grammar".

Hugonnier career as an artist started in 2000 with a solo exhibition at Chantal Crousel Gallery in Paris. Her work has been since shown both in film festivals, in public and private foundations and cultural institutions internationally.

== Work ==
Hugonnier has produced twelve medium length films, for which she has received public and critical acknowledgement. These narrative films, which are a record of her travels, map the politics of vision.

For example ARIANA (2003), set in Afghanistan, questions the concept of 'panorama': as a military stand point, a camera movement, and its origin in the pre-cinematographic entertainment of the 19th century. THE LAST TOUR (2004) is concerned with the tourist’s gaze and the limits of visibility; while TRAVELLING AMAZONIA (2006) re-enacts the building of the Trans-Amazonian highway through the building of a travelling shot. In Apicula Enigma (‘The Riddle of the Bees) (2013), Hugonnier reveals film and image-making as products of the subjective experience of their creators by focusing more on the film crew at work than the bees’ activities, contrary to what the title suggests. Hugonnier is also known for her ongoing collage series, ART FOR MODERN ARCHITECTURE (2004-ongoing), for which she intervenes on the front pages of newspapers, covering the original pictures with colours of the Kodak standard chart. The obliterated images still loom, recalling the viewer's own memory as well as a collective consciousness.

Marine Hugonnier has been the subject of solo exhibitions, including: Cinema in the guts, Le Jeu de Paume, Paris, (2022),le cinéma à l'estomac, Galería NoguerasBlanchard, Madrid, SP (2018) Apicula Enigma, BALTIC Centre for Contemporary Art, Gateshead, UK (2014); Films Works: Marine Hugonnier, Museum of Contemporary Arts, Seoul, South Korea (2014); Apparent Positions: Ariana, The Sainsbury Centre for Visual Arts, Norwich, UK (2013); Malmö Konsthall, Sweden ( 2009); Villa Romana, Florence, Italy (2009); Kunstverein Braunschweig, Germany (2009); Musée D’Art Moderne et Contemporain - MAMCO, Geneva, Switzerland (2008); S.M.A.K. Stedelijk Museum voor Actuele Kunst, Ghent, Belgium (2007); Trilogy, Philadelphia Museum of Art, Philadelphia (2007); Stop & Go, Fondazione Sandretto Re Rebaudengo, Turin, Italy (2007); Kunsthalle Bern, Switzerland ( 2007); Centre for Curatorial Studies Museum, Bard College, New York, USA (2005); Chisenhale Gallery, London, UK (2003).

== Bibliography ==
- Newman, Michael; Brenez, Nicole; Guerra, Carles (2022). Hugonnier, Marine; Ponsa, Marta (eds.). Marine Hugonnier: Cinema in the Guts. Silvana. ISBN 9788836651313.
  - Newman, Michael; Braidotti, Rosi; Burdeau, Emmanuel; Guerra, Carles (2022). Moukouri, Laetitia (ed.). Le cinéma à l'estomac: Marine Hugonnier. Translated by Vieillescazes, Nicolas; de Kayser, Thomas. Silvana editoriale. ISBN 9788836651368.
- Hugonnier, Marine; Derieux, Florence; Fabricius, Jacob; Wagner, Hilke (2009). Marine Hugonnier. Malmö konsthall., Kunstverein Braunschweig., Fonds régional d'art contemporain Champagne-Ardenne. Zurich: JRP/Ringier. ISBN 978-3037640791. OCLC 495780258.
- Hugonnier, Marine (2007). A film trilogy. Philadelphia Museum of Art., Fondazione Sandretto Re Rebaudengo per l'arte., Kunsthalle Bern. Philadelphia: Philadelphia Museum of Art. ISBN 978-3865883933. OCLC 218679606.
- Hugonnier, Marine (2004). Marine Hugonnier. Newman, Michael, 1954-, Millar, Jeremy., Cooke, Lynne., Dundee Contemporary Arts (Art center). London: Film and Video Umbrella. ISBN 1904270123. OCLC 71786907.
