= Filipa César =

Portuguese filmmaker

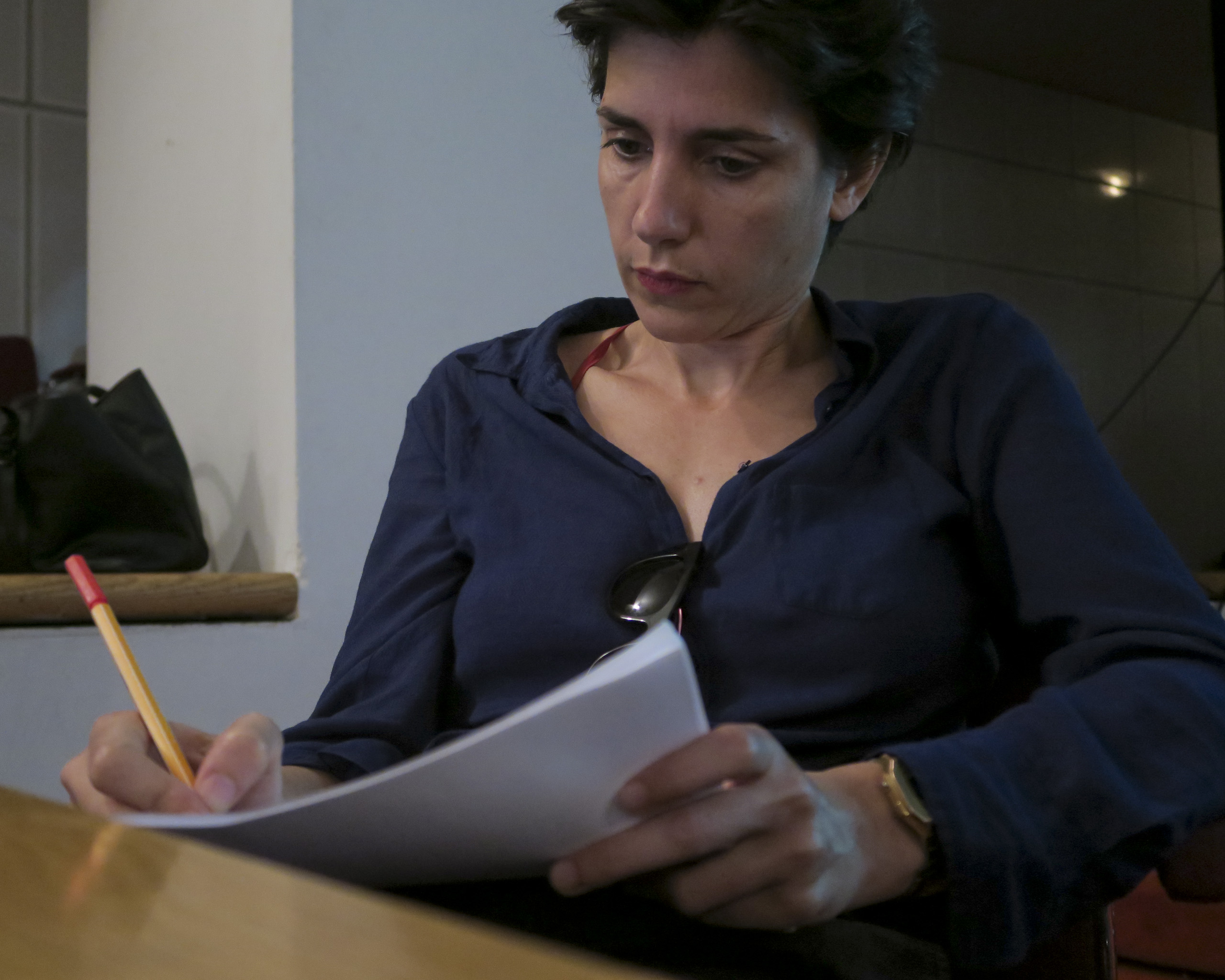
- Filipa César, 2016
- Born: 1975; Porto, Portugal
- Education: Berlin University of the Arts
- Occupations: Artist and filmmaker

Filipa César (born 1975 in Portugal) is an artist and filmmaker. She lives and works in Germany, and studied at the Faculty of Arts in Porto and Lisbon (1996–99) and the Academy of Fine Arts, Munich (1999–2000). She obtained an MA in "Art in Context", from the Berlin University of the Arts (2007). Since April 2021 César has been a professor at Merz Akademie in Stuttgart, Germany.

César has exhibited, among other places, at the Istanbul Biennial, 2003; the Kunsthalle Wien (Vienna), 2004; the Serralves Museum, Porto, 2005; the Locarno International Film Festival, 2005; the CAG- Contemporary Art Gallery, Vancouver, 2006; the Tate Modern, London, 2007; the Kunstmuseum St. Gallen, Switzerland 2007; the International Triennale of Contemporary Art in Prague, 2008; as well as at SF MOMA, San Francisco 2009, the 12th Architecture Biennial, Venice, and the 29th São Paulo Biennial 2010, and at Manifesta 8 in Cartagena.

== Filmography ==
- Conakry (2013)
- Mined Soil (2014)
- Transmission from the Liberated Zones (2015), Berlinale 2016
- Spell Reel (2017)
- Sunstone (2017)
- Skola di Tarafe (2022)

== Installations ==
- F for Fake (2005)
- Rapport (2007)
- Le Passeur (2008)
- The Four Chambered Heart (2009)
- Memograma (2010)
- Calouste Gulbenkian Foundation (2019)
- Project Quantum Creole (2019)
