= Loren Ghiglione =

American journalist, editor, and journalism educator and dean

- Born: April 5, 1941; New York City, U.S.
- Education: Haverford College; Yale University; George Washington University
- Occupation(s): Journalist, editor, journalism educator and dean
- Employer: Medill School of Journalism
- Title: Professor Emeritus
- Awards: Ida B. Wells Award Winner (1987); Distinguished Service to Journalism History Award Winner (2010)
- Website: www.medill.northwestern.edu/directory/faculty/loren-ghiglione.html

Loren Frank Ghiglione (born April 5, 1941) is an American journalist, editor, and journalism educator and dean. He has worked as a part of journalism professionally for over 45 years, and was awarded the Ida B. Wells Award from the National Association of Black Journalists, as well as the Distinguished Service to Journalism History Award from the American Journalism Historians Association. In 2001 he decided to focus his career around education, working as a professor for universities such as Emory University, University of Central Florida, and Northwestern University.

== Background ==
Loren Frank Ghiglione was born in New York City on April 5, 1941, to William John and Rita Bell (Haskin). He received his B.A. degree from Haverford College, Ph.D. in American Civilization from George Washington University, and master's degree in Urban Studies and J.D. from Yale University. While an undergraduate, Ghiglione was a student journalist for the Haverford News. He also earned seven fellowships from universities such as Harvard and Yale.

== Career ==
Ghiglione began his Journalism career at 28 years old, when he purchased and edited the Southbridge Evening News in Southbridge, Massachusetts. Purchasing additional newspapers in surrounding communities, he built a newspaper network, Worcester County Newspapers. eventually expanding to newspapers in Connecticut over a period of 26 years. Due to his work at Worcester County Newspapers, Ghiglione earned two dozen regional and national awards for his editorial writing. In 1989, Ghiglione was elected president of the American Society of Newspaper Editors (ASNE) while still running Worcester County Newspapers. Ghiglione helped establish committees for disabilities as well as Journalism history. As president of the ASNE he also advocated for bigger diversity of both race and gender in the newsroom. In the years 1995–1996, Ghiglione worked as a consultant to the Freedom Forum during the creation of the Newseum. In the years that followed, Ghiglione pursued teaching. He was a professor and director at Emory University's Journalism program between 1996 and 1999. From 1999 to 2001 he worked as the director of the Journalism program at The University of Southern California. Following USC, Ghiglione worked as the dean of Northwestern's Medill School of Journalism from 2001 to 2006, only to step down and become a professor of Media Ethics at Medill. His efforts to preserve Journalism history resulted in him winning the Distinguished Service to Journalism History Award in 2010. Ghiglione announced his retirement as a professor in June 2017. His work on diversity was recognized at his academic institutions, and at the national level.

== Works ==
Ghiglione is best known for his biography of journalist Don Hollenbeck, published in 2008. In the book, he recalls adversities Hollenbeck faced in the 1940s and 1950s. Ghilione is also known for writing articles for various sources such as "Traveling with Twain" as well as his articles in the Stonebridge Press and Worcester County Newspapers

Books edited:

- Evaluating the press: the New England daily newspaper survey (1973)
- Improving newswriting : the best of the Bulletin of the American Society of Newspapers Editors (1982)
- Buying and selling of America's newspapers (1984)
- Rodell revisited : selected writings of Fred Rodell (1994)
- Radio's revolution : Don Hollenbeck's CBS views the press (2008)

Books written:

- American journalist : paradox of the press (1990)
- CBS's Don Hollenbeck : an honest reporter in the age of McCarthyism (2008)

Exhibits:

- The American Journalist: Paradox of the Press, a 1991 Library of Congress exhibit.

== Awards ==
- 1987: Ida B. Wells Award
- 2010: Distinguished Service to Journalism History Award

== See also ==
- National Association of Black Journalists Hall of Fame
