= The Spirit of Charles Lindbergh =

- Directed by: Orson Welles
- Written by: Orson Welles
- Produced by: Orson Welles
- Starring: Orson Welles
- Cinematography: Gary Graver
- Release date: 1984
- Running time: 3 minutes
- Country: United States
- Language: English

The Spirit of Charles Lindbergh is a short film made in 1984 by Orson Welles. The film was intended as a private video letter from Welles to his longtime friend and accountant Bill Cronshaw, who was ill. In the film, Welles sits behind a typewriter at his desk and speaks of the human spirit, quoting the journal of aviator Charles Lindbergh. Welles was in visibly poor health himself when the film was made, and he did not intend for it to be seen by the public.

== Production ==
The Spirit of Charles Lindbergh was the last film project completed by Orson Welles in his lifetime. After Welles's death in 1985, all of his unfinished films were bequeathed to his long-term companion and mistress Oja Kodar, and she in turn donated many of them (including The Spirit of Charles Lindbergh) to the Munich Film Museum for preservation and restoration. In 2000 the Munich Film Museum released a digitally restored version of the complete three minutes of footage, which has subsequently been screened at numerous film festivals.

Although the restored footage has never been released on video or DVD, a brief clip of the unrestored footage can be seen at the end of Vassili Slovic's 1995 documentary Orson Welles: the One-Man Band.
