= Simone Aughterlony =

New Zealand dancer & choreographer (born 1977)

Simone Aughterlony (born 1977) is a New Zealand dancer and choreographer based in Europe.

== Early life ==
Aughterlony was born in New Zealand in 1977. She grew up in Dunedin and in 1992 she won the Dulcie Malcolm Scholarship to attend the New Zealand School of Dance. She graduated from the school in 1995.

== Career ==
Aughterlony moved to Europe in 2000. She joined American choreographer Meg Stuart's group Damaged Goods in Brussels, followed by work with the British theatre and performance group Forced Entertainment and the filmmaker and director Jorge León. From 2004 she has also been working on her own projects such as the solo works “Public Property” (2004) and “We need to talk” (2011). From 2013, with Gessnerallee in Zurich and the Hebbel am Ufer in Berlin, she co-produced a trilogy of duos: “Show and Tell”, “After Life” and “Supernatural”, which examine the body under extreme conditions.

=== Recognition ===
In 2015, Aughterlony won Outstanding Female Performer at the Swiss Dance Awards.
