= Face Addict =

2005 film

Face Addict is a 2005 documentary film directed by Edo Bertoglio which explores his own past in the New York arts and music scene of the 1970s and 1980s and a number of members of the scene both living and dead.
