= John Mankiewicz =

American screenwriter and producer

- Born: February 18, 1954 (age 72); New York City, New York, U.S.
- Occupations: Television producer, television writer, screenwriter
- Parent(s): Ilene Thelma Korsen; Don Mankiewicz
- Family: Mankiewicz

John Mankiewicz (born February 18, 1954) is an American television and film executive producer and screenwriter. He was co-executive producer for House of Cards and Bosch. He co-created the television series The Street and has written and produced episodes for House M.D. and occasionally writes for The New Yorker.

He was born in New York City the son of Ilene Thelma (Korsen) and screenwriter Don Mankiewicz, a member of the Mankiewicz family. He is the grandson of screenwriter Herman J. Mankiewicz who co-wrote Citizen Kane. He is also a cousin of Ben Mankiewicz, Josh Mankiewicz and Nick Davis.
