= TriBeCa (TV series) =

- Genre: Drama
- Created by: David J. Burke
- Starring: Philip Bosco; Joe Morton
- Opening theme: Me Phi Me ("Keep It Going")
- Composers: James McVay (1.7); Lisa Harlow Stark (1.7); Eddie Jobson (1.2, 1.4); Anton Sanko (1.6); Galt MacDermot (1.3); Peter Lurye (1.6)
- Country of origin: United States
- Original language: English
- No. of seasons: 1
- No. of episodes: 7

Production
- Executive producers: David J. Burke; Robert De Niro; Jane Rosenthal
- Running time: 60 minutes
- Production companies: Montana Beach Productions; TriBeCa Productions; TriStar Television

Original release
- Network: Fox
- Release: March 23 – May 4, 1993

TriBeCa (also known as Tribeca) is a television drama anthology series created by David J. Burke and co-produced with Robert De Niro and Jane Rosenthal for TriBeCa Productions in 1993 that aired on the Fox Network. The series theme song, "Keep It Going," was performed by the alternative hip hop artist Me Phi Me.

For his performance in the lead role of Martin McHenry in the season opener, "The Box," Laurence Fishburne won a Primetime Emmy Award for Outstanding Guest Actor in a Drama Series.

Noted for attracting "actors, screenwriters and directors of uncommon quality," and set in New York City's lower Manhattan neighborhood of TriBeCa, the series was aired by the Fox Broadcasting Company. Guest stars included Eli Wallach, Kevin Spacey, Kathleen Quinlan, Melanie Mayron, Judith Malina, Carl Lumbly, Richard Lewis, Carol Kane, Richard Kiley, Dizzy Gillespie and Danny Aiello III.

Directors and screenwriters included David J. Burke, Hans Tobeason, John Mankiewicz of the prolific Mankiewicz family, Barry Primus, Bryan Spicer, Jeffrey Solomon and several actors in the series, among others.

Despite critical acclaim, Fox cancelled the show after seven episodes because of low ratings, although the existing episodes were rerun in the summer. Fishburne's Emmy win came in September, months after the show had been cancelled.

== Cast ==
=== Main ===
- Philip Bosco as Harry Arsharsky, owner of Zadies café, a large neighborhood eatery which served as a hub for the stories. Harry was a college professor in the late 1960s but was dismissed for his anti-establishment leanings.
- Joe Morton as NYPD mounted officer Carleton Thomas. He is married to an artist, Tori (Tamara Tunie).

=== Supporting ===
- Antonia Jones as Sarah, a waitress at Zadies
- Michael Rogen as Albert, a cook at Zadies

== Episodes ==
No.	Title	Directed by	Written by	Original release date
1	"The Box"	Michael Dinner	David J. Burke, Hans Tobeason	March 23, 1993
A successful Black banker is murdered during a robbery in Battery Park, leading his younger brother, an NYPD officer, on a journey of anger, vengeance and budding love for his brother's young widow and children. Guest stars: Laurence Fishburne, Carl Lumbly, Victoria Dillard, Kiely Williams et al. Melanie Mayron and Stephen Lang make brief, uncredited appearances in character ahead of the episodes they were later featured in ("Stepping Back" and "Honor," respectively).
2	"Honor"	David J. Burke	David J. Burke, Hans Tobeason	March 30, 1993
A homeless veteran confronts rejection by society while he struggles to fulfill his promise to bury a fellow homeless Marine at sea. Guest stars: Stephen Lang, Keith David, Tamara Tunie et al.
3	"The Hopeless Romantic"	Barry Primus	Lenore Kletter	April 6, 1993
A young woman comes to grips with her father's lifestyle as a con man who preys on older women, including Harry's sister. Guest stars: Peter Boyle, Cara Buono, Ron Eldard et al.
4	"Heros Exoletus"	Bryan Spicer	David J. Burke, Hans Tobeason	April 13, 1993
After a musician's suicide, Harry and other close friends of the deceased recount to a young aspiring writer his journey from counterculture icon to commercial success to burned-out drug addict. Guest stars: Kevin Spacey, Ernie Hudson, Kathleen Quinlan, Casey Siemaszko et al.
5	"The Rainmaker"	Helaine Head	John Mankiewicz	April 20, 1993
Two lives converge: a once-prominent theater star turned acting coach who wants to reclaim past glories and a young attorney watching his own life heading toward professional monotony and docile suburban existence. Guest stars: Richard Kiley, Jeffrey DeMunn, Betty Buckley, Jesse Bradford, Lisa Eichhorn, Caroline Kava, Tamara Tunie et al.
6	"The Loft"	Joe Morton	Jeffrey Solomon, Hans Tobeason, David J. Burke	April 27, 1993
Harry rents a vacant loft in a building he owns to three recent college graduates seeking to start lives in the city. When the girl disappears after being mistaken for a serial robber and jailed, the boys spend the night searching the neighborhood for her. Guest stars: Rya Kihlstedt, Mark Rosenthal, Danny Zorn, Dizzy Gillespie, Bill Irwin et al.
7	"Stepping Back"	Melanie Mayron	Melanie Mayron	May 4, 1993
An architect who breaks up with her boyfriend because she is afraid of change and commitment begins to notice that life is passing her by. Guest stars: Melanie Mayron, Richard Lewis, Carol Kane, Adam Arkin, Eileen Brennan, Eli Wallach, Rita Karin et al.
