= Don Mankiewicz =

American screenwriter (1922–2015)

- Born: Don Martin Mankiewicz; January 20, 1922; Berlin, Germany
- Died: April 25, 2015 (aged 93); Monrovia, California, U.S.
- Education: Columbia University
- Occupations: Novelist; Screenwriter
- Years active: 1953–1977
- Known for: Trial (novel)
- Spouses: Ilene Korsen (m. 1946; div. 1972); Carol Bell Guidi (m. 1972)
- Children: 4
- Parent(s): Sara (née Aaronson); Herman J. Mankiewicz
- Family: Mankiewicz

Don Martin Mankiewicz (January 20, 1922 – April 25, 2015) was an American screenwriter and novelist best known for his novel Trial.

== Early life ==
Born in Berlin, Germany, he was the son of Sara (née Aaronson) and the screenwriter Herman J. Mankiewicz and brother of journalist Frank Mankiewicz. He graduated from Columbia College of Columbia University in 1942.

== Career ==
His 1955 novel Trial won the Harper Prize and was made into a film of the same name. He was nominated for an Academy Award for Best Adapted Screenplay for I Want to Live! (1958). Among his many television credits are Ironside, for which he wrote the pilot, the Star Trek episode "Court Martial", and the mini-series adaptation of President John F. Kennedy's book Profiles in Courage. His college classmate, the novelist and journalist, Gordon Cotler was a frequent creative partner, including: Lanigan's Rabbi, Rosetti and Ryan, The Bait, McMillan & Wife, and The Black Bird.

== Personal life ==
Mankiewicz married Ilene Korsen on March 26, 1946, and divorced her in 1972. He married Carol Bell Guidi on July 1, 1972. Mankiewicz had 2 children with Ilene (Jane and John). He had two children with Carol (Jan and Sandy). His son is screenwriter and producer John Mankiewicz. Jane is a fiction writer published in The New Yorker.

=== Death ===
Mankiewicz died on April 25, 2015, at his home in Monrovia, California at age 93 of congestive heart failure. He was survived by his wife of 40 years and his four children.

== Novels ==
- See How They Run (1951)
- Trial (1955)
- It Only Hurts a Minute (1966)

== Filmography ==
=== Films ===
Year	Film	Credit	Notes
1953	Fast Company	Adaption by	
1954	The Big Moment	Written by	
1955	Trial	Written by	Based on the novel of the same name
1957	House Of Numbers	Screenplay by	Co-Wrote screenplay with Russell Rouse, Based on the novel House Of Numbers by Jack Finney
1958	Le imprese di una spada leggendaria	Screenplay by	
1958	I Want to Live!	Screenplay by	Co-Wrote screenplay with Nelson Gidding
1962	The Chapman Report	Screenplay by	Co-Wrote screenplay with Wyatt Emory Cooper, Gene Allen, and Grant Stuart, Based on the novel The Chapman Report by Irving Wallace
1962	The Road to the Wall	Screenplay by	
1965	Who Has Seen the Wind?	Screenplay by	Based on the novel The Land Bird By Tad Mosel
1967	A Man Called Ironside	Screenplay by	Co-Wrote screenplay with Collier Young, TV Pilot for "Ironside"
1968	Split Second to an Epitaph	Screenplay by	Co-Wrote screenplay with Sy Salkowitz
1973	The Bait	Screenplay by	Co-Wrote screenplay with Gordon Colter, Based on the novel "The Bait" by Dorothy Uhnak
1975	The Black Bird	Story by	Co-Wrote Story with Gordon Colter
1979	Sanctuary of Fear	Screenplay by, Supervising Producer	
1983	I Want to Live	Screenplay by	Remake of the 1958 Film of The Same Name

=== Television ===
Year	TV Series	Credit	Notes
1950–53	Studio One in Hollywood	Writer	2 Episodes
1951	Schlitz Playhouse	Writer	1 Episode
1953	Your Jeweler's Showcase	Writer	1 Episode
1955	TV Reader's Digest	Writer	1 Episode
1955	Lux Video Theatre	Writer	1 Episode
1955	The Joseph Cotten Show	Writer	1 Episode
1955	Star Stage	Writer	2 Episodes
1956	The Ford Television Theater	Writer	1 Episode
1957	Playhouse 90	Writer	1 Episode
1958	Kraft Television Theatre	Writer	2 Episodes
1959	Armchair Theatre	Writer	1 Episode
1959–61	One Step Beyond	Writer	6 Episodes
1961	Bus Stop	Writer	1 Episode
1961–63	Armstrong Circle Theatre	Writer	4 Episodes
1962	The DuPont Show of the Week	Writer	1 Episode
1962	General Electric Theater	Writer	1 Episode
1964–65	Profiles in Courage	Writer	6 Episodes
1966	Hawk	Writer	2 Episodes
1966	The Trials of O'Brien	Writer	1 Episode
1967	Star Trek: The Original Series	Writer	1 Episode
1967–68	Ironside	Writer	5 Episodes
1969	Mannix	Writer	1 Episode
1969–70	Marcus Welby, M.D.	Writer	2 Episodes
1971	Sarge	Writer	1 Episode
1973–77	McMillan & Wife	Writer	3 Episodes
1976–77	Lanigan's Rabbi	Writer, Supervising Producer	2 Episodes
1977	Rosetti and Ryan	Writer	2 Episodes
1982–83	Hart to Hart	Executive Script Consultant	14 Episodes
1983	Simon & Simon	Writer, Executive Story Consultant	
1983	Murder Ink	Writer	Television Movie
1985	Crazy Like a Fox	Executive Story Consultant	4 Episodes
1986	MacGyver	Writer	1 Episode
1987	Adderly	Executive Story Consultant	1 Episode
1995	The Marshal	Writer	1 Episode

== See also ==
Mankiewicz family
