= Nick Davis Productions =

American production company

Nick Davis Productions (NDP) is an American production company founded by writer, filmmaker, and television producer Nick Davis in 2001.

== History ==
The company's first project was a Bravo Profile of actor Gene Wilder, followed closely by A&E’s New York at the Movies, hosted by Meryl Streep.

NDP went on to make the Hugo Award-winning series, Stories of the Innocence Project, which explored the role of DNA testing in exonerating the wrongfully imprisoned. Stories of the Innocence Project aired on Court TV from 2004 to 2006. NDP, also for Court TV, produced The Chief, a one-hour special about a detective from Philadelphia, Pennsylvania, who comes to Shawnee, Oklahoma, to run their police department and shake up the sleepy Midwestern town. The Chief aired on Court TV in 2006.

In the television industry, NDP worked on projects including Making News: Texas Style, a 13-part verite series which illustrates the ins and outs of a TV news production company. They made created a second season titled Making News: Savannah Style, featuring the same thematic concept but a new neighborhood. Addition, NDP created Bobby G: Adventure Capitalist, an 8-episode series currently airing on MOJO.

NDP completed a feature-length documentary about Team Slipstream, a cycling team devoted to cleaning up its scandal-ridden sport, which will air on the Sundance Channel in 2009. Plans for 2009 also include a new show for the Science Channel and a pilot for The Learning Channel.

In 2018, NDP produced and directed a film for PBS' American Masters program, Ted Williams: "The Greatest Hitter Who Ever Lived," narrated by Emmy- and Golden Globe-winning actor Jon Hamm. The New York Post called it "excellent," saying, "It provides a warts-and-all portrayal of one of the game’s most fascinating historical figures."

In 2021, Davis produced and directed "Leaving Tracks", a feature-length documentary that tells the life story of Robert Haas (Bobby), the founder of the Haas Moto Museum. "Leaving Tracks" has appeared at over 15 film festivals worldwide, including DocuFest, Montreal Independent Film Festival, New York International Film Festival, and Oniros, where it won Best Documentary Feature.

In 2021, NDP directed a four-part "30 for 30" ESPN film on the 1986 New York Mets titled Once Upon a Time in Queens. The film, which premiered on September 14 and 15, 2021, was produced in partnership with ESPN Films, Jimmy Kimmel's Kimmelot, ITV America, and Major League Baseball.
