= Ben Mankiewicz =

American television host (born 1967)

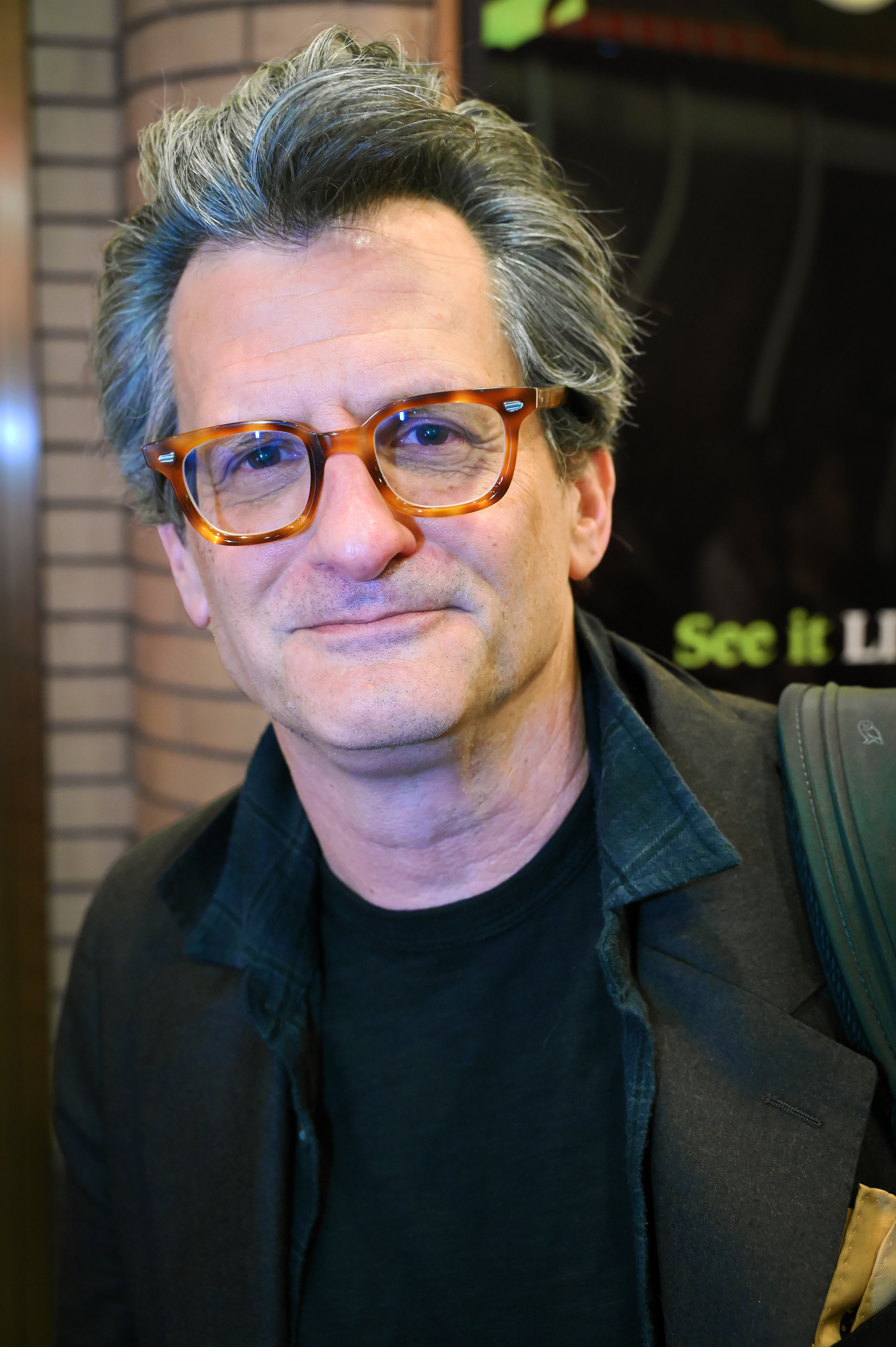
- Mankiewicz in 2026
- Born: Benjamin Frederick Mankiewicz; March 25, 1967 (age 59); Washington, D.C., U.S.
- Education: Tufts University (BA); Columbia University (MS)
- Occupations: Television host; podcast host; film critic; journalist
- Political party: Democratic
- Spouses: Contessa Kellogg (m. 2005; div. 2009) Lee Russo (m. 2013)
- Children: 1
- Parent(s): Frank Mankiewicz; Holly Mankiewicz
- Family: Mankiewicz

Benjamin Frederick Mankiewicz (born March 25, 1967) is an American television journalist and host for Turner Classic Movies (TCM). He is a progressive political commentator for The Young Turks. He has served as a film critic for the 2008–2009 season for the TV program At the Movies and the web series What the Flick?!

A descendant of the Mankiewicz family, Ben Mankiewicz graduated from Tufts University, and earned a master's degree from Columbia University's Graduate School of Journalism. He subsequently worked as a news reporter and anchor, first for WCSC-TV in Charleston, South Carolina and later for WAMI in Miami. Mankiewicz left news journalism, and auditioned as a television host for Turner Classic Movies.

Mankiewicz was hired in 2003 as an afternoon weekend host, second to Robert Osborne, who was the channel's primetime host. In 2013, for health reasons, Osborne delegated weekday primetime hosting appearances to Mankiewicz. In 2017, Osborne died at the age of 84, and Mankiewicz became the network's primetime host. Additionally, he hosts the TCM-produced podcast series, The Plot Thickens and Talking Pictures.

== Early life ==
Mankiewicz was born in Washington, D.C., to press secretary Frank Mankiewicz and Holly Mankiewicz (née Jolley). His father was of German Jewish descent, and his mother was a Mormon. He is the cousin of screenwriter Tom Mankiewicz and filmmaker/television producer Nick Davis, the grandson of screenwriter Herman J. Mankiewicz, the grand-nephew of screenwriter, producer, and director Joseph L. Mankiewicz, and the brother of NBC News reporter Josh Mankiewicz.

Mankiewicz attended Georgetown Day School for his primary and secondary education. After graduating, he next enrolled into Tufts University. After his sophomore year, he interned at The George Michael Sports Machine, and "then came back the next year and worked for Glenn Brenner." In 1992, he received a Master of Science degree from Columbia University's Graduate School of Journalism with an emphasis in broadcast journalism.

== Career ==
=== 1993–2003: Journalism ===
Mankiewicz was hired as a sports producer for WJLA-TV, the ABC affiliate in Washington, D.C., and next as a producer for the sports radio station WTEM. By 1993, he was working as an on-air reporter for WCSC-TV (a CBS affiliate) in Charleston, South Carolina.

Mankiewicz joined WAMI in Miami, Florida, in 1998, where he served as anchor of The Times, a daily news magazine show and the station's highlight program. On July 28, 1998, Mankiewicz was assaulted with a lead pipe across the upper left thigh when he arrived unannounced at Meir Vaknin's house to interview him about allegations that his family's Miami-Dade County moving company, Atlantic Express, was overcharging customers. Mankiewicz said at the time, "I thought he was going to show me some documents or something. I never thought he'd hit me. I'm not a brave man." The incident was partially captured on videotape. WAMI turned over the tapes to Lauderhill police after they had aired the story. On August 4, Vaknin turned himself into the Broward County jail, where he was charged with felony battery.

Mankiewicz left WAMI not wanting to work in television news any longer and was in search for another television job. "I auditioned for every show on television: reality shows, game shows," Mankiewicz stated. "I must have auditioned for 120 shows, including, I'm ashamed to say, Are You Hot? — and not as one of the judges."

=== 2003–present: Turner Classic Movies ===
By the early 2000s, network executives at Turner Classic Movies (TCM) began noticing high viewership numbers during the afternoon weekend hours. In early 2003, they held auditions in Century City, Los Angeles for an on-air host to serve the time slot. Mankiewicz was given his first audition, which was to compare Seven Samurai (1954) and The Magnificent Seven (1960) following a screening with two other applicants. He passed, and his second audition was reading an introduction to The Bishop's Wife (1947) from a teleprompter. He returned home, where he asked his then-girlfriend to watch TCM, which was airing The Barefoot Contessa (1954), directed by his grand-uncle Joseph L. Mankiewicz.

In 2003, Mankiewicz was hired as a host for Turner Classic Movies, making his debut appearance on September 6. At the time, he was the network's second host with Robert Osborne as the first. To avoid imitating Osborne's style, Mankiewicz chose a loose, more casual demeanor, including sporting a goatee. According to Charles Tabesh, TCM's senior vice president of programming, this was encouraged. He reflected: "we really emphasized the differences [between them]. We asked him to have a goatee. We had him in a set that was a downtown loft, and his scripts were much less reverential." Furthermore, Mankiewicz frequently uses sardonic humor in his on-air introductions; before a broadcast of Gigi (1958), he once joked the film was not to be confused with "Gigli, the 'Bennifer' disaster that won't get anywhere near the Oscars." According to Vanity Fair, Mankiewicz's early appearances were disliked among older network audiences. Years since, he has worn more formal attire and adopted a clean-shaven image.

In 2012, desiring a reduced schedule due to past health concerns, Osborne began delegating weekday primetime hosting appearances over to Mankiewicz by the following year. Mankiewicz's on-air appearances were also expanded to host the weekend programming blocks: Silent Sunday Nights and TCM Imports. In 2019, Jacqueline Stewart and Alicia Malone, respectively, were made the latest hosts for each block. In 2016, TCM partnered with The Criterion Collection to launch a streaming service, FilmStruck. In 2018, the service added a curated collection branded as the "TCM Select," which featured exclusive introductions by Mankiewicz. In November of the same year, FilmStruck ceased operations.

In March 2017, Osborne died at the age of 84. Mankiewicz commemorated him in a post: "All of us at TCM are better for having known him – I know I am. His legacy is reflected in the shared love and appreciation we all have for the movies he cared so deeply about." He succeeded Osborne as the channel's primetime host. As of 2026, Mankiewicz hosts the primetime lineup from Wednesdays to Sundays (his colleagues Dave Karger and Alicia Malone host the primetime lineup on Mondays and Tuesdays, respectively).

In 2020, TCM and Mankiewicz launched an original podcast series titled The Plot Thickens, with the first season chronicling Peter Bogdanovich's filmmaking career. A year later, the first season was named a Webby Honoree for Television & Film Podcasts, and again in 2022 and 2023. The Plot Thickens was also awarded the Best Branded Podcast at the 2021 Adweek Podcast Awards. The second season chronicled the tumultuous production of The Bonfire of the Vanities (1990), the third profiled Lucille Ball, and the fourth season profiled Pam Grier.

On June 6, 2024, the fifth season of The Plot Thickens, which chronicled film director John Ford's life and career, began streaming. A sixth season chronicling the troubled production of Joseph L. Mankiewicz's Cleopatra (1963) began streaming in July 2025. A seventh season about Stanley Kubrick, in partnership with the Criterion Collection, will begin streaming on September 24, 2026.

In 2023, Mankiewicz began hosting a second podcast series Talking Pictures, in which he interviewed several personalities, including Mel Brooks, Nancy Meyers, and Patty Jenkins. A second season has been renewed, which began streaming in November 2024. It features interviews with Bill Murray, Margot Robbie, Carol Burnett, and Henry Winkler among others.

=== Other ventures ===
In 2008, Mankiewicz was hired to co-host the nationally syndicated television series At the Movies, alongside Ben Lyons. While Lyons's credentials as a film critic were criticized, Mankiewicz received a favorable reception among television viewers. Regardless, this incarnation was cancelled after one season, and they were replaced by A. O. Scott and Michael Phillips. In response, Mankiewicz stated: "I loved working on this show, every moment of it ... It was an honor to continue a broadcast legacy not merely started by Roger Ebert and Gene Siskel, but created by them. No doubt the show is in good hands."

Mankiewicz co-hosted the online film review series What the Flick?! on The Young Turks Network, alongside fellow critics Christy Lemire, Matt Atchity, and Alonso Duralde. In August 2018, Lemire posted on her website What the Flick?! had officially ended. The series was reformatted into the web series and podcast Breakfast All Day hosted by Lemire and Duralde.

Mankiewicz has made cameo appearances in the Lifetime television movie The Bling Ring (2011) and the action film White House Down (2013). He also appears regularly on other shows as a political and media commentator, including The Michael Brooks Show in 2017. In 2019, he became a news contributor for CBS News Sunday Morning. He was among the people interviewed for the documentary film Memory: The Origins of Alien (2019).

== Personal life ==
Mankiewicz married his second wife, Lee Russo, aboard the Disney Magic during the 2013 TCM Classic Cruise. They live in Santa Monica, California with their daughter. In December 2025, his daughter was the first featured guest of the TCM block "Kid Fans", where she picked the 1945 film Christmas in Connecticut.

== Filmography ==
=== Film ===
Year	Title	Role	Notes
2011	The Bling Ring	Host	TV movie
2012	Ten Years of the Young Turks	Himself	
2013	White House Down	Reporter	
2013	The Screenwriters: The Stars Behind the Camera	Himself	
2014	TCM: Twenty Classic Moments	Host	TV movie
2014	Mad as Hell	Himself	
2014	I Am Steve McQueen	Film critic	
2014	Hannibal: This Is My Design	Himself	
2015	Robert Osborne's 20th Anniversary Tribute	Himself	
2017	Faye Dunaway: Live from the TCM Classic Film Festival	Host	
2018	Michael Douglas: Live from the TCM Classic Film Festival	Host	
2018	The Great Buster	Himself	
2018	The Producers: Q&A with Mel Brooks from the TCM Classic Film Festival	Moderator/Interviewer	
2019	Memory: The Origins of Alien	Host, Turner Classic Movies	
2020	Mank	Broadcaster, Academy Awards	Voice role
2020	Stuntwoman: The Untold Hollywood Story	Himself	
2021	I Am Alfred Hitchcock	Himself	Voice role
2021	Film, the Living Record of our Memory	Himself	
2022	Tis the Season: The Holidays on Screen	Commentator	TV special
2023	Dick Tracy Special: Tracy Zooms In	Himself	TV movie
2023	Remembering Gene Wilder	Himself	
2023	AFL Life Achievement Award: 50th Anniversary Special	Host	TV special

=== Television ===
Year	Title	Role	Notes
2003	The Practice	News Anchor	Episode: "Les Is More"
2003	Summer Under the Stars	Host	
2004	Cartoon Alley	Host	
2006–2020	The Young Turks	Host/Himself/Guest	18 episodes
2007–2008	TMZ on TV	Himself	3 episodes
2007	Big Love	News presenter	Episode: "Good Guys and Bad Guys"
2008–2009	At the Movies	Co-Host	25 episodes
2009	Who Wants to Be a Millionaire	Guest Expert	3 episodes
2009	The Bonnie Hunt Show	Himself	1 episode
2010–2015	TYT Sports	Host/Anchor	21 episodes
2010–2017	What the Flick?!	Host	154 episodes
2010	Party Down	Sportscaster	Episode: "Cole Landry's Draft Day Party"
2010	The Rotten Tomatoes Show	Himself	4 episodes
2011; 2014	The Point	Himself	2 episodes
AM Northwest	Himself	Episode: "Ernest Borgnine"	
Hot Set	Host	Episode: "Alien Queen"	
SAG Foundation Conversations	Host	Episode: "Illeana Douglas"	
2013	The War Room with Michael Shure	Guest	1 episode
2014–2019	Jeopardy!	Clue Giver/Video Clue Presenter	4 episodes
2015	Mad as Hell: The Series	Himself	4 episodes
2015	AFI Life Achievement Award	Himself	Episode: "AFI Life Achievement Award: A Tribute to Steve Martin"
2016–2024	TCM Guest Programmer	42 episodes	
2016	The Cowboy	Himself	2 episodes
2017	TCM Spotlight: 50 Years of Hitchcock	Host	10 episodes
2017	TCM Co-Host	Himself	Episode: "George Pal Tribute"
2017	The Michael Brooks Show	Himself	1 episode
2018	Good Day L.A.	Himself	1 episode
2019–2020	The Very Very Best of the 70s	Himself/Commentator	2 episodes
2019–present	CBS News Sunday Morning	Himself/CBS News Correspondent	40 episodes
2019	Private Screenings	Host	Episode: "The Best of Private Screenings"
2019	TCM Presents: Never Surrender - WWII in the Movies	Host	27 episodes
2019	TCM Presents: Out of This World	Host	3 episodes
2019	The Movies	Himself	6 episodes
2019	TCM Spotlight: Gridiron Glory - College Football in the Movies	Host	13 episodes
2019	TCM Spotlight: Pets on Sets	Host	12 episodes
2020	The Simpsons	Himself	Episode: "Treehouse of Horror XXXI"
2020	Now Showing	Host	48 episodes
2020	AFI Movie Club	Himself	Episode: "Ben Mankiewicz announces Ben Hur"
2020	The Essentials	Host	20 episodes
2021	Cartoon Network's Cartoonito	Himself	
2023-2024	AEW Dynamite	Presenter	2 episodes
2024	John Mulaney Presents: Everybody's in LA	Caller	Episode: "Earthquakes"
2024	ASSSSCAT: Los Angeles	Monologist	Episode: "Ben Mankiewicz"
2024	AEW Collision	Himself	Episode: "Countdown to AEW All In 2024"
2024	Sugar	Himself	Episode: "Starry-Eyed"
2025	Today	Himself	1 episode

=== Audio ===
Year	Title	Role	Notes
2020–present	The Plot Thickens	Host	47 episodes
2020	Give Them Lala	Guest	Episode: "and Ben Mankiewicz"
2020	Well, This Isn't Normal	Himself	Episode: "Ben Mankiewicz Has a Voice for Storytelling"
2021	Gilbert Gottfried's Amazing Colossal Podcast	Guest	Episode: "Ben Mankiewicz"
2022	The Big Lie	Narrator	
2024–present	Talking Pictures: A Movie Memories Podcast	Host	30 episodes
2024	Julian Schlossberg's Movie Talk	Guest	2 episodes
2024	The Movies That Made Me	Guest	Episode: "TALKING PICTURES podcast Host Ben Mankiewicz"
2025	The Big Fix: A Jack Bergin Mystery	Narrator	8 episodes
