= Josh Mankiewicz =

American journalist (born 1955)

Joshua Mankiewicz
- Born: Joshua Paul Mankiewicz; August 27, 1955 (age 70); Berkeley, California, U.S.
- Education: Haverford College
- Occupation: NBC News correspondent
- Spouse: Anh Tu Dang (m. 2016)
- Father: Frank Mankiewicz
- Family: Mankiewicz

Joshua Paul "Josh" Mankiewicz (born August 27, 1955) is an American journalist, who has been reporting for Dateline NBC since 1995. He has reported for The Today Show and NBC Nightly News with Brian Williams, and Sunday Night with Megyn Kelly. Before moving to NBC, Mankiewicz worked as a producer and reporter for ABC News.

Although he has covered a wide variety of stories, he may be best known for his Dateline NBC report on the Atkins Diet. In the piece, he showed his personal progress on the diet, losing upwards of 47 pounds (21 kilograms). In 2006, in addition to his work as a correspondent, he was featured in "The Mank Blog", an irreverent look at what people are talking about online.

== Personal life ==
Mankiewicz is the son of Holly (née Jolley; 1925–2019) and Frank Mankiewicz (1924-2014). Mankiewicz's father was Robert F. Kennedy's press secretary. His father was Jewish and his mother was raised Mormon but left the church. She worked with the Los Angeles chapter of the NAACP. He is the grandson of famed screenwriter Herman Mankiewicz and grand-nephew of screenwriter, producer and director Joseph L. Mankiewicz. He is the older brother of radio personality and Turner Classic Movies prime-time host Ben Mankiewicz. He is a cousin of screenwriter Tom Mankiewicz and of filmmaker/television producer Nick Davis.

Mankiewicz is a 1977 graduate of Haverford College in Haverford, Pennsylvania, a suburb of Philadelphia.

Mankiewicz married Anh Tu Dang in 2016.
