= Rosetti and Ryan =

- Genre: Legal drama
- Created by: Richard P. Rosetti
- Country of origin: United States
- Original language: English
- No. of seasons: 1
- No. of episodes: 6 (and a pilot)

Production
- Running time: 60 minutes
- Production companies: Heyday Productions; Universal Television

Original release
- Network: NBC
- Release: May 19 – November 10, 1977

Rosetti and Ryan is an American legal drama television series that aired on NBC from September 22 until November 10, 1977, from 10 to 11 p.m. Eastern Time.

== Premise ==
Legal drama about two completely different lawyers; Rosetti is outgoing and debonair, while Ryan is a former cop who is more low-profile and no-nonsense.

== Cast ==
- Tony Roberts as Joe Rosetti
- Squire Fridell as Frank Ryan
- Jane Elliot as Jessica Hornesby
- Ruth Manning as Emma
- Randi Oakes as Georgia
- Dick O'Neill as Judge Hardcastle
- William Marshall as Judge Black

== Personnel ==
- Leonard B. Stern, executive producer
- Don M. Mankiewicz and Gordon Cotler, supervising producers
- Jerry Davis, producer for Universal Television
- Sam Rolfe, writer
- John Astin, Harry Falk, and Richard Crenna, directors

== Episodes ==
=== Pilot (1977) ===
Title	Directed by	Written by	Original release date
Men Who Love Women	John Astin	Gordon Cotler, Don Mankiewicz, & Sam Rolfe	May 19, 1977
Rosetti and Ryan defend an heiress accused of killing her husband.

=== Season 1 (1977) ===
No.	Title	Directed by	Written by	Original release date
1	"If You Can't Trust Your Lawyer"	Alex March	Unknown	September 22, 1977
An actress is accused of killing the publicist of a football player.
2	"The Ten-Second Client"	Burt Brinckerhoff	Don M. Mankiewicz & Gordon Cotler	October 13, 1977
A getaway driver of a hotel robbery is charged with technical murder.
3	"Is There a Lawyer in the House?"	Daniel Haller	Jeff King	October 20, 1977
A TV commercial director is charged with sexual assault and narcotics possession.
4	"Ms. Bluebeard"	Harry Falk	Unknown	October 27, 1977
A woman is suspected of killing her sixth husband.
5	"Everybody Into the Pool"	Richard Crenna	Unknown	November 3, 1977
Rosetti and Ryan act as standby lawyers for a murder defendant handling her own case.
6	"Bedeviled Angel"	Joshua Shelley	Walter Wager	November 10, 1977
A woman tries to use counterfeit bills to pay a traffic fine.

== Production ==
The pilot aired May 19, 1977, as a made-for-TV-movie.
