= Steven Hicks =

American businessman (born 1950)

Steve Hicks
- Born: 24 February 1950; Dallas, Texas, U.S.
- Died: 7 January 2026 (aged 75); Austin, Texas, U.S.
- Education: University of Texas at Austin
- Occupation: Businessman
- Children: 3
- Relatives: Tom Hicks (brother)

Robert Steven Hicks (February 24, 1950 - January 7, 2026) was an American businessman, who is most closely associated with the radio business, pioneering the concept of local marketing agreement and was the Vice-Chairman of AMFM, Inc, a predecessor of radio station company Clear Channel Communications. He is chairman of medial medical products firm HealthTronics and chairman of private investment firm Capstar Partners LLC, of which he is the principal owner. He is on the University of Texas System board of regents.

== Early life and education ==
The son of a Texas radio station owner John Hicks, Hicks was born in Dallas, Texas, the younger brother of future billionaire Tom Hicks. He graduated from Forest Park High School in Beaumont, Texas in 1968. Hicks attended the University of Texas at Austin. He became a brother of Sigma Phi Epsilon, and graduated in 1972 with a Bachelor's degree in Government. While at the University of Texas, he was also a member of the Silver Spurs which is the honorary service organization responsible for the caretaking of the Longhorn Mascot BEVO. Hicks, along with his brother, was inducted into The Silver Spur Alumni Hall of Fame.

== Career ==
Hicks bought his first radio station at the age of twenty-nine. He was the CEO of GulfStar Communications, Inc., from July 1987 to January 1997. Over the next 14 years, he acquired stations in Texas, Oklahoma, Louisiana, Tennessee, Mississippi, and South Carolina. He also co-founded and was CEO of SFX Broadcasting, Inc. from November 1993 to May 1996, including the initial public offering of the stock in 1993. In 1997, Hicks was named the Radio Executive of the Year and was ranked one of the 10 Most Powerful People in Radio by Radio Ink. In 1996, Ernst & Young named him Entrepreneur of the Year and recognized as Broadcaster of the Year by the Texas Association of Broadcasters.

Later, he founded and was chief executive officer of Capstar Broadcasting Corporation, which he also took public on the New York Stock Exchange in 1998. In 1999, Capstar Broadcasting merged with Chancellor Media Corp to form AMFM Inc. Hicks was vice-chairman and chief executive officer of the new media division of AMFM. In 2000, AMFM was bought by radio station behemoth Clear Channel Communications. In December 2002, Hicks was appointed to the board of directors of XM. On February 2, 2005, Hicks was appointed to the board of directors of sound equipment maker SLS International, Inc., a publicly traded company(the firm filed chapter 11 in 2009).

In February 2009, Texas Governor Rick Perry appointed Hicks to a term on The University of Texas System Board of Regents. He was confirmed by the Texas State Senate on April 1, 2009, took office the following day and his term expires February 1, 2011. He was on the Facilities Planning and Construction Committee as well as the Student, Faculty, and Staff Campus Life Committee.

== Personal life ==
In 1997, Hicks was named the Radio Executive of the Year and was ranked one of the 10 Most Powerful People in Radio by Radio Ink. In 1996, Ernst & Young named him Entrepreneur of the Year and recognized as Broadcaster of the Year by the Texas Association of Broadcasters.
