= The Marshal =

American television series (1995)

- Created by: Daniel Pyne; John Mankiewicz
- Starring: Jeff Fahey; Patricia Harras; Brion James; Kristina Lewis; Carly McKillip
- Composer: Tim Truman
- Country of origin: United States
- Original language: English
- No. of seasons: 2
- No. of episodes: 25

Production
- Executive producers: Don Johnson; Aaron Lipstadt; John Mankiewicz; Daniel Pyne
- Running time: 60 minutes
- Production companies: Buffalo Wallet Productions; Western Sandblast; Paramount Television

Original release
- Network: ABC
- Release: January 31 – December 25, 1995

The Marshal is an American action-drama television series that aired on ABC for two seasons in 1995. The show starred Jeff Fahey as the title character, a United States Marshal charged with pursuing fugitives across the nation. In 1995, the episode "Hitwoman" was nominated for Outstanding Individual Achievement in Sound Editing for a Series at the 47th Primetime Emmy Awards.

== Plot ==
Winston MacBride (Jeff Fahey) is a family man and fugitive-chasing Deputy U.S. Marshal who has never let a criminal get away. By tracking and guarding criminals, he wanders all over the country, meeting different people along the way. The wisecracking MacBride relies largely on his quirky sense of humor and intellect to fulfill his duties.

== Production ==
=== Development ===
The idea for the program came when producer Carole Myers and a former law enforcement officer obtained a formal letter from the U.S. Marshals Service in Washington, D.C., and Myers presented the idea for a series based on the Marshals to Paramount Television, the TV arm of Paramount Pictures. After gaining Paramount's interest, Myers, who was formerly a special projects producer and publicist for Miami Vice, presented the project to Don Johnson, the former star of Miami Vice who had a production company based at Paramount.

Originally, the production was to be a reality series in the same vein that Cops was for police. After the Waco siege, however, the plan was dropped and the concept reworked into a dramatic series on Myers' recommendation. Johnson realized that no television series had specifically targeted the U.S. Marshals, the nation's oldest law enforcement agency, dating back more than 200 years. ABC, which had a somewhat long and successful relationship with Paramount since the late 1960s, picked up the series for its 1994–1995 schedule.

=== Casting ===
Johnson chose Jeff Fahey to play the lead character, Deputy U.S. Marshal Winston MacBride. Fahey had been a friend of Johnson's for years and guest-starred in the Miami Vice third season premiere "When Irish Eyes Are Crying". This casting was considered particularly crucial since MacBride would have no sidekick or other regular supporting characters to interact with. Not since The Fugitive had a crime drama focused so tightly on a single character. Guest stars were a regular part of the program's formula; the episode "Bounty Hunter", directed by Johnson, featured his former Miami Vice castmate John Diehl as a fugitive serial killer.

=== Filming ===
Due to the low shooting expense, The Marshal was filmed in Vancouver, British Columbia and Calgary, Alberta which would double as "Anytown, U.S.A."; due to the manhunt nature of the series, they would serve as a variety of cities. The show cost $1.5 million per episode which, rather than going to high salaries, went "directly onto the screen, making The Marshal look much more like a movie than a TV series".

== Episodes ==
=== Season 1 (1995) ===
No. overall	No. in season	Title	Directed by	Written by	Original release date
1	1	"Pilot"	Dean Parisot	Daniel Pyne & John Mankiewicz	January 31, 1995
2	2	"Grab the Money and Run!"	James Quinn	Nancy Miller	February 4, 1995
3	3	"The Great Train Robbery"	Dean Parisot	Les Carter & Susan Sisko	February 11, 1995
4	4	"The Ballad of Lucas Burke"	Tucker Gates	Erich Anderson	February 18, 1995
5	5	"Hitwoman"	Aaron Lipstadt	Debra Epstein & Jim Leonard	February 25, 1995
6	6	"Protection"	Tucker Gates	Terry Curtis Fox	March 4, 1995
7	7	"The Bounty Hunter"	Don Johnson	Don Mankiewicz	March 11, 1995
8	8	"Twoslip"	Deborah Reinisch	Alfonso H. Moreno	March 25, 1995
9	9	"Little Odessa"	Roy Campanella II	William Conway	April 1, 1995
10	10	"Snow Orchid"	Dean Parisot	Hans Tobeason	April 8, 1995
11	11	"Natural Law"	Roy Campanella II	Charles Duncan & Hans Tobeason	April 15, 1995
12	12	"Unprotected Witness"	Aaron Lipstadt	Terry Curtis Fox	April 17, 1995

=== Season 2 (1995) ===
No. overall	No. in season	Title	Directed by	Written by	Original release date
13	1	"Rainbow Comix"	Vern Gillum	Les Carter & Susan Sisko	September 11, 1995
14	2	"Buy Hard"	Dean Parisot	Daniel Pyne & John Mankiewicz	September 18, 1995
15	3	"The New Marshal"	Tucker Gates	Jim Leonard	September 25, 1995
16	4	"The Heartbreak Kid"	Tucker Gates	Erich Anderson	October 2, 1995
17	5	"Gone Fishing"	P.J. Pesce	Terry Curtis Fox	October 9, 1995
18	6	"Land of Opportunity"	Jonathan Sanger	Debra Epstein	October 16, 1995
19	7	"Pass the Gemelli"	Vern Gillum	Hans Tobeason	October 23, 1995
20	8	"The Show"	Tucker Gates	William Conway	November 6, 1995
21	9	"Love is Strange"	Jeff Reiner	Les Carter & Susan Sisko	November 13, 1995
22	10	"Kissing Cousins"	Jonathan Sanger	Erich Anderson	November 20, 1995
23	11	"'65-'95"	Deborah Reinisch	Thomas George Carter & Samantha Howard Corbin	December 4, 1995
24	12	"These Foolish Things"	William Richert	Story by : Samantha Howard Corbin; Teleplay by : Samantha Howard Corbin & Jackson Hunsicker	December 11, 1995
25	13	"Time Off for Clever Behavior"	Patrick Norris	Story by : Benjamin Stein & Don Mankiewicz; Teleplay by : Don Mankiewicz	December 25, 1995

== Broadcast ==
The Marshal debuted on Tuesday, January 31, 1995, as a mid-season replacement. It then aired regularly on Saturdays opposite CBS' Walker, Texas Ranger and performed well enough in the ratings to be the only new ABC show to be renewed for the fall.

For its second season, ABC gave The Marshal a critical slot on its schedule. Leading off the network's Monday night lineup at 8:00 p.m., the series was to serve as the lead-in program for Monday Night Football; ABC had previously enjoyed moderate success with MacGyver on Monday night, with the show running there for six years.

The Marshal was also entering a much more competitive hour; CBS and NBC at the time aired successful situation comedy blocks on Mondays while Fox countered with the popular drama Melrose Place. Despite ABC's efforts, the ratings never rose to a satisfactory level for the network and The Marshal was cancelled, with the series coming to an end on Christmas Night just before the final Monday night game of the football season. The abbreviated season aired in reruns during the following summer.

== Critical reception ==
Todd Everett gave a mediocre review of the series pilot and expected the series to "fade quickly from public consciousness". He also noted one humorous reference but described it as "fleeting" and expressed that the series could benefit from more of such humor. Everett added that "Fahey could turn into an appealing lead if given more opportunity to loosen up."

Having seen multiple episodes, Ken Trucker of Entertainment Weekly gave the series a B+ and encouraged TV viewers to watch it. He noted that despite the "perfectly suited" Fahey's handsome looks, MacBride's best quality is his "air of fallibility" which offers an eccentric spoofing of the macho, heroic archetype. Trucker summed by stating: "At once true to action-show rules and properly parodic about the role of good guys in the late 20th century, The Marshal is an underrated pleasure."

David Kronke of the Los Angeles Times titled his review, "'Marshal' Shows Promise With Smart, Arresting Wit".

When ABC canceled the show, Entertainment Weekly wrote in their Best and Worst 1995 article, "Best 'Melrose Place' Alternative The Marshal (ABC): On Mondays, this now-canceled Jeff Fahey actioner was funnier and more exciting than Melrose. All this and music by Van Dyke Parks, one of the year's more discreet pop secrets."
