= The Street (1988 TV series) =

American police drama TV series (1988)

- Created by: John Mankiewicz; Daniel Pyne
- Starring: Stanley Tucci; Michael Beach
- Country of origin: United States
- Original language: English

Production
- Running time: 30 minutes

Original release
- Network: Syndication
- Release: 1988 – 1988

The Street is an American police drama that aired in syndication five nights a week in 1988. A total of 65 thirty-minute episodes were produced.

== Synopsis ==
Filmed on location in Newark, New Jersey and other northern New Jersey cities, The Street was filmed mostly at night with handheld cameras which gave it a documentary look. The series followed two sets of patrolmen, Officers Bud Peluso and Arthur Scolari, who used patrol car 260 on the 3:00 pm to 11:00 pm shift, and Officers Jack Runyon and Sheppard Scott, who used the same car from 11:00 pm to 7:00 am. Stories centered on the officers lives on and off-duty.

The Street used frank language and had gritty, adult subject matter. As a result, the program had an on-screen warning and was run after 11:00 pm on most stations.

== Cast ==
- Bruce MacVittie as Officer Bud Peluso
- Stanley Tucci as Officer Arthur Scolari
- Ron J. Ryan as Officer Jack Runyon
- Michael Beach as Officer Sheppard Scott
