= Brooks Hansen =

American novelist

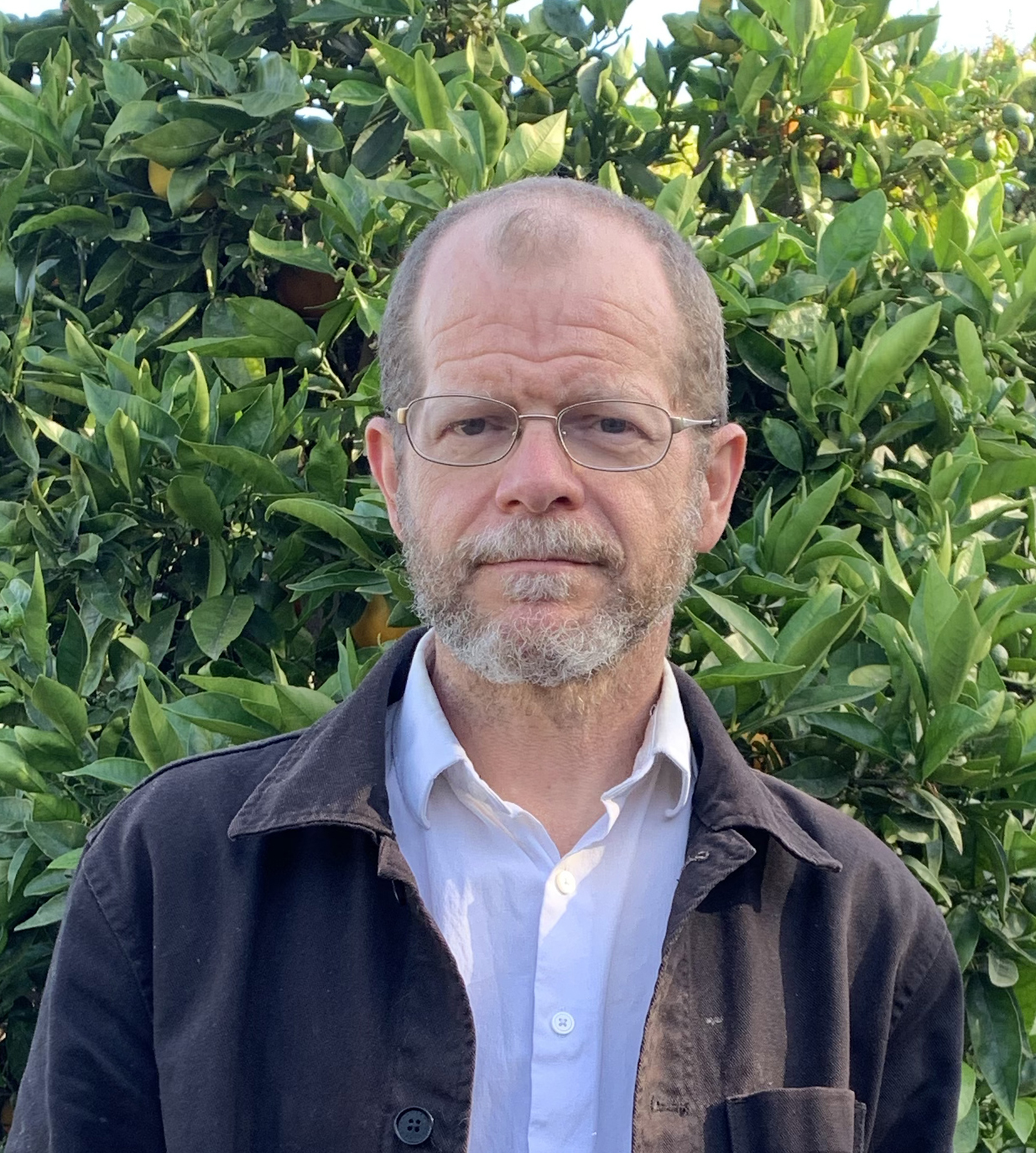
- Born: March 29, 1965 (age 61); New York City, U.S.
- Education: Harvard University
- Occupation: Novelist
- Writing career
- Period: 1990–present
- Genre: Literary fiction
- Website: brookshansen.com

Brooks Hansen (born March 29, 1965) is an American novelist, screenwriter, and illustrator best known for his 1995 book The Chess Garden. He was the recipient of the John Simon Guggenheim Fellowship in 2005. Since 2010, Hansen has lived and worked at the Cate School, where he teaches English and Humanities. He lives with his family in Carpinteria, California.

Hansen started his own imprint, Star Pine Books, in 2016.

== Writing career ==
Brooks Hansen was born in New York City on March 29, 1965. After graduating from Harvard University, he and Nick Davis, a childhood friend and classmate, co-wrote their first novel, Boone, a biographical account of the fictional Arthur Eton Boone. It was released in 1990 and named a New York Times Notable Book. His next major published work was 1995's The Chess Garden. It was critically acclaimed and named a New York Times Notable Book of the Year, a Publishers Weekly Best Book of the Year, and to the Fall 1995 Barnes & Noble "Discover Great New Writers" program.

His next work, a young adult novel called Caesar's Antlers, which he also illustrated, was criticized as being too erudite for its target audience, with Mark Oppenheimer in review for The New York Times writing that his prose was "too intricate for most adults to follow, let alone listening children". (Featuring a sparrow who nests in a reindeer's antlers, and recommended for ages 8–12 by the publisher, it was reviewed as a children's book, although not a read-aloud.) His 2003 novel The Monsters of St. Helena, a fictional account of Napoleon Bonaparte's final years on St. Helena, was again acclaimed, and named a New York Times Notable Book, as 1999's Perlman's Ordeal had been. He has since written numerous other works. His most recent title The Unknown Woman of the Seine (Delphinium Books) was among the New York Times top selections for historical fiction of 2021.

== Works ==
- Boone, by Hansen and Nick Davis (1990) – New York Times Notable Book
- The Chess Garden (1995) – New York Times Notable Book of the Year; Publishers Weekly Best Book of the Year; selected for the Fall 1995 Barnes & Noble "Discover Great New Writers" program
- Caesar's Antlers, self-illustrated (1997), for children
- Perlman's Ordeal: A Novel (1999) – New York Times Notable Book
- The Monsters of St. Helena (2003) – New York Times Notable Book
- The Brotherhood of Joseph (2008), a memoir
- John the Baptizer: A Novel (2009)
- Asmodeus: The Legend of Margrét and the Dragon (2016)
- "BEASTIE: Lord of The Lamp Post, a recollection with drawings" (2016)
- The Unknown Woman of the Seine (2021)
