= Peter Davis (director) =

Filmmaker, author, journalist (born 1937)

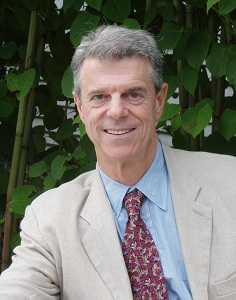
- Davis in 2003
- Born: Peter Frank Davis; January 2, 1937 (age 89); Santa Monica, California, U.S.
- Occupation: Filmmaker

Peter Frank Davis (born January 2, 1937) is an American filmmaker, author, novelist and journalist. His film Hearts and Minds, about American military action in Vietnam, won the Academy Award for Best Documentary Feature in 1974.

== Early life ==
Peter Frank Davis was born in Santa Monica, California. He grew up in Pacific Palisades, Los Angeles, and has a younger sister, Jane. His parents were the American Jewish screenwriters Frank Davis and Tess Slesinger, and after his mother's death in 1945, Isabelle Fair Wrangell became his stepmother. His mother was active in politics with the American Communist Party: a Stalinist, she signed a letter denouncing the Dewey Commission's investigation of the Moscow Trials.

Davis attended both public and private schools, graduating from Chadwick School in Palos Verdes, CA. He went on to Harvard University, where he graduated magna cum laude in 1957 with a A.B. in English literature.

== Career ==
After college, Davis worked briefly for The New York Times and served in the U.S. Army (1959-1960). From 1961 to 1964, he worked on FDR, a 26-part television series for which he interviewed President Roosevelt's family, friends, enemies, Cabinet members and political associates.

In 1965, Davis moved to CBS News as a writer and worked on documentaries about student rebellion, homosexuality, slavery, the Six Day War, racism and hunger in America. His 1971 film for CBS News, The Selling of the Pentagon, an investigation of U.S. Defense Department public relations, won the prestigious Peabody. Davis' Hearts and Minds, a film about American military action in Vietnam, won the Academy Award for Best Feature Documentary for the year 1974. His subsequent project, the Middletown series for PBS, received 10 Emmy nominations and two Emmys. Individual films from the series won the Blue Ribbon at the American Film Festival and the First Prize Feature Documentary at the Sundance Festival. JACK, a film he made with his son, the filmmaker Nick Davis, was nominated for two Emmys and won one in 1994.

Davis has written three nonfiction books: Hometown (1982), Where Is Nicaragua? (1987), and If You Came This Way (1995). His first novel Girl of My Dreams, about Hollywood in the 1930s, was released in 2015.

He has reported for The Nation magazine, for which he covered the U.S. War in Iraq. He has also written for Esquire, The New York Times Magazine, New York Woman, The Boston Globe, and The Los Angeles Times.

== Personal life ==
Davis has been married three times. His first wife was the late novelist Johanna Davis, daughter of Herman J. Mankiewicz, with whom he had two children, Tim Davis (1963) and Nick Davis (1965). His second wife is the entrepreneur Karen Zehring, with whom he had two children, Jesse Harper Zehring Davis (1980) and Antonia Isabelle Zehring Davis (1981). Davis and Zehring divorced in 1995. In 2003, Davis married the journalist Alicia Anstead, and he has one stepdaughter, Kristen Anstead. Davis has eight grandchildren. He lives in Castine, Maine.

== Films ==
- The Berkeley Rebels (writer, 1965)
- Hunger in America (writer, 1968)
- The Heritage of Slavery (writer/producer, 1968)
- The Battle of East St. Louis (writer/producer, 1969)
- The Selling of the Pentagon (writer/producer, 1971)
- Hearts and Minds (director/co-producer, 1974)
- Middletown Series (creator/producer, 1982)
  - The Campaign
  - The Big Game
  - Community of Praise
  - Family Business
  - Second Time Around
  - Seventeen
- The Best Hotel on Skid Row (producer, 1990)
- JACK (co-writer/executive producer, 1993)

== Books ==
- Hometown (1982)
- Where Is Nicaragua? (1987)
- If You Came This Way (1995)
- Girl of My Dreams (2015)
