= Hot Set =

- Genre: Reality
- Presented by: Ben Mankiewicz
- Judges: Curt Beech; Lilly Kilvert; Barry Robison
- Country of origin: United States
- Original language: English
- No. of seasons: 1
- No. of episodes: 6

Production
- Executive producers: Aliyah Silverstein; Dwight Smith; Michael Agbabian
- Production locations: Los Angeles, California
- Production company: Mission Control Media

Original release
- Network: Syfy
- Release: September 18 – October 23, 2012

Hot Set is an American reality television game show on the Syfy cable network in which a group of production artists compete against each other to create movie sets. Ben Mankiewicz serves as the show's host, with judges being Curt Beech, Lilly Kilvert, and Barry Robison.

Each week, the artists must build a "hot set" that tests their artistry and techniques to create a fully functioning film set to match a theme over the course of 3 days, using a budget of $15,000. The first two days allows for concept design and building, a third day of filming and judging. The judges then have the opportunity to look at the sets from afar and up close. One artist will be deemed the winner, receiving a cash reward of $10,000.

== Episodes ==
No.	Title	Original release date
1	"Crash Landed Astronaut"	September 18, 2012
The designers try to build a movie set for an astronaut who has crash-landed on an alien planet.
2	"Alien Queen"	September 25, 2012
The designers try to build a film-ready throne room for a brutal alien queen.
3	"Android Bordello"	October 2, 2012
The designers and their teams must design and build a set for three futuristic android dancers. Production designer contestants: Kim A. Tolman, Carl Dove
4	"Down the Rabbit Hole"	October 9, 2012
The designers must create a set inspired by Alice's Adventures in Wonderland; the set must have the illusion that Alice is oversized, shrunken, or both as she navigates through at least two rooms in a dream state.
5	"Basement of Horrors"	October 16, 2012
The designers must create a serial killer's secret lair.
6	"Super Villain's Lair"	October 23, 2012
The designers must build a film-ready super villain's lair where a secret agent is trapped in a death machine.
