= Frank Mankiewicz =

American journalist and political adviser (1924–2014)

- Born: Frank Fabian Mankiewicz II; May 16, 1924; New York City, U.S.
- Died: October 23, 2014 (aged 90); Washington, D.C., U.S.
- Education: University of California, Los Angeles (BA); Columbia University (MA); University of California, Berkeley (LLB)
- Occupations: Journalist; Political advisor President of National Public Radio; Public relations executive
- Years active: 1972–1984
- Political party: Democratic
- Spouses: Holly Jolley Reynolds (m. 1952, divorced); Patricia O'Brien (m. 1988)
- Children: Josh; Ben
- Relatives: Herman J. Mankiewicz (father)
- Family: Mankiewicz

Frank Fabian Mankiewicz II (May 16, 1924 – October 23, 2014) was an American journalist, political adviser, president of National Public Radio, and public relations executive at Hill & Knowlton.

== Life and career ==
Frank Mankiewicz was born in New York City and grew up in Beverly Hills, California, the son of Sara (Aaronson) and screenwriter Herman J. Mankiewicz, who co-wrote Citizen Kane. His uncle, Joseph L. Mankiewicz, directed such films as All About Eve and Cleopatra. His brother was television writer Don Mankiewicz. They grew up near the Marx Brothers, and Harpo Marx was a presence at Mankiewicz family Passover Seders. "He would pick up the Paschal lamb bone and lead a parade around the table," Frank Mankiewicz recalled.

After graduating from Beverly Hills High School, he briefly attended Haverford College before dropping out to join the army infantry during World War II. He fought in the Battle of the Bulge.

After the war, Mankiewicz received a bachelor's degree in political science from University of California, Los Angeles in 1947; a master's degree from the Columbia University Graduate School of Journalism in 1948; and an LL.B. from University of California, Berkeley in 1955. He was president of National Public Radio from 1977 to 1983, overseeing the creation of Morning Edition and the expansion of the network. He resigned due to a $6 million debt that required NPR to be bailed out by the Corporation for Public Broadcasting and member stations. He had also served as regional director for the Peace Corps in Latin America, presidential campaign press secretary in 1968 to U.S. Senator Robert F. Kennedy, and campaign director for 1972 Democratic presidential nominee George McGovern.

Mankiewicz is a recurring figure in Hunter S. Thompson's Fear and Loathing on the Campaign Trail '72. Thompson described Mankiewicz more positively than many other political operatives, though Mankiewicz was outraged by Thompson's characterization of him as a "rumpled little man who looked like a used-car salesman."

=== RFK assassination ===
On June 5, 1968, at the Ambassador Hotel in Los Angeles, California, presidential candidate Robert F. Kennedy, having won the California primary election during his 1968 campaign for the U.S. presidency and given his victory speech, was gunned down just after midnight in the kitchen area as he was heading for a press conference. The Senator was taken first to Central Receiving Hospital, then Good Samaritan Hospital. Once Kennedy was admitted to GSH, news correspondents set up temporary press headquarters in a nearby gymnasium.

Throughout the day, Mankiewicz provided medical bulletins to the news media as received. One of his first reports came after 7 a.m., approximately four hours after surgery was completed to remove fragments of the bullet from Kennedy's brain; Mankiewicz reported that his vital signs were impaired but the senator was breathing on his own. However, by 1:30 p.m., Kennedy's condition had been downgraded from "critical" to "extremely critical". Several hours later, Mankiewicz returned to the news media headquarters with this report:

The team of physicians attending Senator Robert Kennedy is concerned over his continuing failure to show improvement during the post-operative period. Senator Kennedy's condition is still described as extremely critical. There will be no further regular bulletins until early tomorrow morning.

At 1:59 a.m. the next morning, a physically and emotionally exhausted Mankiewicz appeared before the news media and, remaining composed, relayed what turned out to be the final report:

I have, uh, a short—I have a short announcement to read, which I will read, uh—at this time. Senator Robert Francis Kennedy died at 1:44 a.m. today, June 6, 1968. With Senator Kennedy at the time of his death were his wife Ethel, his sisters Mrs. Stephen Smith, Mrs. Patricia Lawford, his brother-in-law Mr. Stephen Smith, and his sister-in-law Mrs. John F. Kennedy. He was 42 years old. Thank you.

=== Later years ===
His work in politics earned him a place on the master list of Nixon's political opponents. He was also an unsuccessful candidate for the U.S. House of Representatives in Maryland's 8th congressional district in 1976.

In 1974, Mankiewicz acted as a secret emissary, carrying messages from Secretary of State Henry Kissinger to Fidel Castro, and then reporting back to Kissinger. In January 1975, Mankiewicz and Lawrence Eagleburger held a clandestine meeting with Castro's representative Ramón Sánchez-Parodi at LaGuardia airport. This secret diplomacy failed to produce a political breakthrough.

In 1984, Frank Mankiewicz wrote for Quarante magazine owned by Kathleen Katz of Arlington. A piece he wrote for Quarante in 1985 was one of the first to point out how television coverage of politics had changed. The article was titled, "Politics and Media: In Search of An Angle". He wrote:

As part-time advisor to Senator Gary Hart's presidential campaign in 1984—the first I had participated in actively since 1972—I was struck by the minutiae of the press's questions. The authorship of a speech—the identity of the speechwriters—seemed far more important than its content. Strategy was a primary concern—which votes are being sought? How much money has been raised for television commercials? Who will produce the commercials? ... Rarely if ever does the question turn on such things as "does he have the right ideas?" or "would he make a strong—or even good—president?"

Mankiewicz joined the public relations firm Hill & Knowlton in 1983. From 1988 to 1990, the firm advised the Bank of Credit and Commerce International (BCCI) on its public relations strategy. A former government official later testified before a Senate Subcommittee that Mankiewicz was instrumental in throttling US government investigations into the bank, a claim that Mankiewicz denied. Another of the firm's overseas clients was the Turkish government. While Hill & Knowlton's vice chairman in 1988, Mankiewicz joined the Turkish ambassador to the United States to complain about PBS's airing of Theodore Bogossian's film about the Armenian genocide, An Armenian Journey. After the Iraqi invasion of Kuwait, Hill & Knowlton was hired by the Kuwaiti government to make the case for an American military intervention against Iraq, which at the time was described as "the largest foreign-funded campaign ever aimed at manipulating American public opinion". Mankiewicz described it as a "twenty-four-hour-a-day, seven-day-a-week undertaking". As part of this campaign, the firm arranged for the Nayirah testimony in October 1990, in which a 15-year-old Kuwaiti girl told the Congressional Human Rights Caucus that she had witnessed Iraqi soldiers taking babies from incubators and leaving them to die on the floor of a Kuwaiti maternity ward. Over a year later, the testimony caused a scandal when historian John R. MacArthur discovered that the girl was the daughter of the Kuwaiti ambassador to the United States, which had not been previously disclosed. MacArthur also found that the congressmen who had arranged the hearing, Tom Lantos and John Porter, operated a foundation almost rent-free out of Hill & Knowlton's Washington headquarters and that Mankiewicz was named to this foundation's board in October 1991. Mankiewicz denied that Hill & Knowlton had purposely deceived the public with Nayirah's testimony, for which he was criticized by journalist Andrew Cockburn.

In 1991, Mankiewicz announced that Hill & Knowlton would be dropping the Church of Scientology as a client because they also represented Prozac manufacturer Eli Lilly, whose product the Scientologists opposed as part of their beliefs against psychiatry.

Mankiewicz lived in Washington, D.C., with his second wife, novelist Patricia O'Brien, who also writes under the pseudonym of Kate Alcott. His son Josh Mankiewicz is an NBC News correspondent, while his son Ben Mankiewicz is a Turner Classic Movies host and a host on The Young Turks, who also served from September 2008 to September 2009 as co-host (with Ben Lyons) of At the Movies. Both Josh and Ben Mankiewicz live in Los Angeles.

=== Anti-metrication ===
According to Mankiewicz, he prompted Lyn Nofziger's efforts to halt the 1970s U.S. metrication effort, who convinced President Ronald Reagan to shut down the United States Metric Board.

=== Books ===
In 2016, Mankiewicz's memoir was published So as I Was Saying ... My Somewhat Eventful Life, with coauthor Joel Swerdlow (Thomas Dunne Books).

== Personal life ==
Mankiewicz was married to the former Holly Jolley and is the father of journalist and Turner Classic Movies host Ben Mankiewicz.

== Electoral history ==
U.S. House Democratic primary election (Maryland's 8th district, 1976)
Party	Candidate	Votes	%
Democratic	Lanny Davis	24,429	26.72%
Democratic	Frank Mankiewicz	19,897	21.76%
Democratic	Idamae Garrott	16,690	18.26%
Democratic	Charles A. Doctor	14,247	15.58%
Democratic	Lucille Maurer	11,677	12.77%
Democratic	John H. MacArthur	1,481	1.62%
Democratic	John J. Seiden	870	0.95%
Democratic	Robert Fustero	786	0.86%
Democratic	George W. Benns	531	0.58%
Democratic	Robert J. Roosevelt	440	0.48%
Democratic	David Dunnell	379	0.41%
Total votes		91,427	100.00%

== Death ==
Mankiewicz died in Washington, D.C., on October 23, 2014, at the age of 90. His son, Ben, stated that he died of internal bleeding, while son Josh, an NBC News correspondent, and family spokesman Adam Clymer, a former New York Times reporter, both said the reason for his hospitalization had been heart and lung problems, and that he had died of heart failure.
