= Joseph Benjamin Stenbuck =

- Born: December 22, 1891; New York City
- Died: June 1, 1951 (aged 59); New York City
- Education: Mount Sinai Hospital (1921)
- Occupation: Surgeon
- Employer(s): Harlem Hospital; New York City Fire Department (1939)
- Spouse: Erna Mankiewicz (1901-1979)
- Relatives: Joseph L. Mankiewicz, brotherinlaw

Joseph Benjamin Stenbuck (December 22, 1891 – June 1, 1951) was a leading Manhattan surgeon at Sydenham and Harlem Hospital.

== Biography ==
He was born on December 22, 1891, in New York City.

He married Erna Mankiewicz (1901–1979), she was the sister of Joseph L. Mankiewicz and Herman Mankiewicz.

He was accused of working for Soviet intelligence and acting as a dead drop and receiver of stolen blueprints for Robert Osman in 1933. That same year he was working in Harlem Hospital. In 1934 he was president of the Mount Sinai Hospital alumni executive board. In 1939 he was made a medical officer (battalion chief) earning $5,000 a year in the New York City Fire Department.

He died on June 1, 1951.

== Publications ==
- Stenbuck, Joseph. "Traction in a Thomas Splint" (PDF). The Journal of Bone and Joint Surgery.
- Stenbuck, Joseph (1933). "Plaster of Paris Buttress" (PDF). The Journal of Bone and Joint Surgery.
