= On Thin Ice (comedy group) =

Improvisational comedy group at Harvard University, U.S.

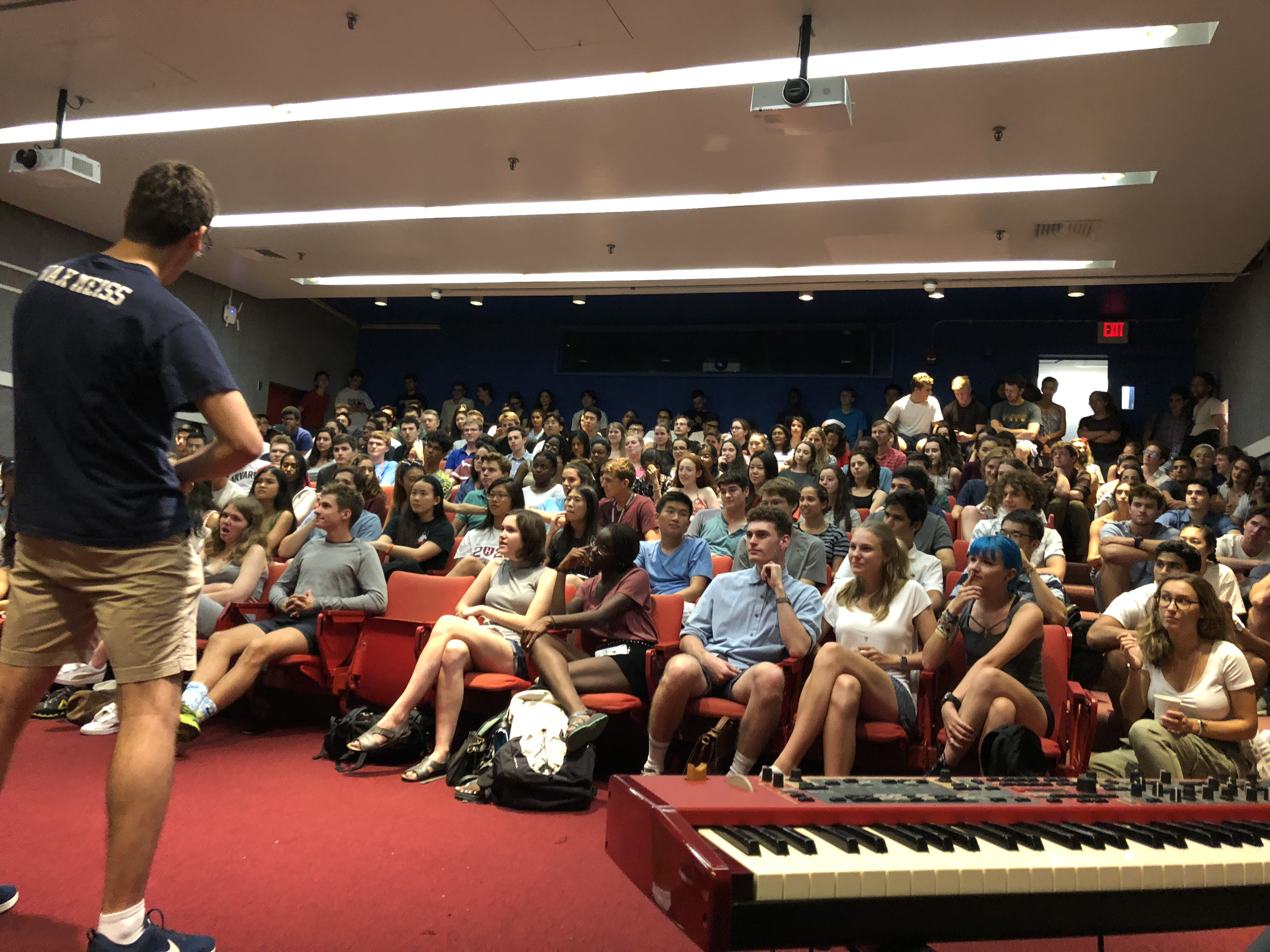
On Thin Ice performing an improv game at one of their shows.

On Thin Ice (OTI) is Harvard College's oldest improvisational comedy group. OTI specializes in short-form improvisational theater taking the form of various comedy games in the style of Whose Line Is It Anyway?.

== History ==
Founded in 1984 by Brigit Fasolino Vucic, On Thin Ice is Harvard's oldest improv troupe. Shows performed once every few weeks, are about 45 minutes long and depend on audience suggestions. OTI's constitution requires that they perform free on-campus shows. OTI is famous for their Trial By Fire show, a showcase for their newest members. Performed once each semester, the Trial By Fire show requires all new members, having only had one practice, to perform in every game. Additionally, they have competed in a number of short-form improv comedy competitions across the country and travel locally and nationally performing for numerous events and organizations. And every year, during the Harvard-Yale football game weekend, OTI performs with an improv troupe from Yale.

== Notable alumni ==
A number of notable individuals in the entertainment business have been past members of On Thin Ice. Among the early members were actor Christopher Liam Moore, Producer-Writer Nick Davis, screenwriter Adam Barr, and TV executive Susanne Lieberstein Daniels, as well as Eric Ronis, Christian Bordal (formerly Christian Kanuth), Ashby Semple, Eric Oleson, Kristen Gasser and Betty Achinstein. Other members in the 1980s included Writer-Producer Daniel Zelman, novelist Arthur Phillips, journalist-actress Faith Salie, and associate justice of the Supreme Court Ketanji Brown Jackson. 90's alumni include Brooklyn Nine-Nine Creator Dan Goor and Writer-Producer Charlie Grandy. Mike Roiff produced the 2007 film Waitress (film). More recent alumni include Colbert Report writer Rob Dubbin and actor-comedian Sabrina Wu.

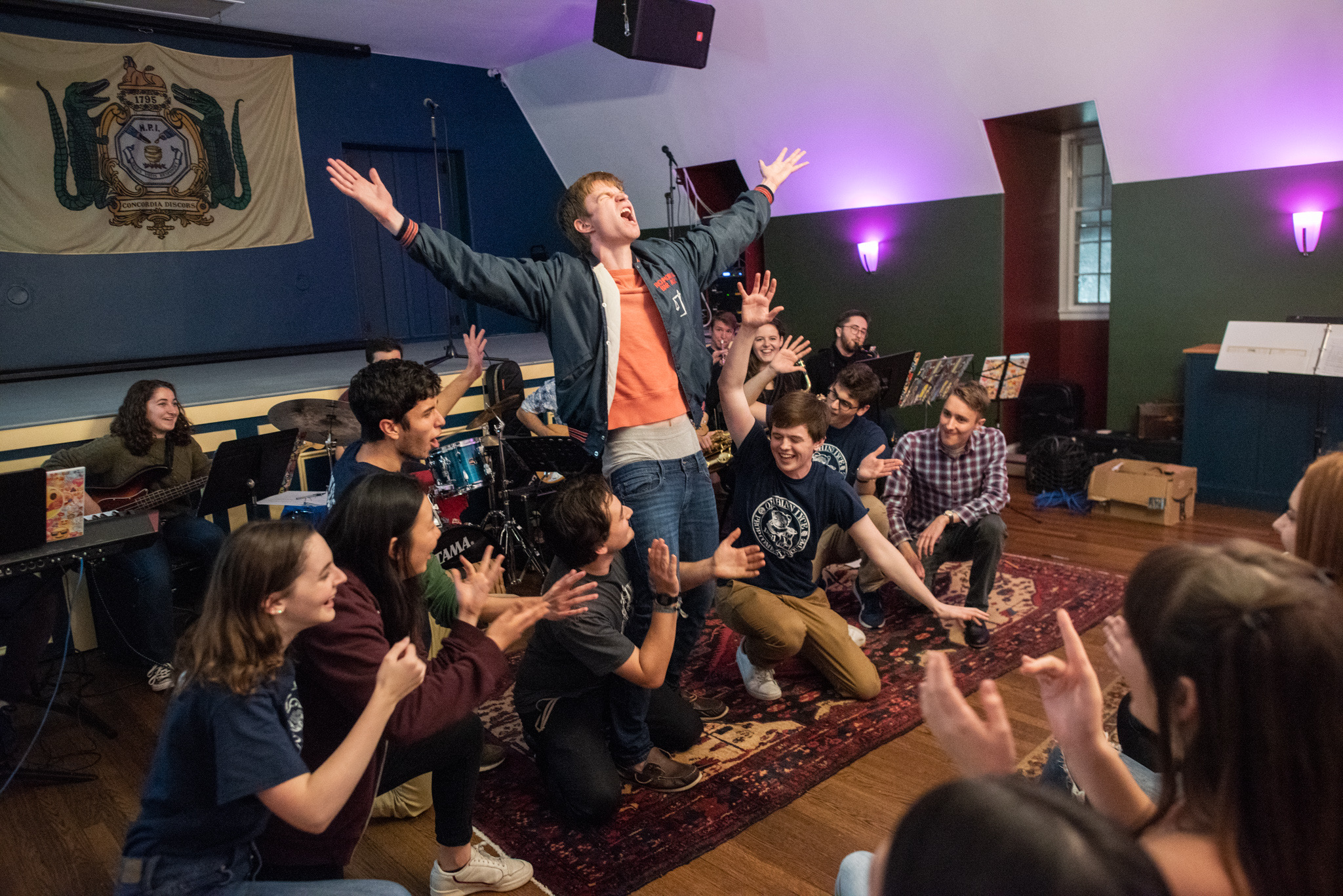
On Thin Ice sings the final note of a musical improv scene at the Hasty Pudding's annual Fall Show.

== See also ==
- Improvisational theatre
- List of improvisational theatre companies
