= Mankiewicz family =

American family of German-Jewish descent

The Mankiewicz family is an American family of German-Jewish descent, with members including:

- Herman J. Mankiewicz (1897–1953), Hollywood screenwriter (one Oscar; brother of Joseph)
  - Don Mankiewicz (1922–2015), screenwriter (son of Herman)
    - John Mankiewicz (born 1954), screenwriter and producer (son of Don)
    - Jane Mankiewicz, fiction writer published in The New Yorker (daughter of Don)
  - Frank Mankiewicz (1924–2014), journalist, publicist, politician (son of Herman)
    - Josh Mankiewicz (born 1955), television journalist (son of Frank, brother of Ben)
    - Ben Mankiewicz (born 1967), co-host of The Young Turks, currently the primary host on Turner Classic Movies (TCM; son of Frank, brother of Josh)
  - Johanna Mankiewicz Davis (1937–1974), novelist (daughter of Herman)
    - Nick Davis (born 1965), screenwriter, director and producer (son of Johanna)
    - Tim Davis (born 1963), television writer (son of Johanna)
- Joseph L. Mankiewicz (1909–1993), Hollywood screenwriter (2 Oscars), director (2 Oscars) and producer (brother of Herman)
  - Eric Reynal (né Mankiewicz, 1936–2022), bank executive (son of Joseph)
  - Christopher Mankiewicz (1940–2024), actor and producer (son of Joseph)
  - Tom Mankiewicz (1942–2010), screenwriter, director and producer (son of Joseph)
  - Alex Mankiewicz (born 1966), illustrator and artist (daughter of Joseph)
- Francis Mankiewicz (1944–1993), Canadian filmmaker, second cousin once removed to Herman J. Mankiewicz and Joseph L. Mankiewicz
