= Nick Davis (television and movie producer) =

American writer, director, producer

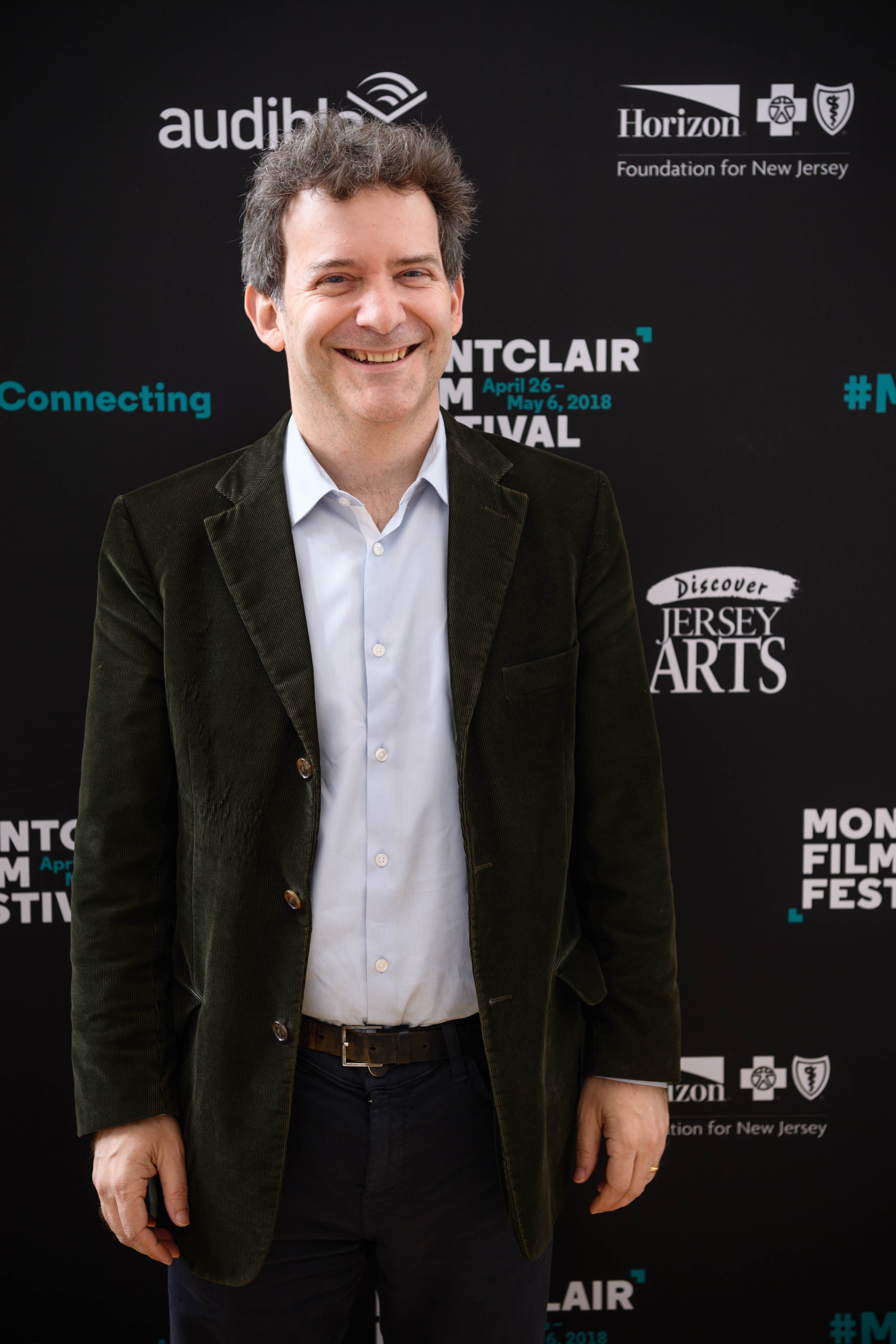
- Davis in 2018
- Born: United States
- Education: Harvard University
- Occupations: Film director, screenwriter, film producer
- Family: Mankiewicz (maternal)

Nick Davis is an American writer, director, and producer, founder of the company Nick Davis Productions.

== Early life and education ==
Nick Davis is the son of film director Peter Davis and the late Johanna Mankiewicz Davis. His paternal grandparents were the novelist and screenwriter Tess Slesinger and the screenwriter Frank Davis, and he is part of the Mankiewicz family on his mother's side. His mother's father was Herman Mankiewicz.

He graduated from Harvard University, where he was one of the founding members of the improv comedy group On Thin Ice.

== Career ==
Soon after graduating, Davis co-wrote the novel Boone with his friend Brooks Hansen. Published by Summit Books, The New York Times named it one of the most notable books of the year, saying, "Boone is written with energy and warmth, and it's clear that the authors have brought a lot of formal daring and inventiveness to the plodding old conventional novel.". Davis continued to perform improvisational comedy and acting before moving to behind-the camera roles.

Early in his career, Davis co-produced The Language of Life with Bill Moyers for PBS and produced Money and Power: The History of Business for CNBC. Davis also directed the Emmy Award-winning Jack: The Last Kennedy Film in 1993, which was produced with his father. The Los Angeles Times called it "a deeply impressionistic and impressively cinematic portrait....an ironic and irreverent sense of Kennedy’s superstardom, as well as how images made the man."

In 1998 he wrote and directed 1999, an independent feature film starring Jennifer Garner, Dan Futterman, and Amanda Peet, which aired on the Sundance Channel.

In 2001, he founded Nick Davis Productions. Production highlights include a Bravo Profile of actor Gene Wilder, A&E's New York at the Movies, hosted by Meryl Streep, and the Hugo Award-winning series, Stories of the Innocence Project, which explored the role of DNA testing in exonerating the wrongfully imprisoned.

In 2007, Davis wrote an episode of the ESPN Miniseries The Bronx is Burning.

Davis followed that up with a non-fiction television series Making News: Texas Style. Texas Monthly described it as "one of our best reality shows yet," offering a "witty insightful, and even touching look at a television station that's probably not much bigger than your average high school AV club...Making News serves up a distinct regional snapshot without ever losing sight of its larger mission, which is to show us the nuts and bolts of how TV news gets produced." The following year, Davis created Making News: Savannah Style following the same premise, but taking place in Savannah, Georgia.

In 2009, he directed the film Blood, Sweat + Gears, about the 2008 season of Team Slipstream, a cycling team devoted to riding clean and succeeding at the highest level of the sport. The film aired on the Sundance Channel.

In 2018, he produced and directed a film for PBS' American Masters program, Ted Williams: "The Greatest Hitter Who Ever Lived," narrated by Emmy- and Golden Globe-winning actor Jon Hamm. The film explores the legendary player's career, relationships, and impact on the game of baseball. The Boston Globe wrote, "The documentary captures everything compelling about Williams — but nothing more so than the satisfying aesthetics of his impossibly picturesque swing.... The film is illuminating and insightful on its subject...Davis does a remarkable job of telling — and showing, mesmerizingly — the full Ted Williams story." The Los Angeles Times wrote that it was "well told.... It had me in tears."

In 2021, Davis produced and directed Leaving Tracks, a feature-length documentary that tells the life story of Robert Haas, otherwise known as Bobby Haas, the founder of the Haas Moto Museum. Leaving Tracks has appeared at over 15 film festivals worldwide, including DocuFest, Montreal Independent Film Festival, New York International Film Festival, and Oniros, where it won Best Documentary Feature.

Davis directed a four-part "30 for 30" ESPN film on the 1986 New York Mets titled Once Upon a Time in Queens. The film, which premiered on September 14 and 15, 2021, was produced in partnership with ESPN Films, Jimmy Kimmel's Kimmelot, ITV America, and Major League Baseball. This multi-part documentary features hours of never-before-seen footage that, according to Awful Announcing, "provides both a rich, affectionate reminder of The '86 Mets and an in-depth biography of a collection of players whose exploits are part of baseball lore." The Wall Street Journal described it as "exhilarating, fun, and triumphal.". According to Davis in an interview with the New York Daily News, "'This isn’t just for Mets fans...this isn’t just for baseball fans, it's for anyone who’s interested in character and story.'" WSJ further called the film "a foul-mouthed fairy tale about what is probably best remembered as a tale of soaring stars and collapsing Red Sox." An editorial at SB Nation stated that: "Once Upon a Time in Queens is a brilliant documentary that creates a full, vibrant picture of the last team to win it all in Queens."

Davis' book, Competing With Idiots, a dual portrait of his grandfather Herman Mankiewicz and granduncle Joseph Mankiewicz, was published by Alfred A. Knopf on September 14, 2021, the same day his Mets documentary premiered. Competing With Idiots is a fascinating, complex story of Hollywood's most dazzling–and famous–brothers, and a dark, riveting tale of competition, love, and enmity that ultimately undid them both. The Washington Post explains that the family orient perspective "gives the book an intimacy that raises the emotional stakes, especially when it comes to dysfunctional family dynamics.". According to the Los Angeles Times, the book is "a tasty combination of film history, family album and psychological study..."Idiots" makes a fine companion to 2020's Mank, the double Oscar winner from David Fincher, while going well beyond that movie's focus on Kane, Herman's 1941 masterpiece. It's a tragic story told with disarming brio, a fitting tribute to brothers who excelled at telling such tales, but not enough to avoid their own fatal flaws.". Commentary also compared the book favorably to Mank, calling it "a fascinating family saga.... The book is a wonderful achievement worthy of its subjects. They should make a movie out of it.".

His documentary film You Had To Be There: How the Toronto Godspell Ignited the Comedy Revolution, Spread Love & Overalls, and Created a Community That Changed the World (In a Canadian Kind of Way), about the cultural impact of a 1972 production of the stage musical Godspell in Toronto, premiered at the 2025 Toronto International Film Festival.

Davis directed the 2025 documentary This Ordinary Thing, which recounts stories of non-Jewish rescuers of Jews during the Holocaust and features an ensemble of voice performances including Helen Mirren, Jeremy Irons, Carrie Coon, Bill Irwin, Ellen Burstyn, and others. Writing in The Forward, Simi Horwitz said Davis “has succeeded” in making a Holocaust film that “shines a light on the often forgotten heroes of the era.” Reviewing the film for Stage and Cinema, Greg Abbott wrote, “It’s a documentary, but it doesn’t feel like one,” adding that “It is never angry — it is gentle.” The film was nominated for the Cinema for Peace Dove for The Most Valuable Documentary of the Year at the 2026 Cinema for Peace Awards in Berlin.

== Recognition ==
In 2016 The Wall Street Journal described the short films that Davis produces for individuals as "a sub-genre that stands at the confluence of current Gilded Age wealth and power."

== Personal Life ==
He is married to novelist Jane Mendelsohn, and they live in New York City. They have two daughters.

== Filmography ==
Year	Title	Subject	Credit(s)
1993	Jack (also known as The Last Kennedy Film)	John F. Kennedy	Writer, Director, Producer (with Peter Davis)
1998	1999	scripted comedy-drama	Writer, Director. Actor
2009	Blood, Sweat & Gears	Tour de France	Director, Producer
2018	Ted Williams: 'The Greatest Hitter Who Ever Lived'	Ted Williams	Writer, Director, Producer
2021	Once Upon a Time in Queens	1986 New York Mets season	Director, Producer
2021	Leaving Tracks	Robert Haas (investor)	Director, Producer
2025	This Ordinary Thing	The Holocaust	Writer, Director, Producer
2025	You Had to Be There	Godspell	Co-Writer (with Jane Mendelsohn), Director, Producer
