= Richard Meryman =

American journalist and biographer (1926–2015)

Richard Sumner Meryman (August 6, 1926 – February 2, 2015) was an American journalist, biographer, and Life magazine writer and editor. He pioneered the monologue-style personality profile, beginning with a famous Marilyn Monroe interview, published two days before her death in 1962, which became the basis for a 1992 HBO program, Marilyn: The Last Interview.

Some of Meryman's most notable interviews were with Charlie Chaplin, Elizabeth Taylor, Laurence Olivier, Mae West, Dustin Hoffman, Gene Hackman, Robert Duvall, Carol Burnett, Burt Reynolds, Orson Welles, Ingmar Bergman, Louis Armstrong, Paul McCartney, Marilyn Horne, Joan Sutherland, Joan Rivers, Neil Simon and Andrew Wyeth, who became a lifelong friend.

A number of those interviews led to books, including two Joan Rivers autobiographies, Louis Armstrong's 1971 self-portrait, Elizabeth Taylor's self-titled 1964 autobiography, and four books on Andrew Wyeth, the last of which was published in 2013. He also reflected on the death of his first wife, artist Hope Meryman, in the 1980 memoir, Hope: A Loss Survived.

== Early life ==
Richard Sumner Meryman Jr. was born August 6, 1926, in Washington, D.C., where his father, Richard S. Meryman, Sr., a portrait and landscape painter, served as principal of the Corcoran School of Art. His mother, Dorothea Bates Meryman, was a kindergarten teacher. He grew up and attended grammar school in Dublin, New Hampshire, and spent summers on his mother's family ranch in Carpinteria, California.

A graduate of Phillips Academy, Andover, and Williams College, Meryman was an all-American lacrosse player and served in the U.S. Navy as an ensign during World War II. He did graduate work at Harvard University. He also spent a year each studying at Tufts University and Amherst College.

In 1949, possessed of "a love of adventure undiminished by caution", as he later recalled, Meryman and future U.S. Senator Daniel Patrick Moynihan, with another friend, bought a 1935 Packard hearse, put a mattress in the back where the coffin should be, and set off for Alaska. After an axle broke on the second day, wiping out their savings, they detoured to Montana, where the Hungry Horse Dam was under construction. All three were hired and almost immediately fired for a variety of mishaps. Close to broke, Meryman and Moynihan hopped freight trains back home.

== Career ==
Shortly after his return, Meryman interviewed for a job at Life magazine and was hired. He always believed it was the adventurous tale of his Alaska trip, along with his childhood in a visual, artistic home, that led the editor to take a chance on an inexperienced writer.

Meryman's first assignment at Life was helping review unsolicited photographs; he later recalled that one species nursing another was a favorite subject. From there, he moved up to sports reporter, where he covered boxing and baseball, including Mickey Mantle's first game with the New York Yankees.

He was transferred to the Life bureau in Beverly Hills in 1951, then to the Chicago bureau in 1953. In Chicago, Meryman worked on a photo essay about the South Side, met Harry Truman, and, in classic Chicago style, while attending a press conference for a local politician, was slipped a $100 bribe by a political aide. He used it to buy a black-and-white photo printer.

In 1956 he moved to Life's New York office, where he worked as the religion editor and then the education editor, writing a piece on exceptional teachers of which he was particularly proud. When Meryman was picked to head the magazine's new department of human affairs, focusing on "people stories", his career took off. The department's sweeping nature gave him free rein to pursue virtually any story he could justify.

Attempting a piece on the experience of great fame, Meryman unsuccessfully tried to interview Cary Grant. Then he set his sights on interviewing Marilyn Monroe, who had just been fired from the unfinished 1962 film, Something's Got to Give, after repeatedly failing to show up for work. After two get-acquainted meetings in New York and an interview of Meryman by her press agent, Monroe agreed to the interview and allowed their hours of conversation to be recorded. The interview, Meryman recalled, was such "a bravura performance, a torrent of emotions, ideas, claims, defenses, accusations, self analysis, anecdotes, gestures, justifications, and squeaky laughter" that "then and there I decided to assemble her words into a monologue—a Marilyn self-portrait on the pages. Between the lines, she herself would reveal her lonely insecurity." It became his trademark style.

Life published Meryman's interview with Monroe in the issue dated August 3, 1962—two days before her death. Comprising a total of eight hours, his interview tapes formed the basis of Marilyn: The Last Interview, a 1992 HBO program.

In 1970, Meryman shifted into covering the acting world and eventually headed the entertainment department at Life. When the magazine ceased publication in 1972 he began a freelance career that lasted the rest of his life, writing for such publications as Lear's (as a contributing editor), People, Vanity Fair, McCall’s, Smithsonian, National Geographic and The New York Times Magazine. He wrote a dozen books.

He turned his attention to non-celebrity subjects, as well—an unwed mother giving up her child for adoption, the struggles of alcoholic women, and his own overwhelming grief at losing Hope to cancer in 1975. With support from his second wife, Elizabeth Meryman, he continued to publish until the end of his life.

Meryman was credited for his emotional and psychological insight and deep empathy for his subjects. He was regarded as an excellent listener with a compassionate, self-effacing manner and thoughtful questions that had a way of opening others up, whether they were on the other side of a tape recorder or sitting around his dining room table.

== Personal life ==
In 1951, while visiting his uncle on the family ranch up the coast in Carpinteria, Meryman met and fell in love with Hope Brooks. They married in 1953, just before he moved to Life's Chicago bureau, and honeymooned in Las Vegas on their way east. Meryman and his first wife had two daughters, Meredith Landis and Helena Meryman. She died of cancer in 1975.

Meryman was also stepfather to Ned and Christopher Burns by his second wife, Elizabeth Meryman.

He died in New York City February 2, 2015, age 88, of pneumonia.

== Bibliography ==
- 1964: Elizabeth Taylor (with Elizabeth Taylor, uncredited)
- 1968: Andrew Wyeth, a major book of the artist's paintings
- 1971: Louis Armstrong — A Self-Portrait (with Louis Armstrong)
- 1978: Mank: The Wit, World, and Life of Herman Mankiewicz
- 1980: Hope: A Loss Survived
- 1984: Broken Promises, Mended Dreams
- 1986: Enter Talking (with Joan Rivers)
- 1991: First Impressions: Andrew Wyeth (young adult book)
- 1991: Still Talking (with Joan Rivers
- 1996: Andrew Wyeth: A Secret Life
- 2001: The Dublin Lake Club: A Centennial History
- 2013: Andrew Wyeth, a spoken self-portrait
