= Robert Haas (investor) =

American investor, photographer, and collector (1947–2021)

- Born: Robert Bradley Haas; June 12, 1947; Cleveland, Ohio, U.S.
- Died: September 28, 2021 (aged 74)
- Education: Yale University; Harvard Law School
- Occupations: Investor; photographer

Robert Bradley Haas (June 12, 1947 – September 28, 2021) was an American investor, photographer, and motorcycle collector.

== Early life and education ==
Haas was born in Cleveland. He grew up there, but left home when he was a high school junior, moving to a rooming house. He received a Bachelor's degree in psychology from Yale University in 1969 and a degree in law from Harvard Law School in 1972.

== Financial career ==
In 1984 he and Thomas Hicks formed the investment company Hicks & Haas in Dallas, Texas. Together, they purchased 49 percent of the soft drink companies 7-Up and Dr Pepper and then resold the combined companies in 1988 to Prudential-Bache Securities for $600 million.

After Hicks & Haas dissolved in 1989, Haas co-founded Haas Wheat & Harrison in 1992 to focus on middle-market transactions. Among his co-founders were Thomas Harrison, who had previously worked with Haas at Hicks & Haas and Douglas Wheat, a former investment banker with Donaldson, Lufkin & Jenrette.

At the time of his death Haas was a senior adviser for New MainStream Capital, an investment firm.

== Photography career ==
Haas took up photography in 1994 with no prior experience. After buying $2000 USD in camera gear, and learning how to use it, he did his first aerial photography from a helicopter on a Kenyan safari. He went on to work for National Geographic as a photographer for ten years, and to publish four coffee-table books on his aerial photography over Africa and Latin America.

== Motorcycle collection ==
In 2012 Haas began collecting motorcycles. In 2018, he opened the Haas Moto Museum & Sculpture Gallery in Dallas to display the collection, which includes several custom-made motorcycles. He was the executive producer of the film Leaving Tracks, which documented his motorcycle collecting and profiled several custom motorcycle builders who contributed to his collection.

== Books ==
- Through the Eyes of the Gods, 2005
- Through the Eyes of the Condor, 2007
- African Critters, 2008
- Through The Eyes Of The Vikings, 2010
- I dreamed of Flying like a Bird, 2010
