= Herman J. Mankiewicz =

American screenwriter (1897–1953)

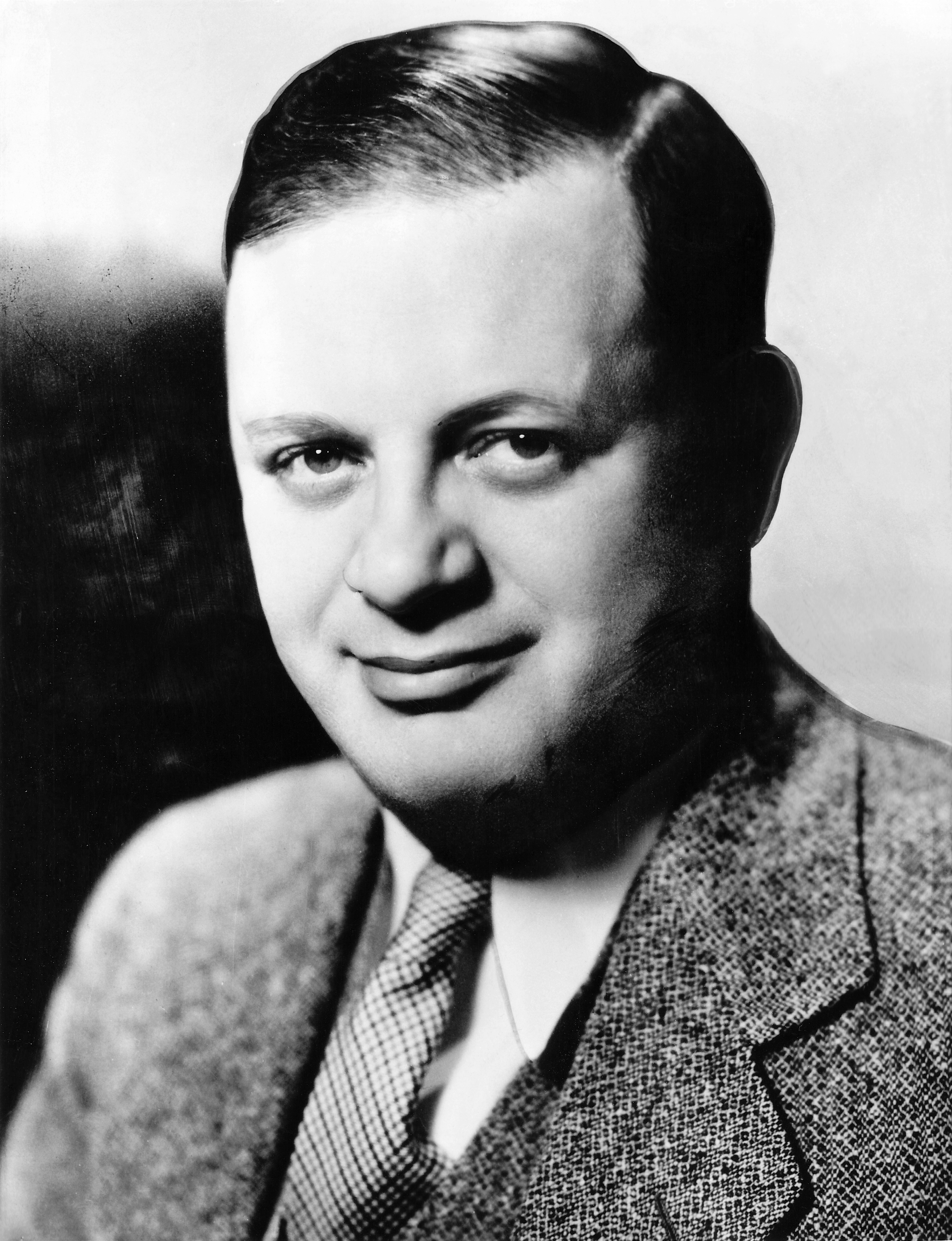
- Mankiewicz in the 1940s
- Born: Herman Jacob Mankiewicz; November 7, 1897; New York City, U.S.
- Died: March 5, 1953 (aged 55); Los Angeles, California, U.S.
- Education: Columbia University (BA)
- Occupation: Screenwriter
- Years active: 1926–1952
- Spouse: Sara Aaronson (m. 1920)
- Children: 3, including Don Mankiewicz and Frank Mankiewicz
- Family: Joseph L. Mankiewicz (brother); See Mankiewicz family

Herman Jacob Mankiewicz (/ˈmæŋkəwɪts/ MANG-kə-wits; November 7, 1897 – March 5, 1953) was an American screenwriter who, with Orson Welles, wrote the screenplay for Citizen Kane (1941). Both Mankiewicz and Welles went on to receive the Academy Award for Best Original Screenplay for the film. Mankiewicz was previously a Berlin correspondent for Women’s Wear Daily, assistant theater editor at The New York Times, and the first regular drama critic at The New Yorker. Alexander Woollcott said that Mankiewicz was the "funniest man in New York".

Mankiewicz was often asked to fix other writers' screenplays, with much of his work uncredited. His writing style became valued in the films of the 1930s—a style that included a slick, satirical, and witty humor, in which dialogue almost totally carried the film, and which eventually become associated with the "typical American film" of that period. In addition to Citizen Kane, he wrote or worked on films including The Wizard of Oz, Man of the World, Dinner at Eight, The Pride of the Yankees and The Pride of St. Louis.

Film critic Pauline Kael credits Mankiewicz with having written, alone or with others, "about forty of the films I remember best from the twenties and thirties...He was a key linking figure in just the kind of movies my friends and I loved best." Nearly seventy years after his death, Mankiewicz was portrayed by actor Gary Oldman in the 2020 Oscar-winning film Mank.

== Early life ==
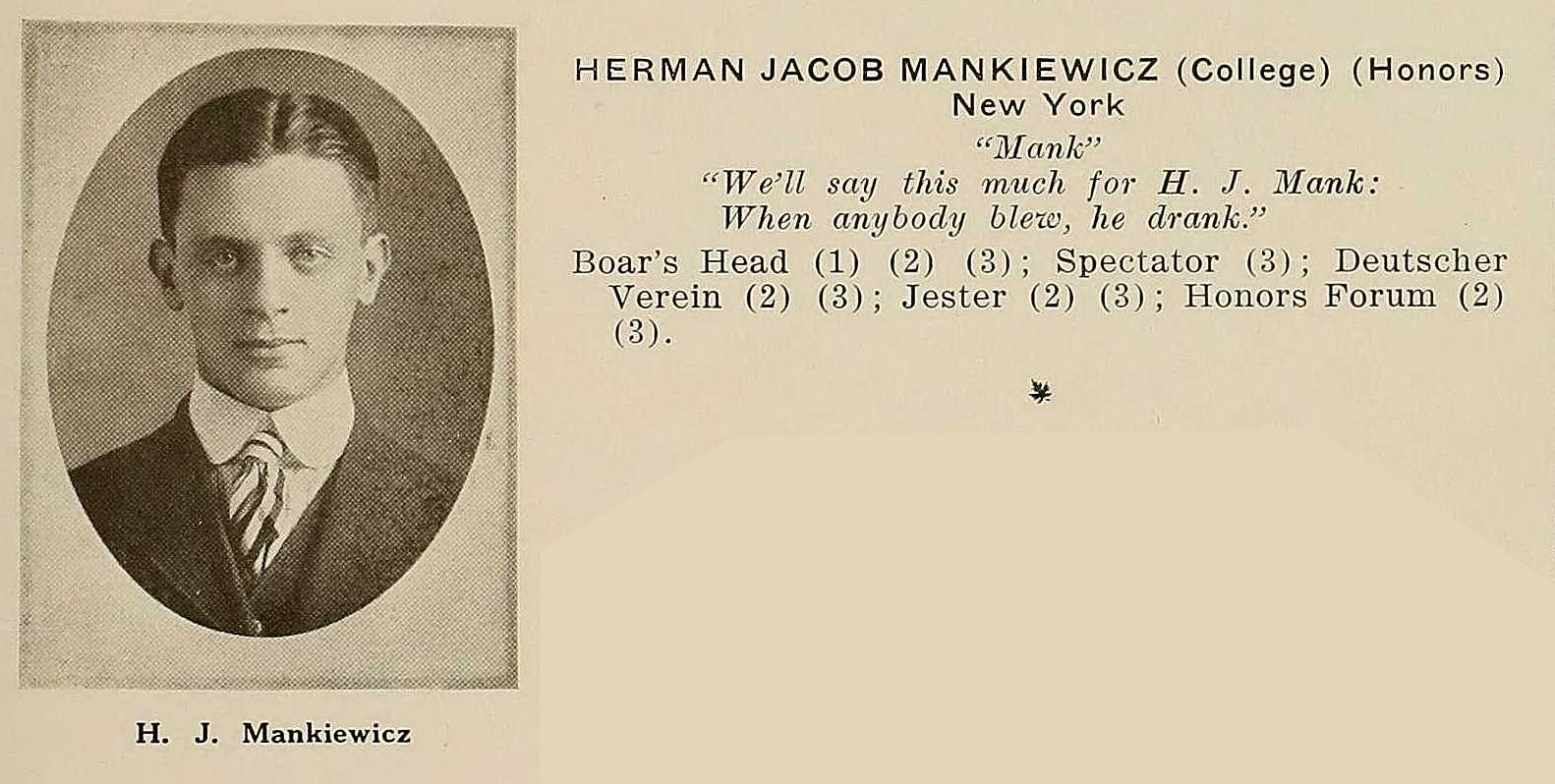
Mankiewicz in the Columbia University yearbook, 1917

Mankiewicz was born in New York City in 1897. His parents were German-Jewish immigrants: his father, Franz Mankiewicz, was born in Berlin and emigrated to the U.S. from Hamburg in 1892. In New York he met his wife, Johanna Blumenau, a seamstress from the Kurland region of Latvia. The family lived first in New York, then moved to Wilkes-Barre, Pennsylvania, where Herman's father accepted a teaching position. In 1909, Herman's brother, Joseph L. Mankiewicz—who later became a successful writer, producer, and director—was born, and both boys and a sister, Erna, spent their childhood there. Census records indicate the family lived on Academy Street.

Mankiewicz was described as a "bookish, introspective child who, despite his intelligence, was never able to win approval from his demanding father" who was known to belittle his achievements. The family moved to New York City in 1913, where Herman's father accepted a teaching position, at Stuyvesant High School, and Herman graduated from Columbia College in 1917 where he was the “Off-Hour” editor of the Columbia Spectator student newspaper. and a member of the Philolexian Society.

== Early career ==
After a period as managing editor of the American Jewish Chronicle and a reporter at the New York Tribune, he joined the United States Army Air Service to fly planes, but because of airsickness, enlisted instead as a private first class with the Marines, A.E.F. In 1919 and 1920, he was director of the American Red Cross News Service in Paris.

== Marriage ==
After returning to the U.S., he married Sara Aaronson of Baltimore. He took her overseas on his next job as a newspaper writer in Berlin from 1920 to 1922; then returned to the U.S. to do political reporting for George Seldes on the Chicago Tribune. Herman and Sara had three children: screenwriter Don Mankiewicz (1922–2015), political adviser Frank Mankiewicz (1924–2014), and novelist Johanna Mankiewicz Davis (1937–1974).

== Reporter, publicist, playwright ==
While a reporter in Berlin, Mankiewicz also sent pieces on drama and books to The New York Times. At one point he was hired in Berlin by dancer Isadora Duncan to be her publicist in preparation for her return tour in the United States. At home again in the U.S., he took a job as a reporter for the New York World. Known as a "gifted, prodigious writer," he contributed to Vanity Fair, The Saturday Evening Post, and numerous other magazines. While still in his twenties, he collaborated with Heywood Broun, Dorothy Parker, Robert E. Sherwood and others on a revue; and collaborated with George S. Kaufman on a play, The Good Fellows, and with Marc Connelly on the play The Wild Man of Borneo (1927). From 1923 to 1926, he was at The New York Times as assistant theater editor to George S. Kaufman, and soon after became the first regular theater critic for The New Yorker, writing a column during 1925 and early 1926. He was a member of the Algonquin Round Table. His writing attracted the notice of film producer Walter Wanger, who offered him a contract to work at Paramount, and Mankiewicz soon moved to Hollywood.

== Hollywood ==
=== Early success ===
Paramount paid Mankiewicz $400 a week plus bonuses, and by the end of 1927, he was head of Paramount's scenario department. Film critic Pauline Kael wrote about him and the creation of Citizen Kane in "Raising Kane", her 1971 New Yorker article: "In January, 1928, there was a newspaper item reporting that he (Mankiewicz) was in New York 'lining up a new set of newspaper feature writers and playwrights to bring to Hollywood... Most of the newer writers on Paramount's staff who contributed the most successful stories of the past year' were selected by 'Mank.'" Film historian Scott Eyman notes that Mankiewicz was put in charge of writer recruitment by Paramount. As "a hard-drinking gambler," however, he hired men in his own image, such as Ben Hecht, Bartlett Cormack, Edwin Justus Mayer—writers comfortable with the iconoclasm of big-city newsrooms who would introduce their sardonic worldliness to movie audiences.

Kael notes that "beginning in 1926, Mankiewicz worked on an astounding number of films." In 1927 and 1928, he did the titles (printed dialogue and explanations) for at least twenty-five films starring Clara Bow, Bebe Daniels, Nancy Carroll, Wallace Beery and other public favorites. By then, sound had arrived, and in 1929 he wrote the script and dialogue for The Dummy, and scripts for many other directors, including William Wellman and Josef von Sternberg.

Other screenwriters made large contributions to Hollywood's early sound films, but "probably none larger than Mankiewicz," according to Kael. At the beginning of the Talkies era, he was one of the highest-paid writers in the world, because, Kael writes, "He wrote the kind of movies that were disapproved of as 'fast' and immoral. His heroes weren't soft-eyed and bucolic; he brought good-humored toughness to the movies, and energy and astringency. And the public responded, because it was eager for modern American subjects." Ben Hecht described him as "a Promethean wit bound in a Promethean body, one of the most entertaining men in existence ... [and] called the 'Central Park West Voltaire' ".

According to Kael, Mankiewicz did not work on every kind of picture. He did not do Westerns, for example; and once, when a studio attempted to punish him for his customary misbehavior by assigning him to a Rin Tin Tin picture, he rebelled by turning in a script that began with the craven dog frightened by a mouse and reached its climax with a house on fire and the dog taking a baby into the flames. (Note: Mankiewicz wrote at least two Jack Holt Westerns, Avalanche and The Water Hole.)

=== Style ===
Shortly after his arrival on the West Coast, Mankiewicz sent a telegram to journalist-friend Ben Hecht in New York: "Millions are to be grabbed out here and your only competition is idiots. Don't let this get around." In the film The Front Page, when the sheriff asks who threw a bucket out the window, Walter Catlett's character replies, "Judge Mankiewicz threw it," a nod to his friend by Hecht. He attracted other New York writers to Hollywood who contributed to a burst of creative, tough, sardonic styles of writing for the fast-growing movie industry.

Between 1929 and 1935, he worked on at least twenty films, many for which he received no credit. Between 1930 and 1932 he was either producer or associate producer on four comedies and helped write their screenplays without credit: Laughter, Monkey Business, Horse Feathers, and Million Dollar Legs, which many critics considered one of the funniest comedies of the early 1930s. In 1933, he moved to Metro-Goldwyn-Mayer where, along with Frances Marion, he adapted Dinner at Eight, which was based on the George S. Kaufman/Edna Ferber play, and became one of the most popular comedies at that time and remains a "classic" comedy.

=== The Mad Dog of Europe ===
In 1933, Mankiewicz went on leave from MGM to write a film warning Americans about the rise of Adolf Hitler in Germany. No studio was willing to produce his screenplay, The Mad Dog of Europe, and in 1935, MGM was notified by Joseph Goebbels, the Minister of Education and Propaganda under Hitler, that films written by Mankiewicz could not be shown in Nazi Germany unless his name was removed from the screen credits. During World War II, Mankiewicz officially sponsored and took financial responsibility for many refugees fleeing Nazi Germany for the United States.

A 2026 full-length documentary, directed by Rubika Shah and also called The Mad Dog of Europe, explores the vicissitudes of the screenplay and the prohibitions it arouse.

=== The Wizard of Oz ===
In February 1938, Mankiewicz was assigned as the first of ten screenwriters to work on The Wizard of Oz. Three days after he started writing, he handed in a 17-page treatment of what was later known as "the Kansas sequence". While L. Frank Baum devoted less than a thousand words in his book to Kansas, Mankiewicz almost balanced the attention between Kansas and Oz, feeling it necessary that audiences relate to Dorothy Gale in a real world before she was transported to a magic one. By the end of the week he had finished 56 pages, and included instructions to film the scenes in Kansas in black and white. His goal, according to film historian Aljean Harmetz, was to "capture in pictures what Baum had captured in words—the grey lifelessness of Kansas contrasted with the visual richness of Oz." He was not credited for his work on the film.

=== Citizen Kane ===
Mankiewicz is best known for his collaboration with Orson Welles on the screenplay of Citizen Kane, for which they shared an Academy Award. The authorship later became a source of controversy. Pauline Kael attributed Kane's screenplay to Mankiewicz in a 1971 essay that was and continues to be strongly disputed. Much debate has centered on this issue, largely because of the importance of the film itself, which most agree is a fictionalized biography of newspaper publisher William Randolph Hearst. According to film biographer David Thomson, however, "No one can now deny Herman Mankiewicz credit for the germ, shape, and pointed language of the screenplay..."

Mankiewicz biographer Richard Meryman notes that the dispute had various causes, including the way the movie was promoted. When RKO opened the movie on Broadway on May 1, 1941, followed by showings at theaters in other large cities, the publicity programs included photographs of Welles as "the one-man band, directing, acting, and writing." In a letter to his father afterwards, Mankiewicz wrote, "I'm particularly furious at the incredibly insolent description of how Orson wrote his masterpiece. The fact is that there isn't one single line in the picture that wasn't in writing—writing from and by me—before ever a camera turned." Mankiewicz biographer Sydney Ladensohn Stern discounts his assertion as his defensiveness with his father, especially because he and other family members had recently bailed him out financially.

According to film historian Otto Friedrich, it made Mankiewicz "unhappy to hear Welles quoted in Louella Parsons's column, before the question of screen credits was officially settled, as saying, 'So I wrote Citizen Kane.' Mankiewicz went to the Screen Writers Guild and declared that he was the original author. Welles later claimed that he planned on a joint credit all along, but Mankiewicz sometimes claimed that Welles offered him a bonus of ten thousand dollars if he would let Welles take full credit. Welles eventually agreed to share credit with Mankiewicz and furthermore, to list his name first. Sometime later, Welles commented on this allegation:

God, if I hadn't loved him I would have hated him after all those ridiculous stories, persuading people I was offering him money to have his name taken off ... that he would be carrying on like this, denouncing me as a coauthor, screaming around.

==== Hearst's inner circle ====
Mankiewicz became good friends with Hollywood screenwriter Charles Lederer, who was Marion Davies's nephew. Lederer grew up as a Hollywood habitué, spending much time at San Simeon, where Davies reigned as William Randolph Hearst's mistress. As one of Mankiewicz's admirers in the early 1930s, Hearst often invited him to spend the weekend at San Simeon.

"Herman told Joe to come to the office of their mutual friend Charlie Lederer." "Mankiewicz found himself on story-swapping terms with the power behind it all, Hearst himself. When he had been in Hollywood only a short time, he met Marion Davies and Hearst through his friendship with Charles Lederer, a writer, then in his early twenties, whom Ben Hecht had met and greatly admired in New York when Lederer was still in his teens. Lederer, a child prodigy who had entered college at thirteen, got to know Mankiewicz." Herman eventually "saw Hearst as 'a finagling, calculating, Machiavellian figure.' But also, with Charlie Lederer, ... wrote and had printed parodies of Hearst newspapers."

In 1939, Mankiewicz suffered a broken leg in a driving accident and had to be hospitalized. During his hospital stay, one of his visitors was Orson Welles, who met him earlier and had become a great admirer of his wit. During the months after his release from the hospital, he and Welles began working on story ideas which led to the creation of Citizen Kane.

Despite Welles' denial that the film was about Hearst, few people were convinced—including Hearst. After the release of Citizen Kane, Hearst pursued a longtime vendetta against Mankiewicz and Welles for writing the story. "Certain elements in the film were taken from Mankiewicz's own experience: the sled Rosebud was based—according to some sources—on a very important bicycle that was stolen from him. ... [and] some of Kane's speeches are almost verbatim copies of Hearst's." Most personally, the word "rosebud" was reportedly Hearst's private nickname for Davies' clitoris. Hearst's thoughts about the film are unknown; what is certain is that his extensive chain of newspapers and radio stations blocked all mentions of the film, and refused to accept advertising for it, while some Hearst employees worked behind the scenes to block or restrict its distribution.

==== Academy Award celebration ====
Citizen Kane was nominated for an Academy Award in every possible category, including Best Original Screenplay. Meryman writes, "Herman insisted he had no chance to win, though The Hollywood Reporter had given the film first place in ten of its twelve divisions. The fear of Hearst, he felt, was still alive. And Hollywood's resentment and distrust of Welles, the nonconformist upstart, were even greater since he had lived up to his wonderboy ballyhoo." Neither Welles nor Mankiewicz attended the dinner, which was broadcast on radio. Welles was in South America filming It's All True, and Herman refused to attend. "He did not want to be humiliated," said his wife, Sara.

Richard Meryman describes the evening:

On the night of the awards, Herman turned on his radio and sat in his bedroom chair. Sara lay on the bed. As the screenplay category approached, he pretended to be hardly listening. Suddenly from the radio, half screamed, came "Herman J. Mankiewicz." Welles's name as coauthor was drowned out by voices all through the audience calling out, "Mank! Mank! Where is he?" And audible above all others was Irene Selznick: "Where is he?"

George J. Schaefer accepted Herman's Oscar. "Except for this coauthor award, the Motion Picture Academy excommunicated Orson Welles," wrote Meryman, "[and] as Pauline Kael put it, 'The members of the Academy ... probably felt good because their hearts had gone out to crazy, reckless Mank, their own resident loser-genius."

Richard Meryman concludes that "taken as a whole ... Citizen Kane was overwhelmingly Welles's film, a triumph of intense personal magic. Herman was one of the talents, the crucial one, that were mined by Welles. But one marvels at the debt those two self-destroyers owe to each other. Without Welles there would have been no supreme moment for Herman. Without Mankiewicz there would have been no perfect idea at the perfect time for Welles ... to confirm his genius ... The Citizen Kane script was true creative symbiosis, a partnership greater than the sum of its parts."

== Alcoholism and death ==
Mankiewicz was an alcoholic. Ten years before his death, he wrote: "I seem to become more and more of a rat in a trap of my own construction, a trap that I regularly repair whenever there seems to be danger of some opening that will enable me to escape. I haven't decided yet about making it bomb proof. It would seem to involve a lot of unnecessary labor and expense." A future Hollywood biographer went so far as to suggest that Mankiewicz’s behavior "made him seem erratic even by the standards of Hollywood drunks."

Mankiewicz died March 5, 1953, at age of 55, of uremic poisoning, the result of liver failure, at Cedars of Lebanon Hospital in Los Angeles. Orson Welles said of him, "He saw everything with clarity. No matter how odd or how right or how marvelous his point of view was, it was always diamond white. Nothing muzzy."

== Legacy ==
In looking back on his early films, Pauline Kael wrote that Mankiewicz had, in fact, written (alone or with others) "about forty of the films I remember best from the twenties and thirties. I hadn't realized how extensive his career was. ... and now that I have looked into Herman Mankiewicz's career it's apparent that he was a key linking figure in just the kind of movies my friends and I loved best. These were the hardest-headed periods of American movies ... [and] the most highly acclaimed directors of that period, suggests that the writers ... in little more than a decade, gave American talkies their character."

Director and screenwriter Nunnally Johnson claimed that the "two most brilliant men he has ever known were George S. Kaufman and Herman Mankiewicz, and that Mankiewicz was the more brilliant of the two. ... [and] spearheaded the movement of that whole Broadway style of wisecracking, fast-talking, cynical-sentimental entertainment onto the national scene."

His friend Ben Hecht wrote shortly after Mankiewicz's death.

When I remember the dull and inane whom Herman enriched by his presence, and his numbskull "betters" who tried feebly to echo his observations; when I remember his throw-away genius, his modesty, his shrug at adversity; when I remember that unlike the lords of success around him he attacked only the strong with his wit and defended always the weak with his heart, I feel proud to have known a man of importance.

In 2024, Mankiewicz was announced as a posthumous inductee into the Luzerne County Arts & Entertainment Hall of Fame.

== Depictions ==
Mankiewicz is played by John Malkovich in RKO 281, a 1999 American film about the battle over Citizen Kane.

Mank, a black-and-white Mankiewicz biopic directed by David Fincher and starring Gary Oldman in the title role, was released on Netflix in December 2020. Oldman was nominated for the Academy Award for Best Actor for his performance.

== Filmography ==
He was involved with the following films:

- The Road to Mandalay (1926) — Writer (story credit)
- Stranded in Paris (1926) — Writer (adaptation)
- Fashions for Women (1927) — Writer
- A Gentleman of Paris (1927) (titles)
- The City Gone Wild (1927) — Writer (titles)
- Honeymoon Hate (1927) — Writer (titles)
- The Gay Defender (1927) — Writer (titles)
- Two Flaming Youths (1927) — Writer (titles)
- Love and Learn (1928) — Writer (titles)
- The Last Command (1928) — Writer (titles)
- Something Always Happens (1928) — Writer (titles)
- A Night of Mystery (1928/I) — Writer (titles)
- Abie's Irish Rose (1928) — Writer (titles)
- His Tiger Lady (1928) — Writer (titles)
- The Dragnet (1928) — Writer (titles)
- The Magnificent Flirt (1928) — Writer (titles)
- The Mating Call (1928) — Writer (titles), Newspaperman (uncredited)
- The Water Hole (1928) — Writer (titles)
- Take Me Home (1928) — Writer (titles)
- Avalanche (1928) — Writer (screenplay) (titles)
- The Barker (1928) — Writer (titles)
- Gentlemen Prefer Blondes (1928) — Writer (titles)
- Three Weekends (1928) — Writer (titles)
- What a Night! (1928) — Writer (titles)
- The Love Doctor (1929) — Writer (titles)
- The Canary Murder Case (1929) — Writer (titles)
- The Dummy (1929) — Writer
- The Man I Love (1929) — Writer (story)
- Thunderbolt (1929) — Writer
- The Mighty (1929) — Writer (titles)
- The Vagabond King (1930) — Writer (screenplay) (story)
- Men Are Like That (1930) — Writer (adaptation)
- Honey (1930) — Writer (scenario) (titles)
- Ladies Love Brutes (1930) — Writer (screenplay)
- True to the Navy (1930) — Writer (dialogue)
- Love Among the Millionaires (1930) — Writer (dialogue)
- Laughter (1930) — Writer
- The Royal Family of Broadway (1930) — Writer (adaptation)
- Salga de la cocina (1931) — Writer (adaptation)
- The Front Page (1931) — Bit (uncredited)
- Every Woman Has Something (1931) — Writer (adaptation)
- Man of the World (1931) — Writer (screenplay) (story)
- Ladies' Man (1931) — Writer
- Monkey Business (1931) — producer
- The Lost Squadron (1932) — Writer (additional dialogue)
- Dancers in the Dark (1932) — Writer
- Girl Crazy (1932) — Writer
- Million Dollar Legs (1932) — producer
- Horse Feathers (1932) — producer (uncredited)
- Another Language (1933) — Writer
- Dinner at Eight (1933) — Writer (screenplay)
- Meet the Baron (1933) — Writer
- Duck Soup (1933) — producer (uncredited)
- The Show-Off (1934) — Writer
- Stamboul Quest (1934) — Writer (screenplay)
- After Office Hours (1935) — Writer
- Escapade (1935) — Writer
- Three Maxims (1936) — Writer
- Love in Exile (1936) — Writer
- John Meade's Woman (1937) — Writer
- The Emperor's Candlesticks (1937) — contributor to dialogue (uncredited)
- My Dear Miss Aldrich (1937) — Writer (original story and screenplay)
- It's a Wonderful World (1939) — Writer (story)
- The Wizard of Oz (1939) — Writer (uncredited)
- The Ghost Comes Home (1940) — Writer (contributing writer)
- Comrade X (1940) — Writer (uncredited)
- Keeping Company (1940) — Writer (story)
- The Wild Man of Borneo (1941) — Writer (play)
- Citizen Kane (1941) — Writer (screenplay), Newspaperman (uncredited)
- Rise and Shine (1941) — Writer (screenplay)
- This Time for Keeps (1942) — Writer (characters)
- The Pride of the Yankees (1942) — Writer (screenplay)
- Stand By for Action (1942) — Writer (screenplay)
- The Good Fellows (1943) — Writer (play)
- Christmas Holiday (1944) — Writer
- The Enchanted Cottage (1945) — Writer
- The Spanish Main (1945) — Writer (screenplay)
- A Woman's Secret (1949) — Writer (screenplay), producer
- The Pride of St. Louis (1952) — Writer
- Lux Video Theatre (TV series episode, 1955): The Enchanted Cottage — Writer (original screenplay)

== Works ==
=== Essays and reporting ===
- H. J. M. (February 28, 1925). "The "World" is with us". Behind the News. The New Yorker. Vol. 1, no. 2. pp. 4–5.
- — (June 6, 1925). "The theatre". Critique. The New Yorker. Vol. 1, no. 16. p. 13.
- — (June 13, 1925). "The theatre". Critique. The New Yorker. Vol. 1, no. 17. p. 15.

=== Short fiction ===
- Mankiewicz, Herman J., "The Big Game," The New Yorker, November 14, 1925, p. 11
- Mankiewicz, Herman J., "A New Yorker in the provinces," The New Yorker, February 6, 1926, p. 16

=== Novelization ===
- Browning, Tod & Herman J. Mankiewicz (1926). The Road to Mandalay: a Thrilling Throbbing Romance of Singapore. New York: Jacobsen Hodgkinson Corporation. for The Road to Mandalay (1926 film)

=== Plays ===
- Kaufman, George S. & Herman J. Mankiewicz (1931). The good fellow : a play in three acts. New York: S. French.

=== Critical studies, reviews and biography ===
- Meryman, Richard (1978). Mank : the wit, world and life of Herman Mankiewicz.
- Stern, Sydney Ladensohn (2019). The Brothers Mankiewicz: Hope, Heartbreak, and Hollywood Classics
