= Turner Classic Movies =

American classic movie-oriented television channel

- Country: United States
- Broadcast area: United States; Canada
- Headquarters: Ted Turner Campus, 1050 Techwood Drive, Atlanta, Georgia, United States

Programming
- Languages: English (imported feature films are broadcast in their native languages, provided with English subtitling)
- Picture format: 1080i HDTV (downscaled to 480i letterboxed for the SDTV feed)

Ownership
- Owner: Turner Broadcasting System (1994–1996); Time Warner (1996–2018); WarnerMedia (2018–2022); Warner Bros. Discovery (2022–2026); Skydance (2026–present)
- Parent: Warner Bros. Entertainment

History
- Launched: April 14, 1994; 32 years ago
- Founder: Ted Turner

Links
- Website: www.tcm.com

Availability

Streaming media
- Affiliated Streaming Service: HBO Max
- TCM.com: Watch TCM (U.S. pay-TV subscribers only)
- Service(s): Hulu with Live TV, Sling TV, YouTube TV

Turner Classic Movies (TCM) is an American movie-oriented pay television channel owned by Warner Bros. Entertainment, a division of Skydance. It carries a variety of programming, consisting mostly of theatrically released feature films from the Turner Entertainment Co. film library. These films are from Warner Bros. (covering films released before 1950), Metro-Goldwyn-Mayer (MGM, covering films released before May 1986), and the North American distribution rights to films from RKO Radio Pictures.

In 1981, MGM acquired United Artists (UA) for $380 million, which formed the MGM/UA Entertainment Company. Five years later, in 1986, Kirk Kerkorian sold MGM/UA to Ted Turner, who retained the rights to the MGM/UA film library. Due to excessive debt from the purchase, Turner sold the MGM studio lot in Culver City to Lorimar-Telepictures, and sold MGM's studio operations back to Kerkorian a few months later. In 1993, Turner announced he would form a commercial-free classic movie channel, which was expected to compete with American Movie Classics (now initialized as AMC).

Turner Classic Movies was launched on April 14, 1994, and remains headquartered at Turner's Techwood broadcasting campus in the Midtown business district of Atlanta, Georgia. The channel broadcast a variety of genre programming, including film noir, musicals, and silent films, as well as international films and documentaries. Since the channel's launch, Robert Osborne served as the primary primetime host until his death in March 2017. Since Osborne's death, Ben Mankiewicz, who joined TCM as a weekend afternoon host in 2003, became the primetime host.

Since its debut, TCM has marketed its brand to appeal to cinephiles, in which they hold an annual film festival in Los Angeles, and an annual cruise line. Outside of the United States and Canada, the channel's international counterparts are also available in France, French-speaking Switzerland, French-speaking Belgium and Spain.

== History ==
=== Beginnings ===
In 1981, Metro-Goldwyn-Mayer (MGM) purchased United Artists (UA) for $380 million. Three years later, in 1984, Ted Turner looked to acquire a library of entertainment programming, primarily for his Atlanta-based "superstation" WTBS. An attempt to acquire CBS had failed when the network announced a large stock buyback to thwart Turner's takeover attempt. In July 1985, Kirk Kerkorian, who had controlled a 50 percent stake of MGM/UA, told Turner he would auction the MGM studio the next month for $1.6 billion. However, the deal did not include the film libraries for United Artists and the pre-1950 Warner Bros. catalogue. Turner replied he would buy MGM if the other libraries were part of the acquisition.

On August 7, 1985, Turner Broadcasting System announced it would acquire MGM/UA for $1.5 billion and Turner would immediately sell United Artists back to Kerkorian for $470 million, resulting in a net purchase price of just below $1 billion. Turner stated, "The acquisition of MGM represents an excellent opportunity to improve the strength and stability of TBS [...] We look forward to prompt completion of the merger and working with the employees of MGM toward a smooth transition." As part of the merger deal, Turner would also have to assume $500 million of MGM's existing debt. To finance the purchase, Turner retained the investment firm Drexel Burnham Lambert as its financial adviser, in which a tentative deal was proposed to raise a "substantial portion" of the required cash through selling high-yield junk bonds.

Turner's initial offer to acquire MGM/UA was $29 per share, for a total of $1.5 billion. However, by October 1985, it was reported Turner was having trouble raising the finances for the deal and was considering relinquishing some company assets. The deal was renegotiated to $25 per share in cash and one share of preferred stock with Turner Broadcasting. On January 14, 1986, it was reported that negotiations for the scaled-down $1.45 billion merger had reached an impasse and both parties were looking to salvage the deal. Both parties released a statement, stating they were "in discussions with a view to a possible restructuring of the agreement under which Turner Broadcasting is to acquire MGM-UA." Three days later, Turner Broadcasting agreed to pay $20 per share in cash and one dividend share of Turner preferred stock of $10.33, for a grand total of $1.25 billion.

On March 4, 1986, the shareholders of both Turner Broadcasting and MGM/UA approved the merger deal. The merger deal was completed on March 25, 1986, which granted Turner the ownership of MGM/UA's film library. The library also included the RKO and pre-1950 Warner Bros. films, which were purchased by Associated Artists Productions (A.A.P.) and then acquired by United Artists in 1958. Turner renamed his studio division MGM Entertainment Co. However, Turner Broadcasting System's corporate debt load totaled $2 billion, and Turner simply could not afford to keep MGM under those circumstances. By June 1986, Turner had agreed to sell MGM back to Kerkorian, from whom Turner had purchased the studio only three months before. Financial analysts estimated that Turner had overpaid to acquire MGM. As a condition of the financial agreement, Turner was required to make principal repayments of $600 million within six months of the merger (by September 1986), or extend the maturity of debt which would likely include higher interest rates.

On August 26, 1986, Turner sold MGM's production and distribution operations for $300 million to United Artists, while MGM's studio lot and film processing laboratories were sold for $190 million to Lorimar-Telepictures. However, Turner Broadcasting still retained the pre-May 1986 MGM/UA film library. When the exchange was finalized, Turner rebranded his division Turner Entertainment Company.

In May 1993, speaking at the Detroit Economic Club, Turner disclosed he was developing a commercial-free movie channel that would broadcast films from his studio library. On June 6, 1993, the company's board of directors approved the channel. Afterwards, Turner announced the formation of Turner Classic Movies (TCM) during the company's annual shareholders meeting. Brad Siegel, who joined Turner in January 1993 as executive vice president of TNT, was selected to oversee the channel. In August 1993, after it was announced that Turner had acquired the exclusive rights to 300 films from Paramount Pictures, Siegel told Variety that the channel's programming would extend beyond the films included in Turner's film library. Similar to AMC, Siegel stated there would be a host who introduced the films with no commercial interruptions, and the programming would also include international films produced outside of the United States.

When the channel was announced, it had been observed among media outlets that TCM would serve as a direct competitor to American Movie Classics (now initialized as just AMC). Beforehand, it had been reported that Turner had expressed interest in acquiring the channel. After Siegel was hired, Turner Broadcasting reclaimed 13 films it had previously licensed to AMC.

Addressing the competition, Siegel claimed that market research had indicated there was consumer demand for more movies on cable television. He also stated, "AMC does not have access to any of the 2,500 MGM and pre-1948 Warner Brothers titles owned by Turner. The movies in these two libraries are considered to be some of the best movies ever made, and they will never be seen on AMC. Owning the product -- not being bound by restrictive licensing deals -- allows TCM to run more movies per month than AMC." Regardless, Kate McEnroe, then AMC's general manager, remained unconcerned, in which she stated: "The Turner people tend to be a bit hyperbolic. We don't really see them as a challenger."

=== Launch and contributions (1994–1996) ===
Logo used from 1994 to 2021

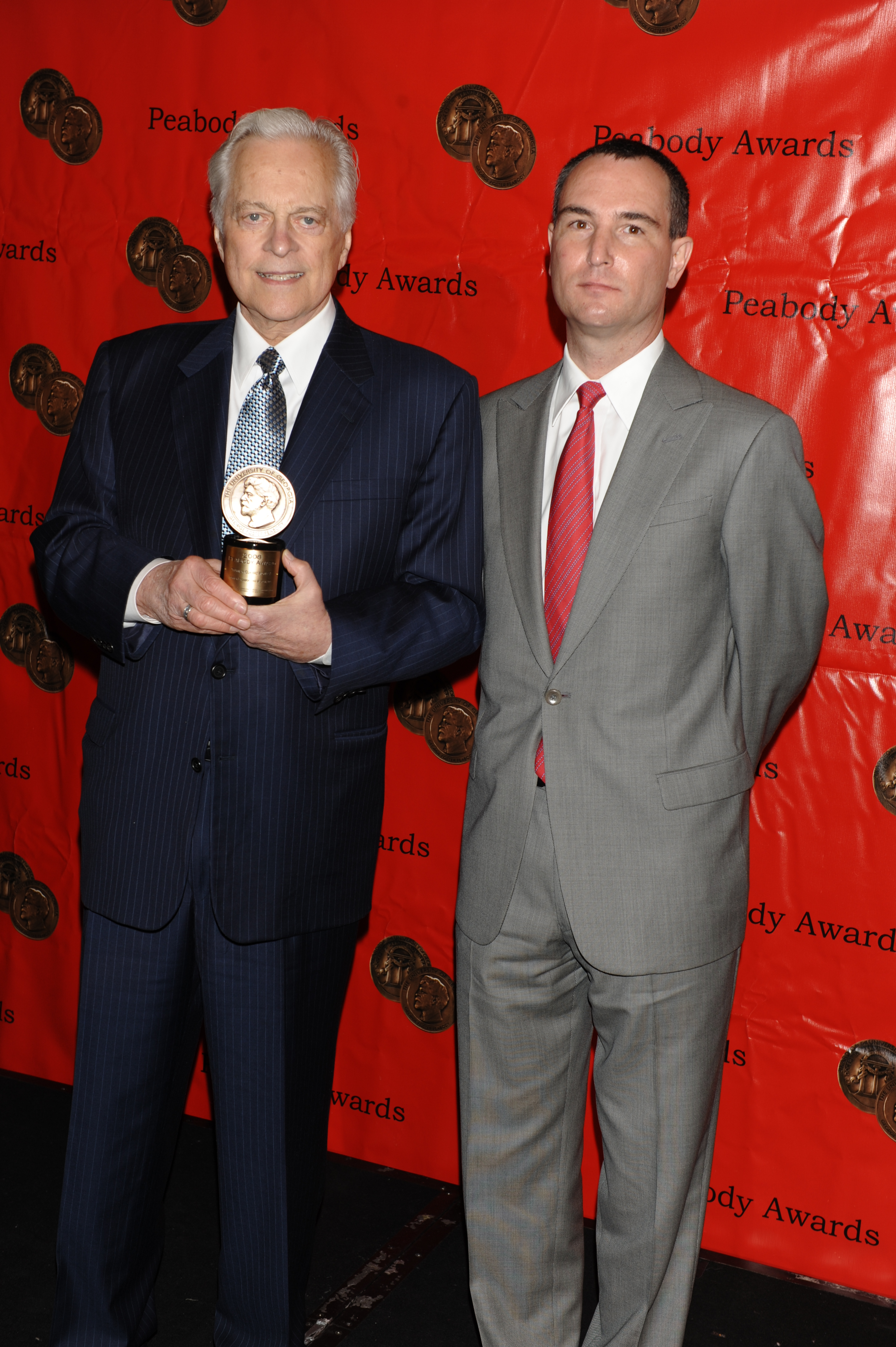
In May 2009, host Robert Osborne and Charles Tabesh, senior vice president for programming, accepted Turner Classic Movies' Institutional Peabody Award "for a continuing, powerful commitment to a central concept—the place of film in social and cultural experience".

Turner Classic Movies debuted on April 14, 1994, at 6 p.m. Eastern Time, with Ted Turner launching the channel at a ceremony in New York City's Times Square district. The date and time were chosen to mark the exact centennial anniversary of the first commercial exhibition of a motion picture in the United States. Gone with the Wind (1939) was the first film broadcast on TCM; it was also the same film that served as the debut broadcast of its sister channel TNT six years earlier on October 3, 1988. At the time of its launch, Turner Classic Movies was available to approximately 1 million cable television subscribers.

=== Time Warner ownership (1996–2018) ===
In 1996, Turner Broadcasting System merged with Time Warner which, besides placing Turner Classic Movies and Time Warner Entertainment under the same corporate umbrella, also gave Turner Classic Movies access to Warner Bros.' library of films released after 1950 (which itself includes other acquired entities such as the Lorimar, Saul Zaentz and National General Pictures libraries); incidentally, Turner Classic Movies had already been running select Warner Bros. film titles through a licensing agreement with the studio that was signed prior to the launch of the channel.

In May 2002, AMC announced it was abandoning its commercial-free format, doubling its number of commercials from four to eight minutes an hour. It also announced it was expanding its programming to include more contemporary films. On September 30, 2002, AMC underwent a significant rebranding, in which they retired the American Movie Classics name and debuted a new logo and tagline. Its revamped approach was expanded to broadcast contemporary films and original programming. This made Turner Classic Movies the only movie-oriented cable channel to devote its programming entirely to classic films without commercial interruption or content editing.

=== TCM Movie Database (2006–2025) ===
Launched in 2006 as TCMdb, Turner Classic Movies maintained its own comprehensive database of motion picture history. The database included actors, actresses, and film crew (listing more than 1.25 million people, with 15,000 written biographies), and motion picture titles (more than 130,000 titles), not limited to the film libraries that Turner Classic Movies owned, and it included links by which a user could request that Turner Classic Movies schedule any title for viewing. Richard B. Steiner was the creator, architect, and supervisor of the TCM Movie Database. By 2013, the Watch TCM app for iOS, Android, and Blackberry had some database information. Leonard Maltin's reviews were included in the database. Over the years, features such as integrated airdates were removed. Database entries were available until November 2025; articles from the database are still throughout the new website under the Articles section. Beginning in November 2025, TCM.com began directing users to the American Film Institute's Catalog of Feature Films with a prominent link.

=== Corporate restructuring (2019–present) ===
On March 4, 2019, Time Warner's new owner AT&T (who renamed the company WarnerMedia) announced a planned reorganization to effectively dissolve owner Turner Broadcasting System, which involved Cartoon Network, Adult Swim, Turner Classic Movies and digital media company Otter Media being transferred directly under Warner Bros. Entertainment. Aside from Otter, which was transferred to WarnerMedia Entertainment on May 31, 2019 to oversee development of HBO Max, the newly transferred properties came under a newly formed division, Warner Bros. Global Kids, Young Adults and Classics.

On September 1, 2021, TCM introduced a new logo and slogan, "Where Then Meets Now", in the network's first major rebranding since its launch. The rebranding was intended to give the channel a more modern and energetic presentation while continuing to emphasize its commitment to showcasing classic cinema; new branding elements include Technicolor-inspired color schemes, and a new stylized "C" in its wordmark, which resembles a camera lens and symbolizes themes of "curation", "context", "culture" and "connection".

On May 11, 2022, Turner Classic Movies was moved under Warner Bros. Television after the dissolution of the Warner Bros. Global Kids, Young Adults and Classics division by new owner Warner Bros. Discovery.

In March 2023, it was announced that TCM was marking the centennial of Warner Bros., in conjunction with The Film Foundation and the TCM Classic Film Festival. This included special airings of newly-restored Warner Bros. films: Rio Bravo (introduced by Martin Scorsese), and East of Eden (introduced by Wes Anderson and Joanna Hogg).

On June 20, 2023, multiple TCM executives (including executive vice president Pola Changnon, who had been with Turner for over 25 years) were released by the channel's current owner, Warner Bros. Discovery (WBD), as part of layoffs affecting its U.S. Networks division. The network was to be moved under the oversight of Cartoon Network head Michael Ouweleen, and it was reported that there were plans for more synergies and cross-promotion of TCM with the rest of the networks group. The layoffs led to concerns over the future of the channel, with filmmakers Martin Scorsese, Steven Spielberg and Paul Thomas Anderson holding a meeting with WBD CEO David Zaslav to discuss them. They later issued a joint statement, explaining that the channel has been a "precious resource of cinema, open 24 hours a day seven days a week", and had "always been a profitable endeavor".

On June 23, 2023, WBD appointed the Warner Bros. Motion Picture Group's CEOs Michael De Luca and Pamela Abdy as heads of the network, reporting to head of U.S. Networks Kathleen Finch. The pair stated that "We have each spent time talking to Zaslav, separately and together, and it's clear that TCM and classic cinema are very important to him. Our primary aim is to ensure that TCM's programming is untouched and protected." On June 28, it was announced that Scorsese, Spielberg, and Anderson would actively collaborate with De Luca and Abdy on the network's direction; a spokesperson stated that "TCM is not immune to the very real pressure on the entire linear ecosystem, but we have taken steps to ensure that we stay true to the mission of the network — bringing more titles to the air, driving content investment, and preserving and protecting the culture of cinema."

On June 9, 2025, Zaslav announced Warner Bros. Discovery was splitting into two divisions: "Streaming and Studios" and "Global Linear Networks", with the split to be finalized by mid-2026. Zaslav was expected to head the streaming and studios division, while WBD chief financial officer Gunnar Wiedenfels would head the cable division. A month later, it was announced TCM would be placed under a "special custody arrangement" unique from its sister channels. The programming and strategy operations would remain with Zaslav's division, while the channel's distribution and business operations would be placed under Wiedenfel's division. De Luca and Abdy were to remain as the heads of TCM.

In October 2025, Bloomberg reported that David Ellison, the new CEO of Paramount Skydance, had made a $20 per share bid for Warner Bros. Discovery, which was rebuffed for being too low. Later that month, the WBD board of directors placed the studio for sale after receiving "unsolicited interest" from multiple parties, which included Comcast and Netflix. On December 5, 2025, it was announced that Netflix had agreed to acquire the Warner Bros. studio, television and streaming assets (including HBO, HBO Max, and DC Comics) in an $82.7 billion deal, beating out bids from Paramount Skydance and Comcast. The deal was expected to be finalized after the scheduled split of WBD into two companies closed in the third quarter of 2026. That same day, Deadline Hollywood reported that TCM was among the television assets acquired by Netflix, unique from its sister channels that would have formed the Discovery Global spin-off. In January 2026, Netflix disclosed it would acquire the channel as part of the acquisition. The following month however, Netflix exited the deal in favor of Paramount Skydance's acquisition.

On October 6, 2026, Paramount Skydance completed its acquisition of Warner Bros. Discovery. Paramount Skydance Corporation subsequently changed its legal name to the Skydance Corporation. Accordingly, it was announced De Luca and Abdy would exit their positions as co-chairs and co-CEOs when the merger closed. Two days later, on October 8, Deadline Hollywood reported that TCM would fall under the Skydance Motion Picture Group, which is headed by Dana Goldberg and Josh Greenstein. In November 2026, it was reported that Charles Tabesh—who currently serves as TCM's senior vice president of programming—will serve as the senior VP and general manager for TCM as part of the new leadership team announced during the Paramount/Warner Bros. studio reorganization.

=== Now Playing ===
Turner Classic Movies formerly published Now Playing, a monthly program guide, originally available through a standalone subscription, which provided daily listings and descriptions for films scheduled to air on Turner Classic Movies in the coming month. The digest-size magazine highlighted a featured actor on the cover, and featured essays about the "guest programmer" as well as a movie-and-actor themed crossword puzzle. After Robert Osborne died, the May 2017 issue contained a commemoration titled "Remembering Robert Osborne" by Ben Mankiewicz.

Turner Classic Movies ceased print publication of Now Playing (which had been one of the few channel-specific program guides that remained in print circulation for most of the 2000s and 2010s) with the August 2017 issue, moving it to an electronic format available via email free of charge.

== Programming ==
=== Movie library ===
Turner Classic Movies' library of films spans several decades of cinema and includes thousands of film titles. Before its launch in April 1994, Turner's film library had included pre-1986 MGM and RKO films, as well as all pre-1948 Warner Bros. films. In August 1993, TCM obtained exclusive rights to 300 films from Paramount Pictures, for a cost of $30 million. In August 1996, TCM obtained an exclusive, three-year licensing deal to 36 films from Sony Pictures Entertainment (primarily film content from Columbia Pictures and TriStar Pictures).

In April 2004, near their 10th anniversary, TCM purchased the television licensing rights to 146 titles from Universal Pictures and Columbia Pictures. In August of the same year, 20th Century Fox agreed to license several classic film titles from their library. In 2014, Walt Disney Studios agreed to license titles from their library, including episodes from their anthology television series. These were aired during the now defunct programming block Treasures From the Disney Vault, hosted by film historian Leonard Maltin.

In January 2026, TCM announced that it would become the "ongoing television home" of 750 Merrie Melodies and Looney Tunes cartoons under a six-year agreement, which would premiere on February 2, 2026, with the inaugural Bugs Bunny cartoon "A Wild Hare". TCM would initially highlight the cartoons by declaring Bugs Bunny as its "Star of the Month", with notable Bugs Bunny cartoons aired alongside film selections inspired by them (such as "Rabbit of Seville" and "What's Opera, Doc?" for A Night at the Opera).

=== Programming blocks ===
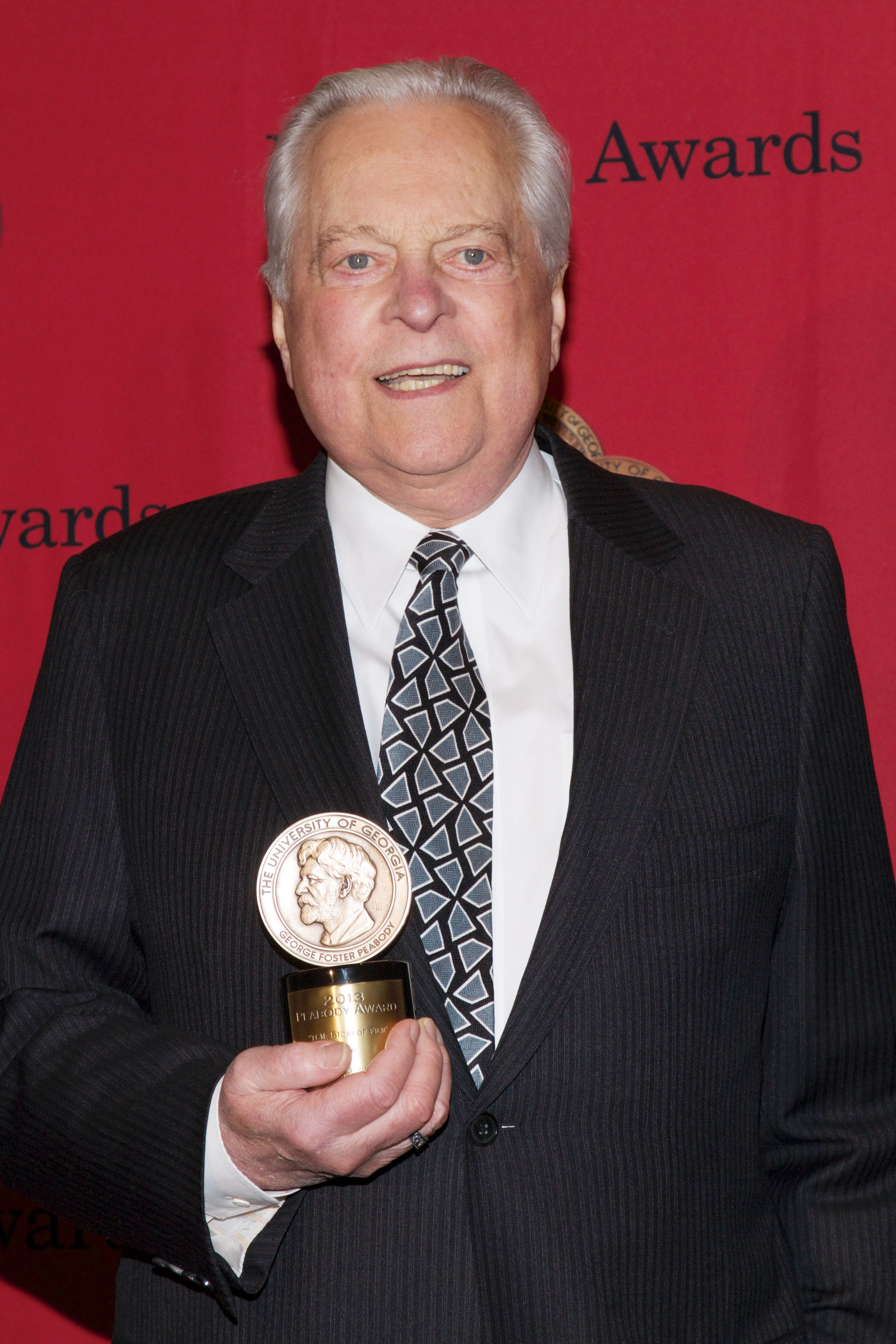
TCM prime time host Robert Osborne at the 73rd Annual Peabody Awards (May 2014)

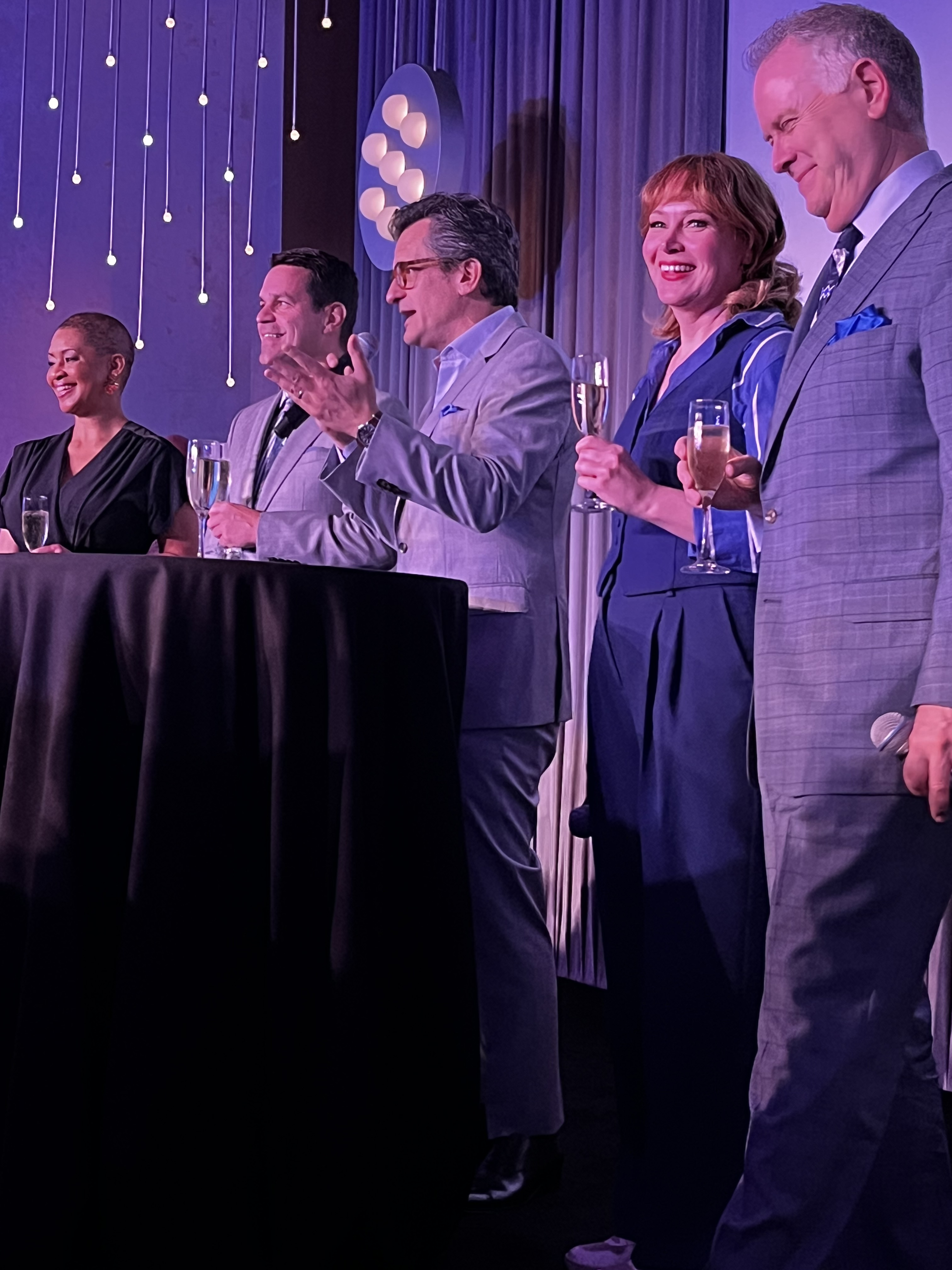
From left to right: Jacqueline Stewart, Dave Karger, Ben Mankiewicz, Alicia Malone, and Eddie Muller at The Hollywood Roosevelt Hotel (April 2024).

Most feature movies shown during the prime time and early overnight hours (8:00 p.m. to 2:30 a.m. Eastern Time) were presented by film historian Robert Osborne. He was the network's first host since its 1994 launch until 2016, except for a five-month medical leave from July to December 2011, when guest hosts presented each night's films. In September 2003, Ben Mankiewicz was hired as the network's daytime weekend host.

In October 2012, Osborne announced he was delegating his on-air appearances over to Mankiewicz, who assumed primetime hosting duties on Fridays by the next year. Osborne nevertheless continued hosting the Private Screenings and The Essentials series.

In January 2014, during his "Noir City" film festival in San Francisco, Eddie Muller announced he had been hired as an on-air host for the network. In May 2016, Tiffany Vasquez, a graduate of NYU Tisch School of the Arts, became the network's first female host, introducing films on Saturday afternoons. She had previously won TCM's 20th Anniversary Ultimate Fan Contest, flying to Atlanta to introduce a film of her choice on-air with Robert Osborne. In January 2018, Vasquez announced on Twitter she had taped her last introductions and her contract was not renewed.

That same year, in 2018, Dave Karger and Alicia Malone were jointly announced as full-time hosts for the network. In September 2019, Jacqueline Stewart became the network's first African-American host.

==== Current ====
- TCM regularly features a Star of the Month, where the most prominent roles of a highlighted actor are featured across multiple nights of programming throughout the month.
- Silent Sunday Nights – A weekend late-night programming block, which broadcasts silent films on Sunday midnights Eastern Time (ET). It debuted on April 17, 1994 with Buster Keaton's The Cameraman (1928). In 2013, Ben Mankiewicz began hosting the block. In September 2019, Jacqueline Stewart became the current host. Two years later, in September 2021, Sibling Rivalry, a New York City-based independent creative agency, designed the latest bumper intro for the block.
- TCM Imports – A weekend late-night programming block, which broadcasts international films which airs on Sunday nights at 2 a.m. ET. It debuted on July 14, 1995 with Ingmar Bergman's Persona (1966) in honor of Bergman's 77th birthday. The block was originally broadcast on Friday nights at 2 a.m. ET. In 2013, Mankiewicz began hosting the block. In March 2019, Alicia Malone became the current host.
- Noir Alley – A weekend programming block of the film noir genre, hosted by Eddie Muller. Since the channel's inception, TCM has had a film noir programming block titled Darkness After Dawn, which aired Sunday mornings at 10 a.m. ET. Rebranded as Noir Alley, it debuted on March 5, 2017 with The Maltese Falcon (1941). It broadcasts on Saturday nights and repeats on Sunday mornings at 10 a.m. ET.
- Musical Matinee – A weekend afternoon programming block on Saturdays, hosted by Dave Karger, which airs musical films. It debuted on November 5, 2022 with Singin' in the Rain (1952).
- Films on Film – A programming block on Friday nights at 8 p.m. ET, hosted by Ben Mankiewicz, which airs documentaries about actors, filmmakers, and cinema history, followed by a curated selection of films. It debuted on September 4, 2026, with the biographical documentary Charles Grodin: Rebel with a Cause, which was followed by films starring Grodin.

==== Limited ====
- TCM Guest Programmer – A programming block in which one of the hosts is joined by a celebrity guest responsible for choosing that evening's films.
- Two for One – A 12-week primetime limited series in which Ben Mankiewicz is joined by a celebrity guest to present and discuss a double feature of their choice. The series premiered on April 6, 2024 at 8 p.m. ET.

==== Seasonal ====
- 31 Days of Oscar – A programming event held during the month prior to the Academy Awards, which highlights themed selections of Academy Award winners and nominees. The 2019 edition featured a theme of prime time double features between competing films, such as "Favorite Swashbuckler" (Zorro vs. Robin Hood), "Creepiest Voyeurism" (Blowup vs. Three Colours: Red), "Best Future Prediction" (Logan's Run vs. 2001: A Space Odyssey), and "Tiebreaker: Hepburn vs. Streisand" (The Lion in Winter vs. Funny Girl).
- Summer of Darkness – A programming block of noir films that airs every Friday in June and July, presented by Eddie Muller. It debuted on June 5, 2015, airing 24 hours each Friday of exclusively noir films. Most notably, it premiered newly-restored editions of Woman on the Run (1950) and Too Late for Tears (1949). The block returned in June 2026, with Muller presenting his curated list of essential noir films.
- Summer Romance – A summer-long weekend block of one selected romantic film each Sunday afternoon, presented by Alicia Malone. It debuted on June 1, 2025 with An Affair to Remember (1957). In August, the block overlaps with Summer Under the Stars.
- Summer Under the Stars – A month-long programming block in August which devotes an entire daily schedule to the filmography of a particular actor. It debuted in August 2003.
- Creepy Cinema – A Halloween-themed prime time programming block in October, featuring Ben Mankiewicz and actor and comedian Mario Cantone presenting a double feature of horror and thriller films. It debuted in October 2022.

==== Defunct ====
- Syncopation Station – A weekend double feature of dance-centric musical and romantic films from the Golden Age of Hollywood. It initially aired on Saturday mornings at 11 a.m. ET. By 1998, it was moved to Saturday afternoon at 3 p.m. ET.
- Make 'Em Laugh – A weekend block of classic Hollywood comedies which aired on Saturday afternoons at 5 p.m. ET.
- Lone Star Cinema – A weekend programming block of the Western film genre. It debuted in April 1996 and regularly aired on Saturday afternoons at 3 p.m. ET. By 1998, it was moved to Saturday mornings at 11 a.m. ET.
- Affairs to Remember – A weekday afternoon programming block of romance films that aired at 4 p.m. ET.
- Funday Night at the Movies – A programming block hosted by actor Tom Kenny (best known as the voice of SpongeBob SquarePants) during the summer of 2007. This block featured classic feature films (such as The Wizard of Oz, Sounder, Bringing Up Baby, Singin' in the Rain, Mr. Smith Goes to Washington, The Adventures of Robin Hood, and 20,000 Leagues Under the Sea) aimed at introducing these movies to child audiences and their families. It was later replaced by Essentials Jr., a youth-oriented version of its weekly series, The Essentials, and hosted by Bill Hader.
- Treasures from the Disney Vault – A block hosted by Leonard Maltin, which showcased a compilation of vintage Disney feature films, cartoons, documentaries, episodes of Disney's anthology television series, and episodes of The Mickey Mouse Club. It debuted on December 21, 2014. The last scheduled program aired on September 2, 2019 due to the launch of Disney+ in November of that year.
- The Essentials – A weekend primetime series in which a certain film is discussed for its artistic, cultural, and historical significance. Originally hosted by Rob Reiner, it debuted on April 1, 2001 at 6 p.m. ET. In 2006, it was reformatted with Robert Osborne in conversation with a guest host for each season until 2015. Following Osborne's death, in 2017, Alec Baldwin was named as the new host. The series' last season was with Ben Mankiewicz and filmmaker Brad Bird in 2020.
- TCM Underground – A weekend late-night block which focused on cult films. It debuted on October 13, 2006 and was originally hosted by industrial rock/heavy metal musician and filmmaker Rob Zombie. In February 2023, the block was cancelled after its programmer, Millie De Chirico, was laid off from the network.

=== Documentaries ===
In addition to films, Turner Classic Movies also airs original content, mostly documentaries about classic movie personalities, the world of filmmaking and particularly notable films. An occasional month-long series, Race and Hollywood, showcases films by and about people of non-white races, featuring discussions of how these pictures influenced white people's image of said races, as well as how people of those races viewed themselves.

Previous installments have included "Asian Images on Film" in 2008, "Native American Images on Film" in 2010, "Black Images on Film" in 2006 "Latino Images on Film" in 2009 and "Arab Images on Film" in 2011. The network aired the film series Screened Out (which explored the history and depiction of homosexuality in film) in 2007 and Religion on Film (focusing on the role of religion in cinematic works) in 2005. In 2011, TCM debuted a new series entitled AFI's Master Class: The Art of Collaboration.

=== TCM Remembers ===
Many films shown on Turner Classic Movies were made during the Golden Age of Hollywood, an era with few survivors. In December 1994, Turner Classic Movies debuted "TCM Remembers", a tribute to recently deceased film personalities (including actors, producers, composers, directors, writers, and cinematographers) which occasionally airs during promotional breaks between films. The segments appear in two forms: individual tributes and a longer end-of-year compilation. Following the recent death of an especially famous film personality (usually an actor or filmmaker), the segment will feature a montage of select shots of the deceased's work.

Every mid-December, a more inclusive TCM Remembers interstitial is produced, featuring a selection of clips interspersed with scenes from settings such as an abandoned drive-in (2012) or a theatre which is closing down (2013). Since 2001, most of the soundtracks for these have been introspective melodies by indie artists such as Badly Drawn Boy (2007) or Steve Earle (2009). 2015's song, "Quickly Now", was written especially for TCM Remembers by Chuck Moore and Reid Hall, and sung by Eryn McHugh.

==== TCM Remembers soundtracks ====
| Year | Artist | Song |
|---|---|---|
| 2002 | Rickie Lee Jones | "Cycles" |
| 2003 | Sarah McLachlan | "I Will Remember You" |
| 2004 | Ryan Adams | "Goodnight, Hollywood Blvd." |
| 2005 | Joe Henry | "Flesh and Blood" |
| 2006 | Robinella | "Press On" |
| 2007 | Badly Drawn Boy | "Promises" |
| 2008 | Joe Henry | "God Only Knows" |
| 2009 | Steve Earle | "To Live is To Fly" |
| 2010 | Sophie Hunger | "Headlights" |
| 2011 | OK Sweetheart | "Before You Go" |
| 2012 | M83 | "Wait" |
| 2013 | Sleeping at Last | "In the Embers" |
| 2014 | Kodaline | "All I Want" |
| 2015 | Eryn McHugh | "Quickly Now" |
| 2016 | Dan Auerbach | "Goin' Home" |
| 2017 | The Cardigans | "Lead Me Into The Night" |
| 2018 | Lord Huron | "When the Night is Over" |
| 2019 | Alice Boman | "Waiting" |
| 2020 | Prisca Strother & Tunewelders | "Stopping by Woods on a Snowy Evening" |
| 2021 | Reuben and the Dark & AG | "Shiny Happy People" (a song originally performed by R.E.M.) |
| 2022 | Lord Huron | "The Night We Met" |
| 2023 | AG and Christina Perri | "Learning to Fly" (a song originally performed by Tom Petty and the Heartbreakers) |
| 2024 | Birdtalker | "Life's a Trip" |
| 2025 | Dave Simonett and the Sunrise | "In the Western Wind and the Sunrise" |

== Accolades ==
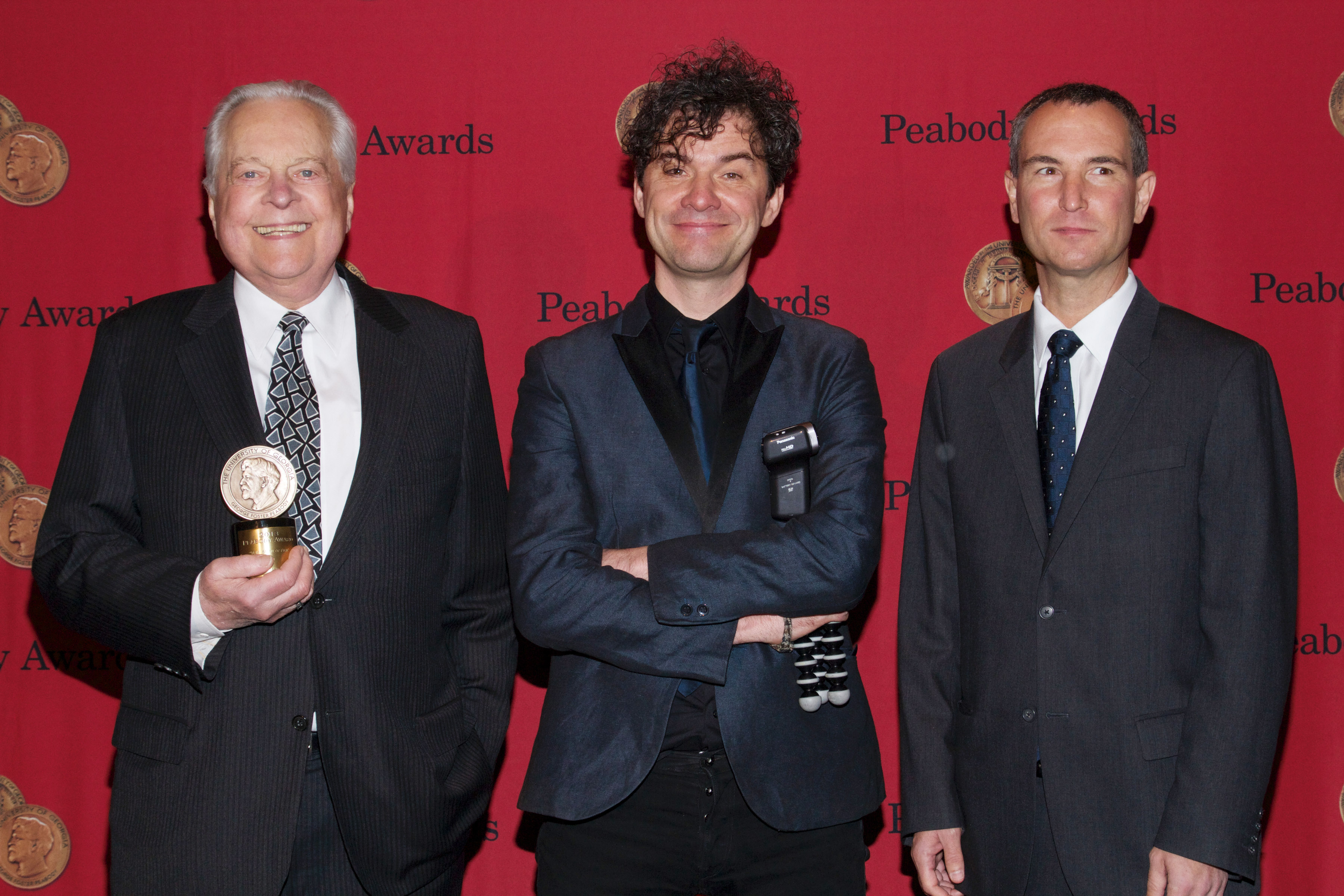
Robert Osborne, Mark Cousins and Charles Tabesh in 2014, with the Peabody Award that Turner Classic Movies received for its presentation of The Story of Film: An Odyssey

Turner Classic Movies received a 2008 Peabody Award for its dedication to film preservation and "a continuing, powerful commitment to a central concept—the place of film in social and cultural experience".

Turner Classic Movies received a 2013 Peabody Award for its presentation of Mark Cousins' The Story of Film: An Odyssey, a 15-episode documentary about the development and advancement of the medium of motion pictures. Drawing on its exhaustive film library, Turner Classic Movies complemented each episode with short films and feature films from the familiar to the little-seen. The Peabody Award praised Turner Classic Movies' The Story of Film "for its inclusive, uniquely annotated survey of world cinema history".

== Streaming ==
In April 2016, TCM announced it had partnered with The Criterion Collection to create a subscription streaming service called FilmStruck. The service included a curated selection of more than 1,000 classic Hollywood, international, arthouse and independent films, including those from the Janus Films and Kino libraries. FilmStruck was launched on November 1, 2016, and included exclusive bonus content such as hosted introductions, interviews and rare media. In November 2018, FilmStruck was shut down by WarnerMedia, under the ownership of AT&T, to streamline business operations.

TCM has been associated with its parent company Warner Bros. Discovery's HBO Max streaming service since its 2020 launch. TCM has its own category hub on the service with a curated selection of classic films.

== Merchandising and events ==
=== TCM Vault Collection ===
The TCM Vault Collection consists of several different DVD collections of rare classic films that have been licensed, remastered and released by Turner Classic Movies (through corporate sister Warner Bros. Home Entertainment). These boxed set releases are of films by notable actors, directors or studios that were previously unreleased on DVD or VHS. The sets often include bonus discs including documentaries and shorts from the Turner Classic Movies library. The initial batch of DVDs are printed in limited quantities and subsequent batches are made-on-demand (MOD).

- Universal Collection – Featuring films licensed by Turner Classic Movies from the Universal Pictures vault.
- The Lost RKO Collection – Featuring RKO films from the 1930s.
- TCM Spotlight – A series of DVD box sets released by Warner Home Video featuring Charlie Chan and stars such as Esther Williams, Errol Flynn, Jean Arthur, Deanna Durbin, and Doris Day.

=== TCM Wine Club ===
In October 2015, Turner Classic Movies launched the TCM Wine Club, a new venture which curates wines as inspired by classic Hollywood films. They partnered with Laithwaites, a direct-to-consumer wine distributor and retailer, as well as Wines That Rock, a pop culture wine company, to provide a line of mail-order wines from famous vineyards. As part of their inaugural offer, TCM curated fifteen special wine bottles, including the first-ever release of Cafe Zoetrope, a custom-crafted red from Francis Ford Coppola's winery. Wines are available in a three-month subscription and can be selected as reds, whites, or a mixture of both.

=== TCM Young Composers Film Competition ===
In 2000, Turner Classic Movies started an annual Young Composers Film Competition, inviting aspiring composers to participate in a judged competition that offers the winner of each year's competition the opportunity to score a restored, feature-length silent film as a grand prize, mentored by a well-known composer, with the new work subsequently premiering on the network. As of 2006, films that have been rescored include the 1921 Rudolph Valentino film Camille, two Lon Chaney films: 1921's The Ace of Hearts and 1928's Laugh, Clown, Laugh, and Greta Garbo's 1926 film The Temptress.

=== TCM Classic Film Festival ===
In April 2010, Turner Classic Movies launched their first Classic Film Festival, an event—now held annually—at the Grauman's Chinese Theatre and the Grauman's Egyptian Theatre on Hollywood Boulevard. The Hollywood Roosevelt Hotel serves as the festival's key venue for special events. Initially hosted by Robert Osborne, the four-day festival features celebrity appearances, special events, and screenings of around 50 classic films, including several newly-restored films by The Film Foundation, an organization devoted to preserving Hollywood's classic film legacy.

The Classic Film Festival was cancelled in 2020 due to the COVID-19 pandemic and was moved to a virtual setting, billed as the "Special Home Edition". In 2021, the festival was cancelled again as a live event, and continued its virtual setting. In 2022, the festival returned to its live setting, with its theme being "All Together Now: Back to the Big Screen." A year later, the festival celebrated the centennial anniversary of Warner Bros. launching with the premiere of a newly-restored edition of Rio Bravo (1959).

=== TCM Classic Cruise ===
In 2011, TCM launched its inaugural Classic Cruise event, first aboard the Celebrity Millennium cruise ship traveling from Miami to Key West and Cozumel. In 2013, the Classic Cruise held its maiden voyage aboard the Disney Magic for the first time. In 2016, the cruise instead used the Disney Fantasy, which holds 4,000 passengers compared to the Magic's 2,700-passenger accommodation. In 2019, the Classic Cruise returned from a three-year absence aboard the Disney Magic, sailing from New York to Bermuda.

== International versions ==
Turner Classic Movies is available in many other countries around the world. In Canada, Turner Classic Movies began to be carried on Shaw Cable and satellite provider Shaw Direct in 2005. Rogers Cable started offering Turner Classic Movies in December 2006 as a free preview for subscribers of its digital cable tier and was added to its analogue tier in February 2007. While the schedule for the Canadian feed is generally the same as that of the American network, some films are replaced for broadcast in Canada due to rights issues and other reasons.

Other versions of Turner Classic Movies are currently available in France, French-speaking Switzerland, French-speaking Belgium and Spain. The channel also used to be available in the United Kingdom, Republic of Ireland, Malta, the Middle East, Africa, Greece, Cyprus, Asia-Pacific, Latin America and Nordic countries. The UK version in particular operated two channels, including a spinoff called Turner Classic Movies 2. TCM UK ceased operations on 6 July 2023.

== See also ==
- The Great Movie Ride – a former attraction at Disney's Hollywood Studios that was sponsored by Turner Classic Movies.
- Turner Classic Movies 2 – A defunct sister network to the UK & Ireland version of Turner Classic Movies.
- Movies! – an American digital multicast television network owned and operated by Weigel Broadcasting, specializing in classic feature films.
- The Film Detective – an American internet television service specializing in restored seldom-seen titles.
- Family Movie Classics – an American cable and satellite television network operated by Family Broadcasting Corporation.
