= Billy Contreras =

American musician (born 1984)

- Born: December 17, 1984 (age 41); St. Joseph, Michigan, U.S.
- Genres: jazz, bluegrass, country, blues, Western swing, rock, jam, nu jazz
- Occupations: Musician, composer, teacher
- Instruments: Violin, mandolin, guitar, piano, bass
- Years active: 1997–present
- Labels: Columbia Records, Compass Records, COJAZZ

Billy Contreras (born December 17, 1984) is an American jazz violinist and bluegrass fiddler, multi-instrumentalist, session player and educator.

== Early life ==
Born in St. Joseph, Michigan to parents of mixed American and Mexican ancestry, Billy Jarrett Contreras moved to Franklin, Tennessee with his family at the age of five. When he was six years old, Contreras attended a local fiddle contest and was encouraged to study violin using the Suzuki method.

Billy was inspired early in his childhood by fiddler Charlie Daniels after having seen him perform "The Devil Went Down to Georgia" on Country Music Television (the two would play together in 2017). He then studied for a year and a half with Nashville fiddler Jim Wood, who introduced Billy to fiddle tunes and their colorful histories.

When he was eight years old, Contreras began studying with legendary Nashville session violinist Buddy Spicher, who taught him about Western swing music and familiarized the musician with jazz standards at a young age.

== Musical career ==
=== 1994-2001: Early Career in Nashville ===
Buddy Spicher and the Nashville Swing Band

At the age of ten Billy joined Buddy Spicher's Nashville Swing Band, with Contreras and Spicher becoming regulars at Wolfy's in Downtown Nashville. After playing with Spicher for six years, the pair perfected a harmonically dense twin fiddling style characterized by double-stops and triple-stops played on each instrument, creating four to six-voice chords.

First Fiddling Awards, Jazz Festivals, First Album

When he was 12 years old Contreras won the National Oldtime Fiddlers' Contest in Weiser, Idaho for his age division.

Contreras was a featured performer at the Lionel Hampton Jazz Festival in Idaho in 1998 and 1999, the latter date including a performance with an all-star lineup including Hampton, pianist Hank Jones, guitarist Herb Ellis and trumpeter Roy Hargrove. He also played at the festival in 2000 and 2001. In the late 1990s Contreras also worked extensively with The Texas Playboys, performed with country star Hank Thompson, and played in Lionel Hampton's big band at the Chet Atkins Musicians Days Festival.

In the liner notes of Contreras' first LP as a leader, Wild Fiddler, jazz violinist and fiddle master Mark O'Connor observes: “He’s a natural musician, playing with ease the ideas he collects as he encounters new musical influences.”

Study with Rachel Barton Pine

From 1998-2000 Contreras studied with noted American classical violinist Rachel Barton Pine in Chicago, where he flew up for lessons from Tennessee every other weekend.

Better Carter's Jazz Ahead

Billy was selected for the Betty Carter Jazz Ahead international residency program in 1999, 2000 and 2001, which helps in "discovering and presenting the next generation of jazz greats."

=== 2001-2019: Mid Career ===
University of Miami Frost School of Music

After completing his sophomore year of high school in 2001, Contreras was accepted early into the University of Miami Frost School of Music on a full scholarship. During his time in Miami, Contreras recorded as a featured soloist on two electro-acoustic nu jazz albums produced by fellow student Scott Routenberg—Lots of Pulp and Jazztronicus. He also performed the premiere of composer Maria Schneider's Grammy Award nominated "Three Romances" with the University of Miami's Concert Jazz Band, an extended work commissioned by the ensemble.

Freelancing and Nashville Session Player

Contreras then moved back to Nashville, where he made a reputation as a freelance violinist and session player, appearing with such names as George Jones, Doc Severinsen, Hank Thompson, Hank Williams III and Crystal Gayle. Contreras has also performed with the Nashville Symphony and has played the Bridgestone Arena, the Ryman Auditorium and The Kennedy Center.

On April 21, 2018, Contreras was featured as a guest artist on Live from Here with Chris Thile in New York City.

Columbia Records, Robinella and the CC String Band, The Black Lillies

In 2003 Billy recorded the album Robinella and the CC String Band on Columbia Records with his brother, mandolinist Cruz Contreras and his sister-in-law Robinella. Contreras subsequently toured with the band and performed on NBC's Late Night with Conan O'Brien, the Bonnaroo Music Festival and the Grand Ole Opry. The band, based in Knoxville, Tennessee, won the regional "Best Bluegrass Group" four years in a row.

As a recording member of his brother Cruz's band The Black Lillies, Billy performed on Whiskey Angel.

Jazz Violin Albums with Christian Howes

Billy has collaborated with fellow jazz violinist Christian Howes on two all-string band albums, Jazz Fiddle Revolution (2004) and Jazz Fiddle Evolution (2009), both of which showcase Contreras' technical virtuosity, twin fiddle showmanship, jazz improvisation, modern jazz string effects like "The Chop," and arranging skills.

Nashville Grand Master Fiddler Championship, Belmont University and Mark O'Connor Fiddle Camps;

In 2005 and 2017 Contreras won third place in the Nashville Grand Master Fiddler Championship; he placed fourth in the competition in 2018.

Billy Contreras has spent some time as an Adjunct Faculty Member at Belmont University School of Music in Nashville, teaching jazz violin; it is not quite clear whether he still serves or not. But it is clear that he is currently serving with Ricky Skaggs' Kentucky Thunder band, having joined in 2021 after the previous fiddler suffered a stroke. He won a Canadian Covenant Award in 2017 and was nominated for a GMA Dove Award in 2013.

At the age of 16 Contreras began teaching at the Mark O'Connor Fiddle Camp in Nashville, where he was a regular teacher at the camps until 2014.

Contreras is a D'Addario Orchestral Independent Artist.

== Style and influence ==
Contreras is known primarily for playing in the styles of jazz, bluegrass, Western swing and country.

Contreras' harmonic approach to the instrument has influenced several contemporary jazz violinists, including Christian Howes, who calls Contreras a "huge influence" who plays the violin "the way a piano player plays the piano."

Contreras enjoys the looseness and fluidity of non-classical genres: “Jazz playing is a lot freer; you don’t have to stick to the song’s melody as much. When you’re doing classical, they want you to do it right by the book. Bluegrass and country, you can also play a lot more fluid runs, more smooth melodies, while in jazz you have more variations in styles, breaks, and tempo.”

== Selected discography ==
- My Bluegrass Heart with Béla Fleck (2021, Renew Records)
- You Don't Know Me: Classic Country with Crystal Gayle (2019, The Orchard-Southpaw)
- By Request: Buddy Spicher & Billy Contreras (2014, Fiddlehouse Records)
- A Fiendish Threat with Hank Williams III (2013, Megaforce)
- Brothers of the 4X4 with Hank Williams III (2013, Megaforce)
- Ghost to a Ghost/Gutter Town with Hank Williams III (2011, Megaforce)
- South of Nashville with Honky Tonk Hustlas (2011, Independent)
- Rebel Within with Hank Williams III (2010, Curb Records)
- Whiskey Angel with The Black Lillies (2009, Independent)
- Jazz Fiddle Evolution with Christian Howes (2009, COJAZZ)
- Solace for the Lonely with Robinella (2006, DualTone Records)
- Jazztronicus with Scott Routenberg (2006, Independent)
- Burning in the Sun with Blue Merle (2005, Island Records)
- Jazz Fiddle Revolution with Christian Howes (2004, COJAZZ)
- Robinella and the CC String Band with Robinella and Cruz Contreras (2003, Columbia Records)
- Lots of Pulp with Scott Routenberg (2003, Independent)
- Blanket for My Soul with Robinella and the CC String Band (2002, Big Gulley Records)
- No Saint, No Prize with Robinella and the CC String Band (2001, Big Gulley Records)
- Ying-Yang with Victor Wooten (1999, Compass Records)
- Real Thing with Hank Thompson (1997)
- Texas in My Soul (1997, sophomore release as a leader)
- Wild Fiddler (debut LP as leader)
