= Dave Karger =

American television host and author (born 1973)

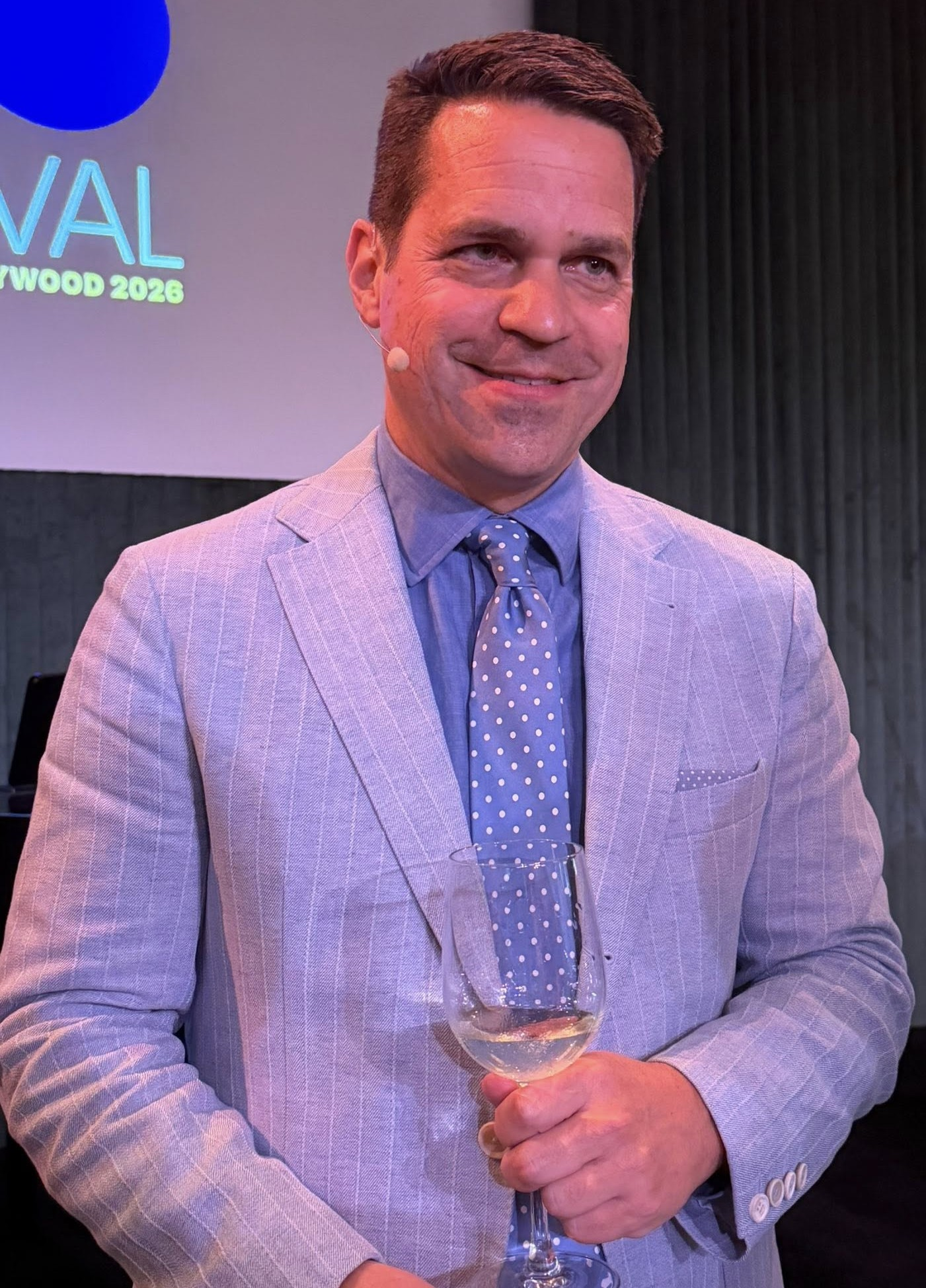
- Karger in 2026
- Born: April 4, 1973 (age 53); Yorktown, New York, U.S.
- Education: Duke University (BA)
- Occupations: Television host; entertainment journalist; author
- Years active: 1995–present
- Employers: Entertainment Weekly (1995–2012); Fandango Media (2012–2016); Warner Bros. Discovery (2018–2026); Skydance Corporation (2026–present)
- Partner: Terry Clark

Dave Karger (born April 4, 1973) is an American author, entertainment journalist, and television host for Turner Classic Movies (TCM). A recipient of the 2015 Publicists Guild Press Award, the entertainment website TheWrap has called him "this generation's mass-media cinematic ambassador".

A graduate of Duke University, Karger was hired as an entertainment journalist for Entertainment Weekly, whereby he interviewed celebrities, wrote news stories and covered the Academy Awards. In 2012, he left Entertainment Weekly and joined Fandango Media as a correspondent. There, he hosted two online web series: Weekend Ticket and The Frontrunners. Meanwhile, he was hired by the Academy of Motion Picture Arts and Sciences (AMPAS) to be their third official red carpet greeter on Oscar night, a position previously held by Army Archerd and Robert Osborne, the host of Turner Classic Movies.

In 2007, Karger appeared with Osborne to co-host a primetime lineup of Best Picture-winning films. In 2016, Osborne became ill, and Karger was selected as a guest host. Within two years, in 2018, Karger was hired as a full-time host for TCM, and currently hosts the Musical Matinee programming block on Saturday afternoons. In 2024, Karger wrote his debut non-fiction book 50 Oscar Nights.

== Early life ==
Karger was born on April 4, 1973, in Yorktown, New York, within Westchester County, to Tom and Mary Jane "MJ" Karger. Karger's father was employed with the Fresh Air Fund, a 501(c)(3) nonprofit organization helping underprivileged children in New York. His mother serves as the co-chair for the GLSEN Hudson Valley Chapter, a nonprofit national education organization. At eleven years old, in 1985, Karger watched his first Academy Awards ceremony. He remembered the documentary The Times of Harvey Milk (1984) winning the Academy Award for Best Documentary Feature.

A self-described "child of the 80s", Karger grew up watching films directed by John Hughes. In 1991, he began attending Duke University as an English major. There, he discovered classic cinema after he enrolled in an elective film course called "Hollywood Film Music," which included a screening of the 1944 film noir, Laura.

Karger deeply admired the film, including the instrumental score by David Raksin. He stated, "His score for Laura really turned me on to classic film music, and film scores in general." He later told his parents about the course, to which he remembered: "They told me years later that they thought I was absolutely crazy and asked themselves why they were paying all this money for my Duke tuition." In 1995, Karger graduated cum laude with dual degrees in English and psychology.

== Career ==
=== 1995–2016: Entertainment journalist ===
In 1994, he was hired by Entertainment Weekly as an intern. He was eventually promoted to senior writer, publishing over 50 cover stories for the magazine. In 2000, he began appearing on the Today show as an "entertainment expert", discussing the Academy Awards and weekend box office numbers. In 2011, he began serving as the Academy's official red carpet greeter on Oscar night, appearing on E!'s Live from the Red Carpet and ABC's Countdown to the Oscars. By this time, he became the third person to hold the position. The previous two were Variety columnist Army Archerd and Robert Osborne, the host of Turner Classic Movies (TCM). The 2011 online broadcast, known as the Oscar Digital Experience, was awarded the Primetime Emmy Award for Outstanding Creative Achievement in Interactive Media. Karger retained the position a year later until he was replaced by Chris Connelly in 2013.

In 2010, Karger moved to Los Angeles; there, his Entertainment Weekly colleague Sean Smith left his position as the moderator for the Santa Barbara International Film Festival's (SBIFF) Virtuosos discussion panel to join the Peace Corps in Africa. Karger replaced Smith as the new moderator, and continues to host the ceremony. In 2015, Karger was the recipient of the Publicists Guild Press Award honoring the year's outstanding entertainment journalist.

In September 2012, Karger left Entertainment Weekly and joined Fandango Media as a chief correspondent, and made appearances on Today, Access Hollywood, and E! Entertainment. He also hosted the online web series Weekend Ticket and The Frontrunners, the latter of which was nominated for Best Variety & Reality Series at the 2013 Webby Awards. In 2016, Karger left Fandango Media. Karger told The Hollywood Reporter: "After a fantastic three and a half years launching original video content at Fandango, the time was right to try something new."

=== 2018–present: Turner Classic Movies ===
In 2007, Karger made his first appearance on Turner Classic Movies, co-hosting a marathon of Best Picture-winning films with Robert Osborne. In 2016, he began guest hosting for the network when Osborne became ill. With Osborne's blessing, he introduced a marathon block of Olivia de Havilland's films on her centennial birthday. In 2018, Karger and Alicia Malone were jointly announced as full-time hosts for the network, in which he made his official hosting appearance on March 5.

In an interview, Karger stated he had wanted to host his own weekly programming block as most of his TCM colleagues do, thus he "pitched a number of ideas to the TCM folks. And the one that they came back liking the most was this idea of a weekly musical." In 2022, Karger began hosting the Musical Matinee programming block with its broadcast of Singin' in the Rain (1952), debuting on November 5. As of 2026, he hosts the primetime lineup on Mondays and the afternoon lineup on Saturdays.

Karger (left) in conversation with Jason Bateman in 2026

In 2024, Karger published his first book 50 Oscar Nights. In an interview with The Desert Sun, he explained, "I came up with this concept of 50 Oscar Nights because I thought it would be a different type of Academy Awards book, and also because I thought it would be fun to do." For the book, he interviewed 50 past Academy Award winners from the past 60 years, detailing how they prepared, how they were feeling throughout the ceremony and what they did to celebrate their wins.

In 2026, Karger published his second book 50 Movie Nights, featuring interviews with celebrities about favorite films. On September 18, Karger promoted his book at the Academy Museum of Motion Pictures in conversation with Jason Bateman before a screening of The King of Comedy (1983).

== Personal life ==
In 1997, Karger came out as openly gay; in 2014, he was named as one of Out magazine's "Out100". His partner is Terry Clark. He has multiple residences in Palm Springs, California; Los Angeles and New York.

== Publications ==
- 50 Oscar Nights: Iconic Stars & Filmmakers on Their Career-Defining Wins. Running Press. 2024. ISBN 978-0-762-48633-5.
- 50 Movie Nights: Contemporary Stars on Their Favorite Classic Films. Running Press. 2026. ISBN 979-8-894-14221-0.
