= The Black Lillies =

Americana band from Knoxville, Tennessee

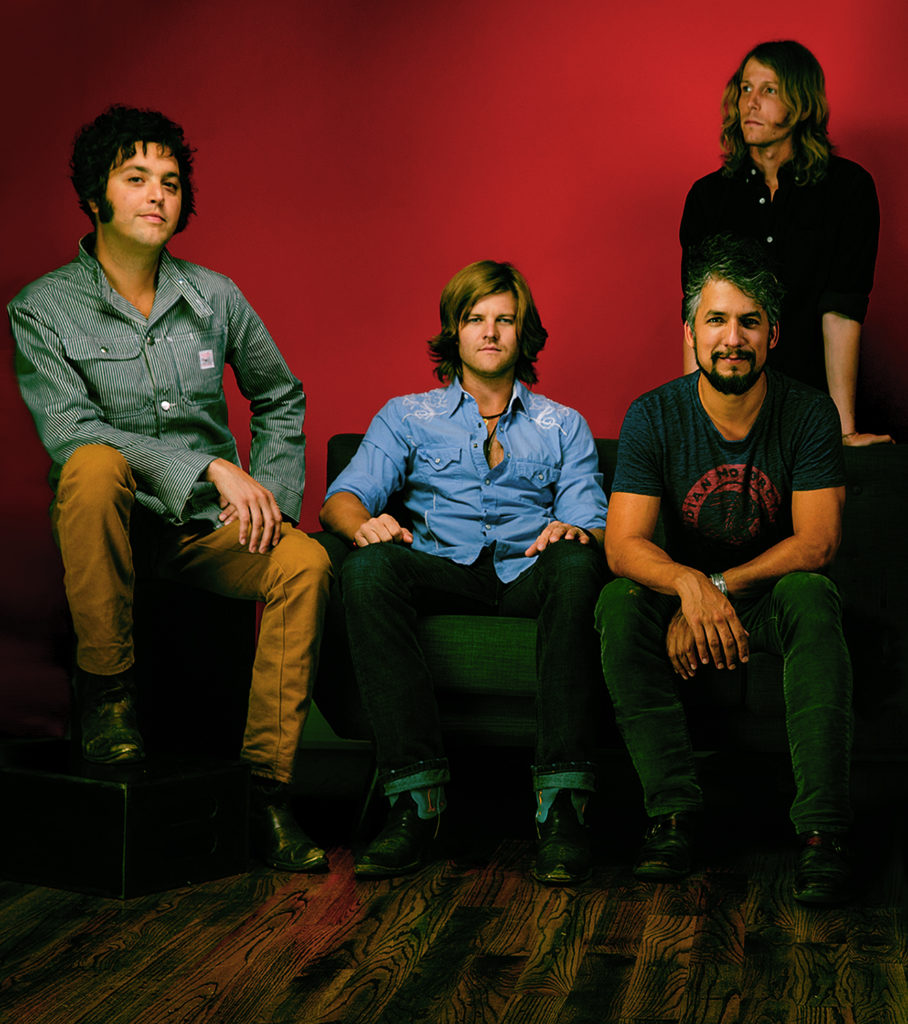
- From left to right: Sam Quinn, Dustin Schaefer, Cruz Contreras, Bowman Townsend

Background information
- Origin: Knoxville, Tennessee, United States
- Genres: Americana, blues, country, folk
- Years active: 2009–2019
- Members: Cruz Contreras; Bowman Townsend; Sam Quinn; Dustin Schaefer
- Past members: Trisha Gene Brady; Mike Seal; Tom Pryor; Robert Richards; Jamie Cook; Taylor Coker; Leah Gardner; Haley Cole; Jonathan Keeney; Jeff Woods; Billy Contreras; Graham Mallany
- Website: theblacklillies.com

The Black Lillies were an Americana band from Knoxville, Tennessee, founded in early 2009 by Cruz Contreras (formerly of Robinella and the CCstringband). They toured actively from 2009 until their final performance on December 31, 2019.

The lineup for their 2018 studio album, Stranger to Me, included Cruz Contreras on lead vocals, guitar, and keys; Sam Quinn (formerly of The Everybodyfields) on bass and vocals; Bowman Townsend on drums; and Dustin Schaefer on electric guitar and vocals.

== Background ==
The band's debut album, Whiskey Angel, was recorded in Cruz's living room and released in April 2009. It featured Billy Contreras on fiddle, Taylor Coker on bass, and Leah Gardner on backing vocals. Contreras wrote and arranged all of the songs on the album. It is personal material, covering the fallout of his divorce from Robinella and the break up of the band they shared. The album resonated strongly with listeners, and Whiskey Angel was ranked in several 'Best of 2009' lists in publications across the country. After Whiskey Angel, they released their album, Black Lillies.

The Black Lillies made an immediate impact on Knoxville's growing music scene and the band was selected to play the Bonnaroo Music & Arts Festival within weeks of releasing the album. They quickly signed a management and booking deal with Chyna Brackeen of Attack Monkey Productions and in October of that year, they launched their first national tour. The tour kicked off at the Ryman Auditorium and the band played 38 shows in 40 days. Two additional national tours took place in 2010 and included appearances at festivals including Bristol's Rhythm & Roots Reunion, Pickathon, Four Corners Folk Festival, Pagosa Folk & Bluegrass, and Rhythm & Blooms. The band has been ranked as the "Best Americana Band" in the Metro Pulse Best of Knoxville poll every year since their inception. They have appeared multiple times on live radio shows including The Grand Ole Opry, NPR's Mountain Stage, WDVX's Tennessee Shines and Music City Roots. In 2010, they were the first band selected and announced to participate in the Americana Music Association's Festival & Conference - their selection was announced two months prior to the rest of the line up. They have since returned several times.

In January 2010, their album Whiskey Angel was nominated for The 10th Annual Independent Music Awards for the Americana Album Category. The album was selected to receive the IMA Vox Pop award. "Two Hearts Down" was awarded the 2012 Independent Music Award for Best Story Song. 100 Miles of Wreckage was also a nominee for Americana Album of the Year. "Same Mistakes" was voted No. 4 on CMT's Pure 12-Pack Countdown From Week of November 9, 2012

In early 2010, the Lillies announced that they were beginning work on a new album. The project was entirely fan-funded via sponsorship packages sold through the band website. The final funds needed were raised through a house concert that drew more than 300 people. The national radio release of the album 100 Miles Of Wreckage was on April 4, 2011. 100 Miles of Wreckage gained national attention and peaked at No. 11 on the Americana radio charts. David McClister selected the album's first track, "Two Hearts Down," as his project. The video was filmed in June 2011 in Nashville. The video made its world premiere on CMT in October 2011 and immediately became a viewer favorite, spending multiple weeks in the "CMT Pure 12 Pack Countdown" including several weeks in the number 2 spot. It was a contender for the top 30 videos of the year on CMT. Additionally, the video aired on networks worldwide including international MTV and VH-1 affiliates, TCN, and PBC.

Additionally, the band was selected to perform at the Country Music Association's Festival & Fan Fair that year. The Black Lillies made their debut performance on the Grand Ole Opry on June 17, 2011. The band was the first independent artist from the Knoxville area to be featured on the Grand Ole Opry, and made history again by being invited back multiple times, appearing five times in just four months. They have since appeared on the show more than 35 times, a record for an independent act.

The Black Lillies' third album, Runaway Freeway Blues, was released in March 2013 to widespread critical acclaim. It debuted at No. 21 on the Billboard Heatseekers chart and No. 43 on the Billboard Top 200 Country chart. It spent more than five months in the Americana Music Association's top five, ending the year as the No. 18 album of the year overall, based on radio airplay. Runaway Freeway Blues was selected by more than two dozen publications (including American Songwriter magazine) as one of the best albums of the year.

On June 13, 2013, the band announced via their website and Facebook page that Jamie Cook, who had been on leave from the band for several weeks already due to a family health matter, would not be returning and that Bowman Townsend, who had been filling in for Cook on tour, would be taking his place full-time.

The band continued to tour in support of Runaway Freeway Blues throughout 2014, including stops at Stagecoach: California's Country Music Festival, Old Settler's Music Festival, Braun Brothers Reunion, Bonnaroo Music & Arts Festival, and more. In summer 2014, Rolling Stone Magazine selected them as one of the hottest up-and-coming acts in country music, calling them "buzzworthy" and describing their style as "genre-mashing roots music with an Appalachian anchor."

In November 2014, The Black Lillies launched a fan funding campaign via PledgeMusic for their fourth studio album, to be recorded in February 2015. The campaign hit 40% of its goal within the first 48 hours of being launched and ultimately raised 122% of the goal. This album will mark the band's first time working with an outside producer. Grammy Award-winning producer/engineer Ryan Hewitt, whose credits include The Avett Brothers, Johnny Cash, Brandi Carlile and the Red Hot Chili Peppers, produced the album, "Hard to Please.".

In early 2015, the band announced the departure of two veteran members, Tom Pryor and Robert Richards. The departure was amicable and both stayed on to complete the winter tour. The remaining Black Lillies (Cruz Contreras, Bowman Townsend, and Trisha Gene Brady) headed into Nashville's House of Blues Studios in February to record their fourth album with Hewitt. They were joined by bass player Bill Reynolds from Band of Horses, pedal steel player Matt Smith (Amy Ray, The Honeycutters) and then-19-year-old Nashville guitar phenom Daniel Donato, whom Cruz had discovered playing at Robert's Western World on Nashville's Lower Broadway.

"Hard to Please" was released October 2, 2015 to immediate critical and fan acclaim. It debuted at No. 12 on Billboard's Heatseekers Chart and No. 30 on Billboard's Top 200 Country Albums Chart. It hit Roots Music Report's radio charts at No. 1, Relix/Jambands radio chart at No. 3 and No/ 4 on the Americana Music Association's radio chart, where it currently reached the top ten. American Songwriter summed it up as "a soulful mix of upbeat Americana and tender ballads," while Vanity Fair noted that "their sound continues to cross generations and musical genres – country, folk, blues and add in a touch of the Dead, for good measure."

Beginning with the release tour for "Hard to Please" the touring band was expanded to a six piece, with players Mike Seal (Jeff Sipe Trio, Larkin Poe), Megan McCormick (Jenny Lewis, Maren Morris, the everybodyfields) and Dustin Schaefer trading parts on electric guitar; Sam Quinn (the everybodyfields) on bass; and Jonathan Keeney (Robinella) on pedal steel.

In October 2016, vocalist Trisha Gene Brady announced that she would be leaving the band to pursue other musical opportunities. Her last show with the band was on Dec 31, 2016 at Knoxville, Tennessee's Mill & Mine.

== Current ==
The quartet spent the majority of 2017 working on new material that builds upon their foundation of strong roots rock and redefines the group's sound, with lush, layered three-part harmonies floating over the funky edge of double electric guitar and keys. Contreras and Quinn, with an occasional assist from Schaefer, have debuted rough sketches of the new material via weekly Facebook Live broadcasts from the road while on tour, dubbed "The Sprinter Sessions."

In January 2018, the group began work with producer Jamie Candiloro (R.E.M., Ryan Adams and the Cardinals, The Eagles) on a new album. Recording took place at Echo Mountain Studios in Asheville, North Carolina. The album, entitled Stranger to Me, will be released fall 2018 on Thirty Tigers.

On January 26, 2020, this was on the Black Lillies website. "After eleven years, five albums, approximately 2000 shows, and countless relationships built along the way, the time has come for us to take a step back from The Black Lillies. This isn’t goodbye – it’s just farewell for now."

== Discography ==
=== Studio albums ===
Title	Details	Peak chart positions	
Title	Details	US Country	US Heat
Whiskey Angel	Release date: May 12, 2009; Label: North Knox Records	—	—
100 Miles of Wreckage	Release date: February 8, 2011; Label: North Knox Records / Attack Monkey	—	—
Runaway Freeway Blues	Release date: March 26, 2013; Label: North Knox Records / Attack Monkey	43	21
Hard to Please	Release date: October 2, 2015; Label: Attack Monkey / Thirty Tigers	30	12
Stranger to Me	Release date: September 28, 2018; Label: Thirty Tigers / The Orchard / Attack Monkey Productions	—	—
"—" denotes releases that did not chart

=== Music videos ===
Year	Title	Director
2011	"Two Hearts Down"	David McClister
2012	"Same Mistakes"	David McClister
2013	"The Fall"	Daniel Cummings
2014	"Smokestack Lady"	Ryan Newman
2018	"Midnight Stranger"	

== Press ==
The Black Lillies: Runaway Road Warriors (American Songwriter)

Q&A: Americana Band the Black Lillies on Recording Without a Label and Being "Jimmy Martin with Tits" (Vanity Fair)

10 Artists You Need to Know: The Black Lillies (Rolling Stone)

Hear The Black Lillies' Funky New 'Hard to Please' (Rolling Stone)

How The Black Lillies Made an Entirely Fan-Funded New Album (Vanity Fair)

== Reviews ==
New Album Review: 100 Miles of Wreckage by the Black Lillies (Hot Hot Music)

The Black Lillies, 100 Miles of Wreckage (the Alternative Root)

Wayne Bledsoe: Black Lillies blooming on 'Wreckage' (Knoxville.com)

The Black Lillies "100 Miles of Wreckage" (Beat Surrender)

The Black Lillies "Runaway Freeway Blues" (American Songwriter)

American Songwriter's Top 50 Albums of 2013: The Black Lillies, Runaway Freeway Blues (American Songwriter)
