= David Staller =

American theatre director and actor

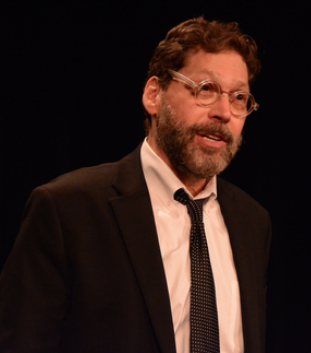
- Born: November 16, 1955 (age 70); Glencoe, Illinois, USA
- Occupations: Actor, Director, Artistic Director of Gingold Theatrical Group
- Years active: 1973–Present
- Partner: Robert Osborne

David Staller (born November 16, 1955) is an American theatre director and actor. He is the founding artistic director of the Off-Broadway theatre company, Gingold Theatrical Group.

== Early life ==
Staller was born in Glencoe, Illinois. He attended the Royal Academy of Dramatic Art, studied acting under Lee Strasberg and Uta Hagen, and studied cello at the University of Southern California.

His godmother was British actress Hermione Gingold. As a tribute to her, Staller named Gingold Theatrical Group after her.

== Stage work ==
As an actor, Staller's appearances on Broadway include Cabaret, where he originated the role of Ernst Ludwig in the 1987 revival, Evita, and Hello, Dolly!

Staller has made over 50 appearances Off-Broadway, including performances in Gas Light, for which he received a Drama League Citation for Distinguished Performer, Mrs. Warren's Profession, The Bald Soprano, and Hay Fever.

Staller became the first person to direct all of George Bernard Shaw's 65 plays, including his last unfinished work, Why She Would Not, wherein Staller commissioned writers Israel Horovitz, David Cote, Michael Feingold, Jeremy McCarter and Robert Simonson to write their own endings to the piece.

Staller has directed ten off-Broadway plays by George Bernard Shaw for Gingold Theatrical Group: The Devil's Disciple (2024), Arms and the Man (2023), Candida (2022), Mrs. Warren's Profession (2021), Caesar and Cleopatra (2019), Heartbreak House (2018), Widowers' Houses (2016), Major Barbara (2014), You Can Never Tell (2013) and Man and Superman (2012). All productions have been filmed by the New York Public Library of Performing Arts at Lincoln Center.

== Writing ==
Staller continues to write, particularly as a script doctor for several film and television production companies. He wrote his own one man show, Noel and Cole, which he performed at multiple venues, including Carnegie Hall. Using an extensive amount of research, Staller has adapted all of George Bernard Shaw's for Gingold Theatrical Group using Shaw's original hand-written manuscripts, letters, production scripts, notes, and in-person interviews with many of those who knew and worked with him including Maurice Evans, Robert Morely, Wendy Hiller, Rex Harrison, Deborah Kerr, and others.

== Gingold Theatrical Group ==
In 2006, Staller founded Gingold Theatrical Group, a New York based theater company that presents works based on George Bernard Shaw's humanitarian precepts. They present monthly script-in-hand performances at New York City’s Symphony Space, produce off-Broadway productions, and partner with several New York educational programs.

Staller has directed performances of all of Bernard Shaw’s 65 plays.

== Other work ==
Staller leads discussions on Shaw and human rights.

Staller does voice-over work, radio and television campaigns, documentaries, and was a voice actor in David Chesky's animated musical film The Mice War.

== Personal life ==
Staller and Robert Osborne, a journalist and host of Turner Classic Movies, were in a relationship for 20 years prior to Osborne's death, in 2017; it was Staller who confirmed Osborne's death to the media.
