= Scott Routenberg =

American composer and jazz pianist

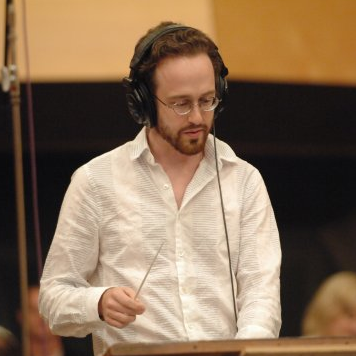

Background information
- Born: 1978 (age 47–48); Atlanta, Georgia, U.S.
- Genres: Jazz, classical, electronica
- Occupations: Composer, musician, arranger, educator
- Instrument: Piano
- Years active: 2000–present
- Labels: EMI Records, Summit Records
- Member of: Scott Routenberg Trio
- Website: ScottRoutenberg.com

Scott Routenberg (born 1978) is an American composer, jazz pianist, arranger and orchestrator. Currently Associate Professor of Jazz Piano at Ball State University in Muncie, Indiana, he has published both full-length compositions for jazz ensembles and several studio albums. His 2003, 2006, and 2020 releases "explore jazz-influenced electro-acoustic hybrids." He has won a number of songwriting contests, including the John Lennon Songwriting Contest Maxell Song of the Year in 2004 for his song "Bandwidth", which also won the JLSC's Grand Prize in the Jazz Category.

Ensembles such as the Metropole Orkest and conductors such as Vince Mendoza have commissioned pieces by Routenberg, and he has performed at international venues such as the Montreaux Jazz Festival and the North Sea Jazz Festival. Stated jazz violinist Christian Howes, "Scott Routenberg is a rare musician with both the experience to play modern jazz piano on the highest level and the discipline to write elegant, long-form symphonic pieces."

== Early life, education ==
Routenberg was born in Atlanta, Georgia in 1978. Raised by his parents in Atlanta, he has some ancestry from Western Ukraine. Routenberg began learning jazz piano at age fifteen after being inspired by his uncle, a vocalist and pianist. Among Routenberg's first jazz piano teachers was the Brazilian bossa nova pianist and bandleader Manfredo Fest. Routenberg attended the University of North Carolina at Chapel Hill starting in 1997, graduating in 2001 with a B.A. in music and communications.

He went on to earn three graduate degrees from 2001 to 2008 at the University of Miami's Frost School of Music. First he worked on his master's degree in jazz piano performance from 2001 to 2003 in the studio of Vince Maggio (a student of pianist Oscar Peterson). Routenberg then earned a Master of Music in media writing and production in 2005, and a Doctor of Musical Arts in jazz composition in 2008. His jazz piano teachers have included Ted Howe, Dr. Scott Warner, Chip Crawford, and Vince Maggio among others. In Miami he studied composition and arranging with Gary Lindsay and Ron Miller. Lindsay was his doctoral advisor, while Routenberg has cited Miller's modal jazz concepts as an influence on his own songwriting. Miller has also taught guitarist Pat Metheny, among others.

His doctoral essay was titled Americana Suite: A Composition for Full Orchestra, Big Band, and Jazz Chamber Ensembles Inspired by American Master Paintings, and was published by the ProQuest Learning Company. He has also authored material for INform Magazine, published by the Indiana Music Educators Association.

== Music career ==
=== 2000-06: Solo albums ===
Shapeshifter (2000)

In 2000 Routenberg released his first solo album, the jazz-themed Shapeshifter. The album was "dedicated to the great Brazilian pianist Manfredo Fest, mentor and friend, who selflessly taught me the timeless art of jazz piano."

Lots of Pulp (2003)

"Lots of Pulp is an excellent ensemble album recorded with fellow Miami students. In it he utilizes hundreds of effects that punctuate his original songs, such as the liquid sound of orange juice being poured into a glass, falling sacks of coins and bell-like tones made by hitting wineglasses with a fork. Routenberg says he hopes to create a more accessible form of jazz, one that can appeal to younger audiences accustomed to electronic music."
— The Island Packet in 2004

His second solo album, Lots of Pulp, was independently released in 2003. Genres include jazz, classical, and electronic, and all tracks were written, arranged, produced, mixed and mastered by Routenberg, with co-writers on some tracks. With respect to instruments Routenberg contributed the found sound sampling, the drum machine, vocal percussion, keyboards, Fender Rhodes, and piano, with guest artists such as Billy Contreras on violin and Patrick Lopez on trumpet. According to The Island Packet in 2004, in Lots of Pulp Routenberg "utilizes hundreds of effects that punctuate his original songs, such as the liquid sound of orange juice being poured into a glass."

"Bandwidth" and Jazztronicus (2006)

In 2004 he won the John Lennon Songwriting Contest Maxell Song of the Year for his song "Bandwidth", which had a programmed drum part hybridized with big band and electronica. It was the first time the award was given to a jazz songwriter. The song also won the JLSC's Grand Prize in the Jazz Category. In the summer of that year he was a Composer Scholar at the Henry Mancini Institute in Los Angeles, studying with composers Vince Mendoza and Jack Smalley.

"Bandwidth" was released as a single by EMI Records in 2005, and later included on Routenberg's full album Jazztronicus. Jazztronicus was released in 2006, and most of the tracks were written and arranged by Routenberg. All the tracks were published by Denmaster Music, excluding "Bandwidth", which had already been published by EMI April Music. Routenberg handled keyboards and programming, with Billy Contreras again on violin and Sofia Kraevska on vocals and co-writing several songs. Spanning both the genres of jazz and electronica, a digital version was released in 2010.

=== 2000-07: First awards ===
Since releasing his first solo album in 2000 he has won or been nominated for a number of awards; for example, he won ASCAP Young Jazz Composer Awards in 2002, 2003, and 2006. In 2003 he won first place in instrumental performance in piano for the Hilton Head Jazz Society Scholarship, and the next year he won The ASCAP Foundation Grant Program for his song "Through Your Eyes." In 2006 he won in the Downbeat Student Music Awards for "The Dove", and in the 2006 Thelonious Monk International Jazz Piano Competition he was one of the top 18 pianists. After having participated in the Television and Film Scoring Workshop with Richard Bellis in 2007, he was awarded the ASCAP Foundation David Rose Scholarship. Also in 2007 he was the Composition Winner in the University of Miami Concerto Competition for his Concerto for Jazz Violin and Orchestra.

=== 2000-22: Composing and performing ===
"'New York Night' was painted in 1929 by the noted American avant-garde artist Georgia O'Keeffe. My composition, inspired by O'Keeffe's work, attempts to evoke the mood of her painting and the aesthetic ideals of the early 20th century American avant-garde movement. The music emulates O'Keeffe's striking nocturnal palette and her singular treatment of light and form. The rhythms, colors, and sounds of the night are at play in 'the city that never sleeps.'"
— Scott Routenberg

He was the fifth composer commissioned as part of the First Music series by the New York Youth Symphony, with his composition New York Night premiering in 2007 at Lincoln Center in New York City. New York Night is a single movement of an extended composition entitled Americana Suite.

His orchestral pops arrangements have been commissioned by the Muncie Symphony Orchestra and Michael Krajewski of the Atlanta Symphony Orchestra, among other conductors and ensembles. His jazz arrangements have been commissioned and performed by composer Vince Mendoza, during Mendoza's tenure as chief conductor of the Metropole Orkest. Other commissioners include pianist Howard Levy of Béla Fleck and the Flecktones and Singapore jazz pianist and big band leader Jeremy Monteiro, among others. Since 2011 Routenberg has been an arranger for the Metropole Orkest in the Netherlands. His orchestral pops arrangements have been performed by American symphony orchestras including those of Atlanta, Houston, Baltimore, Indianapolis, Phoenix, Orlando and Naples. World premieres include Ukraine, the Netherlands, and China, and his music has been premiered in Carnegie Hall, Lincoln Center, the Concertgebouw in Amsterdam, and the Fox Newman Scoring Stage in Los Angeles.

One of his more popular orchestral works is his Concerto for Jazz Violin and Orchestra. It premiered in Lviv, Ukraine on June 21, 2014, by American jazz violinist Christian Howes, on invitation from the U.S. Embassy in Kyiv as part of a "cultural diplomacy mission." U.S. Embassy Cultural Attache Andrew Paul was quoted saying at the concert that "the piece is groundbreaking with the use of improvised violin solos."

In 2016 Routenberg was chosen as the recipient of the second annual ASCAP Foundation/Symphonic Jazz Orchestra Commissioning Prize, which honors the legacy of George Duke.

As a jazz pianist Routenberg has performed at international venues such as the Montreaux Jazz Festival, Jazz à Vienne, and the North Sea Jazz Festival, and he has performed with musicians such as Howard Levy and Billy Contreras. He often performs live with a rotating lineup of musicians.

Scott Routenberg Trio

Routenberg has released two jazz piano trio albums on Summit Records with bassist Nick Tucker and drummer Cassius Goens III—Every End is a Beginning (2017) and Supermoon (2018).

Routenberg is associate professor of Jazz Piano at Ball State University School of Music in Muncie, Indiana, where he teaches a variety of performance, theory, and history classes.

== Style ==
Routenberg is known to utilize the genres of jazz, classical, electronica, and big band, among others. His 2003, 2006, and 2020 albums "explore jazz-influenced electro-acoustic hybrids."

He has stated that influences on his work in jazz piano include Oscar Peterson, Bill Evans, Chick Corea, Herbie Hancock, and Benny Green. Stated Routenberg's collaborator and jazz violinist Christian Howes, "Scott Routenberg is a rare musician with both the experience to play modern jazz piano on the highest level and the discipline to write elegant, long-form symphonic pieces."

== Personal life ==
Routenberg currently lives in Muncie, Indiana. He is married to Sofia Kraevska. From Lviv, Ukraine, Kraevska also earned her doctorate in composition from the University of Miami and is a pianist and composer as well.

== Discography ==
=== Albums ===
Albums by Scott Routenberg
Year	Album title	Release details
2000	Shapeshifter	Released: 2000; Label: Denmaster Music; Format: CD
2003	Lots of Pulp	Released: 2003; Label: Independent; Format: CD
2006	Jazztronicus	Released: 2006, Mar 25, 2010; Label: Independent; Format: CD, digital ('10)
2017	Every End is a Beginning	Released: Mar 10, 2017; Label: Summit Records; Format: CD
2018	Supermoon	Released: Sep 7, 2018; Label: Summit Records; Format: CD
2020	[Inside]	Released: Nov 6, 2020; Label: Summit Records; Format: CD
2026	Scott Routenberg Trio Live at Merrimans' Playhouse: Oscar Peterson Tribute	Released: Jan 16, 2026; Label: Chroma Note Records; Format: CD

=== As arranger ===
Year	Artist	Album title	Notes / Credits
2021	Metropole Orkest	Metropole Studio Sessions: Dutch Jazz Jam I (Live)	Symphonic jazz arrangement on track 2: "Little Rootie Tootie"
2024	Jeremy Monteiro and Resound Collective	Tapestry (Live)	Symphonic jazz arrangements on tracks 1, 3, 5, and 6

=== Film scores ===
Year	Film title	Director / Producer	Type	Notes
2009	This Is Life	Wai Choy	Short drama	Original score composer; officially screened at the Filmstock International Film Festival in London
2021	The Joes	Peter Krygowski	Short film noir	Original score composer; premiered at the Culver City Film Festival in Los Angeles

=== Singles ===
Selected songs by Scott Routenberg
Year	Title	Album	Certifications
2004	"Through Your Eyes"	N/A	Miami Winner, The Heineken Music Initiative
2004	"Bandwidth"	Jazztronicus	EMI Records

=== Compositions ===
Selected scores and compositions by Scott Routenberg
Year	Release title	Debut	Role, notes
2006	The Dove		Composer
2007	New York Night	Lincoln Center in New York City	Composer
2007	Concerto for Jazz Violin and Orchestra		Composer

== Awards and nominations ==
Year	Award	Nominated work	Category	Result
2003	Hilton Head Jazz Society Scholarship	Scott Routenberg	Piano Performance	Won
2004	John Lennon; Songwriting Contest	"Bandwidth"	Maxell Song of the Year	Won
2004	John Lennon; Songwriting Contest	"Bandwidth"	Best Jazz Song	Won
2004	Heineken Music Initiative/ ASCAP Foundation Grant Program	"Through Your Eyes"	R&B Songwriters	Won
2006	Downbeat Student Music Awards	The Dove	College Original Extended Composition	Won
2007	University of Miami; Concerto Competition	Concerto for Jazz; Violin and Orchestra	Composition	Won
2016	ASCAP Foundation Grant Program/ Symphonic Jazz Orchestra Commissioning Prize	New Commission	Composition	Won

== See also ==
- List of jazz pianists
- List of jazz arrangers
