= Private Screenings =

- Starring: Robert Osborne
- Country of origin: United States
- No. of episodes: 28

Production
- Production locations: Turner Broadcasting Techwood Campus, Atlanta, Georgia
- Running time: 60 minutes

Original release
- Network: Turner Classic Movies
- Release: September 5, 1995 – January 6, 2014

Private Screenings is a television documentary and interview series that aired on Turner Classic Movies. The series is hosted by Robert Osborne and featured noted personalities from the Golden Age of Hollywood, with clips from his or her work. A special episode dedicated to Osborne aired on January 6, 2014, where he was interviewed by Alec Baldwin.

== Episodes ==
No.	Title	Date
1	"Jane Powell"	September 5, 1995
2	"Esther Williams"	July 16, 1996
3	"Robert Mitchum and Jane Russell"	November 2, 1996
4	"Mickey Rooney"	June 12, 1997
5	"Ann Miller"	August 20, 1997
6	"Charlton Heston"	February 16, 1998
7	"Jack Lemmon and Walter Matthau"	April 8, 1998
8	"June Allyson"	June 30, 1998
9	"Tony Curtis"	January 26, 1999
10	"Leslie Caron"	May 17, 1999
11	"Anthony Quinn"	August 2, 1999
12	"Rod Steiger"	April 11, 2000
13	"Betty Hutton"	July 18, 2000
14	"James Garner"	August 2, 2001
15	"Debbie Reynolds"	September 25, 2002
16	"Shirley MacLaine"	November 4, 2003
17	"Patricia Neal"	June 28, 2004
18	"Lauren Bacall"	August 1, 2005
19	"Sidney Lumet"	October 11, 2005
20	"Angela Lansbury"	August 1, 2006
21	"Child Stars (Darryl Hickman, Dickie Moore, Margaret O'Brien, Jane Withers)"	October 2, 2006
22	"Stanley Donen"	December 6, 2006
23	"Jane Fonda"	March 29, 2007
24	"Norman Jewison"	September 13, 2007
25	"Walter Mirisch"	September 29, 2008
26	"Ernest Borgnine"	January 16, 2009
27	"Liza Minnelli"	December 11, 2010
