= AFI's Master Class: The Art of Collaboration =

Television series

- Country of origin: United States

Production
- Running time: 60 minutes

Original release
- Network: Turner Classic Movies
- Release: November 7, 2011 – December 10, 2014

AFI's Master Class: The Art of Collaboration is an American talk show broadcast on Turner Classic Movies.

== Overview ==
Filmed in front of an audience of students at the AFI Conservatory the series explores artistic film collaborations.

== Episodes ==
1. Steven Spielberg & John Williams (November 7, 2011)
2. Mark Wahlberg & David O. Russell (May 8, 2012)
3. Robert Zemeckis & Don Burgess (January 14, 2013)
4. Rob Reiner & Robert Leighton (December 10, 2014)
