= The Essentials (TV program) =

American television series on TCM

- Presented by: See Hosts
- Country of origin: United States
- No. of seasons: 18

Original release
- Network: Turner Classic Movies
- Release: April 1, 2001 – September 19, 2020

The Essentials is an American weekly film-focused television program broadcast on Turner Classic Movies (TCM), with TCM hosts and special guests introducing and discussing some of the best movies ever made.

== Overview ==
In 2001, Turner Classic Movies launched The Essentials with actor and filmmaker Rob Reiner as the host, who delivered an introduction to explain why the following film is culturally and artistically significant. Reiner then returned with an outro segment. Tom Karsch, then-executive vice president and general manager of TCM, told Variety he had expected the series to "provide a road map" to the movies will help to "attract a broader and younger group of people" to watch the network. The first installment was Citizen Kane (1941), which aired on Sunday, April 1, 2001 at 6 p.m. Eastern Time and continued with another film for the next 26 weeks.

In 2003, filmmaker and actor Sydney Pollack hosted the series' third season, beginning with The Philadelphia Story (1940) on Sunday, April 6. Pollack compiled his list of essential films in collaboration with Tom Brown, TCM's vice president of program production, and Charlie Coates, the series' writer-director. In Pollack's second season in 2004, The Essentials began airing on Saturdays at 8 p.m. ET.

In 2005, filmmaker and historian Peter Bogdanovich was announced as the series' third host. He personally selected 27 classic films to give introductory and closing segments for. Among his selections were Steamboat Bill, Jr. (1928), La Grande Illusion (1937), Arsenic and Old Lace (1944), and Vertigo (1958).

The next year, The Essentials was revamped with TCM primetime host Robert Osborne in conversation with a guest host. The 2006 season featured film historian and critic Molly Haskell. In an interview, Haskell recalled: "They enlisted me and they sent me a list of—I didn't actually choose [...] the 30 films that we did aren't necessarily my all-time favorites—but they sent a list of 60 and I chose 40 and then they whittled it down to 30. That's what we came up with."

The 2007 season featured Osborne and actress Carrie Fisher, beginning with their broadcast of Breakfast at Tiffany's (1961) on March 10. The selected films were chosen from an initial group of 50 which Fisher selected from TCM's film library. From there, Osborne selected 30 of these. After watching the films, their conversations about the films were taped. When asked why none of her mother Debbie Reynolds's films were included in the lineup, Fisher joked: "I didn't get to pick them. It's not my fault."

The 2008 season featured actress Rose McGowan as the co-host, beginning with The Apartment (1960) on March 8. McGowan had previously co-presented The Night of the Hunter (1955) during a broadcast of TCM Guest Programmer a year before, which led to her selection as a co-host for The Essentials.

The 2009 season featured Alec Baldwin as the new co-host opposite Robert Osborne, beginning on March 7 with A Night at the Opera (1935). Baldwin had previously appeared on TCM Guest Programmer, and in 2008, hosted the TCM special Role Model: Gene Wilder, in which he interviewed the actor. Baldwin returned for another two seasons in 2010 and 2011.

Drew Barrymore co-hosted the 2012 season of The Essentials, starting with Some Like It Hot (1959) on Saturday, March 3.

Sally Field co-hosted with Osborne the 2015 season of The Essentials, which premiered on Saturday, March 7, with a broadcast of Roman Holiday (1953). In 2016, TCM announced a second season of The Essentials with Sally Field had experienced a "production delay" because of Osborne's poor health.

Following Osborne's death in March 2017, Alec Baldwin was named as the new host of The Essentials, with the new season premiering on Saturday, May 6. His guests included David Letterman, his 30 Rock co-star Tina Fey, and William Friedkin.

In 2019, The Essentials was revived with new primetime host Ben Mankiewicz joined with director Ava DuVernay. The 17th season premiered on May 4 with Marty (1955). A year later, Mankiewicz was joined with director Brad Bird, who hand-picked 20 of his favorite films for the 2020 season of The Essentials. The season premiered on May 2 at 8:00 p.m. ET. with Singin' in the Rain (1952).

== Hosts ==
For the program's first five seasons, a single individual hosted the program. From 2006 to 2015, a guest host was paired with the principal host of TCM, Robert Osborne.

- Rob Reiner (2001−2002)
- Sydney Pollack (2003-2004)
- Peter Bogdanovich (2005)
- Robert Osborne (2006−2015)
- Molly Haskell (2006)
- Carrie Fisher (2007)
- Rose McGowan (2008)
- Alec Baldwin (2009−2011; 2017)
- Drew Barrymore (2012−2014)
- Sally Field (2015)
- David Letterman (2017)
- Tina Fey (2017)
- William Friedkin (2017)
- Ben Mankiewicz (2019–2020)
- Ava DuVernay (2019)
- Brad Bird (2020)

== Films featured on The Essentials ==
=== 2001 season ===
- Citizen Kane (1941)
- The Producers (1968)
- North by Northwest (1959)
- In the Heat of the Night (1967)
- Giant (1956)
- The Maltese Falcon (1941)
- A Night at the Opera (1935)
- Gaslight (1944)
- The Man Who Shot Liberty Valance (1962)
- The Treasure of the Sierra Madre (1948)
- A Streetcar Named Desire (1951)
- Elmer Gantry (1960)
- Witness for the Prosecution (1957)
- From Here to Eternity (1953)
- Casablanca (1942)
- To Kill a Mockingbird (1962)
- Dr. Strangelove (1964)
- White Heat (1949)
- Singin' in the Rain (1952)
- Inherit the Wind (1960)
- Birdman of Alcatraz (1962)
- Dial M for Murder (1954)
- The Bank Dick (1940)
- Paths of Glory (1957)
- Top Hat (1935)
- Yankee Doodle Dandy (1942)
- Some Like It Hot (1959)

=== 2002 season ===
- High Noon (1952)
- West Side Story (1961)
- Sweet Smell of Success (1957)
- Annie Hall (1977)
- Spartacus (1960)
- Fail Safe (1964)
- American Graffiti (1973)
- To Be or Not to Be (1942)
- The Night of the Hunter (1955)
- The Caine Mutiny (1954)
- Ninotchka (1939)
- The Defiant Ones (1958)
- The Lost Weekend (1945)
- Paper Moon (1973)
- Duck Soup (1933)
- Jaws (1975)
- Sullivan's Travels (1941)
- The Asphalt Jungle (1950)
- A Face in the Crowd (1957)
- The Searchers (1956)
- I Am a Fugitive from a Chain Gang (1932)
- Mildred Pierce (1945)
- Double Indemnity (1944)
- Rocky (1976)

=== 2003 season ===
- The Philadelphia Story (1940)
- Bonnie and Clyde (1967)
- The Wild One (1953)
- Guys and Dolls (1955)
- 2001: A Space Odyssey (1968)
- It Happened One Night (1934)
- Champion (1949)
- A Star Is Born (1954)
- The Shop Around the Corner (1940)
- Bringing Up Baby (1938)
- On the Waterfront (1954)
- Stagecoach (1939)
- Wuthering Heights (1939)
- The Magnificent Seven (1960)
- Touch of Evil (1958)
- Force of Evil (1948)
- Once Upon a Time in the West (1968)
- Pillow Talk (1959)
- Strangers on a Train (1951)
- Rebel Without a Cause (1955)
- Notorious (1946)

=== 2004 season ===
- Rebel Without a Cause (1955)
- An American in Paris (1951)
- Rear Window (1954)
- Annie Hall (1977)
- Singin' in the Rain (1952)
- The Day of the Jackal (1973)
- The Red Badge of Courage (1951)
- Spellbound (1945)
- The Treasure of the Sierra Madre (1948)
- Doctor Zhivago (1965)
- Citizen Kane (1941)
- Casablanca (1942)
- Bringing Up Baby (1938)
- On the Waterfront (1954)
- High Noon (1952)
- Dr. Strangelove (1964)
- Random Harvest (1942)
- Tootsie (1982)
- Papillon (1973)
- The Quiet Man (1952)
- To Kill a Mockingbird (1962)
- Some Like It Hot (1959)
- Mr. Deeds Goes to Town (1936)

=== 2005 season ===
- The Miracle of Morgan's Creek (1944)
- The Lady from Shanghai (1947)
- Adam's Rib (1949)
- The Band Wagon (1953)
- North by Northwest (1959)
- His Girl Friday (1940)
- La Grande Illusion (1937)
- Out of the Past (1947)
- Swing Time (1936)
- To Have and Have Not (1944)
- Arsenic and Old Lace (1944)
- Gaslight (1944)
- They Were Expendable (1945)
- The Lady Eve (1941)
- The Big Sleep (1946)
- Vertigo (1958)
- Steamboat Bill, Jr. (1928)
- White Heat (1949)
- It Should Happen to You (1954)
- Invasion of the Body Snatchers (1956)
- The Magnificent Ambersons (1942)
- The Merry Widow (1934)
- Fort Apache (1948)
- The Shop Around the Corner (1940)
- The Awful Truth (1937)
- Some Came Running (1958)
- Mogambo (1953)

=== 2006 season ===
- The Hustler (1961)
- The Quiet Man (1952)
- Brief Encounter (1945)
- Duck Soup (1933)
- Winchester '73 (1950)
- Imitation of Life (1959)
- The Four Feathers (1939)
- A Place in the Sun (1951)
- Gilda (1946)
- Ride the High Country (1962)
- Top Hat (1935)
- From Here to Eternity (1953)
- Mr. Smith Goes to Washington (1939)
- Sunset Boulevard (1950)
- The Thin Man (1934)
- Black Narcissus (1947)
- Gone with the Wind (1939)
- Kiss Me Deadly (1955)
- Foreign Correspondent (1940)
- The Maltese Falcon (1941)
- Jezebel (1938)
- The Treasure of the Sierra Madre (1948)
- Written on the Wind (1956)
- The Manchurian Candidate (1962)
- Gunga Din (1939)
- Stalag 17 (1953)
- Little Women (1933)
- Murder, My Sweet (1944)

=== 2007 season ===
- Breakfast at Tiffany's (1961)
- Hud (1963)
- It's a Mad, Mad, Mad, Mad World (1963)
- Fear Strikes Out (1957)
- That Touch of Mink (1962)
- The Great Dictator (1940)
- Roman Holiday (1953)
- The Adventures of Robin Hood (1938)
- The Producers (1968)
- My Fair Lady (1964)
- Ball of Fire (1941)
- The African Queen (1951)
- Take the Money and Run (1969)
- King Kong (1933)
- Harvey (1950)
- The Lost Weekend (1945)
- Dodsworth (1936)
- Topper (1937)
- Sorry, Wrong Number (1948)
- Pride and Prejudice (1940)
- The Bridge on the River Kwai (1957)
- Born Yesterday (1950)
- Red River (1948)
- The Importance of Being Earnest (1952)
- Notorious (1946)

=== 2008 season ===
- The Apartment (1960)
- The Music Box (1932)
- Sons of the Desert (1933)
- The Bad and the Beautiful (1952)
- The Great Escape (1963)
- All About Eve (1950)
- The Night of the Hunter (1955)
- The Misfits (1961)
- Paper Moon (1973)
- Rebecca (1940)
- Now, Voyager (1942)
- Seven Brides for Seven Brothers (1954)
- Paths of Glory (1957)
- Psycho (1960)
- Fanny (1961)
- A Face in the Crowd (1957)
- Seven Samurai (1954)
- The Spiral Staircase (1946)
- 3:10 to Yuma (1957)
- The Postman Always Rings Twice (1946)
- You Can't Take It with You (1938)
- Modern Times (1936)
- Swing Time (1936)
- Woman of the Year (1942)
- Witness for the Prosecution (1957)
- Dinner at Eight (1933)
- Sweet Smell of Success (1957)

=== 2009 season ===
- A Night at the Opera (1935)
- Rocky (1976)
- Cat Ballou (1965)
- Ben-Hur (1959)
- Take the Money and Run (1969)
- Saboteur (1942)
- Butch Cassidy and the Sundance Kid (1969)
- Funny Girl (1968)
- I Am a Fugitive from a Chain Gang (1932)
- Mutiny on the Bounty (1935)
- The Devil and Daniel Webster (1941)
- Battleground (1949)
- Dr. Jekyll and Mr. Hyde (1941)
- The Letter (1940)
- The Fortune Cookie (1966)
- Random Harvest (1942)
- Notorious (1946)
- The Mouse That Roared (1959)
- Tom Jones (1963)
- The Man Who Came to Dinner (1942)
- An Affair to Remember (1957)
- The Asphalt Jungle (1950)
- Lolita (1962)
- The Guns of Navarone (1961)
- The Long, Hot Summer (1958)
- Wuthering Heights (1939)
- The Grapes of Wrath (1940)

=== 2010 season ===
- A Streetcar Named Desire (1951)
- Saturday Night Fever (1977)
- White Heat (1949)
- Lawrence of Arabia (1962)
- Gigi (1958)
- Bonnie and Clyde (1967)
- Serpico (1973)
- Judgment at Nuremberg (1961)
- Strangers on a Train (1951)
- The Graduate (1967)
- A Foreign Affair (1948)
- The Lion in Winter (1968)
- The Blue Dahlia (1946)
- The Hunchback of Notre Dame (1939)
- The Best Years of Our Lives (1946)
- Mutiny on the Bounty (1935)
- San Francisco (1936)
- A Star Is Born (1954)
- The Snake Pit (1948)
- Meet Me in St. Louis (1944)
- My Darling Clementine (1946)
- Road to Morocco (1942)
- Black Orpheus (1959)
- Bad Day at Black Rock (1955)
- The Sea Hawk (1940)
- Leave Her to Heaven (1945)
- The Sting (1973)
- Kind Hearts and Coronets (1949)
- Meet John Doe (1941)

=== 2011 season ===
- Cool Hand Luke (1967)
- Love Me Tonight (1932)
- Hannah and Her Sisters (1986)
- Mildred Pierce (1945)
- The Loneliness of the Long Distance Runner (1962)
- Splendor in the Grass (1961)
- Ball of Fire (1941)
- Gunga Din (1939)
- An American in Paris (1951)
- Bicycle Thieves (1948)
- Cat People (1942)
- East of Eden (1955)
- Thirty Seconds Over Tokyo (1944)
- Dodsworth (1936)
- The Caine Mutiny (1954)
- Bringing Up Baby (1938)
- Out of the Past (1947)
- City Lights (1931)
- Fail Safe (1964)
- The Misfits (1961)
- Kiss of the Spider Woman (1985)
- All Quiet on the Western Front (1930)
- Stage Door (1937)
- The Man Who Shot Liberty Valance (1962)
- A Place in the Sun (1951)
- A Letter to Three Wives (1949)
- Sunset Boulevard (1950)
- Miracle on 34th Street (1947)
- The Bank Dick (1940)

=== 2012 season ===
- Some Like It Hot (1959)
- This Is Spinal Tap (1984)
- The Razor's Edge (1946)
- Alice Adams (1935)
- The Goodbye Girl (1977)
- Sunrise: A Song of Two Humans (1927)
- Gilda (1946)
- The Fallen Idol (1948)
- Close Encounters of the Third Kind (1977)
- The Third Man (1949)
- Camille (1936)
- Les Diaboliques (1955)
- Wuthering Heights (1939)
- Dinner at Eight (1933)
- Alice Doesn't Live Here Anymore (1974)
- Jezebel (1938)
- The Way We Were (1973)
- Kramer vs. Kramer (1979)
- Rebel Without a Cause (1955)
- Sullivan's Travels (1941)
- Summertime (1955)
- The Band Wagon (1953)
- To Have and Have Not (1944)
- What Ever Happened to Baby Jane? (1962)
- Lolita (1962)
- Captains Courageous (1937)
- The Wild Bunch (1969)
- Lost in America (1985)

=== 2013 season ===
- Grand Hotel (1932)
- The Big Chill (1983)
- Tootsie (1982)
- Gun Crazy (1950)
- The Lady Eve (1941)
- Lawrence of Arabia (1962)
- Anna and the King of Siam (1946)
- Freaks (1932)
- Giant (1956)
- Gold Diggers of 1933 (1933)
- How Green Was My Valley (1941)
- Stand by Me (1986)
- Bride of Frankenstein (1935)
- Friendly Persuasion (1956)
- Libeled Lady (1936)
- Breathless (1960)
- The Palm Beach Story (1942)
- The Searchers (1956)
- Auntie Mame (1958)
- Key Largo (1948)
- The Women (1939)
- Gaslight (1944)
- Diner (1982)
- The Bad and the Beautiful (1952)
- Lifeboat (1944)
- It Happened One Night (1934)
- Silkwood (1983)
- Jaws (1975)

=== 2014 season ===
- Marty (1955)
- The Sugarland Express (1974)
- The Pink Panther (1963)
- His Girl Friday (1940)
- Field of Dreams (1989)
- How to Marry a Millionaire (1953)
- Laura (1944)
- Beauty and the Beast (1946)
- In the Heat of the Night (1967)
- Stella Dallas (1937)
- The Haunting (1963)
- The Dirty Dozen (1967)
- My Fair Lady (1964)
- On the Waterfront (1954)
- To Be or Not to Be (1942)
- I Love You, Alice B. Toklas (1968)
- Blowup (1966)
- The Champ (1931)
- Who's Afraid of Virginia Woolf? (1966)
- Bus Stop (1956)
- Metropolis (1927)
- The Thin Man (1934)
- Foreign Correspondent (1940)
- Coal Miner's Daughter (1980)
- Belle de Jour (1967)
- Network (1976)
- Twentieth Century (1934)
- The Black Stallion (1979)

=== 2015 season ===
- Roman Holiday (1953)
- The More the Merrier (1943)
- Now, Voyager (1942)
- The Prisoner of Zenda (1937)
- Witness for the Prosecution (1957)
- Klute (1971)
- Alice Doesn't Live Here Anymore (1974)
- The Hustler (1961)
- The Wind (1928)
- Friendly Persuasion (1956)
- I Remember Mama (1948)
- The Red Shoes (1948)
- Ninotchka (1939)
- To Kill a Mockingbird (1962)
- The Man Who Would Be King (1975)
- Bullitt (1968)
- Here Comes Mr. Jordan (1941)
- The Picture of Dorian Gray (1945)
- Yankee Doodle Dandy (1942)
- The Shop Around the Corner (1940)
- The Candidate (1972)
- Swing Time (1936)
- The Ghost and Mrs. Muir (1947)
- East of Eden (1955)
- The Nun's Story (1959)
- One Flew Over the Cuckoo's Nest (1975)
- Norma Rae (1979)
- Sunset Boulevard (1950)

=== 2017 season ===
- The Bad and the Beautiful (1952)
- East of Eden (1955)
- Gilda (1946)
- No Time for Sergeants (1958)
- Brief Encounter (1945)
- The Lost Weekend (1945)
- The Big Sleep (1946)
- Rear Window (1954)
- The Lady Eve (1941)
- Bride of Frankenstein (1935)
- Woman of the Year (1942)
- All About Eve (1950)
- Some Like It Hot (1959)
- Singin' in the Rain (1952)
- The Quiet Man (1952)
- The Manchurian Candidate (1962)
- White Heat (1949)
- Bullitt (1968)
- 2001: A Space Odyssey (1968)
- The Band Wagon (1953)
- The Treasure of the Sierra Madre (1948)

=== 2019 season ===
- Marty (1955)
- Ashes and Embers (1982)
- Cabin in the Sky (1943)
- Pather Panchali (1955)
- West Side Story (1961)
- Harlan County, USA (1976)
- La Pointe Courte (1955)
- Dog Day Afternoon (1975)
- Daughters of the Dust (1991)
- The Battle of Algiers (1966)
- Gandhi (1982)
- Losing Ground (1982)
- Claudine (1974)
- Sounder (1972)
- Rashomon (1950)
- Les Rendez-vous d'Anna (1978)
- A Warm December (1973)
- The Diary of Anne Frank (1959)

=== 2020 season ===
- Singin' in the Rain (1952)
- Ace in the Hole (1951)
- The General (1926)
- Casablanca (1942)
- The Red Shoes (1948)
- Lawrence of Arabia (1962)
- Gunga Din (1939)
- A Matter of Life and Death (1946)
- A Hard Day's Night (1964)
- The Music Man (1962)
- Dr. Strangelove (1964)
- The Maltese Falcon (1941)
- 2001: A Space Odyssey (1968)
- Ball of Fire (1941)
- City Lights (1931)
- An American in Paris (1951)
- The Searchers (1956)
- North by Northwest (1959)
- Out of the Past (1947)
- Guys and Dolls (1955)

== Essentials, Jr. ==
A spin-off showcase, Essentials, Jr., aired in the summer months of 2007 through 2014, on Sunday nights at 8:00 PM Eastern Time. The featured films were chosen for their appeal to families with young children. The original host was Tom Kenny; he was replaced for the second season by co-hosts Abigail Breslin and Chris O'Donnell. John Lithgow hosted the 2009 and 2010 seasons. The program was hosted from 2011 through 2014 by Bill Hader of Saturday Night Live fame.
