= Solace for the Lonely =

Solace For The Lonely

Studio album by Robinella
- Released: February 21, 2006
- Genre: crossover Jazz Country Swing
- Length: 49:24
- Label: Dualtone Records
- Producer: Doug Lancio

Robinella studio album chronology
Robinella and the CCstringband (2003)	Solace For The Lonely (2006)

Solace for the Lonely is the fourth album by Robinella and the first album the group issued under this name. Prior to this release the group was known as Robinella and the CCstringband.

Thom Jurek of AllMusic rated the album 4 out of 5 stars, writing that "it's full of adventure, fun, and mischief."

== Track listing ==
1. "Break It Down
2. "Solace for the Lonely"
3. "Press On"
4. "Down the Mountain"
5. "Whippin Wind"
6. "Come Back My Way"
7. "Little Boy"
8. "Oh So Sexy"
9. "Teardrops"
10. "All I've Given"
11. "Waiting"
12. "Brand New Key"
13. "I Fall in Love as Much as I Can"
