= Robert Osborne =

American film historian and actor (1932–2017)

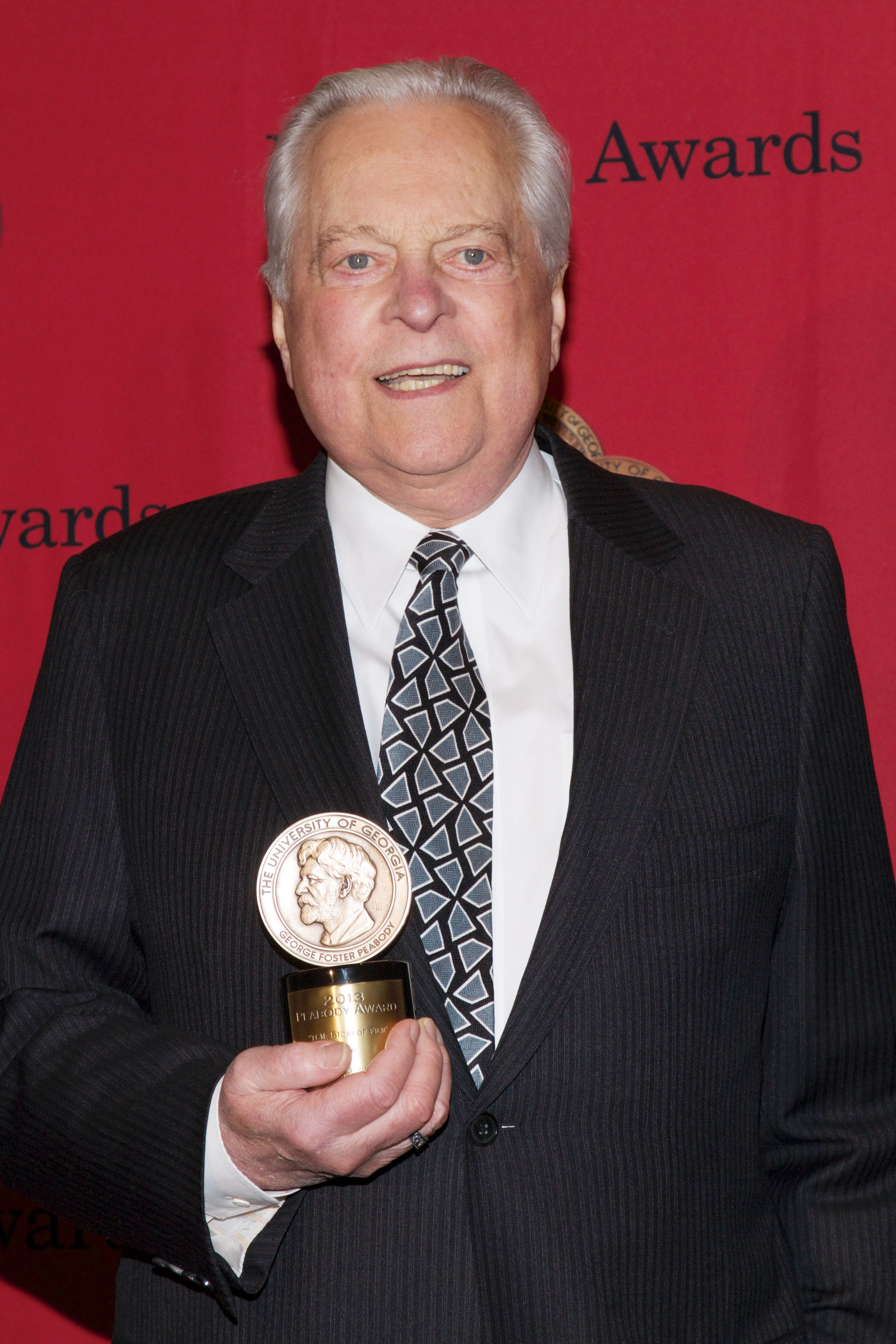
- Osborne at the 73rd Annual Peabody Awards in 2014
- Born: Robert Jolin Osborne; May 3, 1932; Colfax, Washington, U.S.
- Died: March 6, 2017 (aged 84); New York City, U.S.
- Education: University of Washington
- Occupations: Film historian; television presenter; author; actor
- Years active: 1958–2016
- Partner: David Staller

Robert Jolin Osborne (/ˈɒzbɔːrn/; May 3, 1932 – March 6, 2017) was an American film historian, author, actor and the primary television host for the premium cable channel Turner Classic Movies (TCM) for over twenty years.

Born in Colfax, Washington, Osborne graduated from the University of Washington's School of Journalism. In 1959, he signed a contract as an actor with Lucille Ball's production company Desilu. There, he appeared in a television episode of Westinghouse Desilu Playhouse and the pilot episode of The Beverly Hillbillies. Ball encouraged Osborne to pursue a career in writing. Afterwards, he published his first book Academy Awards Illustrated in 1965. In 1977, Osborne was hired as a news columnist for The Hollywood Reporter. In 1982, he began writing the "Rambling Reporter" column, whereby he reviewed films and Broadway plays.

From 1984 to 1993, Osborne appeared as an on-air host for The Movie Channel. In 1994, Osborne served as the primetime host for Turner Classic Movies (TCM) until 2016. He also hosted the programming series: Private Screenings and The Essentials. In 2010, Osborne hosted the TCM Classic Film Festival and Classic Cruise until 2014. Osborne died on March 6, 2017, at the age of 84.

== Early life ==
Osborne was born on May 3, 1932, in Colfax, Washington. His parents were Robert Eugene Osborne, a public school teacher, and Hazel Ida (née Jolin). In 1941, Osborne's fascination with Hollywood began when his mother purchased for him the August edition of Modern Screen magazine featuring Lana Turner; inside, there was an advertisement for Kiss the Boys Goodbye, in which Mary Martin's lips were colored red in a black-and-white spread.

At twelve years old, Osborne landed a summer job at the Rose Theatre, where he changed the posters in the glass cases and changed the film titles on the marquee using a step ladder. After a year, he became a theatre usher and when was 15, he was reassigned as a ticket taker. In 1948, his family relocated to Everett, Washington. There, he attended Everett High School. He graduated in 1950, and gave a commencement speech titled "Youth Views the Schools."

In 1954, Osborne graduated from the University of Washington School of Journalism. While studying, he noted: "I actually spent every Saturday in college going through every copy of The New York Times over about a 20-year period, and made a list of every movie that played, and how long it ran." He then served two years in the U.S. Air Force and was stationed in Seattle, where he acted in local theater. There, he appeared in a stage production of Night Must Fall with actress Jane Darwell. She encouraged him to pursue an acting career in Hollywood, and he later stayed at her residence in the San Fernando Valley.

== Career ==
=== 1958–1965: Acting career ===
Osborne signed a six-month contract at 20th Century-Fox Television, appearing in The Californians. He next met Lucille Ball after overhearing that she was talent-searching actors for her studio, Desilu Productions. She invited Osborne to her house for dinner where actresses Janet Gaynor and Kay Thompson attended. Ball later moved the guests to the living room, where they screened Funny Face (1957) from a 35mm projector. Afterwards, Ball signed Osborne to a contract with Desilu, where in his own words, he received "a year's master class from this great artist."

As a contract actor of Ball's Desilu Workshop, Osborne appeared in a 1959 episode of Westinghouse Desilu Playhouse titled "Chain of Command", starring Hugh O'Brian. That same year, he was featured in the Desilu Playhouse holiday special "The Desilu Revue". He also appeared in the pilot episode of The Beverly Hillbillies. Sometime later, Ball encouraged Osborne to become a journalist, telling him: "What you should do is write [...] You love to do research. You love old films. Nobody is writing about films. We have enough actors, but we don't have enough writers."

=== 1965–1984: Professional writing career and The Hollywood Reporter ===
In 1965, Osborne published his first book Academy Awards Illustrated with a foreword by Bette Davis. The inspiration behind the book came when during one conversation, he had trouble remembering which actress had won an Oscar during one particular year. In 1977, Osborne interviewed Olivia de Havilland for three hours over champagne in Los Angeles, whereby they became lifelong friends. A month later, he received a surprise phone call from de Havilland to accompany her to an American Film Institute (AFI) tribute to Bette Davis. Upon arrival, he learned that he had been seated at Davis's table. That same year, Osborne's book on the Academy Awards had interested television producer Fred Tatashore, who planned to book him and de Havilland on the Dinah! television program. For additional guests, Osborne subsequently contacted publicist Ray Stricklyn, who represented Oscar-winning actresses Shirley Jones, Eva Marie Saint, and Shelley Winters. A friend from Seattle saw Osborne's appearance and reviewed his book for The Hollywood Reporter.

In 1977, Osborne began working as a columnist for The Hollywood Reporter. However, Osborne admittedly felt uncomfortable in the position. In 1985, it had been discovered that Rock Hudson had contracted AIDS. However, Osborne refused to report it, to which the publisher responded: "You're a reporter, you need to tell that story." Osborne then countered, "No, I don't. He's not the president. He's not a government official. He's an actor. He has a right to choreograph his own life." In 1982, he began publishing the Rambling Reporter column for The Hollywood Reporter, whereby he wrote short, personality-oriented news items and reviewed films and Broadway plays. He left the publication in June 2009.

In 1978, he published 50 Golden Years of Oscar, which won the 1979 National Film Book award. He served as president of the Los Angeles Film Critics Association from 1981 to 1983.

In 1985, Osborne began a relationship with Academy of Motion Picture Arts and Sciences (AMPAS), when he hosted a tribute to Shirley Temple at the Academy's Samuel Goldwyn Theatre in Beverly Hills. In 1988, AMPAS commissioned him to write 60 Years of the Oscar. He wrote five updates to the volume, the latest being 85 Years of the Oscar published in 2013.

=== 1984–1993: The Movie Channel ===
Osborne worked as the entertainment reporter on KTTV in Los Angeles from 1982 until 1987. From 1984 to 1993, Osborne appeared on The Movie Channel, in which he hosted the Heart of Hollywood behind-the-scenes and interview interstitials. Meanwhile, in 1987, Tichi Wilkerson Kassel, then-editor of The Hollywood Reporter, permitted Osborne to appear on CBS' The Morning Program to review films for one year. Within a year, The Hollywood Reporter was sold to BPI Communications, which was followed by Kassel's exit.

When his contract with the Movie Channel was to expire, Osborne lunched with actress Dorothy Lamour and then-American Movie Classics (AMC) television executives Brad Siegel and Jim Wise where they offered him the daytime afternoon hosting position, but his hiring was blocked by a management turf war. At the time, Bob Dorian was AMC's primetime host. In a 2009 interview, Dorian recalled he had never met Osborne, but nevertheless stated: "The major difference between us is that Osborne is a film historian. I'm hardly that. What I am is an actor and a fan. I love good films (and a lot of bad ones), and I know a lot of great stories."

=== 1994–2016: Turner Classic Movies ===
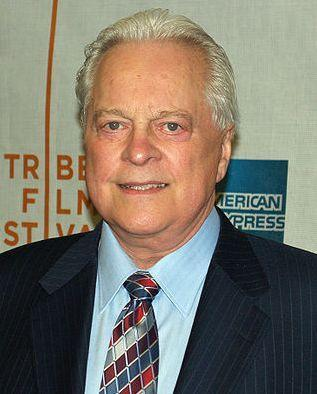
Osborne in 2007

In 1993, Siegel was hired as president of Turner Entertainment Networks. In June of the same year, Ted Turner announced the formation of Turner Classic Movies (TCM) at a Detroit company meeting. The channel was intended to emulate AMC, with its film library of the pre-May 1986 MGM releases, as well as the pre-1948 Warner Bros. and pre-1957 RKO films. Osborne was Siegel's first choice to serve as the host of its nightly primetime broadcasts.

Turner launched the channel on April 14, 1994 with Osborne presenting a three-minute introduction, explaining the channel's mission statement. Chuck Workman's 1994 documentary short 100 Years at the Movies was followed by Osborne's first on-air introduction for Gone with the Wind (1939). Osborne also hosted the series Private Screenings, featuring interviews with actors and directors. In 2006, Osborne began co-hosting The Essentials with Molly Haskell (2006 to 2007), Carrie Fisher (2007 to 2008), Rose McGowan (2008 to 2009), Alec Baldwin (2009 to 2011), Drew Barrymore and Sally Field. By 2006, Osborne reportedly taped 130 wraparound segments a week.

From 2005 to 2010, Osborne hosted the annual "Robert Osborne's Classic Film Festival," a nonprofit festival hosted by the University of Georgia's Grady College of Journalism and Mass Communication. Meanwhile, in 2006, he was selected to be the Academy's official red carpet greeter, inheriting the position from Variety columnist Army Archerd. In 2010, Osborne began hosting the TCM Classic Film Festival, with his last appearance occurring in 2014.

Beginning on July 11, 2011, Osborne stepped away from his nightly primetime hosting duties, for what the network initially described as minor surgery followed by a vacation. Osborne explained afterwards, "Essentially, I had worked 17 years straight without a vacation. I wanted a lump of time just to relax and unwind. I wanted to go get an MRI and a CAT scan. I wanted to get a facial and get some crowns put on my teeth. I wanted to start going to a gym regularly. I wanted to pamper myself a little. I feel really good and very well rested." On December 1, 2011, Osborne returned to the network following his five-month absence.

By 2013, Osborne began to delegate primetime hosting duties with Ben Mankiewicz. Mankiewicz hosted primetime films two nights a week, as well as many daytime events. Osborne stated that he would continue to work "as long as I have health, and as long as I think I look O.K. on camera." He also said, "If I really couldn't do it with enthusiasm, that would be the time to quit."

In 2013, Osborne presented the Honorary Academy Award to Angela Lansbury at the Fifth Governors Awards. Osborne introduced Lansbury by saying he thought it was "one of the best decisions the Academy has ever made". In Lansbury's acceptance speech, she made it known that she chose Osborne to present the Oscar to her, stating, "the one person who really knew about my early work was Robert Osborne". She also thanked Osborne and TCM, saying, "Thanks to Turner Classic Movies and Robert, those great films are shown and studied and discussed by students everywhere, as well as seen by a huge general audience, so thank you TCM and thank you Robert for keeping me alive all these years."

In 2014, as part of an exclusive programming deal with Disney, TCM agreed to become the sponsor of The Great Movie Ride at Disney's Hollywood Studios. The attraction underwent a refurbishment in 2015, with the addition of a new pre-show and post-show hosted by Osborne, who also provided onboard narration for the ride. The changes were unveiled on May 29, 2015, and lasted until the attraction's closure on August 13, 2017.

== Personal life and death ==
By May 2016, Osborne had not appeared on-air for the past several months. He had intended to appear at the 2016 Classic Film Festival, but he dropped out a few weeks prior citing a "health issue" in a letter he sent to fans. Osborne died from natural causes at his New York City apartment in The Osborne on West 57th Street on March 6, 2017, at the age of 84. He was survived by his partner of 20 years, David Staller, a New York City theater producer and director.

Reactions to his death included tributes from many in the entertainment industry. The Academy of Motion Picture Arts and Sciences released a statement saying, "The affection he had for the Oscars and the Academy was wholeheartedly reciprocated, and we are grateful for his friendship and indelible contribution to film history and our community." Others in the industry who mourned Osborne included Alec Baldwin, Eva Marie Saint, Liza Minnelli, Cher, Larry King, Leonard Maltin, Patricia Arquette, Bryan Cranston, and Patton Oswalt.

On the day of Osborne's death, The Hollywood Reporter published a statement by Angela Lansbury: "He was also the ultimate fan — and the ultimate friend — and our friendship will endure in my memory always".

== Favorite films ==
In an interview in 2009, with the Screen Actors Guild Foundation, Osborne stated his favorite films included:

- A Place in the Sun (1951)
- All About Eve (1950)
- The Third Man (1949)
- Sunset Boulevard (1950)
- Singin' in the Rain (1952)
- Rebecca (1940)
- Random Harvest (1942)
- Red River (1948)
- Stagecoach (1939)
- The Razor's Edge (1946)
- This Is Spinal Tap (1984)

In 2012, Osborne selected The Big Clock (1948), Dodsworth (1936), Hobson's Choice (1954), Indiscreet (1958), The Mating Season (1951), The Tall Target (1951), My Name Is Julia Ross (1945), Remember the Night (1940), Roughly Speaking (1945), and Vacation from Marriage (1945) as his "secret favorite movies".

== Filmography ==
Year	Title	Role	Notes
1961	Twenty Plus Two	Sailor with Dance Tickets	Uncredited
1967	How to Succeed in Business Without Really Trying	Junior Executive	Uncredited
1977	AFI Tribute to Bette Davis	Self	Television Special
1978	Dinah!	Self	2 episodes
1980	The Man with Bogart's Face	Reporter No. 4	
1996–2014	Private Screenings	Host	28 episodes, TCM
2005–2016	Guest Programmer	Host	145 episodes, TCM
2006–2012	The Essentials	Host	105 Episodes, TCM
2005	Harvey Birdman, Attorney at Law	Himself	Episode: "Turner Classic Birdman"
2015	Unbreakable Kimmy Schmidt	Himself	Episode: "Kimmy's in a Love Triangle!"

== Accolades ==
Osborne won the 1984 Publicists Guild of America Press Award. He also received an honorary doctorate from the Academy of Art University in 2005, and was awarded a star at Vine Street on the Hollywood Walk of Fame in 2006. In 2007, he received the National Board of Review's William K. Everson Award.

In January 2016, Osborne was given the inaugural William Cameron Menzies Award from the Art Directors Guild, recognizing his 35 years as a film historian, columnist, and critic championing visual entertainment.

In 2018, The Academy of Motion Pictures Arts and Sciences included Osborne in their "In Memoriam" montage during the 90th Academy Awards telecast.

== The Robert Osborne Award ==
In 2018, TCM inaugurated the Robert Osborne Award, to be presented at their annual Classic Film Festival "to an individual whose work has helped keep the cultural heritage of classic films alive and thriving for generations to come." The inaugural recipient was film director Martin Scorsese for his work with The Film Foundation, which he co-founded in 1990.

The honorees have included:

- 2018: Martin Scorsese
- 2019: Kevin Brownlow
- 2022: Leonard Maltin
- 2023: Donald Bogle
- 2024: Jeanine Basinger
- 2025: George Stevens Jr.
- 2026: Bruce Goldstein

== The Robert Osborne Collection ==
In 2021, the American Film Institute launched the Robert Osborne Collection. The online collection features a variety of Osborne's famous film introductions on AFI.com.

== In popular culture ==
Osborne made several cameo appearances as himself including on the Adult Swim animated series Harvey Birdman, Attorney at Law where he introduced the 2005 episode "Turner Classic Birdman". Osborne also made a cameo appearance in the Netflix comedy series Unbreakable Kimmy Schmidt episode "Kimmy's in a Love Triangle!" introducing the fictional 1938 film "Daddy's Boy!" on Turner Classic Movies.

Osborne was also spoofed on Saturday Night Live with Darrell Hammond portraying him in 2006. Jason Sudeikis portrayed him in recurring sketches from 2010 to 2012.

== Bibliography ==
Books

- Academy Awards Illustrated. ESE California. 1965. ISBN 978-0912076041.
- Hollywood Legends: The Life and Films of Humphrey Bogart and Greta Garbo. Marvin Miller. 1967. ASIN B0075MDDA0.
- Academy Awards Oscar Annual. ESE California. 1971–1976.
- Best Actor Oscar Winners Since 1927. ESE California. 1977. ISBN 978-0912076034.
- Best Picture Oscar Winners Since 1927. ESE California. 1977. ISBN 978-0912076058.
- Best Actress Oscar Winners. ESE California. 1977. ISBN 978-0912076027.
- 50 Golden Years of Oscar. ESE California. 1978. ISBN 978-0912076300.
- 60 Years of the Oscar: The Official History of the Academy Awards. Equation. 1988. ISBN 978-1853361463.
  - 65 Years of the Oscar: The Official History of the Academy Awards. Abbeville Press. 1994. ISBN 978-1558597150.
  - 70 Years of the Oscar: The Official History of the Academy Awards. Abbeville Press. 1999. ISBN 978-0789204844.
  - 75 Years of the Oscar: The Official History of the Academy Awards. Abbeville Press. 2003. ISBN 978-0789207876.
  - 80 Years of the Oscar: The Official History of the Academy Awards. Abbeville Press. 2008. ISBN 978-0789209924.
  - 85 Years of the Oscar: The Official History of the Academy Awards. Abbeville Press. 2013. ISBN 978-0789211422.
- Osborne, Robert; Foreman, Alexa L.; Peltason, Ruth A.; Vieira, Mark A. (2004). In the Picture: Production Stills from the TCM Archives. Chronicle Books. ISBN 978-0811844161.

Forewords

- Edwards, Dianna (2003). Picture Show: Classic Movie Posters from the TCM Archives. Foreword by Robert Osborne. Chronicle Books. ISBN 978-0811841542.
- Carlyle, John (2006). Under the Rainbow: An Intimate Memoir of Judy Garland, Rock Hudson and My Life in Old Hollywood. Foreword by Robert Osborne. Da Capo Press. ISBN 0786720344.
- Turner Classic Movies (2006). Leading Men: The 50 Most Unforgettable Actors of the Studio Era. Foreword by Robert Osborne. Chronicle Books. ISBN 978-0811854672.
- Turner Classic Movies (2006). Leading Ladies: The 50 Most Unforgettable Actresses of the Studio Era. Foreword by Robert Osborne. Chronicle Books. ISBN 978-0811852487.
- Miller, Frank (2008). Leading Couples: The Most Unforgettable Screen Romances of the Studio Era. Introduction by Robert Osborne. Chronicle Books. ISBN 978-0811863018.
- Arnold, Jeremy (2016). The Essentials: 52 Must-See Movies and Why They Matter. Foreword by Robert Osborne. Running Press. ISBN 978-0762459469.
