= Birdtalker =

American indie folk band

- Origin: Nashville, Tennessee, United States
- Genres: Indie folk; Americana
- Years active: 2012–present
- Label: Antifragile Music
- Members: Zack Green, Dani Green, Brian Seligman, Chris Wilson
- Website: birdtalkermusic.com

Birdtalker is an American Indie folk / Americana quintet from Nashville, Tennessee. They have released 3 full-length albums and 3 EP's. Husband and wife, Zack and Dani Green, formed Birdtalker in 2012. Their first single, "Heavy," released in 2016 on their debut EP, Just This, was an overnight folk hit, having since amassed over 90 million streams on Spotify. In 2018, Birdtalker followed Just This with their first LP, entitled, One. After years of headlining tours as well as supporting such artists as Drew Holcomb & The Neighbors, Mat Kearney, and Amos Lee, Birdtalker has continued releasing new music, following the success of One with 2021's self-titled LP, Birdtalker, and 2024's All Means, No End.

== Band Members ==
=== Current members ===
- Zack Green - vocals, guitar
- Dani Green - vocals, keys
- Brian Seligman - guitar, mandolin
- Chris Wilson - drums

=== Current Touring Musicians ===
- Lou Johnson - bass
- Jack Ivins - drums

=== Former Members ===
- Jesse Baker - bass
- Andy Hubright - drums

== Discography ==
=== Studio albums ===
Title	Label
One	Release date: June 18, 2018; Label: Endurance Music Group
Birdtalker	Release date: October 8, 2021; Label: Antifragile Music
All Means, No End	Release date: November 14, 2024; Label: Tone Tree Music / Birdtalker

=== Extended Plays ===
Title	Label
Just This	Release date: August 19, 2016; Label: Endurance Music Group
B-Sides	Release date: June 23, 2023; Label: Tone Tree Music / Birdtalker
Movin' On	Release date: January 18, 2024; Label: Tone Tree Music / Birdtalker
