= Robinella =

Music group

- Also known as: Robinella and the CCstringband
- Origin: Knoxville, Tennessee, USA
- Genres: Progressive bluegrass, Jazz blues, Pop
- Years active: 1998 – present
- Labels: Big Gulley Records, Columbia, Dualtone
- Members: Robinella Bailey, Taylor Coker, Mike Seal, Nolan Nevels, Justin Hanes
- Past members: Cruz Contreras, Billy Contreras, Steve Kovalcheck, Tom Pryor, Deric Dickens

Robinella is the band of singer-songwriter Robin Ella Bailey. The band was first formed as Robinella and the CCstringband in the late 1990s by Robin Ella Tipton Contreras and former husband, Cruz Abdon Contreras (the "CC" in CCstringband) who met while studying at the University of Tennessee, Cruz being a jazz piano major and "Robinella" an illustration/art major. They released three albums under that name before shortening it to simply Robinella with the 2006 release of Solace for the Lonely, an album that began to explore areas of pop and funk.

The album contains the country weeper "Teardrops," the funky "Waiting" and the uptempo "Oh So Sexy."

Prior to that, much of the band's work could be described as a mixture of progressive bluegrass and jazz blues. Notable early songs include many originals by "Robinella" such as "Man Over" and covers such as Nanci Griffith's "Love at the Five and Dime," and "Flashdance (What A Feeling)" from the movie soundtrack "Flashdance"

Robinella released Fly Away Bird, her much anticipated fifth album, in December 2009, along with a live album, A Sunday Kind of Love, which includes live performances from her regular show at Barley's Taproom and Pizzeria in Knoxville, Tennessee, where Robinella performed every Sunday evening for 11 years. Her most current album titled "Ode to Love" was released in 2012, The album consists mainly of love songs and boasts guitarists Frank Vignola playing and co-producing.

== Discography ==
- As Robinella and the CCstringband:
  - Robinella and the CCstringband (Big Gulley Records, 2000)
  - No Saint, No Prize (Big Gulley Records, 2001)
  - Robinella and the CCstringband (Columbia Records, May 20, 2003)
- As Robinella:
  - Solace for the Lonely (Dualtone Music Group, February 21, 2006)

=== Other contributions ===
- Eklektikos Live (2005) - "Tennessee Saturday Night"

== Television appearances ==
- Late Night with Conan O'Brien - February 25, 2003. Performed "Man Over."
- Soundstage - September 11, 2003 Performed "Man Over" and Honey Honey Bee"
- Most Wanted Live - January 10, 2004 Performed "Dress Me Up Dress Me Down"
