= Christian Howes (musician) =

American violinist, teacher, and composer

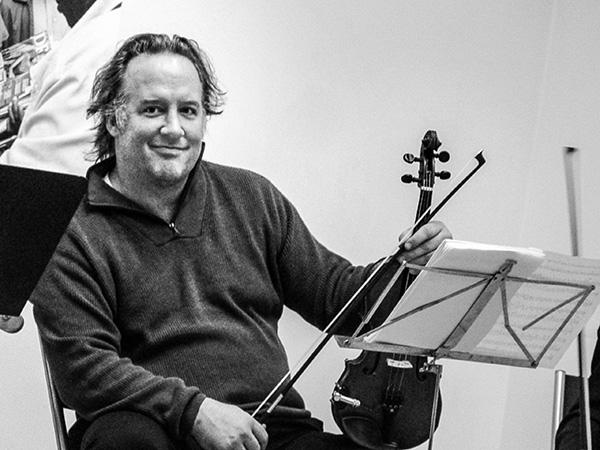
- Christian Howes in Aarhus Denmark 2011 with Joel Harrison String Choir

Background information
- Born: Christian Llewellyn Howes; February 21, 1972 (age 54); Rocky River, Ohio, U.S.
- Genres: Jazz
- Occupations: Musician, teacher, composer
- Instruments: Violin, viola, bass, guitar
- Years active: 1990–present
- Label: Resonance
- Website: christianhowes.com

Christian Howes (born February 21, 1972) is an American violinist, teacher, and composer. He is an associate professor at the Berklee College of Music. He has worked with Les Paul, Robben Ford and Greg Osby. In 2011 the DownBeat magazine Critics' Poll ranked him the No. 1 Rising Star in violin. In August 2011, Howes founded the Creative Strings Academy, with the intention of promoting contemporary music appreciation and awareness.

== Discography ==
- Confluence (Christian Howes, 1997)
- Ten Yard (Christian Howes, 1999)
- Jazz on Sale (Khaeon World Music, 2003)
- Heartfelt (Resonance, 2008) - with Roger Kellaway
- Out of the Blue (Resonance, 2010) - with Robben Ford, Bobby Floyd
- Southern Exposure (Resonance, 2012) - with Richard Galliano
- American Spirit (Resonance, 2015)
