= Screenplay for Citizen Kane =

Screenplay for 1941 drama film

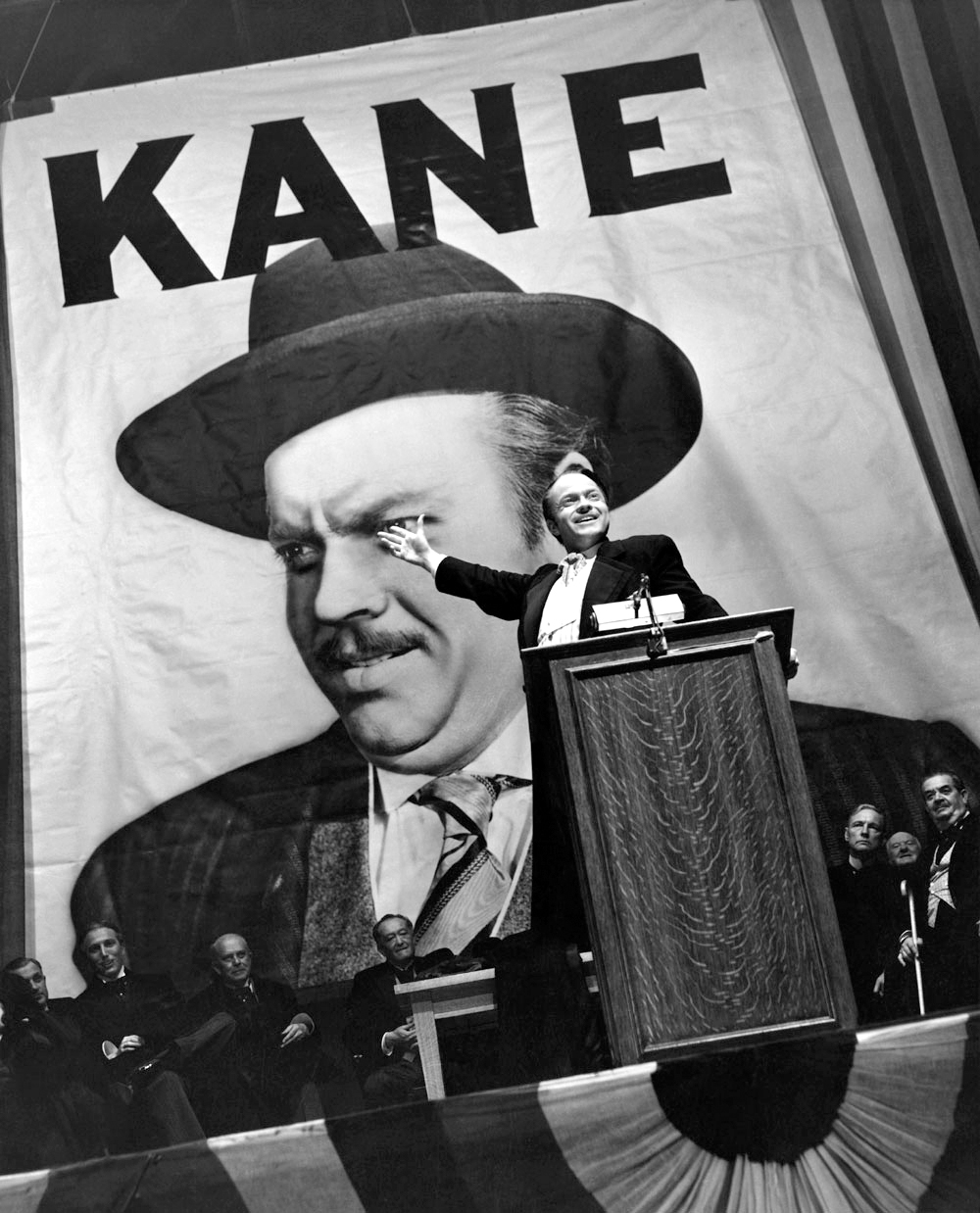
Orson Welles in Citizen Kane

The authorship of the screenplay for Citizen Kane, the 1941 American motion picture that marked the feature film debut of Orson Welles, has been one of the film's long-standing controversies. With a story spanning 60 years, the quasi-biographical film examines the life and legacy of Charles Foster Kane, played by Welles, a fictional character based in part upon the American newspaper magnate William Randolph Hearst and Chicago tycoons Samuel Insull and Harold McCormick. A rich incorporation of the experiences and knowledge of its authors, the film earned an Academy Award for Best Original Screenplay for Herman J. Mankiewicz and Welles.

== Mankiewicz as co-writer ==
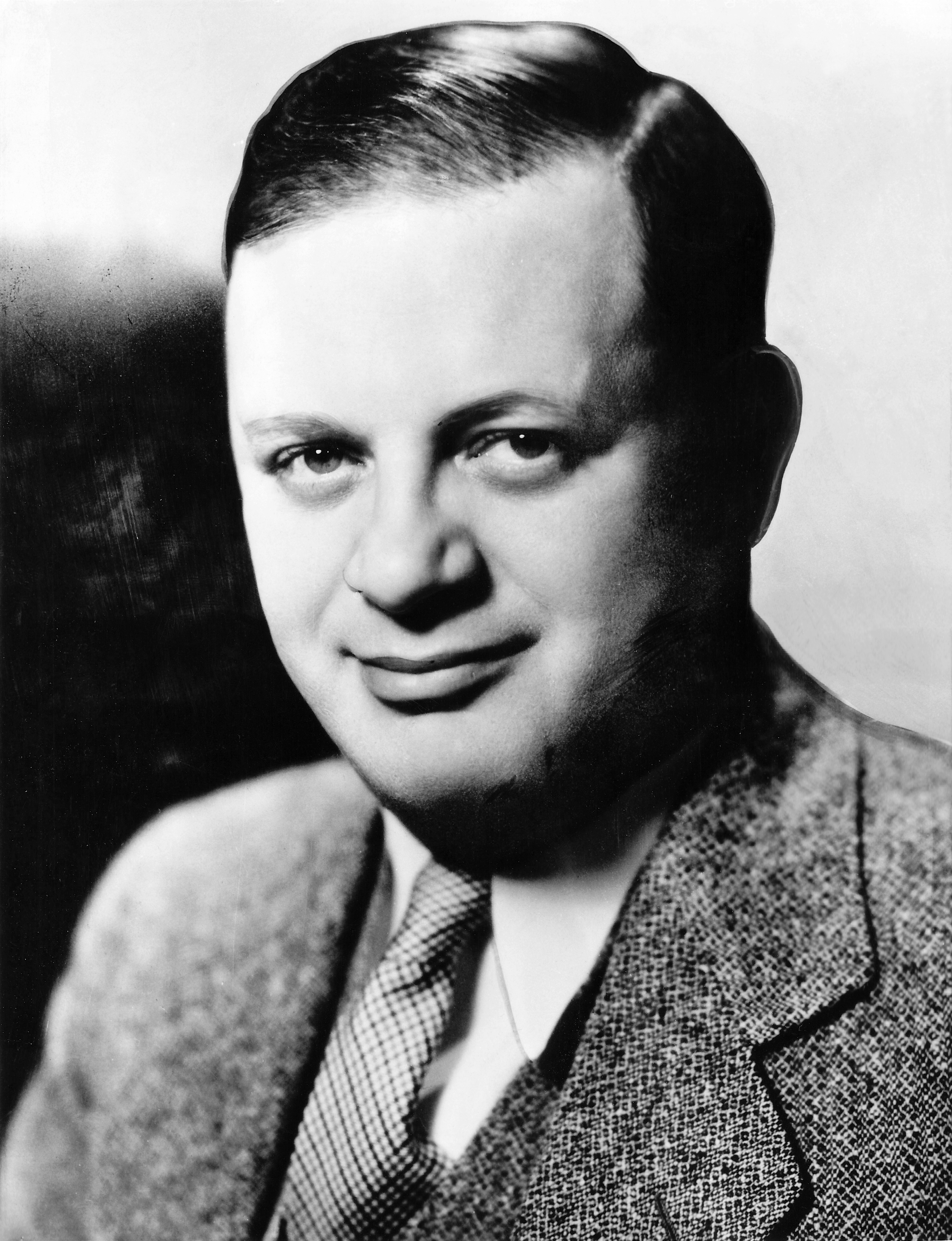
Herman J. Mankiewicz co-wrote the script in early 1940. He and Welles separately re-wrote and revised each other's work until Welles was satisfied with the finished product.

More works of conjecture … have been written on the creation of the screenplay for Citizen Kane than Orson and Herman were ever able to cram between those blue covers.

— Joseph Cotten

Screenwriter Herman J. Mankiewicz was a notorious personality in Hollywood. "His behavior, public and private, was a scandal," wrote John Houseman. "A neurotic drinker and a compulsive gambler, he was also one of the most intelligent, informed, witty, humane and charming men I have ever known." Orson Welles told Peter Bogdanovich that "Nobody was more miserable, more bitter, and funnier than Mank ... a perfect monument of self-destruction. But, you know, when the bitterness wasn't focused straight at you, he was the best company in the world."

Welles admired Mankiewicz, and had met him in New York in 1938 at the time of the Mercury Theatre's Broadway successes. In September 1939 Welles visited Mankiewicz while he was hospitalized in Los Angeles after a car accident, and offered him a job writing scripts for the Mercury Theatre's show on CBS radio, The Campbell Playhouse. "I felt it would be useless," Welles said later, "because of Mank's general uselessness many times in the studios. But I thought, 'We'll see what he comes up with.'" Mankiewicz proved very useful, particularly working with Houseman as editor, and wrote five scripts for Campbell Playhouse shows broadcast between November 12, 1939, and March 17, 1940. (Note: Only four of the five scripts reached the air: "The Murder of Roger Ackroyd", "Dodsworth", "Vanity Fair" and "Huckleberry Finn".) Houseman and Welles were partners in the Mercury Theatre, but when Mercury productions moved from New York to California the partnership ended and Houseman became an employee, working primarily as supervising editor on the radio shows. In December 1939, after a violent quarrel with Welles over finances, Houseman resigned and returned to New York. To Welles, his departure was a relief.

In late December, the executive board of RKO Pictures all but ordered studio chief George J. Schaefer to stop paying salaries to the Mercury Productions staff until Welles submitted an acceptable script and set a start date for filming. Over the next five weeks Welles spent many long evenings brainstorming plot ideas in the bedroom of the small rented house where Mankiewicz was in traction with his shattered leg. Mankiewicz testified in a court proceeding a few years later that the idea for the film began with a March of Time-style sequence that set out the life of a particular character whose life would then be the subject of the film. Welles later said the germinal idea was to create a posthumous portrait of a man through many points of view, in the recollections of those who knew him. (Note: Geraldine Fitzgerald claimed to have suggested the multiple-points-of-view structure to Welles. Soon after Citizen Kane was released, she reportedly told him, "You know, that's taken from that idea I gave you," to which Welles replied, "I don't want you talking about it.") "I'd been nursing an old notion," Welles told Bogdanovich, "the idea of telling the same thing several times—and showing exactly the same thing from wholly different points of view. Basically, the idea Rashomon used later on. Mank liked it, so we started searching for the man it was going to be about. Some big American figure—couldn’t be a politician, because you’d have to pinpoint him. Howard Hughes was the first idea. But we got pretty quickly to the press lords."

Welles and Mankiewicz soon settled on the idea of using newspaper magnate William Randolph Hearst as their central character. By late January their disagreements over plot details were more frequent and their collaboration less creative. "That's why I left him on his own, finally," Welles said later, "because we'd started to waste too much time haggling." In February 1940, Welles arranged a lunch at New York's 21 Club and persuaded Houseman to return to California. He was hired to supervise Mankiewicz as he put a rough draft on paper.

On February 19, 1940, Mankiewicz signed a contract with Mercury Productions to work on the screenplay. He would receive $1,000 a week for his work as long as he was not "incapacitated by illness or any other reasons", and would be paid a $5,000 bonus on delivery of the script. Mankiewicz was to receive no credit for his work as he was hired as a script doctor; a similar clause was present in the writers' contracts for The Campbell Playhouse. Mankiewicz was advised by his agents, Columbia Management of California, and before he signed the contract it was again made clear that all credit for his work belonged to Welles and the Mercury Theatre, the "author and creator". Welles hesitated to officially agree to give Mankiewicz credit. His contract with RKO stated that the film would be produced, directed, performed and written by Welles, and his "boy wonder" persona had great publicity value for the studio. Welles's attorney, Arnold Weissberger, did not want to give RKO any cause to break Welles's contract should they wish to promote the film as solely his work. The contract with Mankiewicz left the matter of his receiving credit open; Welles's correspondence with his lawyer indicated that he did not wish to deny credit to Mankiewicz.

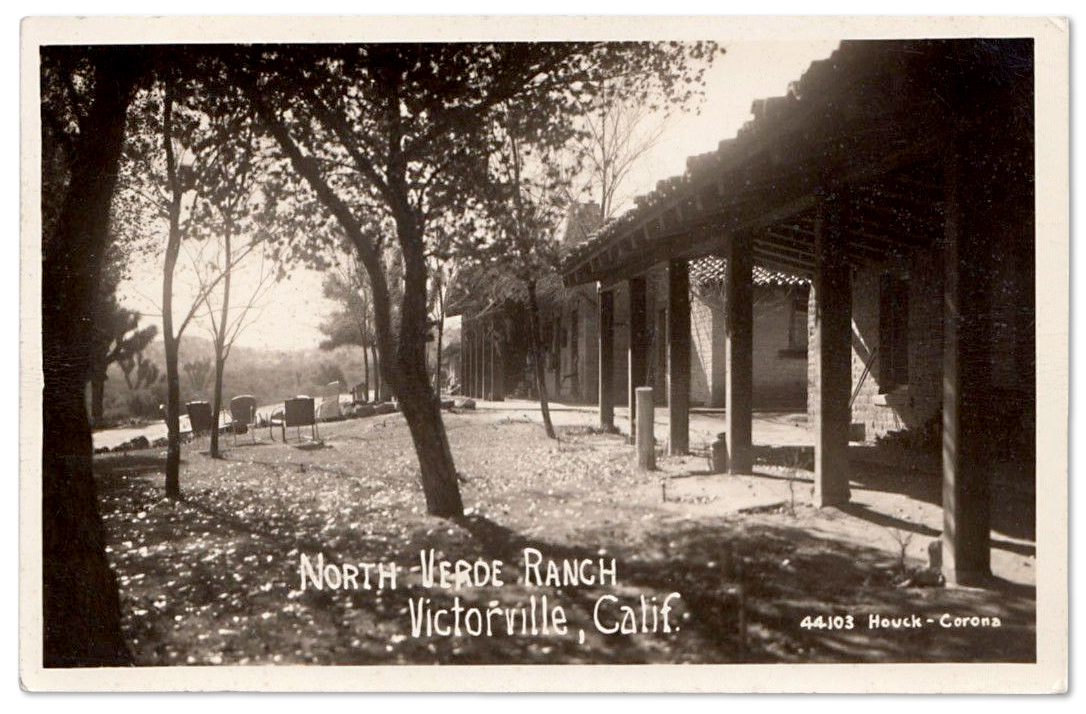
Mankiewicz and Houseman worked in seclusion at a historic ranch in Victorville, California, for 12 weeks.

After he came to agreement with Welles on the story line and character, Mankiewicz was given the job of writing the first draft that Welles could rework. In the last week of February or the first week of March 1940, Mankiewicz retreated to the historic North Verde Ranch (Note: The name of the Victorville ranch where Mankiewicz and Houseman worked changed in 1943, from the North Verde Ranch to its present name, the Kemper Campbell Ranch.) (now Kemper Campbell Ranch) on the Mojave River in Victorville, California, to begin working on the script. Welles wanted the work done as inconspicuously as possible, and the ranch offered the additional advantage of prohibiting alcohol. But Mankiewicz went into town daily, with John Houseman and, "was allowed one drink per night at the Green Spot Cafe bar". Mankiewicz was accompanied by a nurse, secretary Rita Alexander, Houseman, and a 300-page rough script of the project that Welles had written. The preliminary work consisted of dialogue and some camera instructions. Author Clinton Heylin wrote that Mankiewicz "… probably believed that Welles had little experience as an original scriptwriter … [and] may even have felt that John Citizen, USA, Welles's working title, was a project he could make his own."

Mankiewicz and Houseman worked together in seclusion at the ranch for 12 weeks. Houseman was to serve as editor, Carringer noted, "but part of his job was to ride herd on Mankiewicz, whose drinking habits were legendary and whose screenwriting credentials unfortunately did not include a reputation for seeing things through." There was continual communication with Welles, and Houseman often travelled to Los Angeles to confer with him. Welles visited the ranch occasionally to check on their progress and offer direction. With his own secretary, Katherine Trosper, Welles was reworking the draft pages in Hollywood. These pages were given to RKO script supervisor Amalia Kent, who broke the material down in continuity form for the production units. Welles respected her for her service on the unproduced Heart of Darkness script. Welles came to suspect that Houseman had turned Mankiewicz against him. "When Mank left for Victorville, we were friends. When he came back, we were enemies," Welles told biographer Richard Meryman. "Mank always needed a villain."

== Ideas and collaboration ==
For some time, Mankiewicz had wanted to write a screenplay about a public figure—perhaps a gangster—whose story would be told by the people who knew him. In the mid-1930s Mankiewicz had written the first act of an unproduced play about John Dillinger, titled The Tree Will Grow. "It was something [Mankiewicz] had been thinking about for years," Houseman wrote, “the idea of telling a man’s private life (preferably one that suggested a recognizable American figure), immediately following his death, through the intimate and often incompatible testimony of those who had known him at different times and in different circumstances.”

Welles himself had worked with the concept. As a teenager in 1932 he wrote a play about the life of abolitionist John Brown called Marching Song. Like that of Citizen Kane, the play's plot is structured around a journalist attempting to understand Brown by interviewing people who knew him and have different perspectives on him. The plot device of the unseen journalist Thompson in Citizen Kane is also reminiscent of the unseen Marlow in Welles's proposed film Heart of Darkness, in which the narrator and audience share the point of view. "Orson was from Chicago," said the Mercury Theatre's Richard Wilson, "and I believe he was as much influenced by Samuel Insull and Colonel Robert McCormick as he was by the figure of Hearst." Roger Hill, head of the Todd Seminary for Boys and Welles's mentor and lifelong friend, wrote that Welles once told him about a project he was considering: "He had outlined to me, years earlier, a plan for a stage play based on the life of an American tycoon who would be a composite of Insull, McCormick and Hearst." Hill said that even as a boy Welles was interested in the lives of the controversial tycoons: "He sensed, even then, the theatrical impact that could be gained in assaulting, and possibly toppling, giants," wrote Brady.

Welles did not know Hearst, but he knew much about him through drama critic Ashton Stevens. He also said that his father and Hearst knew each other. When Welles arrived in Hollywood in 1939 everyone was talking about Aldous Huxley's new book, After Many a Summer Dies the Swan, a novel that dealt with the film colony and seemed to be a portrait of Hearst. Welles was invited to celebrate Huxley's birthday at a party where the consensus was that the book could never be made into a film due to Hearst's influence. How much Huxley's book influenced Welles's choice of subject is unknown; Brady wrote that "a more personal coincidence, however, might have helped fuel the idea." Welles's first wife Virginia moved to Los Angeles shortly after their divorce, and on May 18, 1940, she married screenwriter Charles Lederer, favorite nephew of Hearst's mistress Marion Davies. (Note: Welles and Lederer later became great friends.)

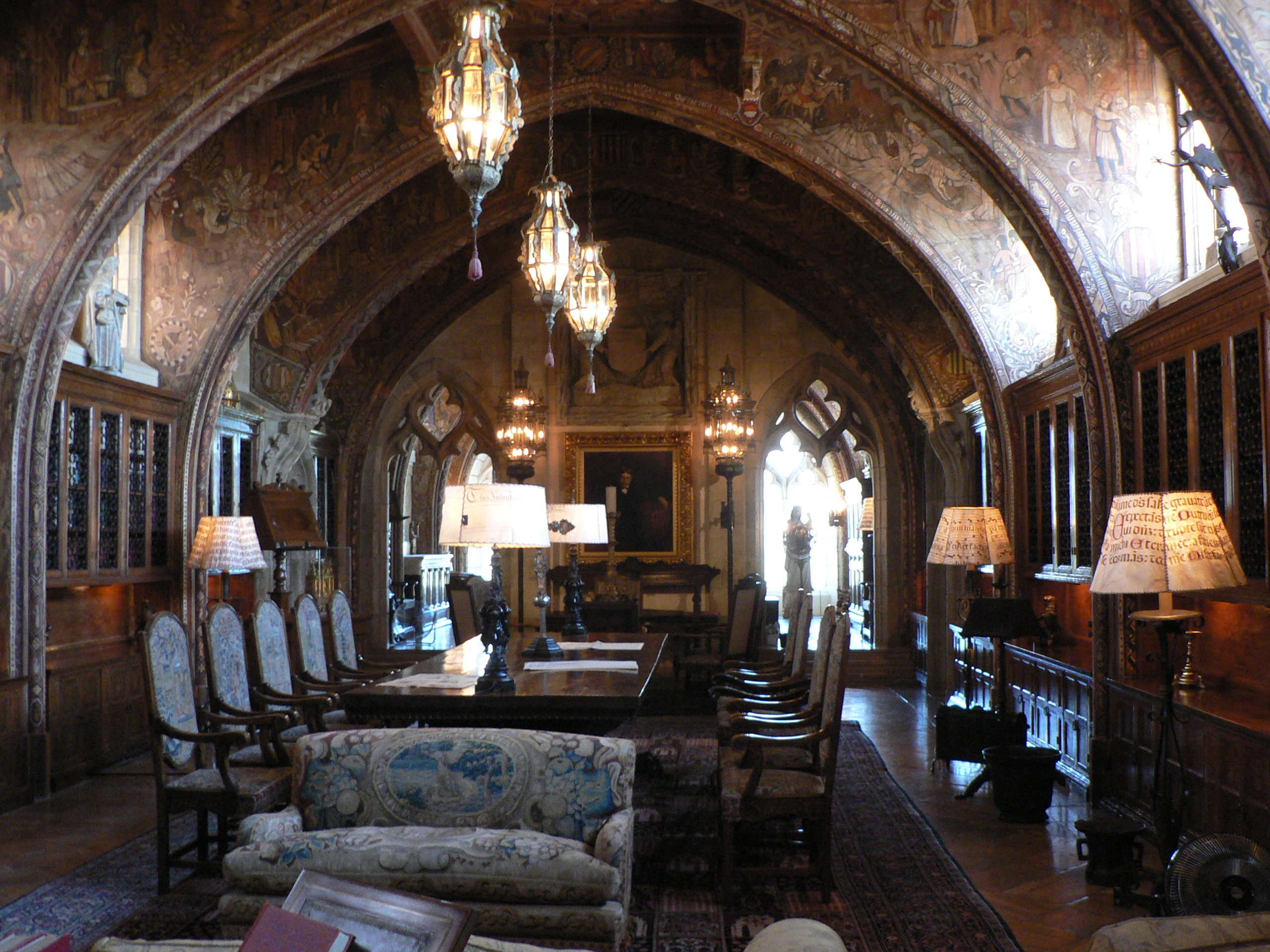
Mankiewicz was welcomed into Hearst's private office at San Simeon, where he mingled with Arthur Brisbane and Walter Winchell while Hearst presided over his empire.

In his earlier years as a journalist, Mankiewicz sought political reporters who kept him up on gossip about Hearst, and he had even started to write a play about him. Soon after moving to Hollywood in 1926, Mankiewicz met Hearst and Davies through his friendship with Lederer. "There were two castes in Hollywood," wrote Meryman, "those who had been guests at San Simeon and those who had not." Mankiewicz and his wife were part of the social set invited to Hearst Castle on several occasions. They were always given the same apartment in La Casa del Monte guest cottage—"like a little castle of our own," said Sara Mankiewicz. A celebrated wit, Mankiewicz was valued for his conversation and was seated near his hosts at dinner. He respected Hearst's knowledge and was privileged to be invited to his private office where he mingled with Hearst's editors and columnists. "For the first time Herman's Hollywood pleasure merged with his political scholarship", wrote Meryman.

Described by biographer Simon Callow as "a keen student of power and its abuses", Mankiewicz was fascinated by Hearst, and Hearst in turn was interested in the former journalist with so much political knowledge. Mankiewicz and Lederer delighted in concocting facsimile newspapers that needled Hearst and his publications, for the amusement of Hearst and Davies. By 1936, however, Mankiewicz was no longer welcome in Hearst's circle due to his drinking and political arguments. "Mankiewicz, nursing his resentment, had subsequently become obsessed by both Hearst and Davies," Callow wrote, "collecting stories about them the way small boys collect stamps."

== Scripting ==
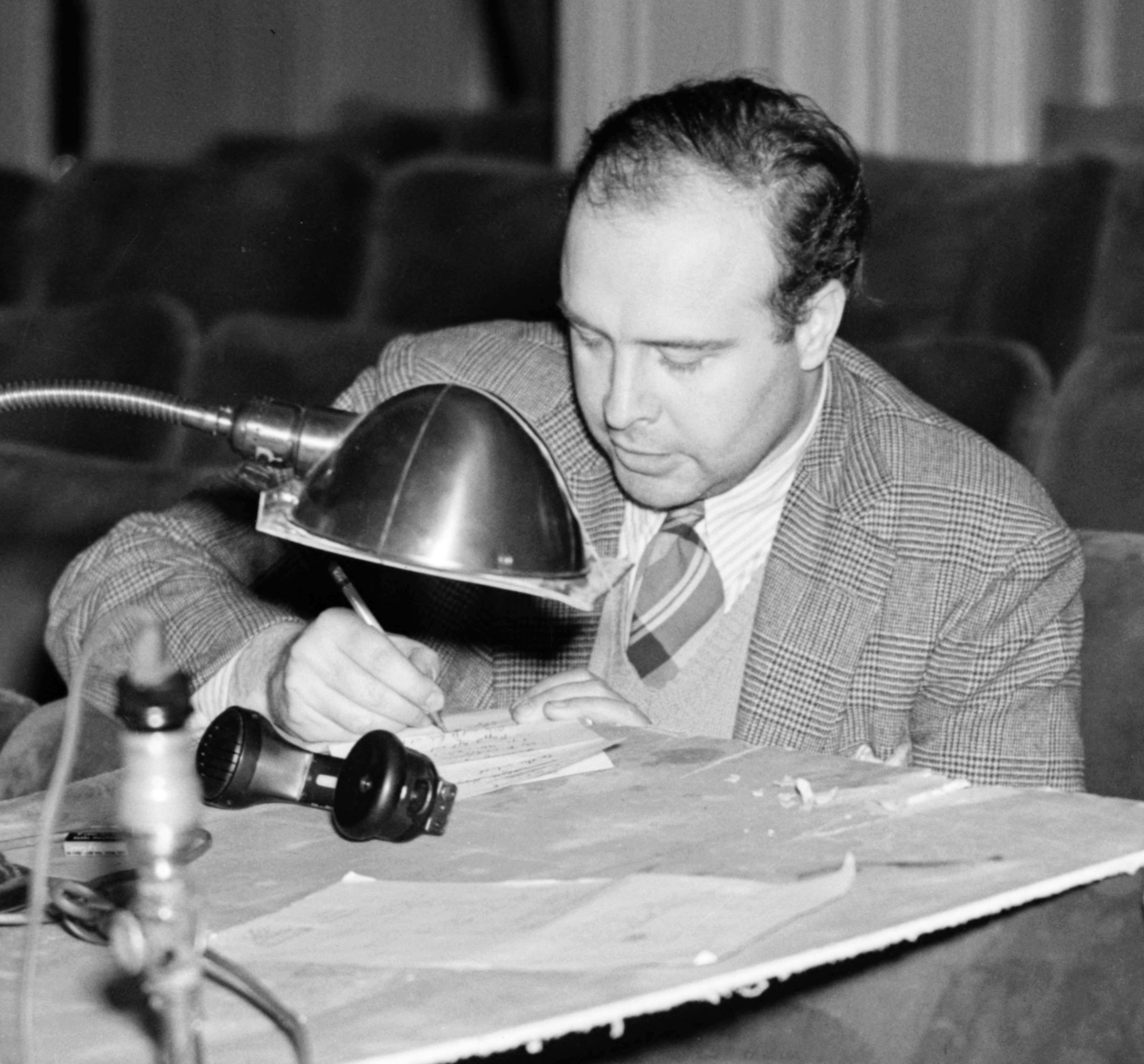
John Houseman helped write drafts of the script and later went so far as to say that Welles "never wrote a word". (Note: "[Welles] claims he wrote a parallel script," Houseman told Leaming. "That's all bullshit. He never wrote a word. I can tell you positively he didn't." Leaming notes, "This assertion will seem odd to anyone who has examined Houseman's personal papers deposited at UCLA.")

During March, April and early May 1940, Mankiewicz dictated the screenplay, titled American. Welles re-wrote and revised an incomplete first draft given to him, dated April 16, and sent it back to Victorville. Forty-four revision pages dated April 28 were given to Welles. Mankiewicz and Houseman delivered the second draft, bearing a handwritten date of May 9, to Welles after finishing their work in Victorville. Mankiewicz immediately went to work on another project for MGM, (Note: For the next five weeks Mankiewicz wrote the first draft of the script for MGM's Comrade X and received no screen credit. He also continued to work on the script for Welles's picture, sending a partially reworked script in early June that was not used. At this time he obtained a copy of Welles's draft and sent it, with his complaints, to Houseman in New York. Houseman responded on June 16 that he liked most of Welles's new scenes.) and Houseman left for New York four days later.

"Despite Houseman's description of himself and Herman paring every excess out of American, it was 325 pages long and outrageously overwritten, even for a first draft," wrote Meryman. "Houseman blandly ignores this fact. He implies that American, with only the conventional amount of polishing, was what was filmed." (Note: For comparison purposes, author Harlan Lebo summarizes the plot of the original script, which "varies greatly from the finished film".) Welles had been editing and rewriting the script pages in Beverly Hills. With the Victorville script now in hand he cut it by some 75 pages, and added or revised more than 170 pages. "By far the most serious dramatic problem in American is its treatment of Kane," wrote Carringer. The RKO legal department warned Welles that it was too close a portrait of Hearst and that if the script was not changed a suit for libel or invasion of privacy was almost certain.

"There is a quality in the film—much more than a vague perfume—that was Mank and that I treasured," Welles said. "It was a kind of controlled, cheerful virulence … I personally liked Kane, but I went with that. And that probably gave the picture a certain tension, the fact that one of the authors hated Kane and one loved him. But in his hatred of Hearst, or whoever Kane was, Mank didn't have a clear enough image of who the man was. Mank saw him simply as an egomaniac monster with all these people around him." Mankiewicz had made a study of Hearst over many years, and he had firsthand knowledge as one of his frequent guests at San Simeon; but he also drew on published accounts about Hearst for the script. "He always denied it," wrote Carringer, "but coincidences between American and Ferdinand Lundberg's Imperial Hearst are hard to explain." Welles removed a great deal of Mankiewicz's Hearst material, but Lundberg would eventually file suit nevertheless. (Note: In 1947 Ferdinand Lundberg sued the creators of Citizen Kane for copyright infringement. In his November 1950 testimony Mankiewicz freely stated that he had read Imperial Hearst (1937) but insisted that he knew firsthand things that had appeared only in the book. The trial ended in a hung jury. RKO settled out of court.)

The fourth draft dated June 18 was the first to be titled Citizen Kane. The title was contributed by RKO studio chief George Schaefer, who was concerned that calling the film American would seem cynical and identify too closely with Hearst, whose newspapers included the American Weekly and the New York Journal-American. (Note: Welles said, "Citizen Kane came from George Schaefer … It's a great title. We'd sat around for months trying to think of a name for it. Mankiewicz couldn't, I couldn't, none of the actors—we had a contest on. A secretary came up with one that was so bad I'll never forget it: A Sea of Upturned Faces.") Mankiewicz and Houseman were put back on the Mercury payroll June 18 – July 27, and continued to help revise the script. Dated July 16, 1940, the final shooting script was 156 pages. "After seven complete revisions, Welles finally had what he wanted," wrote Brady. Carringer summarized:

Mankiewicz (with assistance from Houseman and with input from Welles) wrote the first two drafts. His principal contributions were the story frame, a cast of characters, various individual scenes, and a good share of the dialogue. … Welles added the narrative brilliance—the visual and verbal wit, the stylistic fluidity, and such stunningly original strokes as the newspaper montages and the breakfast table sequence. He also transformed Kane from a cardboard fictionalization of Hearst into a figure of mystery and epic magnificence. Citizen Kane is the only major Welles film on which the writing credit is shared. Not coincidentally, it is also the Welles film that has the strongest story, the most fully realized characters, and the most carefully sculpted dialogue. Mankiewicz made the difference.

Welles called Mankiewicz's contribution to the script "enormous". He summarized the screenwriting process: "The initial ideas for this film and its basic structure were the result of direct collaboration between us; after this we separated and there were two screenplays: one written by Mr. Mankiewicz, in Victorville, and the other, in Beverly Hills, by myself. … The final version of the screenplay … was drawn from both sources."

In 1969, when he was interviewed for the official magazine of the Directors Guild of America, Houseman concurred with Welles's description of the scripting process: "He [Welles] added a great deal of material himself, and later he and Herman had a dreadful row over the screen credit. As far as I could judge, the co-billing was correct. The Citizen Kane script was the product of both of them."

But at the same time, Houseman was stirring controversy, lunching with film critic Pauline Kael and giving Mankiewicz total credit for the creation of the script for Citizen Kane. Carringer wrote that "in his lengthy account of the Victorville interlude, Houseman gives the impression that Mankiewicz started out with a clean slate, and that virtually everything in the Victorville drafts is Mankiewicz's original invention." (Note: Act Three of Houseman's 1972 autobiography Run Through is dedicated "to the memory of Herman Mankiewicz".) Houseman would openly say that Mankiewicz deserved sole credit for writing the film for many years—right up until his death—without explaining the contradictions present even in his own personal papers.

== Authorship ==
One of the long-standing controversies about Citizen Kane has been the authorship of the screenplay. Mankiewicz was enraged when an August 1940 column by Louella Parsons quoted Welles as saying, " … and so I wrote Citizen Kane." When RKO released the film in May 1941, the souvenir program included a double-page spread depicting Welles as "the four-most personality of motion pictures … author, producer, director, star." Mankiewicz wrote his father, "I'm particularly furious at the incredibly insolent description of how Orson wrote his masterpiece. The fact is that there isn't one single line in the picture that wasn't in writing—writing from and by me—before ever a camera turned."

Mankiewicz had seen rushes of the film shortly before this and said he was unhappy with the footage. However, Mankiewicz's assessment of the footage was full of contradictions. He told Welles that there were "not enough standard movie conventions being observed" and that he disliked the theatricality and lack of close-ups in the film. But Mankiewicz also called the footage "magnificent" and said he liked it "from an aesthetical point of view." He also said that he thought the audience would not understand the film.

Mankiewicz began threatening Welles to get credit for the film. This included threatening to post full-page ads in trade papers and getting his friend Ben Hecht to write an exposé about their collaboration in The Saturday Evening Post. Mankiewicz also threatened to go to the Screen Writers Guild and claim full credit for writing the entire script by himself. Welles biographer Barbara Leaming believes that Mankiewicz reacted this way out of fear of getting no credit at all.

After lodging a protest with the Screen Writers Guild, Mankiewicz withdrew it, then vacillated. The question was resolved in January 1941 when RKO awarded Mankiewicz credit. The guild credit form listed Welles first, Mankiewicz second. Welles's assistant Richard Wilson said that the person who circled Mankiewicz's name in pencil, then drew an arrow that put it in first place, was Welles. The official credit reads, "Screenplay by Herman J. Mankiewicz and Orson Welles".

Mankiewicz's rancor toward Welles grew over the remaining 12 years of his life. Welles's irritation with Mankiewicz passed quickly, and he spoke of him with fondness.

"One of the things that bound his friends to him was his extraordinary vulnerability," Welles told Mankiewicz's biographer. "He liked the attention he got as a great, monumental self-destructing machine. That was his role, and he played it to the hilt. He was a performer, as I think all very successful personalities are. He couldn’t be affectionate or loving outside his family. You never felt you were basking in the warmth of his friendship. So it was his vulnerability that brought the warmth out from the friends. And people loved him. Loved him. That terrible vulnerability. That terrible wreck."

Welles further said this to Mankiewicz's biographer: "I have only one real enemy in my life that I know about, and that is John Houseman. Everything begins and ends with that hostility behind the mandarin benevolence."

== "Raising Kane" ==
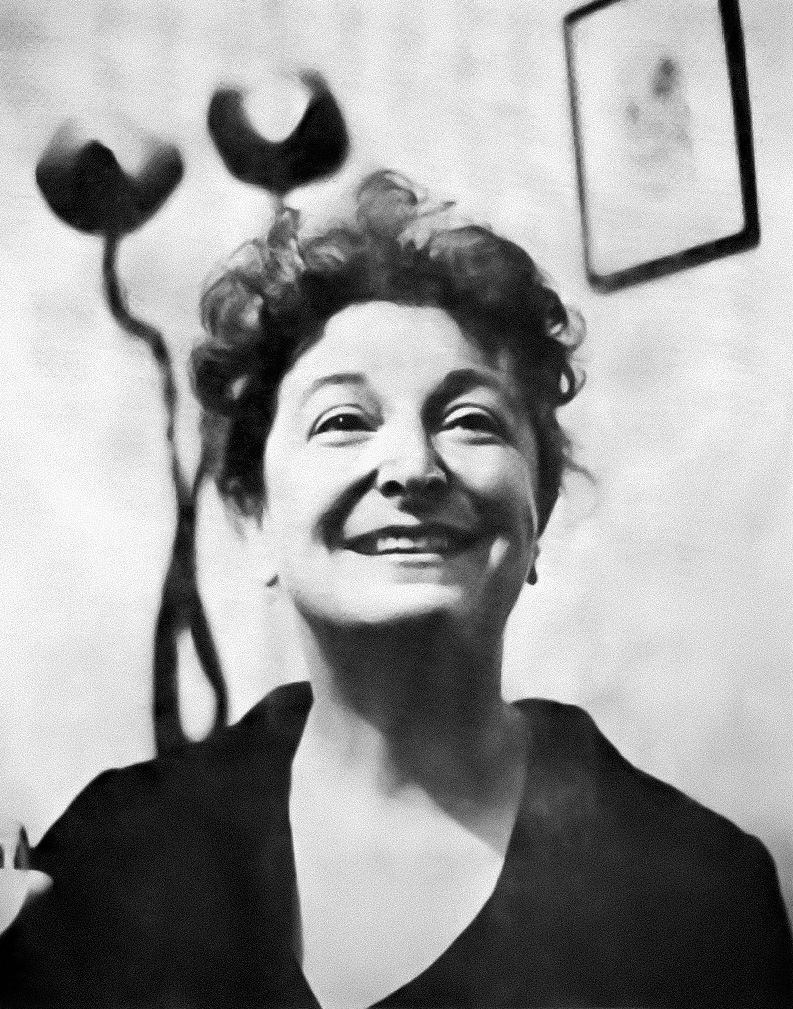
Film critic Pauline Kael's 1971 essay created a controversy by claiming Mankiewicz deserved full credit for writing the screenplay.

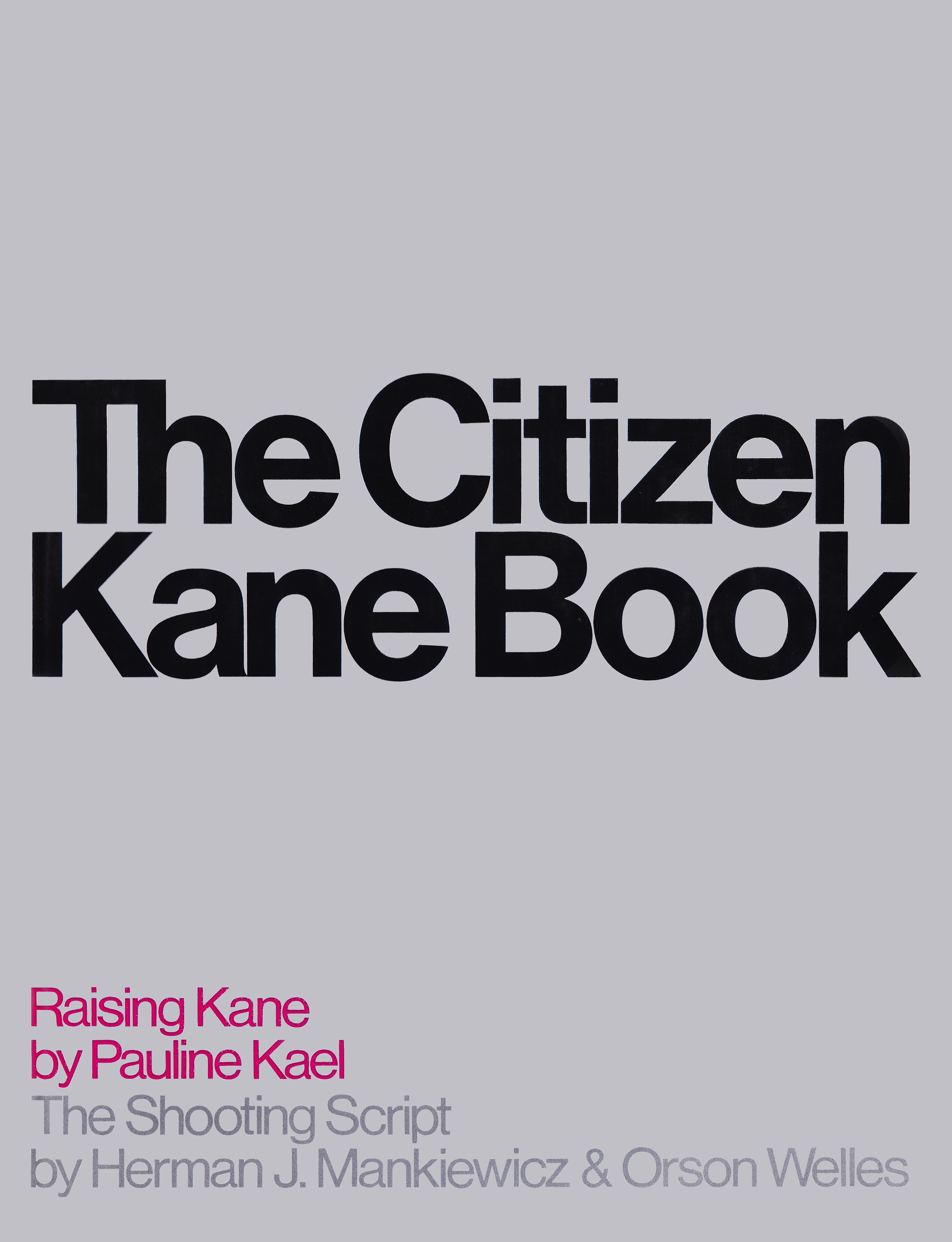
"Raising Kane" was published in The New Yorker and in The Citizen Kane Book (1971).

Questions over the authorship of the Citizen Kane screenplay were revived in 1971 by influential film critic Pauline Kael, whose controversial 50,000-word essay "Raising Kane" was printed in two consecutive issues of The New Yorker and subsequently as a long introduction to the shooting script in The Citizen Kane Book. Kael's unacknowledged primary source was Houseman. (Note: In May 1969 Houseman recorded in his journal that he had a long lunch with Kael, who "seems highly agitated over her 'discovery' of Herman Mankiewicz. I gave her all the information I had and will send her more.")

"The major focus of Kael's essay is its defense and celebration of screenwriter Herman J. Mankiewicz as the principal, neglected creative force behind Kane," wrote film critic Jonathan Rosenbaum. "According to Kael, the script was written almost entirely by Mankiewicz, and Welles had actively plotted to deprive him of any screen credit." The mainstream press accepted Kael's essay—an extension of her dispute with Andrew Sarris and the auteur theory—based on her credibility as one of the country's top film critics.

"Raising Kane" angered many critics, most notably Peter Bogdanovich, a close friend of Welles who rebutted Kael's claims in "The Kane Mutiny", an October 1972 article for Esquire. (Note: "The by-line carried only my name," Bogdanovich later wrote, "but Orson had taken a strong hand in revising and rewriting. Why shouldn't he? He was fighting for his life.") (Note: "The Kane Mutiny" also appears in Focus on Orson Welles (1976), edited by Ronald Gottesman, and is excerpted in Bogdanovich's new introduction to the 1998 edition of This is Orson Welles.) The article included the revelation that Kael used the research and interviews of Dr. Howard Suber, an assistant professor at UCLA where she was then a guest lecturer, without ever crediting him.

Other rebuttals included articles by Sarris, Joseph McBride and Rosenbaum, interviews with George Coulouris and Bernard Herrmann that appeared in Sight & Sound, a definitive study of the scripts by Carringer and remarks in Welles biographies by Leaming and Brady. Rosenbaum's 2020 preface to his earlier essay also references the fact that the 1972 Bogdanovich piece was ghost-written by Welles himself. Rosenbaum also reviewed the controversy in his editor's notes to This is Orson Welles (1992).

"Orson was vigorously defended," wrote biographer Barton Whaley, "but in less prominently placed articles; so, again, the damage was immense and permanent."

== "The Scripts of Citizen Kane" ==
Questions of authorship were further clarified with Carringer's 1978 essay, "The Scripts of Citizen Kane". (Note: First published in Critical Inquiry, "The Scripts of Citizen Kane" was described by Rosenbaum as "the definitive piece of scholarship on the authorship of Kane—and sadly one of the least well known". He wrote that many biographers may wrongly assume that Carringer included all of its facts in his later book, The Making of Citizen Kane.) Carringer studied the collection of script records—"almost a day-to-day record of the history of the scripting"—that was then still intact at RKO. He reviewed all seven drafts and concluded that "the full evidence reveals that Welles's contribution to the Citizen Kane script was not only substantial but definitive." Carringer finally assessed that it was Welles who transformed the script “from a solid basis for a story into an authentic plan for a masterpiece.”

Carringer found that the issues raised by Kael rested on the evidence of an early draft of the screenplay, primarily written by Mankiewicz, which "elaborated the plot logic and laid down the overall story contours, established the main characters, and provided numerous scenes and lines that would eventually appear in one form or another in the film." At that stage of the scripting, Kane was a caricature of Hearst rather than the fully developed character of the final film. Carringer found clues in the second draft that Welles was guiding the script, and in the third draft he documented Welles's direct involvement and responsibility for the first major revisions. "That the subsequent installments are also attributable chiefly to Welles is indicated both by the circumstances and by the nature of the revisions," Carringer wrote.

Carringer observed that Citizen Kane is one of the few Welles projects based on an original story idea rather than an adaption of existing work. "Mankiewicz was hired to furnish him with what any good first writer ought to be able to provide in such a case: a solid, durable story structure on which to build," Carringer wrote. Welles then "adapted it with the same freedom and disregard for authority with which he adapt[ed] a Shakespeare play or a thriller by Nicholas Blake."

== Accolades ==
At the 14th Academy Awards, the screenplay for Citizen Kane received the Academy Award for Best Original Screenplay, shared by Herman J. Mankiewicz and Orson Welles.
