= Rae Kidd =

American film actress

Rae Kathleen Kidd (June 15, 1917 – April 2, 1962) was an American film actress who played the lead role (of Rae Lane) in the controversial nudist film The Unashamed (1938). The film has been studied for its commentary on race, class, and the possibility of idylls within 20th Century life.

She claimed to be a descendant of the pirate William "Captain" Kidd. She married her first husband, Enos R. Wicher, while both were students at the University of Wisconsin in 1935. They divorced in 1937.

== Notes ==
- See Beyond the Pale: Nudism, Race, and Resistance in "The Unashamed", Robert M. Payne, Film Quarterly, Vol. 54, No. 2 (Winter, 2000–2001), pp. 27–40.

In relationship with, and later married, Rosslyn J. Cowen, Jr. (11/23/12-2/2/88), who played the film's ventriloquist. He was a production assistant, whose duties included still photography. They had four children, and divorced in early 1950s.
