= Deeper into Movies =

1973 collection of film reviews by Pauline Kael

- Author: Pauline Kael
- Language: English
- Genre: Film critique
- Publisher: Little, Brown and Company
- Publication date: 1973
- Publication place: United States

Deeper Into Movies is a collection of 1969 to 1972 movie reviews by American film critic Pauline Kael, published by Little, Brown and Company in 1973. It was the fourth collection of her columns; these were originally published in The New Yorker. It won the U.S. National Book Award in category Arts and Letters.

== Summary ==
Containing reviews of individual films from the aforementioned time period, the collection also includes a long essay entitled "Numbing the Audience".

== Directors ==
In the anthology, Kael praises the merits of then up-and-coming directors Robert Altman and Francis Ford Coppola, in her reviews of MASH, McCabe & Mrs. Miller, and The Godfather. She pans Stanley Kubrick and his A Clockwork Orange for its brutality and moral convolutions.

== Print Status ==
The book is now out-of-print in the United States, but is still published in the United Kingdom by Marion Boyars Publishers, an independent publishing company.

== Films reviewed ==
- Butch Cassidy and the Sundance Kid
- Bob & Carol & Ted & Alice
- Oh! What a Lovely War
- The Bed Sitting Room
- A Walk with Love and Death
- de Sade
- High School
- The Royal Hunt of the Sun
- The Madwoman of Chaillot
- Paint Your Wagon
- Lions Love
- The Sterile Cuckoo
- The Secret of Santa Vittoria
- Duet for Cannibals
- Coming Apart
- Goodbye, Mr. Chips
- Adalen 31
- Hail, Hero!
- In the Year of the Pig
- Downhill Racer
- The Arrangement
- La Femme Infidèle
- All the Loving Couples
- Popcorn
- The Comic
- Z
- Alfred the Great
- They Shoot Horses, Don't They?
- John and Mary
- Gaily, Gaily
- The Reivers
- Tell Them Willie Boy Is Here
- Topaz
- Hello, Dolly!
- On Her Majesty's Secret Service
- Marooned
- The Damned
- Hamlet
- A Boy Named Charlie Brown
- M*A*S*H
- Anne of the Thousand Days
- Patton
- Hospital
- The Milky Way
- The Molly Maguires
- The Kremlin Letter
- The Honeymoon Killers
- A Married Couple
- End of the Road
- Zabriskie Point
- The Looking Glass War
- Loving
- The Only Game in Town
- Start the Revolution Without Me
- The Magic Christian
- Tropic of Cancer
- Fellini Satyricon
- The Adventurers
- Airport
- The Boys in the Band
- Women in Love
- Trash
- The Baby Maker
- The Great White Hope
- Monte Walsh
- First Love
- Ice
- I Never Sang for My Father
- Goin' Down the Road
- This Man Must Die
- Little Fauss and Big Halsy
- C.C. and Company
- Burn!
- The Twelve Chairs
- Cromwell
- WUSA
- The Owl and the Pussycat
- Where's Poppa?
- The Private Life of Sherlock Holmes
- Song of Norway
- Ryan's Daughter
- Perfect Friday
- The Pizza Triangle
- Bombay Talkie
- Scrooge
- Groupies
- I Walk the Line
- The Confession
- The Act of the Heart
- Gimme Shelter
- Little Big Man
- Love Story
- Investigation of a Citizen Above Suspicion
- Husbands
- Alex in Wonderland
- Brewster McCloud
- There Was a Crooked Man...
- The Music Lovers
- Bed and Board
- Promise at Dawn
- The Last Valley
- Puzzle of a Downfall Child
- Little Murders
- The Hour of the Furnaces
- Doctors' Wives
- The Sporting Club
- The Garden of Delights
- Claire's Knee
- Wanda
- A New Leaf
- The Conformist
- The Andromeda Strain
- McCabe & Mrs. Miller
- Klute
- Carnal Knowledge
- The Anderson Tapes
- Sunday Bloody Sunday
- The Last Picture Show
- The Last Movie
- Skin Game
- The Trojan Women
- Murmur of the Heart
- The Début
- T.R. Baskin
- The French Connection
- Long Ago, Tomorrow
- Is There Sex After Death?
- Fiddler on the Roof
- El Topo
- Billy Jack
- Born to Win
- Going Home
- King Lear
- Man in the Wilderness
- Bedknobs and Broomsticks
