= I Lost It at the Movies =

1965 book by Pauline Kael

- First UK edition
- Author: Pauline Kael
- Genre: Film Critique
- Publisher: Jonathan Cape
- Publication date: 1965

I Lost It at the Movies is a 1965 compendium of movie reviews written by Pauline Kael, later a film critic from The New Yorker, from 1954 to 1991. The book was published prior to Kael's long stint at The New Yorker; as a result, the pieces in the book are culled from radio broadcasts that she did while she was at KPFA, as well as numerous periodicals, including Moviegoer, the Massachusetts Review, Sight and Sound, Film Culture, Film Quarterly and Partisan Review. It contains her negative review of the then-widely acclaimed West Side Story, glowing reviews of other movies such as The Golden Coach and Seven Samurai, and longer polemical essays such as her largely negative critical responses to Siegfried Kracauer's Theory of Film and Andrew Sarris's Film Culture essay "Notes on the Auteur Theory, 1962". The book was a bestseller upon its first release and is now published by Marion Boyars Publishers.

Kael's first book is characterized by an approach in which she would often quote contemporary critics such as Bosley Crowther and Dwight Macdonald as a springboard to debunk their assertions while advancing her own ideas. This approach was later abandoned in her subsequent reviews, but is notably referred to in Macdonald's book Dwight Macdonald On Movies (1969).

When an interviewer asked her in later years as to what she had "lost", as indicated in the title, Kael averred, "There are so many kinds of innocence to be lost at the movies."

== Contents ==
The book is divided into an introduction and four sections. These sections are entitled as such: I) Broadsides; II) Retrospective Reviews: Movies Remembered with Pleasure; III) Broadcasts and Reviews, 1961–1963; and IV) Polemics.

The introduction is entitled "Zeitgeist and Poltergeist; Or, Are Movies Going to Pieces?"

The contents of Section One (Broadsides):

- Fantasies of the Art-House Audience
- The Glamour of Delinquency
- Commitment and the Straitjacket
- Hud, Deep in the Divided Heart of Hollywood

Movies reviewed in Section Two (Retrospective Reviews):

- The Earrings of Madame de...
- The Golden Coach
- Smiles of a Summer Night
- La Grande Illusion
- Forbidden Games
- Shoeshine
- The Beggar's Opera
- Seven Samurai

Movies reviewed and titles of articles in Section Three (Broadcasts and Reviews):

- Breathless, and the Daisy Miller Doll
- The Cousins
- Canned Americana
- West Side Story
- L'avventura
- One, Two, Three
- The Mark
- Kagi
- The Innocents
- A View from the Bridge, and a Note on The Children's Hour
- The Day the Earth Caught Fire
- The Come-Dressed-as-the-Sick-Soul-of-Europe Parties: La notte, Last Year at Marienbad, La Dolce Vita
- A Taste of Honey
- Victim
- Lolita
- Shoot the Piano Player
- Jules and Jim
- Hemingway's Adventures of a Young Man
- Fires on the Plain
- Replying to Listeners
- Billy Budd
- Yojimbo
- Devi
- How the Long Distance Runner Throws the Race
- 8½: Confessions of a Movie Director

Contents of Section Four (Polemics):

- Is There a Cure for Film Criticism? Or, Some Unhappy Thoughts on Siegfried Kracauer's Theory of Film: The Redemption of Physical Reality
- Circles and Squares
- Morality Plays Right and Left

== Critical responses ==
In Dwight Macdonald On Movies, Macdonald includes a brief five-page review of I Lost It at the Movies. While he states in the beginning of his review that he has, on the whole, favorable sentiments towards the book, he nevertheless criticizes Kael for being "stronger on the intellectual side than on the aesthetic side" as well as her persistence in quoting other critics out of context. In the process, Macdonald confutes some of the assertions Kael makes about his own opinions regarding certain movies.

Dwight Macdonald writes:

What I like especially about Miss Kael's book is that it is written from the outside. The trouble with most film criticism today is that it isn't criticism. It is, rather, appreciation, celebration, information, and it is written by intellectuals who have come to be "insiders" in the sense that they are able to discourse learnedly about almost any movie without thinking much about whether it's any good - the very question must strike them as a little naive, and irrelevant - because they see it as a greater, or lesser, manifestation of the mystery, the godhead of Cinema.

Nevertheless, Macdonald goes on to say that some of the quotes that Kael utilizes in her reviews are often used incorrectly especially in regards to him, creating a distorted view of the opinions he had on certain movies such as Jules and Jim. He also questions the validity of some of her assessments of a few movies, including Hiroshima Mon Amour, 8½, and Last Year in Marienbad, stating that she is "perversely literal-minded" and comments upon "her ascetic insensibility to the sensual pleasures of cinema...when she dislikes the literary content." When Kael ponders in the book "it [is] difficult to understand why Dwight Macdonald with his dedication to high art sacrifices his time to them," Macdonald contends that he has always considered movies to be a high art. This, in a way, highlights the differences in their perspectives on movies: Pauline Kael sees movies as a fusion of pop and art elements (a mixture of lowbrow and highbrow), while Macdonald sees it in more highbrow terms. On the whole, Macdonald seems to respect her critical acumen, but not her methods.

A more adverse reaction comes from the auteurist Andrew Sarris, mainly as a result of the essay '"Circles and Squares", which was originally published in Film Quarterly. Sarris's reaction was in response to Kael's denunciation of the Auteur theory's merits, and has, in later years, occasionally jabbed at Kael's work. Examples of his critical observations are available in his books, e.g., The Primal Screen and Politics and Cinema. With the exception of "Circles and Squares", Kael has rarely responded. Notwithstanding Kael's unresponsive silence, this has gone down in film lore as the Sarris-Kael feud.

In reference to the title of the book, the critic Jonathan Rosenbaum wrote an article entitled "I Missed It at the Movies: Objections to Raising Kane" as a rebuttal to Kael's essay on Citizen Kane, which had been entitled "Raising Kane".

== In popular culture ==
In Lemony Snicket: The Unauthorized Autobiography, the book is referenced under the parody title I Lost Something at the Movies, and a short snippet of the made-up book is included. The name of the fictional author given, "Lena Pukalie", is also an anagram of Pauline Kael.
