= When the Lights Go Down =

When the Lights Go Down may refer to:

- When the Lights Go Down (book), a collection of movie reviews by the critic Pauline Kael
- "When the Lights Go Down" (Armand Van Helden song)
- "When the Lights Go Down" (Faith Hill song)
- "When the Lights Go Down", a song by Edie Brickell on the album Picture Perfect Morning
- "When the Lights Go Down", a song by Chad Brownlee on the album The Fighters
