= Kiss Kiss Bang Bang (book) =

1968 book by Pauline Kael

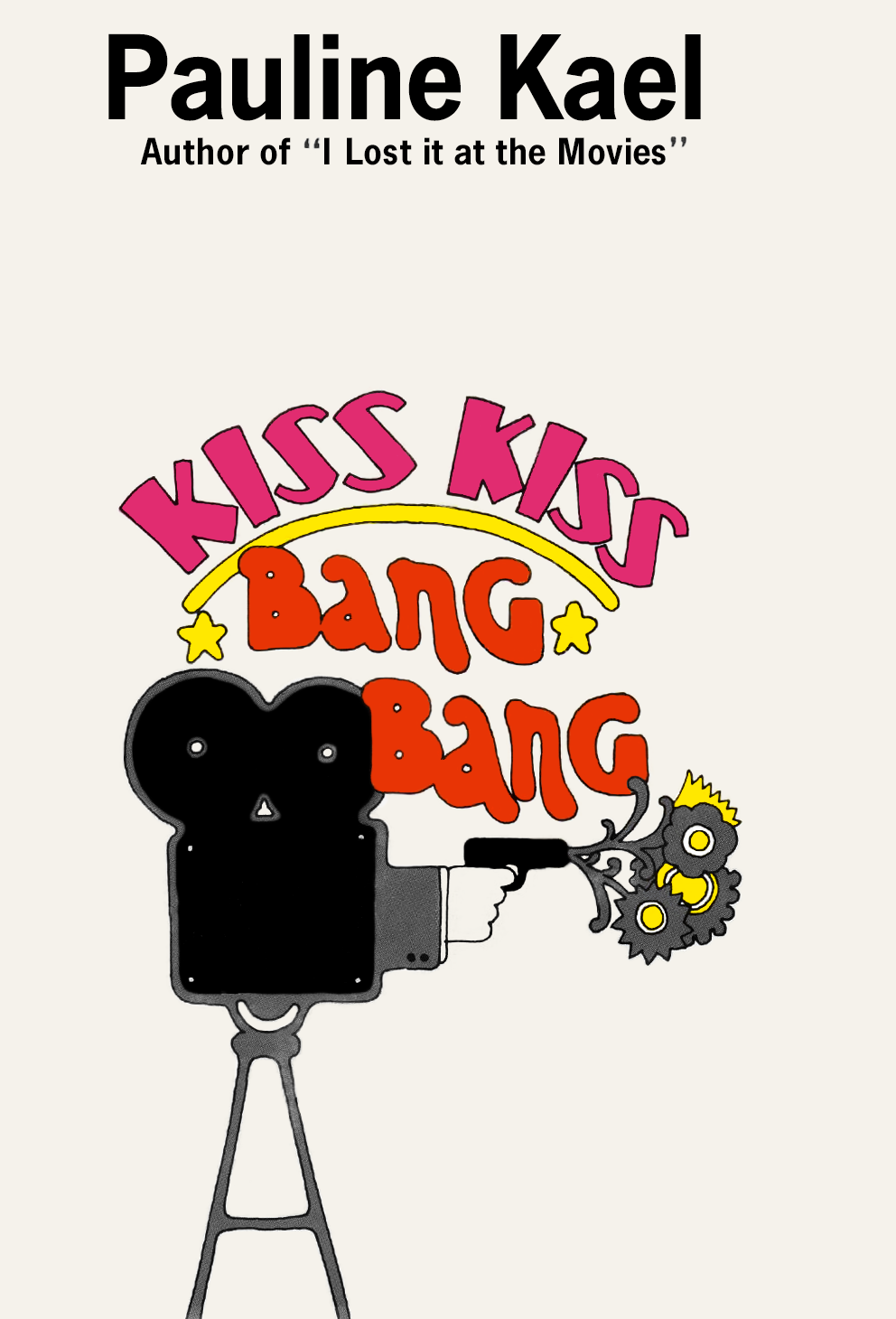
- First edition
- Author: Pauline Kael
- Publisher: Little, Brown
- Publication date: 1968

Kiss Kiss Bang Bang (1968) is a book by American film critic Pauline Kael, her second collections of reviews.

The book compiled reviews previously published from 1965 to 1968, in magazines including The Atlantic, Holiday, The New Yorker, Life, Mademoiselle, The New Republic, McCall's, and Vogue. The book features her review of The Sound of Music for McCall's which Kael notoriously dubbed "The Sound of Money," sparking many objections from readers. This controversial review is erroneously considered the reason why she was fired from her short-lived position as the McCall's film critic. In reality, her former editor reported how he enjoyed her iconoclastic review of The Sound of Music, but stated Kael was fired months later for "canning every commercial movie" of the era. The book also features a smaller collection of synopses (as opposed to full-length reviews) of little-known movies, some of which are also printed in Kael's 5001 Nights at the Movies.

In her note on the title which begins the book, Kael wrote of her essays: "[these are] perhaps the briefest statement imaginable of the basic appeal of movies. This appeal is what attracts us, and ultimately what makes us despair when we begin to understand how seldom movies are more than this." The title itself is a reference to the character of James Bond, who was often referred to as Mr Kiss Kiss, Bang Bang in international markets; the original theme song for the 1965 Bond film Thunderball was to have had this title.

The book has gone out-of-print in the United States, but is still published in the United Kingdom by the independent publishing company Marion Boyars Publishers.

== Contents ==
The book is divided into five sections, titled:

I) Trends;
II) The Making of The Group;
III) Reviews, 1965-1967;
IV) Careers;
V) The Movie Past.
