= Taking It All In =

Movie review collection by Pauline Kael

- Author: Pauline Kael
- Publication date: 1984
- ISBN: 0030693624

Taking It All In is the seventh collection of movie reviews by the critic Pauline Kael and contains the 150 film reviews she wrote for The New Yorker between June 9, 1980, and June 13, 1983. She writes in the Author's Note at the beginning of the collection that, "it was a shock to discover how many good ones there were", as well as observing that only a very few of the movies she liked were box office successes - E.T. the Extra-Terrestrial, Tootsie, Star Trek II: The Wrath of Khan. She laments that, "in the '80s, films that aren't immediate box office successes are instantly branded as losers, flops, bombs. Some of the movies that meant the most to me were in this doomed group - The Stunt Man, Pennies from Heaven, Blow Out, The Devil's Playground, Melvin and Howard, Shoot the Moon, Come Back to the Five and Dime, Jimmy Dean, Jimmy Dean."

The collection starts up after a gap of a year, part of which Kael spent in Los Angeles and what she learned during those months is summed up in the piece "Why Are Movies So Bad?" This essay, (in which she takes on the Hollywood money men whose love of swift and easy financial returns she believed led to the too many truly bad films on show at the time), is also included in the collection. ( "Why Are Movies So Bad? Or The Numbers").

The book is out-of-print in the United States, but is still published by Marion Boyars Publishers in the United Kingdom.

== Editions ==
- Henry Holt & Co., 1984, hardbound (ISBN 0030693624)
- Marion Boyars, 1986, paperback (ISBN 0714528412)
