= Film Quarterly =

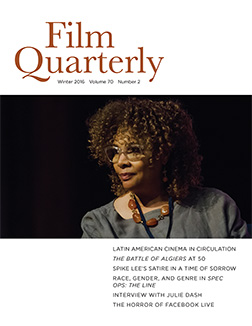
- Language: English

Publication details
- Former names: Hollywood Quarterly; The Quarterly of Film Radio and Television
- History: 1945–present
- Publisher: University of California Press (United States)
- Frequency: Quarterly

Standard abbreviations
- ISO 4: Film Q.

Indexing
- ISSN: 0015-1386
- LCCN: a45005270
- JSTOR: 00151386
- OCLC no.: 1569205

Links
- Journal homepage

Film Quarterly (FQ), published by University of California Press, is a journal devoted to the study of film, television, and visual media. When FQ was launched in 1945 (then called Hollywood Quarterly), it was considered "the first serious film journal in the United States, with those most interested in the subject at the helm."

In addition to providing scholarly analysis of international, Hollywood, and independent cinema, FQ (according to its website) "also revisits film classics; examines television, digital, and online media; covers film festivals; reviews recent books; and on occasion addresses installations, video games, and emergent technologies." Over the decades, the journal's contributors have included many distinguished film artists, critics, historians and theorists.

== History ==
Film Quarterly was first published in 1945 as Hollywood Quarterly. In 1951, it was renamed The Quarterly of Film, Radio, and Television. It has operated under its current title since 1958.

=== Hollywood Quarterly (1945–1951) ===
According to former FQ editor Brian Henderson, "Hollywood Quarterly was launched in 1945 as a joint venture of the Hollywood Writers Mobilization and the University of California Press. The association began as a wartime collaboration between educators and media workers in response to social needs occasioned by the war." Notable members on the Hollywood Quarterly editorial staff were playwright and screenwriter John Howard Lawson, psychologist Franklin Fearing, writer-director Abraham Polonsky, and Sylvia Jarrico, wife of screenwriter Paul Jarrico.

Polonsky helped set the intellectual tone of the journal by allowing his celebrated script for the radio drama, "The Case of David Smith", to be printed in the January 1946 issue. The following year, his essays on The Best Years of Our Lives (1946), Odd Man Out (1947), and Monsieur Verdoux (1947) went into greater depth about film theory and the filmmaking process than typical movie reviews. John Houseman would later write that Hollywood Quarterly "remains the first serious cultural publication in which members of the motion-picture industry were collectively involved."

=== Quarterly of Film, Radio, and Television (1951–1958) ===
After allegations in a House Un-American Activities Committee hearing that the editorial staff of Hollywood Quarterly had Communist leanings, the journal changed its name in 1951 to Quarterly of Film, Radio, and Television. The name change inaugurated a split from the Hollywood industry with which the journal had been closely partnered from its inception. The turn toward "politically safe" work in subsequent years led to editorial discord until August Frugé, then-director of UC Press, clarified the revised mission of the journal. Frugé drew inspiration from the European film journals Sight and Sound and Cahiers du Cinéma, noting in his memoir that "there was no American review comparable to these two, intellectual but not academic and devoted to film as art and not as communication. By accident we found ourselves with the means to publish one—if we chose and if we knew how."

=== Film Quarterly (1958–present) ===
Under the editorial guidance of Ernest Callenbach, the journal rebranded itself to bridge film criticism and scholarship, and was renamed Film Quarterly in Fall 1958. Its initial advisory board was composed of, among others, film scholar Andries Deinum; Gavin Lambert, a former editor of Sight and Sound who was then a screenwriter in Hollywood; Albert Johnson, a Bay Area-based film programmer and critic; and Colin Young, who taught film at UCLA and later became the first director of the British National Film and Television School. Callenbach remained Film Quarterly's editor until the Fall 1991 issue; he had overseen the production of 133 issues by the end of his tenure.

Ann Martin, previously with The New Yorker and American Film magazine, served as Film Quarterly editor from 1991 to 2006. Rob White, who had edited the British Film Institute's BFI Classics series, was in charge during 2006–2012. David Sterritt took over as guest editor for volume 66 in 2012–13.

Shortly after FQ's 40th anniversary, the University of California Press published a Film Quarterly anthology of its groundbreaking essays, co-edited by Brian Henderson and Ann Martin. Editorial board members Leo Braudy, Ernest Callenbach, Albert Johnson, Marsha Kinder, and Linda Williams participated in the conceptualization of the volume. In 2002, Ann Martin and Eric Smoodin (who was then the Film, Media, and Philosophy Acquisitions Editor at UC Press) co-edited a volume of highlights from the journal's Hollywood Quarterly (1945–1951) years.

From 2013 to 2023, film critic and historian B. Ruby Rich edited FQ. Rich's editorial vision particularly emphasized work that engaged with fresh approaches to film in a shifting digital media environment and a broadened view of cultural and critical approaches for both historical and contemporary work. Film Quarterly has emphasized the shifting forms and meanings the moving image has taken in the digital age and worked to expand its views of the field and the writers included in its pages. Special dossiers have focused on Joshua Oppenheimer's ground-breaking The Act of Killing, the cinema of Richard Linklater, the significance of Brazilian documentarian Edouardo Coutinho, the legacy of Chantal Akerman, and a collection of Manifestos for the current era. Cover stories have focused on such films and television series as Melvin Van Peebles' The Watermelon Man, Louis Massiah's The Bombing of Osage Avenue, Joey Soloway's Transparent, and Kenya Barris's Black-ish. Under Rich's editorship, Film Quarterly aimed to widen the scope of voices published in its pages, create a shared discourse for divergent platforms, and broaden the canon beyond traditional auteurism.

Rebecca Prime, who first joined the Film Quarterly staff in 2018 as associate editor, held the editor-in-chief position from 2023 to 2024.

J.M. Tyree is the current editor of Film Quarterly.

== Pauline Kael's involvement ==
For a brief time in the 1950s, Pauline Kael was considered for the role of editor. She was then a programmer at Cinema Guild, a repertory movie house in Berkeley, CA. However, Frugé and Kael did not share the same vision and so the position was offered to Callenbach instead. Beginning in 1961, a regular feature, "Films of the Quarter", appeared in which a group of well-known film critics—Pauline Kael, Dwight Macdonald, Stanley Kauffmann, Jonas Mekas and Gavin Lambert—discussed what they viewed as the best films of the prior three months. In the Spring 1963 issue, Kael famously attacked Andrew Sarris' auteur theory in her landmark article, "Circles and Squares". In the Summer 1963 issue, Sarris responded to her critique with his article, "The Auteur Theory and the Perils of Pauline".

In her bestselling book I Lost It at the Movies (1965), Kael included many of her articles, film reviews, and other material published in FQ during the 1961–65 period.

== Notable contributors ==
- Pedro Almodóvar
- Jean-Louis Baudry
- André Bazin
- David Bordwell
- Leo Braudy
- Noël Carroll
- Claire Clouzot
- Richard Corliss
- David Denby
- Manthia Diawara
- Richard Dyer
- Umberto Eco
- Mark Fisher
- Miriam Hansen
- Pauline Kael
- Laura Mulvey
- Bill Nichols
- B. Ruby Rich
- Jonathan Rosenbaum
- Andrew Sarris
- Paul Schrader
- Parker Tyler
- Linda Williams

== See also ==
- List of film periodicals
