= Raising Kane =

1971 essay by Pauline Kael

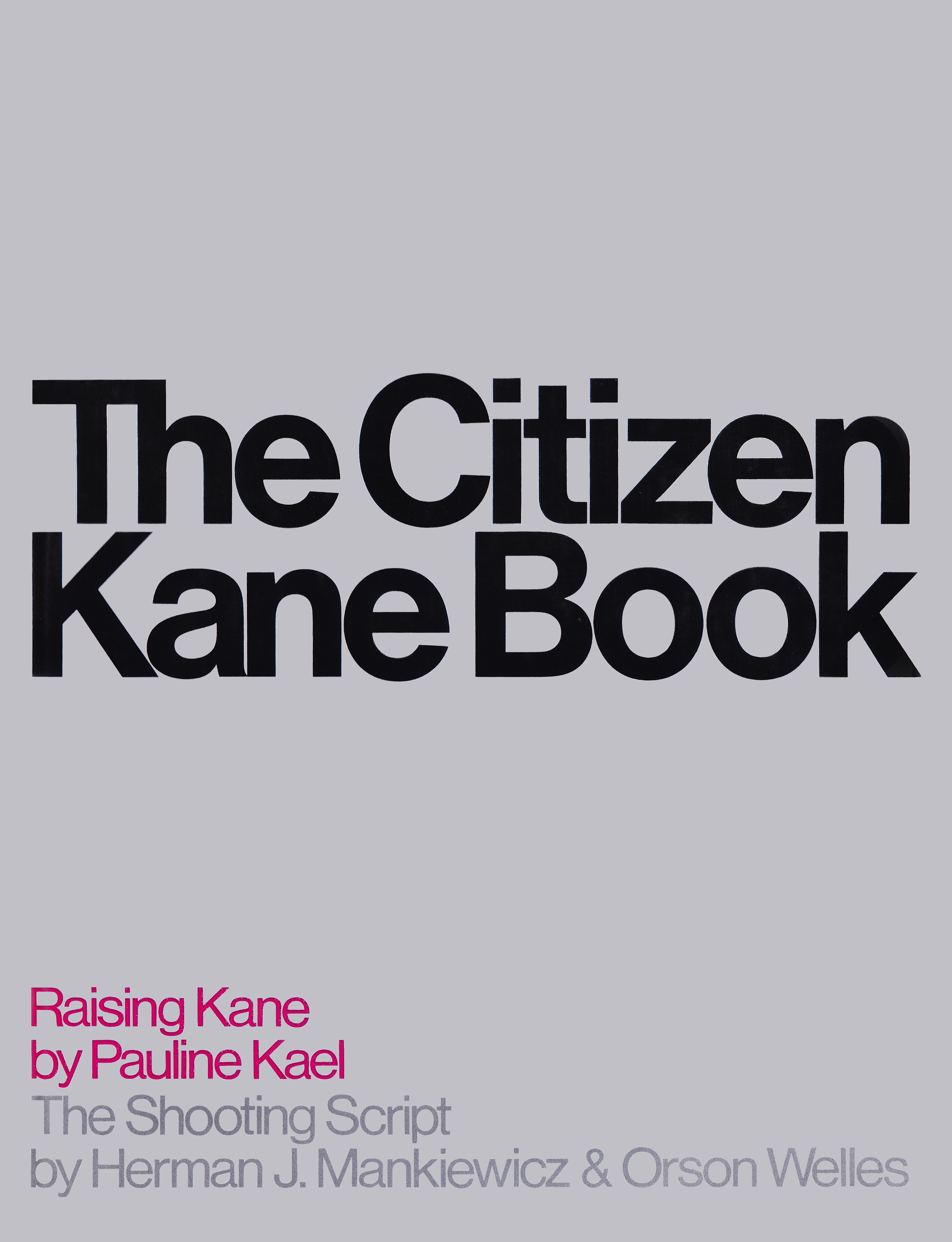
The Citizen Kane Book (1971), first book publication of Pauline Kael's "Raising Kane"

"Raising Kane" is a 1971 book-length essay by American film critic Pauline Kael, in which she revived controversy over the authorship of the screenplay for the 1941 film Citizen Kane. Kael celebrated screenwriter Herman J. Mankiewicz, first-credited co-author of the screenplay, and questioned the contributions of Orson Welles, who co-wrote, produced and directed the film, and performed the lead role. The 50,000-word essay was written for The Citizen Kane Book (1971), as an extended introduction to the shooting script by Mankiewicz and Welles. It first appeared in February 1971 in two consecutive issues of The New Yorker magazine. In the ensuing controversy, Welles was defended by colleagues, critics, biographers and scholars, but his reputation was damaged by its charges. The essay and Kael's assertions were later questioned after Welles's contributions to the screenplay were documented.

== Background ==
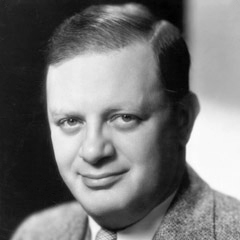
Mankiewicz

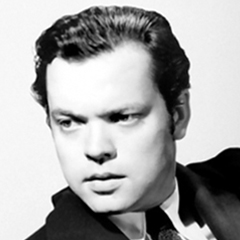
Welles

One of the long-standing controversies about Citizen Kane has been the authorship of the Academy Award–winning screenplay.Orson Welles conceived the project with screenwriter Herman J. Mankiewicz, who was writing radio plays for Welles's CBS Radio series, The Campbell Playhouse. Mankiewicz based the original outline on the life of William Randolph Hearst, whom he knew socially and came to hate after he was exiled from Hearst's circle.

In February 1940 Welles supplied Mankiewicz with 300 pages of notes and put him under contract to write the first draft screenplay under the supervision of John Houseman, Welles's former partner in the Mercury Theatre. Welles later explained, "I left him on his own finally, because we'd started to waste too much time haggling. So, after mutual agreements on storyline and character, Mank went off with Houseman and did his version, while I stayed in Hollywood and wrote mine." Taking these drafts, Welles drastically condensed and rearranged them, then added scenes of his own. The industry accused Welles of underplaying Mankiewicz's contribution to the script, but Welles countered the attacks by saying, "At the end, naturally, I was the one making the picture, after all—who had to make the decisions. I used what I wanted of Mank's and, rightly or wrongly, kept what I liked of my own."

The terms of the contract stated that Mankiewicz was to receive no credit for his work, as he was hired as a script doctor. Before he signed the contract Mankiewicz was particularly advised by his agents that all credit for his work belonged to Welles and the Mercury Theatre, the "author and creator". As the film neared release, however, Mankiewicz began threatening Welles to get credit for the film—including threats to place full-page ads in trade papers and to get his friend Ben Hecht to write an exposé for The Saturday Evening Post. Mankiewicz also threatened to go to the Screen Writers Guild and claim full credit for writing the entire script by himself.

After lodging a protest with the Screen Writers Guild, Mankiewicz withdrew it, then vacillated. The question was resolved in January 1941 when the studio, RKO Pictures, awarded Mankiewicz credit. The guild credit form listed Welles first, Mankiewicz second. Welles's assistant Richard Wilson said that the person who circled Mankiewicz's name in pencil, then drew an arrow that put it in first place, was Welles. The official credit reads, "Screenplay by Herman J. Mankiewicz and Orson Welles". Mankiewicz's rancor toward Welles grew over the remaining 12 years of his life.

== Research and writing ==
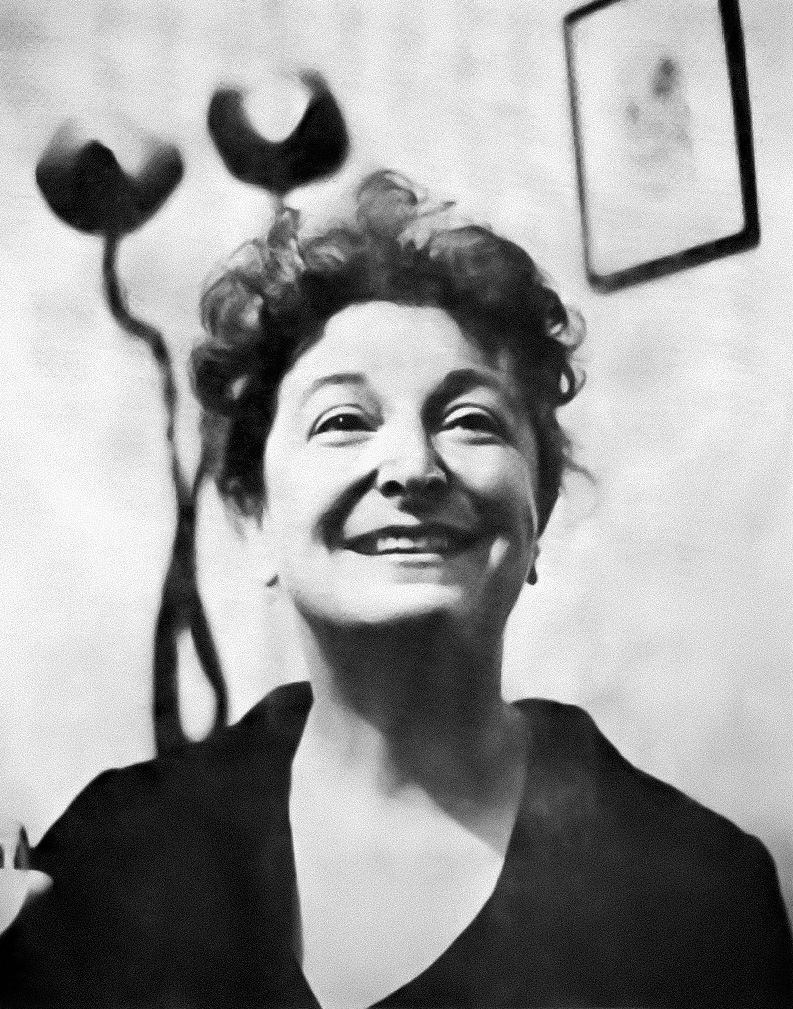
Pauline Kael

Here are Herman J. Mankiewicz, the brilliant, boozing, self-defeating writer who initiated the project; William Randolph Hearst who inspired it; Orson Welles who directed it and played its title role …

— dust jacket of The Citizen Kane Book (1971)

Questions over the authorship of the Citizen Kane screenplay were revived in 1971 by influential film critic Pauline Kael, whose controversial 50,000-word essay "Raising Kane" was commissioned as an introduction to the shooting script in The Citizen Kane Book, published in October 1971. The book-length essay first appeared in February 1971, in two consecutive issues of The New Yorker magazine.

Kael initially declined an offer from Bantam Books to write an introductory essay for a paperback edition of the Citizen Kane script, but later accepted. She received $375, half of the advance payment, in September 1968, and worked on the essay for more than a year. One of the contract provisions permitted separate publication of the essay in a magazine; earlier in 1968 Kael had been named one of two regular film critics for The New Yorker.

Kael approached the project as an opportunity to defend screenwriters, a long-abused class in the studio system. She had informally come to the opinion that Mankiewicz, a gifted screenwriter neglected for many years, had been the actual guiding force behind Citizen Kane. The essay became an extension of her dispute with critic Andrew Sarris, leading proponent of the auteur theory.

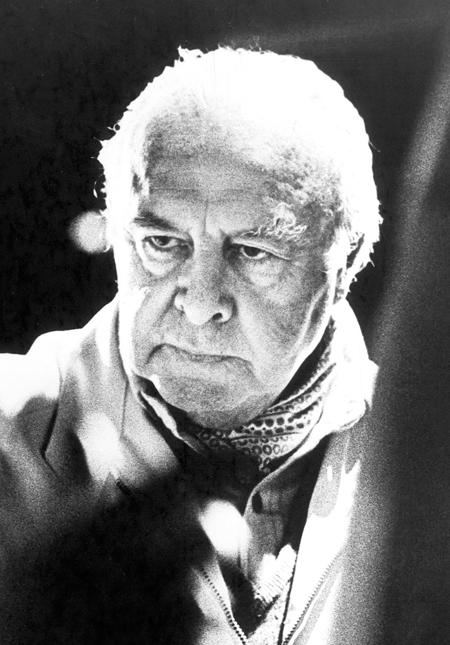
John Houseman

Kael's unacknowledged primary source was Houseman, with whom she began meeting in May 1969. (Note: In May 1969 Houseman recorded in his journal that he had a long lunch with Kael, who "seems highly agitated over her 'discovery' of Herman Mankiewicz. I gave her all the information I had and will send her more.") Houseman had helped Mankiewicz write drafts of the script and later went so far as to say that Welles "never wrote a word". (Note: "[Welles] claims he wrote a parallel script," Houseman told biographer Barbara Leaming. "That's all bullshit. He never wrote a word. I can tell you positively he didn't." Leaming notes, "This assertion will seem odd to anyone who has examined Houseman's personal papers deposited at UCLA.") Kael did considerable research on related topics in film history. "Unfortunately," wrote Brian Kellow in his 2011 biography of Kael, "she didn't do a great deal of research on the movie itself—partly because she learned that it had already been done."

Kael was then a guest lecturer at UCLA, where faculty member Howard Suber had done extensive research on Citizen Kane. He had also conducted personal interviews of Mankiewicz's secretary, Rita Alexander; his widow, Sara Mankiewicz; editor Robert Wise; Welles's assistant, Richard Wilson; and cast member Dorothy Comingore. Kael approached Suber in mid-1969 and offered him the chance to write a separate essay that would appear with hers in The Citizen Kane Book, and split the money. Suber extricated himself from an agreement to co-author an almost identical book with two fellow academics, and gave Kael his research. She sent him a check for $375, half of the total advance she was to be paid by Bantam Books, and he sent his essay to her. Kael dismissed Suber's repeated requests that she formalize their agreement and in time she stopped communicating with him. Suber was astonished to discover "Raising Kane" in the pages of The New Yorker in 1971; he received no credit or further payment.

"Significantly, no transcripts of Pauline's purported conversations … have survived—perhaps because she took no notes," wrote Kellow. "The only research materials in her personal archive, housed at Indiana University's Lilly Library, are copies of Howard Suber's interviews." Suber's interview with Mankiewicz's widow particularly confirmed Kael's thesis. Kael specifically did not interview Welles: "I already know what happened," she told Suber, "I don't have to talk to him."

During his 47-year tenure at UCLA, Suber chaired the Critical Studies program and the UCLA Film and Television Archive, was associate dean of the UCLA School of Theater, Film and Television, and received the Distinguished Teaching Award. He became a consultant and expert witness on copyright issues. "If I’d only known what I know about copyright now, I would have sued her...but I didn't," Suber said in a 2011 interview about Kael appropriating his research for her essay.

== Reception ==
The mainstream press accepted Kael's essay based on her credibility as one of the country's top film critics. New York Times reviewer Mordecai Richler praised Kael for "cutting Orson Welles down to size, denying his needlessly grandiose claim to having been solely responsible for everything that went into Kane, including the script and photography." (Note: Richler continues, "She insists on the importance of Gregg Toland, the photographer, and above all, sets out to demand that honor be paid at last to Herman Mankiewicz, effectively the all but sole begetter of the screenplay." In fact, in the credits for Citizen Kane, Welles credited Toland on the same card as himself—an unprecedented acknowledgment for a cinematographer—and placed his own name beneath that of Mankiewicz for the screenplay.)

"Orson was vigorously defended," wrote biographer Barton Whaley, "but in less prominently placed articles; so, again, the damage was immense and permanent."

== Response ==
"Raising Kane" angered many critics, most notably Peter Bogdanovich, a close friend of Welles, who rebutted Kael's claims in "The Kane Mutiny", an October 1972 article for Esquire. Bogdanovich later acknowledged that Welles made significant contributions to the article, while Jonathan Rosenbaum has claimed that Welles ghost-wrote the entire piece. (Note: "The by-line carried only my name," Bogdanovich later wrote, "but Orson had taken a strong hand in revising and rewriting. Why shouldn't he? He was fighting for his life.") (Note: Rosenbaum believes that Welles was the primary author of the Esquire article: "Of course, Peter knows far better than I or [Kael biographer Brian] Kellow do who wrote what, but one fact worthy of consideration in this matter is that he's never reprinted 'The Kane Mutiny' in any of his books … I also happen to think that this essay is superior, as prose and as argument, to anything else ever published under Peter's name.") (Note: "The Kane Mutiny" also appears in Focus on Orson Welles (1976), edited by Ronald Gottesman, and is excerpted in Bogdanovich's new introduction to the 1998 edition of This is Orson Welles.) "The Kane Mutiny" included the revelation that Kael had used Suber's work and did not credit him. Bogdanovich reported Suber's response to "Raising Kane", that he considered the authorship of Kane as an open question but that Kael's failure to consult Welles "violates all the principles of historical research".

Other rebuttals included articles by Sarris, Joseph McBride and Jonathan Rosenbaum, interviews with George Coulouris and Bernard Herrmann that appeared in Sight & Sound, a definitive study of the scripts by Robert L. Carringer and remarks in Welles biographies by Barbara Leaming and Frank Brady. Rosenbaum also reviewed the controversy in his editor's notes to This is Orson Welles (1992).

"The major focus of Kael's essay is its defense and celebration of screenwriter Herman J. Mankiewicz as the principal, neglected creative force behind Kane," Rosenbaum wrote. "According to Kael, the script was written almost entirely by Mankiewicz, and Welles had actively plotted to deprive him of any screen credit."

Kael reported what she was told by Mankiewicz's secretary: "Mrs. [Rita] Alexander, who took the dictation from Mankiewicz, from the first paragraph to the last, and then, when the first draft was completed and they all went back to Los Angeles, did the secretarial work at Mankiewicz’s house on the rewriting and the cuts, and who then handled the script at the studio until after the film was shot, says that Welles didn’t write (or dictate) one line of the shooting script of Citizen Kane." In "The Kane Mutiny", Bogdanovich/Welles discloses that Kael did not interview Katherine Trosper, who worked as Welles's secretary from the script's rough draft through the completion of the film. When Bogdanovich repeated Kael's assertion that Mankiewicz was the sole author of the script, Trosper replied, "Then I'd like to know, what was all that stuff I was always typing for Mr. Welles?" Kael likewise did not interview associate producer Richard Baer, who stated that he himself was "in the room and saw" Welles writing important parts of the script. (Note: "Miss Trosper and Mr. Barr are active, in good health, accessible, and both are living, as Miss Kael does, in New York City," Bogdanovich wrote. "Neither received so much as an inquiry about their part in the making of Citizen Kane. But then, neither did Welles. In fact, there is nothing to show that Miss Kael interviewed anyone of real importance associated with the actual making of the film.")

Kael wrote that the idea to use Hearst as the basis for Kane was Mankiewicz's idea, a claim supported by Houseman. She reported that a former babysitter for the Mankiewicz family said that in 1925 she had typed portions of a screenplay Mankiewicz dictated to her that involved Hearst, organized in flashbacks. Welles claimed it was his idea, which was supported by Baer in sworn testimony taken at the time Citizen Kane was released. (Note: In a sworn written statement given in May 1941, Richard Baer stated that "the idea of Citizen Kane was the original conception of Orson Welles … The revisions made by Welles were not limited to mere general suggestions but included the actual re-writing of words, dialogue, changing of sequences, ideas and characterizations and also the addition or elimination of certain scenes.")

Kael wrote that Mankiewicz "had ample proof of his authorship, and he took his evidence to the Screen Writers Guild and raised so much hell that Welles was forced to split the credit and take second place in the listing." Charles Lederer, a source for Kael's essay, insisted that the credit never came to the Writers Guild for arbitration.

Kael reported that before the film was finished, without Welles's knowledge, Mankiewicz gave the script to Lederer, who was Marion Davies's nephew. "But Lederer, apparently, was deeply upset and took the script to his aunt and Hearst. It went from them to Hearst's lawyers … It was probably as a result of Mankiewicz's idiotic indiscretion that the various forces were set in motion that resulted in the cancellation of the premiere at the Radio City Music Hall [and] the commercial failure of Citizen Kane." Lederer told Bogdanovich that Kael never bothered to check with him about the facts, that he did not give Davies the script Mankiewicz loaned him: "I gave it back to him. He asked me if I thought Marion would be offended and I said I didn't think so."

Kael reported that Mankiewicz "probably didn’t get more than eight or nine thousand dollars for the whole job; according to the cost sheets for the movie, the screenplay cost was $34,195.24, which wasn’t much, even for that day, and the figure probably includes the salary and expenses of John Houseman and the others at Victorville." Mankiewicz was paid $22,833.35 for his work.

Kael wrote that the production could not afford the fee to perform the opera called for in the script, Jules Massenet's Thaïs—a work written for Sibyl Sanderson, one of Hearst's mistresses—so composer Bernard Herrmann had to write something instead. "But Miss Kael never wrote or approached me to ask about the music," Herrmann said. "We could easily have afforded the fee. The point is that its lovely little strings would not have served the emotional purpose of the film." Herrmann disagreed with Kael's entire premise: "She tries to pretend that Welles is nothing and that a mediocre writer by the name of Mankiewicz was a hidden Voltaire. I'm not saying that Mankiewicz made no contribution … but he could not have created Citizen Kane."

Kael also related an anecdote from Nunnally Johnson, who said that during the filming of Citizen Kane Mankiewicz told him that Welles offered him, through a third party, a $10,000 bribe to relinquish screen credit. Mankiewicz, ever in need of money, was tempted by the offer. Mankiewicz reportedly said that Ben Hecht advised him to take the money and double-cross Welles. "I like to believe he did," Johnson replied when Kael asked if he believed the story. Kael left it at that: "It's not unlikely", she wrote. The unsubstantiated claim became part of the record, repeated as fact in a book by film historian Otto Friedrich and a documentary by Barry Norman.

Attorney Arnold Weissberger advised Welles not to file suit for libel. Proving malice would be difficult; Welles was a public figure, and Kael's ideas were theories and matters of opinion. A complicating factor was that Welles was receiving a portion of the royalties of The Citizen Kane Book, which contained the script as well as Kael's essay. "As it turned out, much to his sorrow, the book sold extremely well and has been reprinted many times", wrote Brady.

"'The Kane Mutiny' … did surprisingly little damage to Pauline's reputation", wrote Kellow. "It did, however, represent a serious breakdown of The New Yorker's fact-checking process."

== Reevaluation ==
Decades after the controversy over the essay, Woody Allen told Bogdanovich that he had been with Kael immediately after she finished reading "The Kane Mutiny" in Esquire. Kael was shocked at the case made against her—including the revelation that she had taken credit for the work of Suber, something Bogdanovich learned through his own connections at UCLA. Kael asked Allen, "How am I going to answer this?"

"She never responded," Bogdanovich wrote. He noted that Kael had included "Raising Kane" in a recent collection of her essays—"untouched, as though these other people's testimony didn't count or exist, as though Welles's feelings or reputation didn't matter."

By the time of Kael's death 30 years after its publication, "Raising Kane" was highly contested. Film historian Richard B. Jewell, chronicler of RKO Pictures, concluded that Welles deserved his credit as the screenplay's co-author and that Kael's arguments were "one-sided and unsupported by the facts." Largely forgotten since it was revealed in 1972, the story of Kael's appropriation of the research for "Raising Kane" became news again after it was included in a 2011 biography.

Reviewing Kellow's biography for The New York Times, critic Frank Rich remarked on Kael's "sloppy professional ethics" and the fortuitous omission of the essay from the 2011 anthology The Age of Movies: Selected Writings of Pauline Kael. "'Raising Kane' was omitted from the Library of America volume for reasons of space … but Kellow's account suggests it should have been eliminated in any event for its improprieties."

== Publication history ==
- Kael, Pauline. "Raising Kane—I". The New Yorker, February 20, 1971.
- Kael, Pauline. "Raising Kane—II". The New Yorker, February 27, 1971.
- Kael, Pauline, Mankiewicz, Herman J. and Welles, Orson. The Citizen Kane Book. Boston: Little, Brown and Company, October 28, 1971.
- Kael, Pauline. For Keeps: 30 Years at the Movies. New York: Dutton, 1994.
- Kael, Pauline, and French, Philip (intro.). Raising Kane and Other Essays. London and New York: Marion Boyars Publishers, 1996.
- Kael, Pauline. Raising Kane: Pauline Kael on the Best Film Ever Made. London: Methuen Publishing, as a supplement to Sight & Sound magazine, 2002.

== See also ==
- Auteur theory
- Film theory
- What She Said: The Art of Pauline Kael
- Mank
- Revisionism
