= Groupies (film) =

1970 documentary film by Ron Dorfman and Peter Nevard

- Directed by: Ron Dorfman and Peter Nevard
- Produced by: Robert Weiner
- Starring: Ten Years After; Alvin Lee; Joe Cocker; Terry Reid; Spooky Tooth; Luther Grosvenor; Cynthia Plaster Caster
- Cinematography: Michael Becker; Ron Dorfman; Bill Markle; Peter Nevard
- Edited by: Ron Dorfman
- Music by: Alan Corbeth; Mitchell Plotkin
- Distributed by: Maron Films Limited
- Release date: November 8, 1970
- Running time: 92 minutes
- Country: United States
- Language: English

Groupies is a 1970 American documentary film, directed by Ron Dorfman and Peter Nevard. Filmed over nine months, the film follows the exploits of young men and women who follow rock bands and try to get close to the musicians. It features interviews, fly-on-the wall observations, and onstage and offstage footage of a little-known subculture.

== Featuring ==
- Alvin Lee and Ten Years After
- Joe Cocker
- Terry Reid
- Spooky Tooth
- Luther Grosvenor
- Cynthia Plaster Caster
- Pamela Des Barres
