= 5001 Nights at the Movies =

1982 book by Pauline Kael

- Book cover, first edition
- Author: Pauline Kael
- Language: English
- Publisher: Holt, Rinehart & Winston
- Publication date: 1982
- ISBN: 978-0030426063

5001 Nights at the Movies: A Guide from A to Z, first published in 1982, is a book compiling passages of film critic Pauline Kael's reviews from the silent era to the early 1980s. They were originally written for The New Yorker's 'Goings On About Town' section.

== Summary ==
In her regular New Yorker column Kael wrote long, detailed critiques of the latest films. 5001 Nights is made up of abbreviated reviews of those longer articles, and single-paragraph critiques of dozens of other movies from throughout the 20th century. Her reviews often contain a phrase that captures a film's essence.

== Excerpts ==
- In a Lonely Place: "an atmospheric but disappointingly hollow murder melodrama"
- Rebel Without a Cause: "had more emotional resonance for the teenagers of the time than many much better movies"
- Written on the Wind: "his [Douglas Sirk's] talent for whipping up sour, stylized soap operas in posh settings"
- The Tarnished Angels: "the kind of bad movie that you know is bad—and yet you're held by the mixture of polished style and quasi-melodramatics achieved by the director, Douglas Sirk"
- Gun Crazy: "In its B-movie way, it has a fascinating crumminess"
- New York, New York: "an honest failure...the improvisational Cassavetes-like psychodrama seems hollow and makes it uneasy"
- Raging Bull: "He [Martin Scorsese] loses the lowlife entertainment value of prizefight films; he aestheticizes pulp and kills it"
- Au hasard Balthazar: "Considered a masterpiece by some, but others may find it painstakingly tedious and offensively holy"
- Red Desert: "Boredom in Ravenna, and it seeps into the viewer's bones"
- The Wrong Man: "an unusually drab Hitchcock film"

== Expanded edition ==
Henry Holt and Company published an expanded edition in 1991 with 800 additional Kael reviews of films released after the book's original 1982 date.
