= When the Lights Go Down (book) =

1980 book by Pauline Kael

- First edition cover
- Author: Pauline Kael
- Genre: Film Review
- Publisher: Henry Holt & Co.
- Publication date: 1980
- ISBN: 0030568420

When the Lights Go Down: Film Writings 1975–1980 (1980), is the sixth collection of movie reviews by the critic Pauline Kael.

== Background ==
All material in the book originally appeared in The New Yorker. The collection begins with an appreciation of Cary Grant. "Mae West's raucous invitation to him - 'Why don't you come up sometime and see me?' - was echoed thirty years later by Audrey Hepburn in Charade: 'Won't you come in for a minute? I don't bite, you know, unless it's called for.' And then, purringly, 'Do you know what's wrong with you? Nothing.' That might be a summary of Cary Grant, the finest romantic comedian of his era: there's nothing the matter with him." After the profile of Cary Grant the book contains reviews of movies of the second half of the 1970s - more than one hundred and fifty of them.

The book is out of print in the United States, but is still published by Marion Boyars Publishers in the United Kingdom.

== Critical response ==
National Post reported that the volume "sold in impressive numbers". Matthew Wilder of City Pages wrote of Kael and offered "Her peak can be seen in the masterly collection When the Lights Go Down". Jim Emersonon of Sun Times wrote of Renata Adler's 7,646-word attack on Kael, "The Perils of Pauline," in the New York Review of Books, that it "...was ostensibly a review of Kael's 1980 collection When the Lights Go Down." Adler panned Kael's work on the volume, writing, "When the Lights Go Down, a collection of her reviews over the past five years, is out; and it is, to my surprise and without Kael- or Simon-like exaggeration, not simply, jarringly, piece by piece, line by line, and without interruption, worthless. It turns out to embody something appalling and widespread in the culture."

The volume has been archived in the National Library of Australia.

== Editions ==
- Henry Holt & Co., 1980, hardbound (ISBN 0030425115)
- Henry Holt & Co., 1980, paperback (ISBN 0030568420)
