= Howard Suber =

American author and educator about film and television

- Born: July 21, 1937 (age 89); Owosso, Michigan
- Occupations: Professor, author, expert witness
- Spouse(s): (1958—present); Roberta (Soffin) Suber
- Children: 2

Howard Suber, Ph.D. (born July 21, 1937) is an American author, educator, and film scholar, known for his contributions to the study and teaching of film history, theory, and production. He was a longtime faculty member at the University of California, Los Angeles (UCLA) School of Theater, Film and Television (TFT), where he helped develop film education programs and mentor generations of filmmakers. Geoffrey Gilmore, director of the Tribeca Film Festival and former director of the Sundance Film Festival, praised Suber's influence on film education, stating that he was "one of the foremost teachers of film in the world".

== Academic career ==
Suber was a faculty member at UCLA from 1965 to 1994, during which he taught more than 65 courses related to film and television. He helped shape the academic structure of UCLA's film studies programs and had multiple leadership roles. As the founding chair of the Film and Television Producers Program (1987–1994), he established and led a program designed to educate students about the realities of working in the film and television industries, with courses taught by active industry professionals including Peter Guber, Arnold Rifkin, and David Puttnam. From 1970 to 1975, he was a founding director of the UCLA Film and Television Archive, expanding its collection from 30 to more than 3,000 prints, making it one of the largest film collections outside the Library of Congress. Additionally, as the founding chair of the Film History, Theory, and Criticism Program (1970–1978), he designed and led the Ph.D. program in film and television studies. He was also associate dean of the UCLA TFT (1989–1990), a key administrator in the newly formed school.

== Other work ==
In addition to his academic contributions, Suber has worked as a consultant and expert witness for more than 35 years on issues related to copyright, creative control, film production, writing, and fair use.

== Publications ==
Suber has written several books on the principles of filmmaking, creativity, and copyright issues in the film industry. His works include The Power of Film, which analyzes the structures, psychology, and philosophies underlying popular films. Francis Ford Coppola called this book "wise...liberating. Howard Suber's understanding of film storytelling is surprisingly contrary to what everyone knows. A remarkable work." The book was adapted into a 6-part TV series on TCM. Suber's other books are Letters to Young Filmmakers: Creativity and Getting Your Films Made, offering insights and advice on overcoming industry challenges; and Creativity and Copyright: Legal Essentials for Screenwriters and Creative Artists, with John Geiger, which explores the intersection of creativity and copyright law.

== Television ==
Suber was creator, writer, and narrator of the 2024 six-part television series, The Power of Film, exploring the art of storytelling through the defining principles and inner workings of the most popular and memorable American films. The series was executive produced by two of Suber's former students and teaching assistants, filmmakers Doug Pray and Laura Gabbert. Director Alexander Payne praised the series. "By connecting us to what makes our stories powerful," he said, "Howard Suber connects us to who we are as human beings. An extraordinary and essential series.”

== Honors and recognition ==
Suber has received multiple awards recognizing his impact on film education and scholarship. In 1987, he was honored with the Distinguished Teaching Award by the UCLA Academic Senate. In 2003, he received a Lifetime Achievement Award from the Temecula Valley International Film Festival. He was also presented with a Life Achievement Award in 2007 by the Kansas City Film Jubilee for his contributions to independent film. In 2014, he was awarded the Dickson Emeritus Professorship Award, the highest honor for retired faculty at UCLA. A year later, in 2015, a "Celebration of 50 Years of Teaching at UCLA" was held in his honor, during which a scholarship in his name was established through student donations.
