= Pauline Kael =

American film critic (1919–2001)

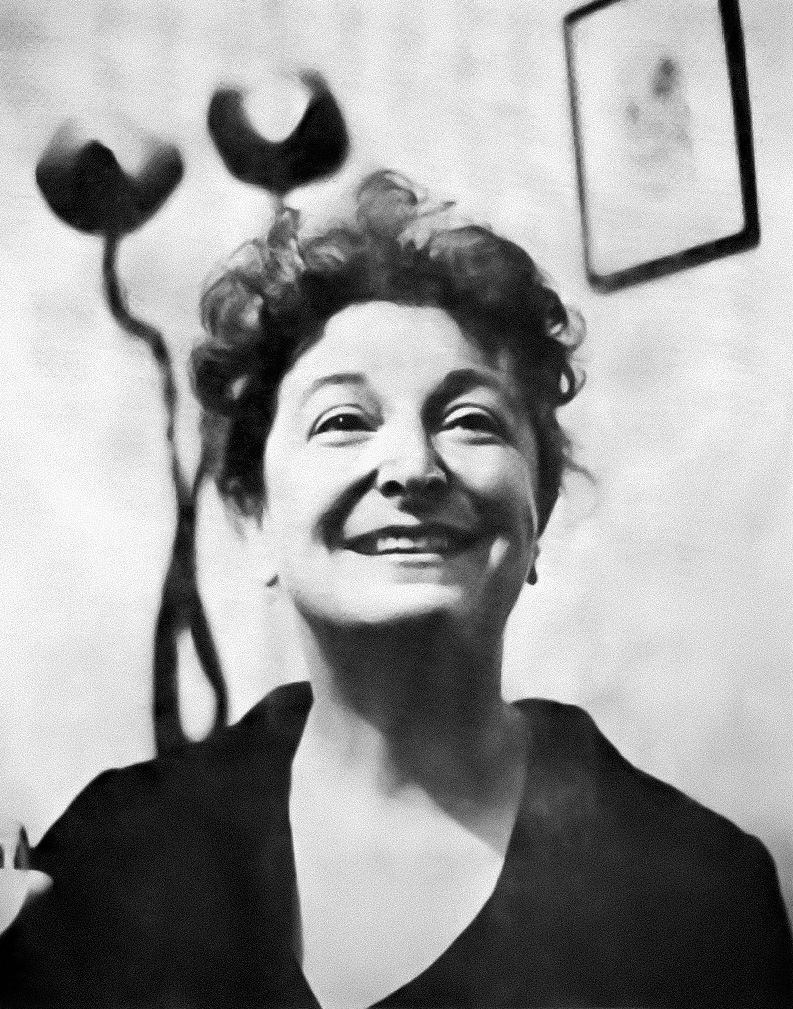
- Author portrait of Kael from the dust jacket of Kiss Kiss Bang Bang (1968)
- Born: June 19, 1919; Petaluma, California, U.S.
- Died: September 3, 2001 (aged 82); Great Barrington, Massachusetts, U.S.
- Occupation: Film critic
- Spouse: Edward Landberg (m. 1955; div. 1959)
- Children: 1
- Writing career
- Period: 1951–1991

Pauline Kael (/keɪl/ KAYL; June 19, 1919 – September 3, 2001) was an American film critic who wrote for The New Yorker from 1968 to 1991. Known for her "witty, biting, highly opinionated and sharply focused" reviews, Kael often defied the consensus of her contemporaries.

One of the most influential American film critics of her era, she left a lasting impression on the art form. Roger Ebert wrote in an obituary that Kael "had a more positive influence on the climate for film in America than any other single person over the last three decades". Kael, he said, "had no theory, no rules, no guidelines, no objective standards. You couldn't apply her 'approach' to a film. With her it was all personal." In a blurb for The Age of Movies, a collection of Kael's writings for the Library of America, Ebert wrote, "Like George Bernard Shaw, she wrote reviews that will be read for their style, humor and energy long after some of their subjects have been forgotten."

For American readers, she brought attention to international cinema, and championed New Hollywood directors. Sanford Schwartz writes that, in the 1960s, she "gave a breathing, textured life to the aims and sensibilities of Ingmar Bergman, Jean-Luc Godard, Federico Fellini, Satyajit Ray, Akira Kurosawa, François Truffaut, and Michelangelo Antonioni, among other European and Asian directors; and she endowed Robert Altman, Martin Scorsese, Paul Mazursky, Brian De Palma, and Francis Ford Coppola, among American directors of the following decade, with the same full-bodied presence. [...] Her deepest subject, in the end, isn't movies at all—it's how to live more intensely."

== Early life and education ==
Kael was the fifth and last child of Isaac Paul Kael and Judith Kael (née Friedman), Jewish immigrants from Poland, who moved from New York to run a chicken farm among other Jewish chicken farmers, in Petaluma, California. Her siblings were Louis (1906), Philip (1909), Annie (1912), and Rose (1913). Her parents lost their farm when Kael was eight, and the family moved to San Francisco, where Kael attended Girls High School.

Kael wrote of film critics of her generation: "We were in almost at the beginning, when something new was added to the human experience." Her parents took her to see silent films, which she later referred to, writing that D. W. Griffith's Intolerance (1916) was "the greatest movie ever made" and that Renée Falconetti's performance in Carl Theodor Dreyer's The Passion of Joan of Arc (1928) was "the finest ever recorded on film". In 1936, Kael matriculated at the University of California, Berkeley, where she studied philosophy, literature, and art. Her confidence in writing was evident from early on and can be seen in unpublished writings to her university friends, poet Robert Duncan and writer Violet Ginsberg. In college, as a teaching assistant, she graded papers for up to three professors, and met with students after hours offering frank advice. Kael dropped out in 1940. She had intended to go to law school, but fell in with a group of artists and moved to New York City with the poet Robert Horan.

Three years later, Kael returned to Berkeley and "led a bohemian life", writing plays and working in experimental film. In 1948, she and the filmmaker James Broughton had a daughter, Gina James, whom Kael raised alone. Gina had a congenital heart defect for much of her childhood that Kael could not afford the surgery to correct.

== Early career ==
From age 17, when she started college, until 30 years later, when she was publishing work in national publications, Kael held a steady stream of odd jobs to support herself and later her daughter. She wrote advertising copy and edited manuscripts, preferring to take less time-intensive work so that it would not interfere with her own writing. She took jobs such as nanny, cook, seamstress, and violin teacher in addition to her copy writing and editing work.

In 1952, Peter D. Martin, the editor of City Lights, overheard Kael arguing about films in a coffee shop with a friend and asked her to review Charlie Chaplin's Limelight (1952). Kael dubbed the film "Slimelight" and began publishing film criticism regularly in magazines.

Kael later said of her writing: "I worked to loosen my style—to get away from the term-paper pomposity that we learn at college. I wanted the sentences to breathe, to have the sound of a human voice." She disparaged the supposed critic's ideal of objectivity, calling it "saphead objectivity", and incorporated aspects of autobiography into her criticism. In a review of Vittorio De Sica's Shoeshine (1946) that has been ranked among her most memorable, Kael described seeing the film

after one of those terrible lovers' quarrels that leave one in a state of incomprehensible despair. I came out of the theater, tears streaming, and overheard the petulant voice of a college girl complaining to her boyfriend, "Well I don't see what was so special about that movie." I walked up the street, crying blindly, no longer certain whether my tears were for the tragedy on the screen, the hopelessness I felt for myself, or the alienation I felt from those who could not experience the radiance of Shoeshine. For if people cannot feel Shoeshine, what can they feel? ... Later I learned that the man with whom I had quarreled had gone the same night and had also emerged in tears. Yet our tears for each other, and for Shoeshine, did not bring us together. Life, as Shoeshine demonstrates, is too complex for facile endings.

Kael broadcast many of her early reviews on Berkeley's alternative public radio station KPFA. From the later part of the 1950s, she was able to make a living as a critic, combining her writing and opinions with running the Berkeley Cinema-Guild and Studio, which she became involved with in 1955 after marrying its owner, Edward Landberg. He paid for Gina's heart surgery, and made Kael the cinema's manager in 1955. She programmed the films at the two-screen facility, "unapologetically repeat[ing] her favorites until they also became audience favorites". Kael took on every aspect of running the guild and studio, turning it into a thriving business. She also wrote "pungent" capsule reviews of the films that her patrons began collecting. Kael remained in that position until 1960, when she and Landberg divorced.

== Going mass-market ==
Kael continued to juggle writing with other work until she received an offer to publish a book of her criticism. Published in 1965 as I Lost It at the Movies, the collection was a surprise bestseller, selling 150,000 paperback copies, and remains the collection for which she is best known. Upon the success of her book, she and Gina moved to New York and Kael began writing reviews for mass-market publications, including the women's magazine McCall's. By 1966, as Newsweek put it in a profile of her, Kael "went mass".

Even with critical success, Kael's writing style was atypical of early mass-market publications, leading to conflict with editors. In 1966, Kael wrote a blistering review of The Sound of Music in McCall's. After mentioning that some of the press had dubbed it "The Sound of Money", she called the film's message a "sugarcoated lie that people seem to want to eat". According to legend, this review got her fired from McCall's (The New York Times said as much in Kael's obituary), but Kael and the magazine's editor, Robert Stein, denied this. According to Stein, he appreciated her contrarian view on The Sound of Music but fired her "months later, after she kept panning every commercial movie from Lawrence of Arabia and Dr. Zhivago to The Pawnbroker and A Hard Day's Night."

Kael's dismissal from McCall's led to a stint from 1966 to 1967 at The New Republic, whose editors continually altered her writing without her permission. In October 1967, Kael wrote a long essay on Bonnie and Clyde that the magazine declined to publish. William Shawn of The New Yorker obtained the piece and ran it in The New Yorker issue of October 21. Kael's rave review was at odds with prevailing opinion, which was that the film was inconsistent in its blending of comedy and violence. According to critic David Thomson, "she was right about a film that had bewildered many other critics." A few months after the essay ran, Kael quit The New Republic "in despair". In 1968, Shawn asked her to join The New Yorker staff; she alternated as film critic every six months with Penelope Gilliatt until 1979, and became the sole critic in 1980 after a year's leave of absence working in the film industry.

== The New Yorker tenure ==
After she had been fired by two publications, The New Yorker published two of Kael's essays, giving her a secure platform and national audience.

Initially, many considered Kael's colloquial, brash writing style an odd fit with the sophisticated and genteel New Yorker. Kael remembered "getting a letter from an eminent The New Yorker writer suggesting that I was trampling through the pages of the magazine with cowboy boots covered with dung". During her tenure at The New Yorker, she took advantage of a forum that permitted her to write at length—and with minimal editorial interference—thereby achieving her greatest prominence. By 1968, Time magazine called her "one of the country's top movie critics".

In 1970, Kael received a George Polk Award for her work as a critic at The New Yorker. She continued to publish collections of her writing with suggestive titles such as Kiss Kiss Bang Bang, When the Lights Go Down, and Taking It All In. Her fourth collection, Deeper into Movies (1973), won the U.S. National Book Award in the Arts and Letters category. It was the first nonfiction book about film to win a National Book Award.

During her tenure at The New Yorker, Kael delved more seriously into aspects of American film making. She also wrote philosophical essays on movie-going, the modern Hollywood film industry, and what she saw as audiences' lack of courage to explore lesser-known, more challenging movies (she rarely used the word "film" because she felt it was too elitist). Among her more popular essays were a damning 1973 review of Norman Mailer's semi-fictional Marilyn: a Biography (an account of Marilyn Monroe's life); an incisive 1975 look at Cary Grant's career; and "Raising Kane" (1971), a book-length essay on the authorship of the film Citizen Kane that was the longest piece of sustained writing she had yet done.

Commissioned as an introduction to the shooting script in The Citizen Kane Book, "Raising Kane" was first printed in two consecutive issues of The New Yorker. The essay extended Kael's dispute of the auteur theory, arguing that Herman J. Mankiewicz, the screenplay's coauthor, was virtually its sole author and the film's actual guiding force. Kael further alleged that Orson Welles had schemed to deprive Mankiewicz of screen credit. Welles considered suing Kael for libel. He was defended by critics, scholars and friends, including Peter Bogdanovich, who rebutted Kael's claims in a 1972 article that included the revelation that Kael had appropriated the extensive research of a UCLA faculty member without crediting him.

Woody Allen said of Kael: "She has everything that a great critic needs except judgment. And I don't mean that facetiously. She has great passion, terrific wit, wonderful writing style, huge knowledge of film history, but too often what she chooses to extol or fails to see is very surprising."

Kael battled the editors of the New Yorker as much as her own critics. She fought with Shawn to review the 1972 pornographic film Deep Throat, eventually relenting. According to Kael, after reading her unfavorable review of Terrence Malick's 1973 film Badlands, Shawn said, "I guess you didn't know that Terry is like a son to me." Kael responded, "Tough shit, Bill", and her review was printed unchanged. Other than sporadic confrontations with Shawn, Kael said she did most of her work at home, writing.

Upon the release of Kael's 1980 collection When the Lights Go Down, her New Yorker colleague Renata Adler published an 8,000-word review in The New York Review of Books that dismissed the book as "jarringly, piece by piece, line by line, and without interruption, worthless." Adler argued that Kael's post-1960s work contained "nothing certainly of intelligence or sensibility" and faulted her "quirks [and] mannerisms", including repeated use of "bullying" imperatives and rhetorical questions. The piece quickly became infamous in literary circles, described by Time magazine as "the New York literary Mafia['s] bloodiest case of assault and battery in years." Kael did not respond to it, but Adler's review became known as "the most sensational attempt on Kael's reputation".

In 1979, Kael accepted an offer from Warren Beatty to be a consultant to Paramount Pictures, but left the position after only a few months to return to writing criticism.

== Later years ==
In 1971, Kael purchased a house in Great Barrington, Massachusetts, and divided her time between it and New York. While in New York she would see movies and turn in her articles, but she is said to have written them in Massachusetts.

In the early 1980s, Kael was diagnosed with Parkinson's disease, which sometimes has a cognitive component, and commuting between Massachusetts and New York became arduous. As her condition worsened, she became increasingly depressed about the state of American films, along with feeling that "I had nothing new to say". In a March 11, 1991, announcement that The New York Times called "earth-shattering", Kael announced her retirement from reviewing films regularly. She said she would still write essays for The New Yorker and "reflections and other pieces of writing about movies", but over the next 10 years, she published no new work except an introduction to her 1994 compendium For Keeps. In the introduction (which was reprinted in The New Yorker), Kael wrote: "I'm frequently asked why I don't write my memoirs. I think I have".

Though she published nothing new, Kael was not averse to giving interviews, occasionally giving her opinion on new films and television shows. In a 1998 interview with Modern Maturity, she said she sometimes regretted not being able to review: "A few years ago, when I saw Vanya on 42nd Street, I wanted to blow trumpets. Your trumpets are gone once you've quit." She died at her home in Great Barrington on September 3, 2001, aged 82.

== Style ==
Kael was known for mingling high and low culture; per The New York Times, "Kael could mingle references to literary lions like Saul Bellow, Jean Genet and Norman Mailer with demotic condemnations like loony, sleazo, junk and bummer." She often made allusions to other arts; reviewing Jules and Jim, she wrote, "The film was adapted from Henri-Pierre Roché's autobiographical novel, written when he was seventy-four .. If some of us have heard of Roché, it is probably just the scrap of information that he was the man who introduced Gertrude Stein to Picasso—but this scrap shouldn't be discarded, because both Stein and Picasso are relevant to the characters and period of Jules and Jim. Roché is now dead, but the model for Catherine, the Jeanne Moreau role, is a German literary woman who is still alive; it was she who translated Lolita into German." She called the title characters "Mutt and Jeff, Sancho Panza and Don Quixote, devoted friends, contentedly arguing about life and letters."

Richard Corliss contrasts Kael with Andrew Sarris: "Sarris' prose was dense, balanced, aphoristic, alliterative; he had taken more from the French than just the politique des auteurs. Kael's was loping, derisive, intimate, gag-packed, as American as Lenny Bruce. I can recall reading one of Kael's early pieces in Film Quarterly (1961, maybe) and being shocked—shocked!—to see she'd used a contraction. In those prim days, when most serious film criticism read like term papers in sociology and most popular reviews read like wire copy, Kael's writing was the battle cry of a vital and dangerous new era, the equivalent of Little Richard's primal 'A wop bop a loo bop, a wop bam boom!' that announced the birth of rock 'n' roll."

== Opinions ==
Kael's opinions often ran contrary to her fellow critics'. Her opinions' originality and the forceful way she expressed them won her ardent supporters and angry detractors. Occasionally, she championed films considered critical failures, such as The Warriors and Last Tango in Paris. She was not especially cruel to some films that many critics deplored—such as the 1972 Man of La Mancha (she praised Sophia Loren's performance). She panned some films that had widespread critical admiration, such as Limelight, Network, A Woman Under the Influence ("murky, ragmop"), and The Loneliness of the Long Distance Runner. Kael disliked most experimental cinema (calling it "a creature of publicity and mutual congratulations on artistry"), and most student films ("freshmen compositions"). She wrote unfavorably of It's a Wonderful Life, Shoah ("logy and exhausting"), Dances with Wolves ("a nature boy movie"), and 2001: A Space Odyssey ("monumentally unimaginative").

Kael's reviews included a pan of West Side Story (1961) that drew harsh replies from its fans; ecstatic reviews of Z and MASH, which enormously boosted their popularity; and enthusiastic appraisals of Brian De Palma's early films. Her "preview" of Robert Altman's film Nashville appeared in print several months before the film was completed, in an attempt to prevent the studio from recutting the film and to catapult it to box-office success. She expressed misgivings about Salesman and Gimme Shelter (both directed by Albert Maysles, David Maysles, and Charlotte Zwerin), falsely alleging Paul Brennan was in the roofing and siding business before playing a bible salesman for Salesman. The directors threatened to sue for libel and rebutted Kael's claims in an open letter to the magazine, although due to its policies at the time, the letter was not printed until 1996.

Kael was an opponent of the auteur theory, criticizing it both in her reviews and in interviews. She preferred to analyze films without thinking about the director's other works. Andrew Sarris, a key proponent of the theory, debated it with Kael in the pages of The New Yorker and various film magazines. Kael believed a film should be considered a collaborative effort, without excessive focus on the director. In "Raising Kane", she argues Citizen Kane relies not only on Orson Welles as star, director and co-writer, but also on the talents of co-writer Herman J. Mankiewicz and cinematographer Gregg Toland.

=== Views on violence ===
Kael had a taste for antihero films that violate taboos involving sex and violence; this reportedly alienated some of her readers. But she panned Midnight Cowboy (1969), the X-rated antihero film that won an Oscar for Best Picture. She also strongly disliked films she found manipulative or superficially appealing to conventional attitudes and feelings. She was particularly critical of Clint Eastwood: her reviews of his films and acting were resoundingly unfavorable, and she became known as his nemesis.

Kael was an enthusiastic, if occasionally ambivalent, supporter of Sam Peckinpah and Walter Hill's early work, both of whom specialized in violent action dramas. Her collection 5001 Nights at the Movies includes favorable reviews of nearly all of Peckinpah's films except The Getaway (1972), as well as Hill's Hard Times (1975), The Warriors (1979), and Southern Comfort (1981). Despite her initial dismissal of John Boorman's Point Blank (1967) for what she felt was its pointless brutality, she later called it "intermittently dazzling" with "more energy and invention than Boorman seems to know what to do with ... one comes out exhilarated but bewildered".

But Kael reacted badly to some action films she felt pushed what she called "right-wing" or "fascist" agendas. She called Don Siegel's Dirty Harry (1971), starring Eastwood, a "right-wing fantasy", "a remarkably single-minded attack on liberal values", and "fascist medievalism". In an otherwise extremely favorable review of Peckinpah's Straw Dogs, Kael concluded that Peckinpah had made "the first American film that is a fascist work of art".

In her review of Stanley Kubrick's A Clockwork Orange (1971), Kael wrote that she felt some directors who used brutal imagery were desensitizing audiences to violence:

At the movies, we are gradually being conditioned to accept violence as a sensual pleasure. The directors used to say they were showing us its real face and how ugly it was in order to sensitize us to its horrors. You don't have to be very keen to see that they are now in fact de-sensitizing us. They are saying that everyone is brutal, and the heroes must be as brutal as the villains or they turn into fools. There seems to be an assumption that if you're offended by movie brutality, you are somehow playing into the hands of the people who want censorship. But this would deny those of us who don't believe in censorship the use of the only counterbalance: the freedom of the press to say that there's anything conceivably damaging in these films—the freedom to analyze their implications. If we don't use this critical freedom, we are implicitly saying that no brutality is too much for us—that only squares and people who believe in censorship are concerned with brutality.

=== Accusations of homophobia ===
In his preface to a 1983 interview with Kael for the gay magazine Mandate, Sam Staggs wrote: "she has always carried on a love/hate affair with her gay legions. ... like the bitchiest queen in gay mythology, she has a sharp remark about everything". But in the early 1980s, largely in response to her review of the 1981 drama Rich and Famous, Kael faced notable accusations of homophobia. First remarked upon by Stuart Byron in The Village Voice, according to gay writer Craig Seligman, the accusations eventually "took on a life of their own and did real damage to her reputation".

In her review, Kael called the straight-themed Rich and Famous "more like a homosexual fantasy", saying that one female character's "affairs, with their masochistic overtones, are creepy, because they don't seem like what a woman would get into". Byron, who "hit the ceiling" after reading the review, was joined by The Celluloid Closet author Vito Russo, who argued Kael equated promiscuity with homosexuality, "as though straight women have never been promiscuous or been given the permission to be promiscuous".

In response to her review of Rich and Famous, several critics reappraised Kael's earlier reviews of gay-themed films, including a wisecrack Kael made about the gay-themed The Children's Hour: "I always thought this was why lesbians needed sympathy—that there isn't much they can do." Seligman has defended Kael, saying that these remarks showed "enough ease with the topic to be able to crack jokes—in a dark period when other reviewers ... 'felt that if homosexuality were not a crime it would spread.'" Kael rejected the accusations as "craziness", adding, "I don't see how anybody who took the trouble to check out what I've actually written about movies with homosexual elements in them could believe that stuff."

=== Nixon quote ===
In December 1972, a month after U.S. President Richard Nixon was reelected in a landslide, Kael gave a lecture at the Modern Language Association during which she said: "I live in a rather special world. I only know one person who voted for Nixon. Where they [Nixon's other supporters] are I don't know. They're outside my ken. But sometimes when I'm in a theater I can feel them." A New York Times article about the lecture quoted this statement.

Kael was subsequently misquoted as having said, "I can't believe Nixon won. I don't know anyone who voted for him" or something that similarly expressed surprise at the election result. This misquotation became an urban legend, and has been cited by conservatives (such as Bernard Goldberg, in his 2001 book Bias) as an example of insularity among the liberal elite. The misquotation has also been attributed to other writers, such as Joan Didion.

== Influence ==
Owen Gleiberman said Kael "was more than a great critic. She reinvented the form, and pioneered an entire aesthetic of writing." She turned film critique into social commentary on the art of filmmaking as a lens of "American consciousness." As The New Yorker's critic, Kael greatly influenced her fellow critics. In the early 1970s, Cinerama distributors "initiate[d] a policy of individual screenings for each critic because her remarks [during the film] were affecting her fellow critics".

In the 1970s and '80s, Kael cultivated friendships with a group of young, mostly male critics, some of whom emulated her distinctive writing style. Referred to derisively as the "Paulettes", they dominated national film criticism in the 1990s. Critics who have acknowledged Kael's influence include, among many others, A. O. Scott of The New York Times, David Denby and Anthony Lane of The New Yorker, David Edelstein of New York Magazine, Greil Marcus, Elvis Mitchell, Michael Sragow, Armond White, and Stephanie Zacharek of Salon.

It was repeatedly alleged that, after her retirement, Kael's "most ardent devotees deliberate[d] with each other [to] forge a common School of Pauline position" before writing their reviews. When confronted by the rumor that she ran "a conspiratorial network of young critics", Kael said she believed that critics imitated her style rather than her opinions, saying, "A number of critics take phrases and attitudes from me, and those takings stick out—they're not integral to the writer's temperament or approach".

Asked in 1998 whether she thought her criticism had affected the way films were made, Kael replied, "If I say yes, I'm an egotist, and if I say no, I've wasted my life". Several directors' careers were profoundly affected by her, most notably that of Taxi Driver screenwriter Paul Schrader, who was accepted at UCLA Film School's graduate program on Kael's recommendation. Under her mentorship, Schrader worked as a critic before taking up screenwriting and directing full time.

Derek Malcolm, who worked for several decades as a film critic for The Guardian, said: "If a director was praised by Kael, he or she was generally allowed to work, since the money-men knew there would be similar approbation across a wide field of publications". Alternately, Kael was said to have had the power to prevent filmmakers from working. David Lean said that her criticism of his work "kept him from making a movie for 14 years", referring to the 14-year break between Ryan's Daughter in 1970 and A Passage to India in 1984.

In 1978, Kael received the Women in Film Crystal Award for outstanding women who, through their endurance and the excellence of their work, have helped to expand the role of women in the entertainment industry. In his 1988 film Willow, George Lucas named one of the villains "General Kael" after her. Kael had often reviewed Lucas's work unenthusiastically; her review of Willow called the character an "hommage à moi".

Though he began directing films after she retired, Quentin Tarantino was also influenced by Kael. He read her criticism voraciously while growing up and said Kael was "as influential as any director was in helping me develop my aesthetic". Wes Anderson recounted his efforts to screen his film Rushmore for Kael in a 1999 The New York Times article titled "My Private Screening With Pauline Kael". He later wrote to Kael, saying: "[Y]our thoughts and writing about the movies [have] been a very important source of inspiration for me and my movies, and I hope you don't regret that".

In 1997, cultural critic Camille Paglia said Kael was her second-favorite critic (after Parker Tyler), criticizing Kael's commentary on such films as La Dolce Vita and Last Year at Marienbad but also calling her "unfailingly perceptive [...] [her] tart, lively, colloquial style I thought exactly right for a mass form like the movies."

In January 2000, filmmaker Michael Moore posted a recollection of Kael's response to his 1989 documentary film Roger & Me. Moore wrote that Kael was incensed that she had to watch Roger & Me in a cinema after Moore refused to send her a tape for her to watch at home, and she resented Roger & Me winning Best Documentary at the 55th New York Film Critics Circle Awards. Moore said:

two weeks later, she wrote a nasty, mean review of my film in The New Yorker. It was OK with me that she didn't like the film, and it didn't bother me that she didn't like the point I was making, or even how I was making it. What was so incredibly appalling and shocking is how she printed outright lies about my movie. I had never experienced such a brazen, bald-faced barrage of disinformation. She tried to rewrite history.... Her complete fabrication of the facts was so weird, so out there, so obviously made-up, that my first response was this must be a humor piece she had written.... But, of course, she wasn't writing comedy. She was a deadly serious historical revisionist.

Kael's career is discussed at length in the 2009 documentary For the Love of Movies by critics whose careers she helped shape, such as Owen Gleiberman and Elvis Mitchell, as well as by those who fought with her, such as Andrew Sarris. The film also shows several of Kael's appearances on PBS, including one alongside Woody Allen. In 2011, Brian Kellow published a biography of Kael, A Life in the Dark.

In a 2024 interview, director Ridley Scott said that Kael's harsh critique of his 1982 film Blade Runner made him question the value of such reviews, and that he never read reviews of his films after that.

The Pauline Kael Breakout Award for outstanding contribution to cinema is awarded annually by the Florida Film Critics Circle.

Rob Garver's documentary What She Said: The Art of Pauline Kael was released in 2018. With Sarah Jessica Parker narrating for Kael, the film is a portrait of Kael's work and her influence on the male-dominated worlds of cinema and film criticism.

David Thomson wrote of Kael: "How good was she? Very, very good, because she was a terrific journalist who took immense pains to seem spontaneous, who believed that it ought to be possible to write about entertainments in ways that made them more stimulating for thousands of people ... she established for a while something that had not been true since the impact of television—that the movies were ours, that they spoke to and for a society and were the most telling, deeply felt impression of who we were and might be ... as time passes, I suspect she will seem more remarkable, more useful as a measure of her time, and more sexy. I suspect she would have given it all up if she could have had one scene in one film—like Dorothy Malone with Bogart in The Big Sleep.

== Awards ==
- 1964: John Simon Guggenheim Memorial Foundation Fellowship
- 1970: George Polk Award, Criticism
- 1974: National Book Award, Arts and Letters, for Deeper into Movies
- 1978: Crystal Award, Women in Film Crystal Awards
- 1980: Muse Award, New York Women in Film & Television
- 1991: Mel Novikoff Award, San Francisco International Film Festival
- 1994: Special Award, Los Angeles Film Critics Association Awards
- 1995: Writer Award, Gotham Independent Film Awards
- 2012: Posthumous induction into the Online Film & Television Association Film Hall of Fame, Behind the Scenes, Film Criticism

== Bibliography ==
=== Books ===
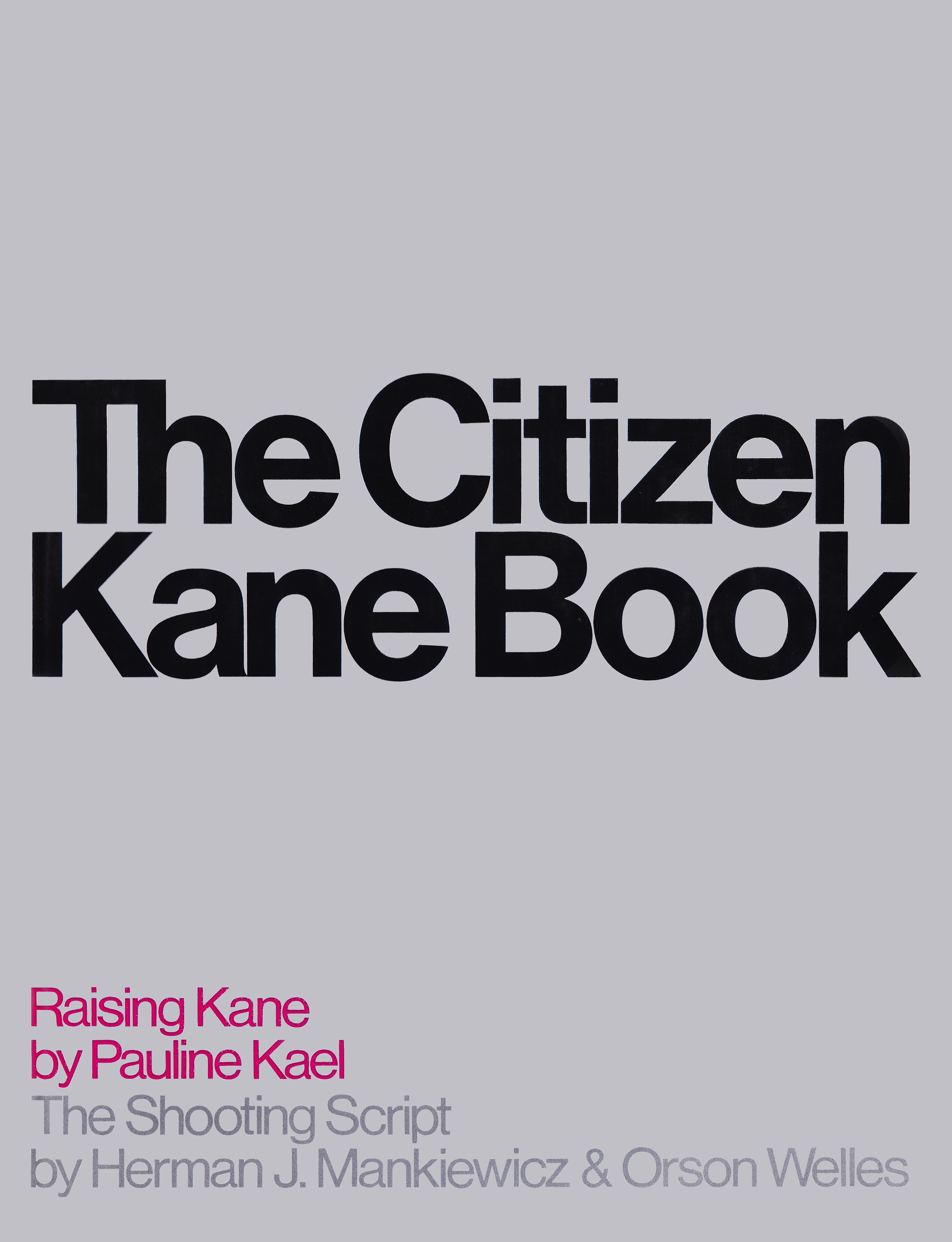
The Citizen Kane Book (1971)

- I Lost It at the Movies (1965)
- Kiss Kiss Bang Bang (1968) ISBN 0-316-48163-7
- Going Steady (1969) ISBN 0-553-05880-0
- The Citizen Kane Book (1971) OCLC 209252
- Deeper into Movies (1973) ISBN 0-7145-0941-8
- Reeling (1976)
- When the Lights Go Down (1980) ISBN 0-03-042511-5
- 5001 Nights at the Movies (1982, revised in 1984 and 1991) ISBN 0-8050-1367-9
- Taking It All In (1984) ISBN 0-03-069362-4
- State of the Art (1985) ISBN 0-7145-2869-2
- Hooked (1989)
- Movie Love (1991)
- For Keeps (1994)
- Raising Kane, and other essays (1996)

=== Reviews and essays ===
- "Trash, Art, and the Movies", essay published in the Feb. 1969 issue of Harper's
- "Raising Kane", book-length essay on the making of Citizen Kane published in the February 20, 1971 and February 27, 1971 issues of The New Yorker
- "Stanley Strangelove", review of A Clockwork Orange from a January 1972 issue of The New Yorker
- "The Man From Dream City", profile of Cary Grant from the July 14, 1975 issue of The New Yorker
- Kael, Pauline (June 23, 1980). "Why Are Movies So Bad? Or, The Numbers". The New Yorker. p. 82.
- Kael, Pauline (January 7, 1985). "The Current Cinema: Fever Dream / Echo Chamber". The New Yorker. Vol. 60, no. 47. pp. 66–70. Reviews Mrs. Soffel, directed by Gillian Armstrong, and The Cotton Club, directed by Francis Ford Coppola
- Kael, Pauline (January 14, 1985). "The Current Cinema: Unloos'd Dreams". The New Yorker. Vol. 60, no. 48. pp. 112–115. Reviews A Passage to India, directed by David Lean
- Kael, Pauline (January 28, 1985). "The Current Cinema: Lovers and Fools". The New Yorker. Vol. 60, no. 50. pp. 86–91. Reviews Micki and Maude, directed by Blake Edwards; Starman, directed by John Carpenter; The Flamingo Kid, directed by Garry Marshall

== See also ==
- Women in film
- Andrew Sarris
- Auteur theory
- Film criticism
- The New Yorker
- Susan Sontag
