= Lucchese =

Lucchese may refer to:

- A.S. Lucchese Libertas 1905, a football team based in Lucca, Tuscany
- Lucchese crime family, one of the "Five Families" of New York City's Mafia
- Lucchese School, an art school in Tuscany, Italy that flourished in the 11th and 12th centuries
- Lucchese Boot Company, a Western-style boot company from Texas

== People with the surname ==
- Antonio Franchi (1638–1709), Italian painter called Il Lucchese
- Francesco Paolo Lucchese (1935–2025), Italian politician
- Giuseppe Lucchese (born 1959), Sicilian mobster
- Josephine Lucchese (1893–1974), American opera singer
- Laurent Lucchese (born 1973), French rugby league footballer who played in the 1990s
- Sam Lucchese (1868–1929), Italian-born founder of Lucchese Boot Company and theater owner in San Antonio, Texas
- Tommy Lucchese (1899–1967), New York mobster and former boss of the Lucchese crime family

== See also ==
- Lucca, an Italian city and province
- Lucca Sicula, a town in the Province of Agrigento, Sicily, Italy
- Lucchesi (surname)
