= Lucchesi =

Lucchesi is an Italian surname. Notable people with the surname include:

- Andrea Carlo Lucchesi (1860–1924), Anglo-Italian sculptor
- Andrea Luchesi, also spelled Lucchesi (1741–1801), Italian composer
- Bruno Lucchesi (1926–2026), Italian-American sculptor
- Didier Lucchesi (born 1970), French conductor
- Frank Lucchesi (1927–2019), American professional baseball player, manager and coach
- Gary Lucchesi (born 1955), American film producer
- Gianmarco Lucchesi (2000), Italian rugby union player
- Giorgio Lucchesi (1855–1941), Italian painter
- Giulio Maria Lucchesi (died after 1799), 18th-century Italian violinist and composer
- Joey Lucchesi (born 1993), American professional baseball pitcher
- Joseph Count Lucchesi d’ Averna (died 1757), lieutenant field marshal in the Habsburg Army during the Seven Years' War
- Keira Lucchesi (contemporary), Scottish actress
- Matteo Lucchesi (1705–1776), Italian architect and engineer
- Salvatore Lucchesi (born 1882, date of death unknown), Italian sports shooter

Fictional characters

- Licio Lucchesi, in the 1990 American crime film The Godfather Part III

== Other uses ==
- Colline Lucchesi, a wine region in northern Tuscany, Italy
- Lucchesi Park, in Petaluma, California
- Santa Croce e San Bonaventura dei Lucchesi, a church in Rome, sited on via dei Lucchesi in the Trevi district

== See also ==
- Lucca, Italian city and province, for which "Lucchesi" is the demonym
- Lucchese (disambiguation)
