= Life partner (disambiguation) =

A life partner is a long-term romantic partner.

Life partner may also refer to:

- Life Partner, a 2009 Bollywood film
- Life Partners, a 2014 American film
- Life Partners, Inc., an American life settlement provider

== See also ==
- Life Partnership Act (disambiguation)
