= Alameda Theatre (San Antonio) =

Historic Spanish-language theatre

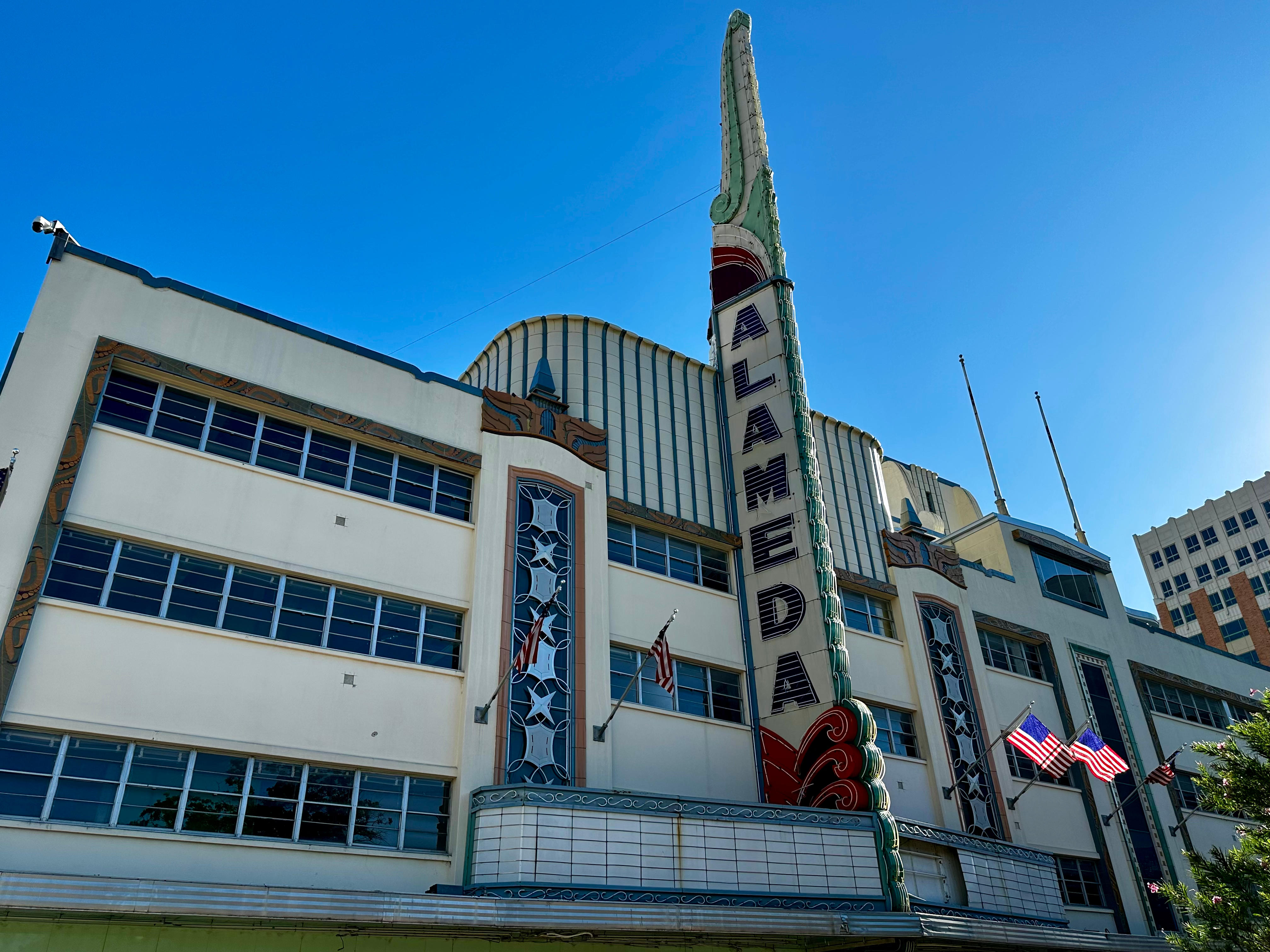
- Alameda's marquee in 2025
- Interactive map of Alameda Theatre
- Address: 318 W Houston St.
- Location: San Antonio, Texas
- Coordinates: 29.42633°N 98.4968°W
- Capacity: 2,500

Construction
- Opened: 10 March 1949
- Renovated: 2003, 2014, 2018 (ongoing)
- Architect: N. Straus Nayfach

The Alameda Theatre is a historic movie palace located in downtown San Antonio, Texas. Opened in 1949, the theatre was developed by entrepreneur Gaetano "Tano" Lucchese as a Spanish-language entertainment venue and cultural centre, serving the city's Mexican and Mexican American population. After years of decline the theatre is part of an ongoing restoration project. As of March 2026 the projected reopening date is early 2028.

== History ==
Gaetano Lucchese was the son of Sam Lucchese and part of the Italian family behind the Lucchese Boot Company. Gaetano continued his father's tradition of operating Spanish language theatres with two other venues in San Antonio, before building the Alameda.

The Alameda Theatre was designed by architect N. Straus Nayfach, who was the architect for some of the homes in the Monticello Park Historic District and worked on the design of the Temple Beth-El. Nayfach died in June 1948, at the age of 41, before the theatre's opening. The theatre belongs to the tradition of Streamline Moderne and has been identified by San Antonio architect Killis Almond, who worked on the 2000-2003 exterior restoration, as one of the finest examples of Mexican-American architecture in the United States. The design involved a complex roof arrangement, coloured tiles, and the use of fluorescent paint to glow in different lighting conditions. There were murals on either side of the stage by Pedro Teran, a local artist. The east side of the stage has artwork relating the history of Mexico, and the west side to depictions of San Antonio's history.

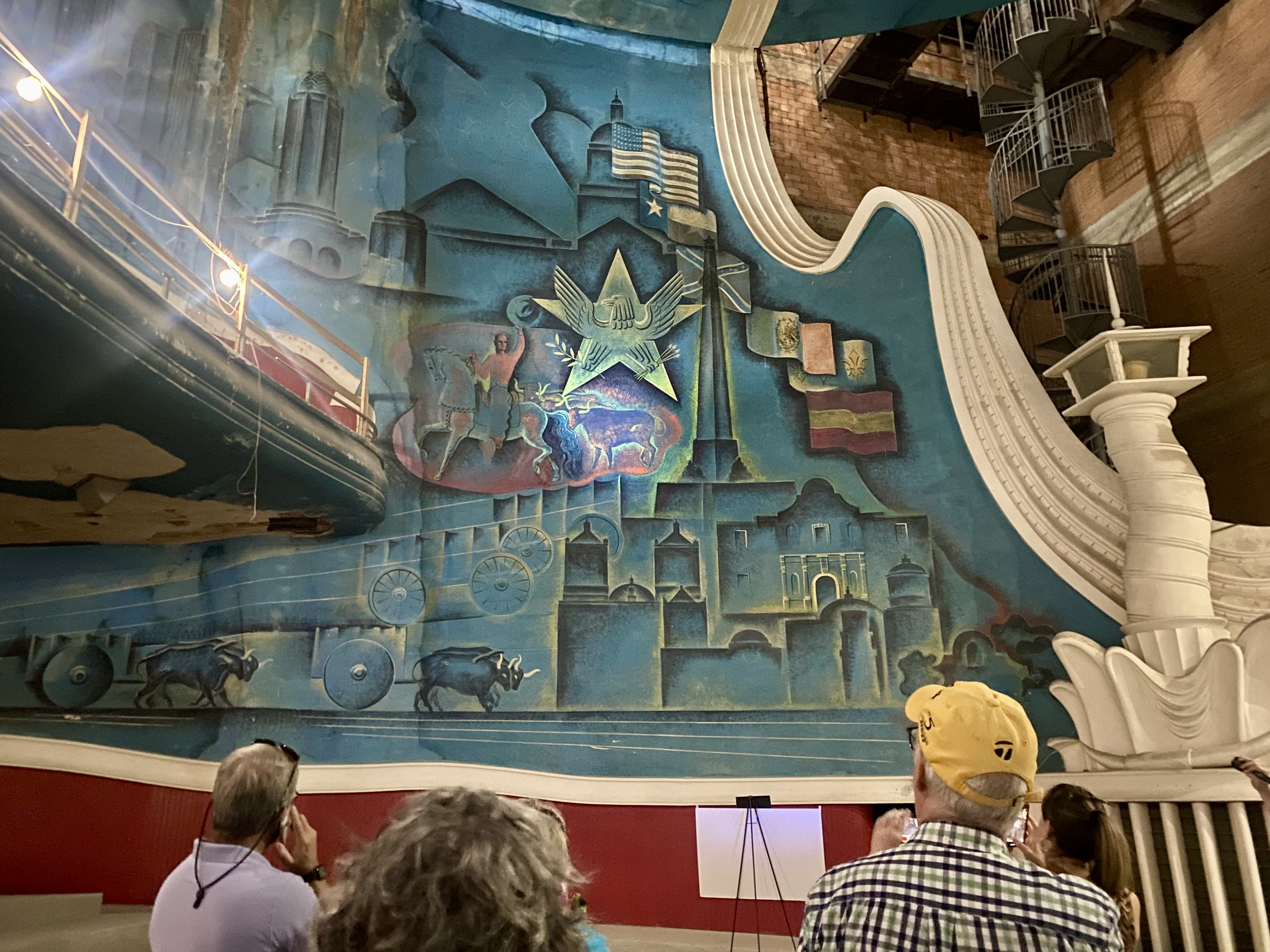
Theatre interior in 2025 - San Antonio's history

The theatre opened for business on 10 March 1949, featuring a performance from operatic soprano Josephine Lucchese, sister of Gaetano. The venue had a seating capacity of 2,500, and was the largest theatre dedicated to Spanish language performances in the United States. Unlike some other theatres in the area the seating was desegregated.

The theatre is eye catching for its external 86 feet (26 m) marquee, which used cold cathode lighting rather than neon. This meant the sign glowed four times more brightly than a neon equivalent.

The Alameda Theatre hosted the stars of Mexico's Golden Age and served as a cultural hub for Mexican‑American audiences. During its heyday, the theatre hosted performances from many popular Mexican-American artists, including Cantinflas, Pedro Infante, Maria Félix and Vicente Fernández. Many of the performances took the format of variedades, a vaudeville style of variety shows.

In addition to its entertainment facilities, the building hosted the first Mexican-American Chamber of Commerce, and the Mexican Consulate. Gustavo C. Garcia, the civil rights litigator, had his offices in the building.

After closing in the late 1980s, the theatre remained largely untouched, preserving murals, architecture, and memories that reflect San Antonio's multicultural history.

== Jesse Treviño's painting ==
One of the exhibits at the San Antonio Museum of Art, and on their website, is a hyperrealistic painting of the theatre's exterior and marquee, by Jesse Treviño. Treviño was born in Mexico and spent most of his life in San Antonio. He painted the theatre in 1980, stating: "The year I painted it, it seemed like no one cared about it. That's why I painted it." Treviño sold the painting, El Alameda, to Lionel Sosa in 1981 for $17,000, paid in monthly instalments.

== Restoration ==
The Alameda Theatre's original 1949 Art Deco façade underwent restoration from 2000 to 2003, but this contrasted sharply with its long‑neglected interior, which has sat unused and deteriorating for more than two decades. The initial round of interior restoration was completed in April 2014 by Ernest Bromley and Alameda Theater Inc., covering the main backstage upgrades — the first phase of what was originally a $25 million restoration project — funded by county and city contributions.

A further restoration partnership was announced in 2018 — involving the City of San Antonio, Bexar County, the Cortez family, and Texas Public Radio — which aimed to revive the Alameda as a multimedia performing arts and film centre. Renovation plans included reducing capacity to 1,200 seats, and upgrading sound and lighting. Preserving the historic features and décor was part of this revised plan, with construction scheduled to finish by the end of 2020. The Alameda Theater Conservancy was set up in 2017 to oversee the project.

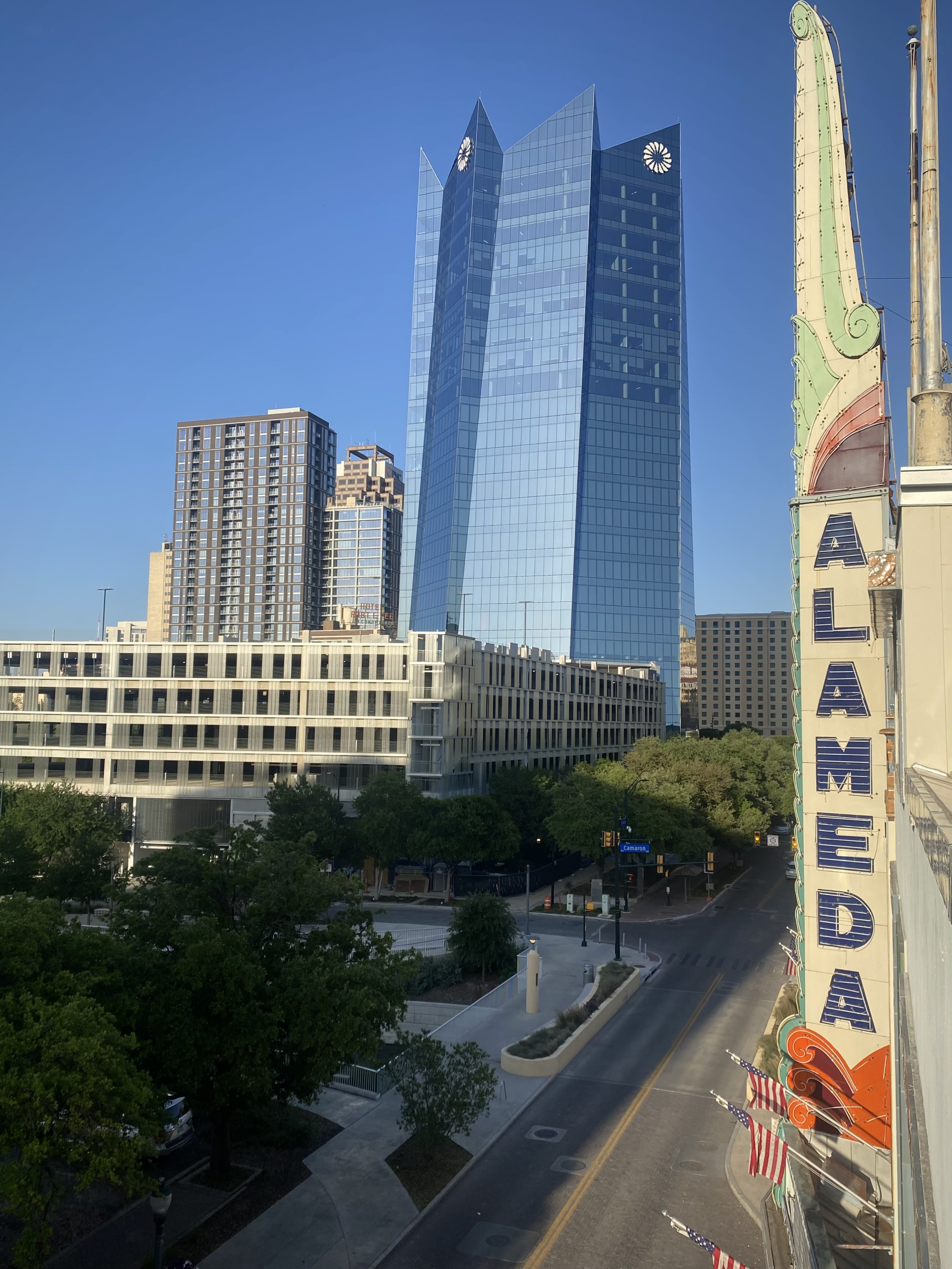
Alameda Theatre's marquee and with the neighbouring Frost Tower in 2025.

As of March 2026 the project costs to completion are estimated at $64.4 million, due to construction costs and delays from the COVID-19 pandemic, with significant financial contributions from the local government institutions for the city of San Antonio and Bexar County. The city originally acquired the property in 1994 at a cost of $994,000.

== Future plans ==
Among the potential ideas for the final venue are hosting touring productions, Latino comedy, classic Mexican cinema, film festivals, and local arts groups, while also supporting creative‑economy jobs. The Conservancy has contracted ATG Entertainment to operate the theatre, with half the ticketed events to have Latino oriented entertainment.

== Current use ==
The Henry Ford Academy: Alameda School for Art and Design, a charter art school, operated on the site between 2014 and 2024, on a ten year lease. Since 2017, Texas Public Radio have their offices in the former stage house, a building at the back of the theatre.
