= Kareem Serageldin =

Banker, former employee of Credit Suisse

- Born: 1973 (age 52–53); Cairo, Egypt
- Education: Yale University (1994)
- Known for: The only banker in the United States to serve jail time as a result of the 2008 financial crisis

Kareem Serageldin (/ˈsɛrəɡɛldɪn/) (born in 1973) is a former executive at Credit Suisse. He is notable for being the only banker in the United States to be sentenced to jail time as a result of the 2008 financial crisis, a conviction resulting from mismarking bond prices to hide losses.

== Early life and education ==
Serageldin was born in Cairo, Egypt to parents of modest means. He spent some of his childhood in the Upper Peninsula of Michigan in the United States. He graduated from Yale University in 1994.

== Career ==
Upon graduating in 1994, he joined the information technology department of Credit Suisse. He moved to London 4 years later to work in the bank's catastrophe bonds business. By age 33, he was named the global head of structured credit. By 2007, he was supervising 70 employees and more than $50 billion in trading positions. Despite earning approximately $7 million per year, Serageldin lived modestly; his apartment overlooking London Victoria station was described by his friends as "a grown-up dorm room".

By early 2008, he was fired from Credit Suisse and was reported to the United States Attorney for the Southern District of New York for falsifying records.

== Conviction ==
On February 1, 2012, Serageldin was charged by Preet Bharara, the United States Attorney for the Southern District of New York, and the Federal Bureau of Investigation as well as the U.S. Securities and Exchange Commission.

On April 12, 2013, Serageldin pleaded guilty to fraudulently inflating the prices of asset-backed bonds which comprised subprime residential mortgage backed securities and commercial mortgage backed securities in Credit Suisse's trading book in late 2007 and early 2008.

On November 22, 2013, Judge Alvin Hellerstein sentenced Serageldin to 30 months in prison. Serageldin also agreed to return $25.6 million in compensation to Credit Suisse.

On January 21, 2014, Serageldin was ordered to pay more than $1 million to settle the lawsuit by the U.S. Securities and Exchange Commission. He was also effectively barred from the securities industry.

Serageldin said he committed the crime "To preserve my reputation in the bank at a time when there was great financial turmoil".

He served at the Moshannon Valley Correctional Center and was released in March 2016.

== See also ==
- List of major SEC enforcement actions (2009–12)
