= John Muse (businessman) =

American businessman, polo player and philanthropist

- Born: Fort Worth, Texas, USA
- Education: United States Air Force Academy; UCLA
- Occupation: Chairman of Lucchese Boot Company
- Spouse: Lyn Muse

John Muse is an American businessman, polo player and philanthropist.

== Early life ==
John Muse was born in Fort Worth, Texas. He graduated from the United States Air Force Academy in 1973, where he played intercollegiate lacrosse, and received an M.B.A. from UCLA in 1974.

== Career ==
From 1980 to 1984, he served as Senior Vice President and a Director of Schneider, Bernet & Hickman in Dallas. From 1984 to 1989, he directed the investment banking activities of Prudential Securities for the Southwestern United States market. In 1989, he co-founded HM Capital Partners, a hedge fund, with Tom Hicks. He moved to London in 1998 to expand the hedge fund in the European market. He is a member of the 21st Century Group and Senior Advisor of Gerken Capital Associates, two investment firms.

He is Chairman of the Lucchese Boot Company, best known for selling cowboy boots. He is also Chairman of the Board of Kainos Capital and Arena Brands. He sits on the Board of Directors of Dean Foods, Swift and Co, two food corporations, and Cooper Gay Swett & Crawford, a reinsurance corporation. He has served on the boards of Life Partners, the Regal Entertainment Group, International Home Foods, Burton's Biscuit Company, Viatel Holding Ltd., Sunrise Television Corporation, Premier Foods, EurotaxGlass International AG, Lion Capital LLP, and the Morningstar Group.

Muse was appointed a member of the Board of Directors of Nexstar Media Group in January 2017, and is currently serving on the Nominating and Corporate Governance Committee.

== Philanthropy ==
He serves on the board of the UCLA Anderson School of Management and the Cox School of Business at Southern Methodist University.

== Polo ==
He learned to play polo at the Ascot Park Polo Club in Ascot, Berkshire, England in 2001. He sponsors the Lucchese Polo Team. Other players include Adolfo Cambiaso, Andres Weisz, Jason Crowder, Santiago Torres and Sebastian Merlos.

== Personal life ==
He is married to Lyn Muse, a UCLA alumnus and interior designer. They have five children. They live in a US$50 million mansion in Highland Park, Texas (a suburb of Dallas, Texas). The house was designed by British architect Quinlan Terry, and completed in 2001. It is built in the Neo-Palladian style.
