= KTPR =

KTPR may refer to:

- KTPR (FM), a radio station (89.9 FM) licensed to serve Stanton, Texas, United States
- KNSK, a radio station (91.1 FM) licensed to serve Fort Dodge, Iowa, United States, which held the call sign KTPR until 2012
