= KCTI =

- Gonzales, Texas; United States
- Broadcast area: Gonzales County, Texas
- Frequency: 1450 kHz

Programming
- Format: News/Talk
- Network: Texas Public Radio
- Affiliations: NPR, PRI, American Public Media

Ownership
- Owner: Texas Public Radio

History
- First air date: November 17, 1947
- Call sign meaning: "Cradle of Texas Independence"

Technical information
- Licensing authority: FCC
- Facility ID: 24564
- Class: C
- Power: 1,000 watts
- Transmitter coordinates: 1450: 29°30′35.9″N 97°24′52″W; 92.5: 29°29′9.9″N 97°29′18″W
- Translator: 92.5 K223CZ (Gonzales)

Links
- Public license information: Public file; LMS
- Website: http://tpr.org

KCTI (1450 AM, 92.5 FM; Texas Public Radio) is an American terrestrial public radio station, paired with an FM translator, licensed to Gonzales, Texas, and owned by Texas Public Radio of San Antonio.

From November 17, 1947 until August 31, 2015, KCTI broadcast a Texas Country format under the ownership of Gonzales Communications. KCTI returned to the air on January 2, 2017, with new ownership, featuring a public radio format of News/Talk/Entertainment. KCTI is now owned and operated by Texas Public Radio, based in San Antonio, Texas.

In March 2016, the KCTI call letters were allowed to be reused by Maranatha Church of Laredo, by former KCTI owner Gonzales Communications, for fellow Gonzales licensed 88.1 KITG, as KCTI-FM. This was challenged by KCTI's new owners, Texas Public Radio, which had purchased KCTI from Gonzales Communications, resulting in a request being sent to the Federal Communications Commission by T.P.R. asking the commission to force Sun Radio to abandon the callsign they felt rightfully belonged to them, and select another one in its place. In response to Texas Public Radio, the Commission stated that it never would have allowed the use of a secondary call sign without “approval from user” of the primary callsign. In this case, it said the former 1450 KCTI General Manager's email saying he had no problem with the FM station using KCTI-FM was good enough, and had approval of the KCTI ownership at the time the deal was made. Therefore, Sun Radio was allowed to continue using the FM side of the KCTI call, even though they do not own the original AM facility, nor have the approval of the present KCTI ownership, for the two facilities to share the longtime heritage Gonzales based calls.

KCTI-FM operates as a Sun Radio affiliate with local programming consisting of Gonzales Apache football & Sunday morning local church service broadcasts.

== History ==
KCTI went on air on December 17, 1947. The late Lawrence Walshak and the late Frank "Woody" Wilson Jr. made radio in Gonzales a reality, when they signed on the air Dec. 17, 1947. A hearing was held to secure the 1450 AM frequency. There were five different applications for the frequency including the San Antonio Express. The station was sold in 1983 to Patrick Nugent who operated the station again from 1993 to 1995 when it was sold to William Mann.

KCTI brought listeners a country radio station with a blend of Texas country, current country hits, and country classics. It also used to broadcast the syndicated Texas Country Weekend program.

Specialty programming on KCTI included Gonzales Apaches sports, 1450 Polka Club, local and area news, plus news from the Texas State Network.

KCTI programming focused on Gonzales County, Texas and the Guadalupe Valley. With little fanfare, KCTI signed off the air on August 31, 2015.

Today, Sun Radio operates KCTI-FM at 88.1 in Gonzales with coverage into Shiner, Seguin, Luling & surrounding communities. As of January 2, 2017, Texas Public Radio operates KCTI-AM at 1450 in Gonzales and broadcasts Local News, statewide news like "Texas Standard", and National/International News Programming from NPR and BBC.
