= List of major SEC enforcement actions (2009–2012) =

The following list reflects major actions that the Enforcement Division of the United States Securities and Exchange Commission (SEC) brought in 2009–2012.

The SEC is a federal agency of the United States. It holds primary responsibility for enforcing the federal securities laws and regulating the securities industry, the nation's stock and options exchanges, and other electronic securities markets in the United States.

The Enforcement Division works with the SEC's other three divisions, and other Commission offices, to investigate violations of the securities laws and regulations and to bring actions against alleged violators. The SEC generally conducts investigations in private. The SEC's staff may seek voluntary production of documents and testimony, or may seek a formal order of investigation from the SEC, which allows the staff to compel the production of documents and witness testimony. The SEC can bring a civil action in a U.S. District Court, or an administrative proceeding which is heard by an independent administrative law judge (ALJ). The SEC does not have criminal authority, but may refer matters to state and federal prosecutors. The director of the SEC's Enforcement Division Robert Khuzami left the office in February 2013.

== List ==
=== 2009 ===
- In June 2009, the SEC sued Angelo Mozilo, former CEO of mortgage lender Countrywide Financial, and two other former officers, charging that they misled investors about the quality of Countrywide's loans while knowing the company was fueling its growth by letting its underwriting guidelines deteriorate and originating a growing number of risky subprime loans. In October 2010, the SEC settled the lawsuit and Mozilo was required to pay a fraction of the $521.5 million he had earned, just $67.5 million in penalties and disgorgement.
- In August 2009, the SEC filed a suit against Bank of America, alleging that the bank failed to disclose $3.6 billion in bonuses that Merrill Lynch paid its employees. In January 2010, the SEC filed another suit against the bank, alleging it failed to disclose extraordinary fourth-quarter 2008 losses at Merrill Lynch prior to a December 5, 2008 shareholder vote to approve a merger between it and Merrill Lynch. In February 2010, Jed S. Rakoff, a federal judge derided, but approved a settlement to resolve the lawsuits, having rejected a previous settlement for $33 million as too small. He called the new agreement "inadequate and misguided" because the penalties were "very modest".
- In October 2009, relying on informants and wiretaps, Raj Rajaratnam and his hedge fund, Galleon Group, were charged with an insider trading scheme that generated more than $25 million in illicit gains. Six others involved in the scheme were also charged, including senior executives at IBM, Intel and McKinsey & Company. Overall, the SEC in the Galleon series of cases has charged 29 defendants for widespread and repeated insider trading in the securities of more than 15 publicly traded companies, generating illicit profits or losses avoided of more than $90 million. The investigation involves cash payments by Rajaratnam and Galleon in exchange for material nonpublic information, and the investigation has ensnared corporate executives, consultants, rating agency personnel, proprietary traders, hedge fund executives, and public relations personnel. Rajaratnam was sentenced to 11 years in prison in the parallel criminal case, and the court entered a final judgment in the SEC civil case holding him liable for a civil penalty of $92.8 million, representing the largest penalty ever assessed against an individual in an SEC insider trading case.
- In December 2009, three former executives of New Century Financial Corporation were charged with conspiring to mislead investors by not disclosing dramatic increases in the rate of borrowers who were defaulting almost immediately on their loans.

=== 2010 ===
- In April 2010, the SEC filed a suit against Goldman Sachs and one of its vice presidents, Fabrice Tourre, alleging that the firm misled investors with respect to a subprime mortgage product. The SEC charged that Goldman and Tourre did not inform clients that what they bought was crafted in part by hedge fund manager John Paulson, who was betting the product would fail. In July 2010, Goldman Sachs agreed to pay $550 million to settle the case, among the largest penalties ever assessed in the 76-year history of the SEC, although just 1% of Goldman's market value at the time and 2% of its cash balance in March 2010, and considered to be a "slap on the wrist". The penalties prompted a sigh of relief from Goldman and Wall Street. In announcing the settlement, Robert Khuzami, current director of the Enforcement Division, twice referred to it as "more than half a billion dollars", but Michael J. Driscoll, a professor and former senior managing director at Bear Stearns called it "a steal". A former SEC commissioner, Paul Atkins, said he was "embarrassed, as an American," describing the suit as "basically playing for headlines with very little substance". Eliot Spitzer said Goldman's reaction was "OK, we'll pay you $550 million to settle the Abacus case — that's a small price to pay for the $12.9 billion we got for the AIG bailout." Khuzami states that the penalty paid by Goldman Sachs ($535 million) was "30 to 40 times" what the firm hoped to earn from the Abacus deal ($15 million), and such a significant penalty sends a "cold, hard and sharp" message to Wall Street and risk managers that they better think twice before undertaking transactions that violate the law.
- In July 2010, Citigroup, with a market cap of $120 billion, agreed to pay a $75 million penalty to the SEC for its failure to adequately disclose its exposure to subprime mortgage debt. Citigroup advised investors it held $13 billion in subprime investments when in fact it was more than $50 billion. Fines for misconduct were also assessed against the former chief financial officer, Gary Crittenden, and director of investor relations, Arthur Tildesley.
- In September 2010, John Flannery, a former chief investment officer of State Street Bank & Trust Company, and James Hopkins, a former product engineer there, were charged with misleading investors about the bank's exposure to subprime investments. Earlier in the year, the SEC announced a settlement in which State Street agreed to pay $313 million in connection with the charges.
- In October 2010, the SEC charged two hedge fund portfolio managers and their investment advisory businesses, Palisades Asset Management, LLC with overvaluing illiquid fund assets they placed in a "side pocket," misappropriating investor assets, and making material misrepresentations in connection with a securities offering.
- In December 2010, the SEC, the Department of Justice and other federal and state agencies announced the results of "Operation Broken Trust", a coordinated effort by the Financial Fraud Enforcement Task Force to target investment fraud. The operation resulted in prosecutions against 310 criminal defendants involving $8.3 billion in losses and civil actions against 189 defendants involving $2.1 billion in losses for fraud schemes that victimized more than 120,000 people throughout the country.

=== 2011 ===
In FY 2011, the Enforcement Division filed 735 actions, an 8.6% increase over FY 2010 and more than any other year in SEC history. It also obtained $2.8 billion in penalties and disgorgement. More significantly, the filed actions involve many highly complex markets, products and transactions, as well as charges against a significant number of individuals. One commentator noted that despite budget and other restraints, the SEC has recently "had a string of successes," and has made progress "despite every disadvantage".

A sampling of FY 2011 and 2012 cases are set forth below.

- In January 2011, the SEC charged Merrill Lynch with fraud for misusing customer order information to place proprietary trades for the firm and for charging customer undisclosed trading fees.
- Also in January 2011, the SEC charged two Charles Schwab & Co. entities and two executives for failing to disclose the risks of investing in the YieldPlus fund, including its over-concentration in mortgage assets and that it was not, as Schwab advertised, a cash alternative that had only slightly higher risk than a money market fund.
- In February 2011, the Commission brought charges in the "expert networking" insider trading cases, charging several technology company employees with tipping material nonpublic information concerning sales, earnings, and other performance data of their employers to multiple hedge funds and other investment professionals.
- In February 2011, the SEC charged DHB Industries, a major supplier of body armor to the U.S. military and law enforcement agencies, for engaging in a large accounting fraud, and in addition separately charged three of DHB's former outside directors and audit committee members for their complicity in the scheme.
- In March 2011, the SEC charged three senior executives at Fair Finance Company with orchestrating a $230 million fraudulent scheme involving at least 5,200 investors, many of them elderly, by selling them interest-bearing certificates allegedly used to purchase and service discounted consumer finance contracts, but instead diverting the proceeds to themselves and others for luxury personal goods as well as to struggling and unprofitable entities that they controlled.
- In March 2011, the Commission charged Cheng Yi Liang, a chemist at the U.S. Food and Drug Administration (FDA), with insider trading by trading securities using highly confidential information relating to FDA drug approvals that he accessed from an FDA database.
- In April 2011, the Commission charged Matthew Kluger, a former corporate attorney, and Garrett Bauer, a Wall Street trader, for their involvement in a highly organized serial insider trading ring that traded in advance of at least 11 pending merger and acquisition announcements involving clients of the law firm Wilson Sonsini Goodrich & Rosati.
- In April 2011, the SEC charged Wachovia with misconduct related to the sale of two collateralized debt obligations (CDOs), including charging excessive markups in sales to the Zuni Indian Tribe, and falsely representing that it acquired CDO assets at fair market prices when, in fact, 40 residential mortgage-backed securities (RMBs) were transferred from an affiliate at above-market prices to avoid losses on its own books.
- In April 2011, the Commission charged Dr. Joseph "Chip" Skowron, a former portfolio manager for six health care-related hedge funds, with insider trading in a bio-pharmaceutical company based on confidential information he received unlawfully about the company's negative clinical drug trial results.
- In May 2011, the Commission charged Donald L. Johnson, a former managing director of The NASDAQ Stock Market, with insider trading on confidential information that he misappropriated while working in a market intelligence unit that communicates with executives at listed companies about impending public announcements that could affect their stocks.
- In May, July and December 2011, the SEC charged J.P. Morgan Securities, Wachovia Bank and UBS Financial Services for participating in a wide-ranging scheme involving the fraudulent manipulation of municipal bond reinvestment transactions. Including previous actions filed against GE Funding Capital Market Services and Banc of America Securities, a total of approximately $743 million has been recovered in these settlements by all law enforcement agencies, including the SEC, involved in the cases.
- In June 2011, the SEC charged J.P. Morgan Securities and one individual with misleading investors in a complex mortgage securities transaction by not informing investors that a prominent hedge fund helped select the assets in the CDO portfolio and had a short position in more than half of those assets.
- In August 2011, the SEC charged Stifel, Nicolaus & Co. and a former senior vice president with defrauding five Wisconsin school districts by selling them synthetic CDOs funded largely with $200 million of borrowed money.
- In September 2011, the SEC charged AXA Rosenberg Group and its founder, Barr Rosenberg, with fraud for concealing a significant error in the computer code of the quantitative investment model used to manage client assets. AXA Rosenberg paid $217 million to compensate harmed investors and a $25 million penalty. Barr Rosenberg paid a $2.5 million penalty and was barred from the industry for life.
- In October 2011, the SEC sanctioned two electronic stock exchanges and a broker-dealer owned by Direct Edge Holdings LLC for violations arising out of weak controls that resulted in millions of dollars in trading losses and a systems outage.
- In October 2011, the SEC charged Pipeline Trading Systems LLC and two of its top executives with failing to disclose to customers of Pipeline's "dark pool" trading platform that the vast majority of orders were filled by a trading operation affiliated with Pipeline.
- In October 2011, the SEC charged Citigroup with misleading investors about a $1 billion CDO by exercising significant influence over the selection of assets included in the CDO portfolio, and then taking a proprietary short position against those mortgage-related assets from which it would profit if the assets declined in value. Citigroup agreed to settle the SEC's charges by paying a total of $285 million. The district court's rejection of the proposed settlement is on appeal to the Second Circuit Court of Appeals.
- In October 2011, the SEC charged former bank executives of California-based United Commercial Bank with concealing from investors large losses on several loans made by the bank and that appraisals for some of the loans had been reduced dramatically or that collateral securing the loans was insufficient or worthless.
- In October 2011, the SEC charged former McKinsey & Company Global Head Rajat Gupta with insider trading for illegally tipping Raj Rajaratnam with insider information about the quarterly earnings of both Goldman Sachs and Procter & Gamble, as well as an impending $5 billion investment in Goldman by Berkshire Hathaway at the height of the financial crisis.
- In October 2011, the SEC obtained an asset freeze against a Boston-area money manager and his investment advisory firm for misleading investors in a supposed quantitative hedge fund and diverting portions of investor money into his personal bank account. The SEC alleged that Andrey C. Hicks and Locust Offshore Management LLC made false representations to create an aura of legitimacy when soliciting individuals to invest in a purported billion dollar hedge fund that Hicks controlled called Locust Offshore Fund Ltd.
- In October 2011, the SEC filed an emergency action to halt a Ponzi scheme that promised investors rich returns on water-filtering natural stone pavers, but bilked them of approximately $26 million over a four-year period.
- In November 2011, the SEC charged Morgan Stanley Investment Management (MSIM) with violating the securities laws in a fee arrangement that repeatedly charged a fund and its investors for advisory services they were not actually receiving from a third party. The SEC's investigation found that MSIM represented to investors and the fund's board of directors that it contracted a Malaysian-based sub-adviser to provide advice, research, and assistance to MSIM for the benefit of the fund, which invests in equity securities of Malaysian companies. The sub-adviser did not provide these purported advisory services, yet the fund's board annually renewed the contract based on MSIM's representations for more than a decade at a total cost of $1.8 million to investors.
- In November and December 2011, the SEC filed several enforcement actions charging three advisory firms and six individuals as part of the Asset Management Unit's Aberrational Performance Inquiry to combat investment adviser fraud by identifying abnormal investment performance. The misconduct involved improper use of fund assets, fraudulent valuations, and misrepresenting fund returns. Under this initiative, proprietary risk analytics were used to evaluate hedge fund returns, identifying funds whose performance was inconsistent with its investment strategy or other benchmarks.
- In December 2011, the SEC filed the final two actions in a series of cases in a wide-ranging complex bid-rigging scheme involving several financial firms related to the reinvestment of proceeds from the sale of municipal securities. In these two actions, the SEC charged Wachovia Bank N.A. with fraudulently rigging the bids of at least 58 municipal bond reinvestment transactions in 25 states and Puerto Rico and General Electric Funding Capital Market Services with fraudulently rigging the bids of at least 328 municipal bond transactions in 44 states and Puerto Rico. The bid-rigging involved the temporary investment of proceeds of tax-exempt municipal securities. Wachovia paid $46 million and GE Funding paid $25 million in penalties, disgorgement, and interest to settle the SEC's charges. These firms also paid more than $167 million to settle actions with other federal and state authorities for this misconduct.
- In December 2011, the SEC charged Magyar Telekom PLC, Hungary's largest telecommunications provider, and three of its former top executives with bribing government and political party officials in Macedonia and Montenegro to win business and shut out competition in the telecommunications industry. Magyar Telekom agreed to settle the SEC's charges by paying more than $31.2 million in disgorgement and pre-judgment interest. Magyar Telekom also agreed to pay more than $59 million in criminal penalties to the U.S. Department of Justice.
- In December 2011, the SEC charged six former top executives of Fannie Mae and Freddie Mac, including two former CEOs, with misleading investors about the extent of each company's holdings of subprime and other higher-risk mortgages.
- In December 2011, the SEC charged seven former Siemens executives with anti-bribery violations for their actions in the decade-long bribery scheme to retain a $1 billion government contract to produce national identity cards for Argentine citizens.

=== 2012 ===
- In January 2012, the SEC charged two multibillion-dollar hedge fund advisory firms, Diamondback Capital and Level Global, as well as seven fund managers and analysts, involved in a $78 million insider trading scheme based on nonpublic material information about Dell's quarterly earnings and other similar inside information about Nvidia Corporation.
- In January 2012, the SEC charged a trader in Latvia for conducting a widespread online account intrusion scheme in which he manipulated the prices of more than 100 NYSE and Nasdaq securities and caused more than $2 million in harm to customers of U.S. brokerage firms. According to the SEC's complaint, Igors Nagaicevs broke into online brokerage accounts of customers at large U.S. broker-dealers and drove stock prices up or down by making unauthorized purchases or sales in the hijacked accounts. This occurred on more than 150 occasions over the course of 14 months.
- In January 2012, the SEC charged an Illinois-based investment adviser with offering to sell fictitious securities on LinkedIn and issued two alerts in an agency-wide effort to highlight the risks investors and advisory firms face when using social media. Anthony Fields offered more than $500 billion in fictitious securities through various social media websites. For example, he used LinkedIn discussions to promote fictitious "bank guarantees" and "medium-term notes".
- Also in January 2012, the SEC charged Texas-based financial services firm Life Partners Holdings and three of its senior executives for their involvement in a fraudulent disclosure and accounting scheme involving life settlements. The SEC alleges that Life Partners chairman and CEO, the president and general counsel, and the chief financial officer misled shareholders by failing to disclose a significant risk to Life Partners' business: the company was systematically and materially underestimating the life expectancy estimates it used to price transactions.
- In February 2012, the SEC charged four former investment bankers and traders at Credit Suisse Group for engaging in a complex scheme to fraudulently overstate the prices of $3.0 billion in subprime bonds during the height of the financial crisis.
- In two cases arising out of the SEC's Cross-Border Initiative, the SEC brought actions against China-based companies and their executives for making misleading statements to investors in U.S. stock markets. On February 22, 2012, the SEC charged two senior executives of Puda Coal, Inc. with defrauding investors into believing they were investing in a Chinese coal business when in fact they were investing in an empty shell company. The SEC also charged China-based China Sky One Medical Inc. and its chief executive with fraud for recording fake sales of a weight loss product to inflate revenues in the company's financial statements by millions of dollars.
- In February 2012, the SEC charged Douglas Whitman, a hedge fund manager, and his California-based firm, Whitman Capital, for their involvement in the insider trading ring connected to Raj Rajaratnam and Galleon Management. According to the SEC's complaint, Whitman and his firm traded on material, nonpublic information obtained from Rajaratnam's associate, Roomy Khan, who was Whitman's friend and neighbor.
- In February 2012, the SEC charged John Kinnucan and his Portland, Oregon-based expert consulting firm, Broadband Research Corporation, with insider trading. Kinnucan and Broadband claimed to be in the business of providing clients with legitimate research about technology companies, but instead they typically tipped clients with material, nonpublic information that Kinnucan obtained from prohibited sources inside the companies. Kinnucan was sentenced to 51 months in prison after conviction for securities fraud.
- In February 2012, the SEC charged London-based medical device company Smith & Nephew PLC with violating the FCPA when its U.S. and German subsidiaries bribed public doctors in Greece for more than a decade to win business. The SEC's complaint against Smith & Nephew PLC alleged that its subsidiaries used a distributor to create a slush fund to make illicit payments to public doctors employed by government hospitals or agencies in Greece. Smith & Nephew PLC and its U.S. subsidiary Smith & Nephew Inc. paid more than $22 million to settle the SEC's and DOJ's actions.
- In March 2012, the SEC charged the three senior-most executives at Thornburg Mortgage, formerly one of the nation's largest mortgage companies, with hiding the company's deteriorating financial condition at the onset of the financial crisis.
- In March 2012, the SEC charged two managers with making false statements and pocketing undisclosed fees and commissions in connection with two private investment funds established solely to acquire the shares of Facebook and other Silicon Valley firms. Also charged was SharesPost, an online service that matches buyers and sellers of pre-IPO (initial public offering) stock, for engaging in securities transactions without registering as a broker-dealer.
- In March 2012, the SEC charged Indiana-based medical device company Biomet with violating the FCPA when its subsidiaries and agents bribed public doctors in Argentina, Brazil and China for nearly a decade to win business.
- In March 2012, the SEC announced that a federal judge ordered the former CEO of Brookstreet Securities Corp., Stanley C. Brooks, to pay a maximum $10 million penalty related to the fraud action that the SEC filed against Brooks for systematically selling risky mortgage-backed securities during the financial crisis to customers with conservative investment goals.
- In April 2012, the SEC charged H&R Block subsidiary Option One Mortgage Corporation with misleading investors in several offerings of subprime residential mortgage-backed securities by failing to disclose that its financial condition was significantly deteriorating and that it could not meet its repurchase obligations on its own. Option One paid $28.2 million to settle the SEC's charges.
- In April 2012, the SEC charged Chicago-based optionsXpress, an online brokerage and clearing agency specializing in options and futures, as well as its former chief financial officer and a customer involved in an abusive naked short selling scheme. optionsXpress failed to satisfy its close-out obligations under Regulation SHO by repeatedly engaging in a series of sham "reset" transactions designed to give the illusion that the firm had purchased securities of like kind and quantity.
- In April 2012, the SEC charged AutoChina International Limited and 11 investors, including a senior executive and director at the China-based firm, with conducting a market manipulation scheme to create the false appearance of a liquid and active market for AutoChina's stock. Starting in October 2010, the defendants and others deposited more than $60 million into U.S.-based brokerage accounts and engaged in hundreds of fraudulent trades over the next three months through these accounts and accounts with a Hong Kong-based broker-dealer. The fraudulent trades included matched orders, where one account sold shares to another account at the same time and for the same price, and wash trades, which resulted in no change of beneficial ownership of the shares.
- In April 2012, the SEC charged Garth R. Peterson, a former executive at Morgan Stanley's real estate investment and fund advisory business, with violating the FCPA as well as securities laws for investment advisers by secretly acquiring millions of dollars of real estate investments for himself and an influential Chinese official who in turn steered business to Morgan Stanley's funds.
- Also in April 2012, the SEC filed an emergency action to halt an ongoing Ponzi scheme that targeted members of the Persian-Jewish community in Los Angeles. The SEC alleged that for the past two years, Shervin Neman raised more than $7.5 million from investors by claiming to be a hedge fund manager. Neman raised funds from at least 11 investors in the fraudulent securities offering, and more than 99% of the money Neman raised was used either to pay existing investors or fund his lavish lifestyle.
- In April 2012, the SEC charged Egan-Jones Ratings Company (EJR) and Sean Egan, its owner and president, for material misrepresentations and omissions in the company's July 2008 application to register as a Nationally Recognized Statistical Rating Organization (NRSRO) for issuers of asset-backed securities (ABS) and government securities.
- Also in April 2012, the SEC also charged that Goldman, Sachs & Co. lacked adequate policies and procedures to address the risk that during weekly "huddles," the firm's analysts could share material, nonpublic information about upcoming research changes. Huddles were a practice where Goldman's stock research analysts met to provide their best trading ideas to firm traders and later passed them on to a select group of top clients.
- In April 2012, the SEC charged Franklin Bank's former CEO and CFO for their involvement in a fraudulent scheme designed to conceal the deterioration of the bank's loan portfolio and inflate its reported earnings during the financial crisis.
- In May 2012, the SEC charged UBS Puerto Rico and two executives with making misrepresentations about the liquidity and pricing of 23 proprietary closed-end funds, and concealing that it advantaged its own proprietary trades over those of its customers as it reduced its exposure to these assets.
- In May 2012, the SEC suspended trading in the securities of 379 dormant companies before they could be hijacked by fraudsters and used to harm investors through reverse mergers or pump-and-dump schemes. The trading suspension marks the most companies ever suspended in a single day by the Commission as it ramps up its crackdown against fraud involving microcap shell companies that are dormant and delinquent in their public disclosures.
- In May 2012, the SEC charged a former executive at Yahoo! and a former mutual fund manager at a subsidiary of Ameriprise Financial with insider trading on confidential information about a search engine partnership between Yahoo and Microsoft Corporation. The SEC alleged that Robert W. Kwok, who was Yahoo's senior director of business management, breached his duty to the company when he told Reema D. Shah in July 2009 that a deal between Yahoo and Microsoft would be announced soon.
- In May 2012, the SEC brought an enforcement action against Shanghai-based Deloitte Touche Tohmatsu CPA Ltd. for its refusal to provide the agency with audit work papers related to a China-based company under investigation for potential accounting fraud against U.S. investors.
- In May 2012, the SEC charged former Detroit Mayor Kwame M. Kilpatrick, former City Treasurer Jeffrey W. Beasley, and MayfieldGentry Realty Advisors LLC, the investment adviser to Detroit's public pension funds, for a pay-to-play scheme involving the secret exchange of lavish gifts in exchange for influence over the funds' investment process. The SEC alleged that Kilpatrick and Beasley, who were trustees to the pension funds, solicited and received $125,000 worth of private jet travel and other perks paid for by MayfieldGentry, whose CEO, Chauncey Mayfield, was recommending to the trustees that the pension funds invest approximately $117 million in a real estate investment trust controlled by the firm.
- In June 2012, the SEC filed fraud charges against New York-based hedge fund adviser Philip A. Falcone and his advisory firm, Harbinger Capital Partners LLC, for illicit conduct that included misappropriation of client assets, market manipulation, and betraying clients. The SEC alleged that Falcone fraudulently obtained $113.2 million from a hedge fund that he advised and misappropriated the proceeds to pay his personal taxes; secretly favored certain customers at the expense of others by granting favorable redemption and liquidity rights to certain strategically important investors in exchange for those investors' consent to restrict redemption rights of other fund investors; and that Harbinger engaged in illegal trades in connection with the purchase of common stock in three public offerings after having sold the same securities short during a restricted period.
- In June 2012, the SEC charged investment management company OppenheimerFunds and its sales and distribution arm with making misleading statements about two of its mutual funds struggling in the midst of the financial crisis, including the fund's practice of assuming substantial leverage in using derivative instruments. Oppenheimer paid more than $35 million to settle the SEC's charges.
- In June 2012, the SEC charged 14 sales agents who misled investors and illegally sold securities for a Long Island-based investment firm at the center of a $415 million Ponzi scheme. The SEC alleged that the sales agents, including four sets of siblings, falsely promised investor returns as high as 12 to 14% in several weeks when they sold investments offered by Agape World, Inc. They also misled investors to believe that only 1% of their principal was at risk. The Agape securities they peddled were actually non-existent, and investors were merely lured into a Ponzi scheme where earlier investors were paid with new investor funds.
- Also in June 2012, the SEC took emergency action to halt a real estate-based Ponzi scheme that defrauded more than 600 investors nationwide of $100 million. The SEC's action charged Wayne L. Palmer and his firm, National Note of Utah, LC, with fraud in a scheme in which he raised money from investors by promising to use the proceeds to buy mortgage notes and other real estate assets. Contrary to Palmer's claims, National Note used most of the money it took in from new investors to pay earlier investors, making it a classic Ponzi scheme.
- In July 2012, the SEC charged five physicians with insider trading in the securities of an East Lansing, Michigan-based holding company for a medical professional liability insurer. The SEC alleged that Apparao Mukkamala learned confidential information from board meetings and other communications about the anticipated acquisition of American Physicians Capital Inc. by another insurance company. Mukkamala shared the nonpublic information with three physicians and friends as well as his brother-in-law.
- In July 2012, the SEC took emergency action to freeze the assets of traders using accounts in Hong Kong and Singapore to hold more than $13 million in illegal profits by trading in advance of a public announcement that China-based CNOOC Ltd. was acquiring Canada-based Nexen Inc. The SEC's complaint alleged that Hong Kong-based firm Well Advantage Ltd. and other unknown traders stockpiled shares of Nexen stock based on confidential information about the deal in the days leading up to the announcement. The SEC took the emergency action within days of the public announcement of the deal and less than 24 hours after Well Advantage placed an order to liquidate its entire position in Nexen.
- In July 2012, the SEC charged the chairman and CEO of a Santa Ana, California-based computer storage device company with insider trading in a secondary offering of his stock shares with knowledge of confidential information that a major customer's demand for one of its most profitable products was turning out to be less than expected.
- Also in July 2012, the SEC charged the U.S. investment banking subsidiary of Japan-based Mizuho Financial Group and three former employees with misleading investors in Delphinus CDO-2007-1 by using "dummy assets" to inflate the deal's credit ratings. Delphinus defaulted in 2008 and eventually was liquidated in 2010. Mizuho paid $127.5 million to settle the SEC's charges, and the others charged also settled the SEC's actions against them.
- In August 2012, the SEC charged James V. Mazzo, who was the Chairman and CEO of Advanced Medical Optics, and the source of DeCinces's illegal tips about the impending transaction. DeCinces and Mazzo are close friends and neighbors. The SEC also charged two others who traded on inside information that DeCinces tipped to them—DeCinces' former Baltimore Orioles teammate Eddie Murray and another friend David L. Parker, who is a businessman living in Utah. The SEC alleged that Murray made approximately $235,314 in illegal profits.
- In August 2012, the SEC charged Pfizer with violating the FCPA when its subsidiaries bribed doctors and other health care professionals employed by foreign governments in order to win business. The SEC also separately charged another pharmaceutical company that Pfizer acquired a few years ago—Wyeth LLC—with FCPA violations. Pfizer and Wyeth agreed to separate settlements in which they paid more than $45 million combined to settle their respective charges. In a parallel action, Pfizer H.C.P. Corporation paid a $15 million penalty to resolve the DOJ's FCPA investigation.
- Also in August 2012, the SEC charged Bruce Cole, former CEO and chairman of Mamtek U.S., for executing a scheme to defraud investors and making material misrepresentations and omissions in connection with the July 2010 offer and sale of $39 million of appropriations credit bonds backed by the City of Moberly, Missouri.
- In August 2012, the SEC filed fraud charges against a former college football coach who teamed with an Ohio man to conduct an $80 million Ponzi scheme that included other college coaches and former players among its victims. The SEC alleged that Jim Donnan, a College Football Hall of Fame inductee who guided teams at Marshall University and the University of Georgia and later became a television commentator, together with his business partner told investors that GLC was in the wholesale liquidation business and earned substantial profits by buying leftover merchandise from major retailers and reselling those discontinued, damaged, or returned products to discount retailers. However, only about $12 million of the $80 million raised from nearly 100 investors was actually used to purchase leftover merchandise; the remaining funds were used to pay fake returns to earlier investors or stolen for other uses by Donnan and Crabtree.
- Also in August 2012, the SEC filed fraud charges and an emergency asset freeze to halt a $600 million Ponzi scheme on the verge of collapse. The SEC alleged that online marketer Paul Burks of Lexington, North Carolina and his company Rex Venture Group had raised money from more than one million Internet customers nationwide and overseas through the website ZeekRewards.com, which they began in January 2011. Customers were allegedly offered several ways to earn money through the ZeekRewards program, two of which involved purchasing securities in the form of investment contracts. However, the website fraudulently conveyed the false impression that the company was extremely profitable when, in fact, the payouts to investors bore no relation to the company's net profits. Most of ZeekRewards' total revenues and the "net profits" paid to investors have been funds received from new investors in classic Ponzi scheme fashion.
- In August 2012, the SEC charged Wells Fargo for improperly selling asset-backed commercial paper (ABCP) structured with high-risk mortgage-backed securities and collateralized debt obligations (CDOs) to municipalities, non-profit institutions, and other customers, almost exclusively upon the basis of their credit ratings. According to the SEC's order, registered representatives in Wells Fargo's Institutional Brokerage and Sales Division made recommendations to institutional customers to purchase ABCP but did not review the private placement memoranda (PPMs) for the investments and the extensive risk disclosures in those documents. Instead, they relied almost exclusively on the credit ratings of these products despite various warnings against such over-reliance in the PPM and elsewhere. Wells Fargo also failed to establish any procedures to ensure that its personnel adequately reviewed and understood the nature and risks of these commercial paper programs.
- In September 2012, the SEC charged the former CEO, President and Chief Credit Officer of Lincoln, Nebraska-based TierOne Bank for participating in a scheme to understate millions of dollars in losses and mislead investors and federal regulators at the height of the financial crisis.
- In September 2012, the SEC settled charges with investment advisory firm ICP Asset Management and its founder and president Thomas C. Priore regarding allegations of fraud related to misrepresentations that caused the CDOs they managed to overpay for securities. In addition, the SEC alleged that Priore and ICP improperly obtained fees and undisclosed profits at the expense of the CDOs and their investors. ICP and Priore paid more than $23 million to settle the case. Priore also agreed to be barred from working in the securities industry for five years.
- In September 2012, the SEC charged Goldman, Sachs & Co. and one of its former investment bankers, Neil Morrison, with violations of various MSRB rules for undisclosed "in-kind" non-cash campaign contributions to then-Massachusetts State Treasurer Timothy P. Cahill while he was a candidate for governor.
- In September 2012, the SEC brought first-of-its-kind charges against the New York Stock Exchange for compliance failures that gave certain customers an improper head start on trading information. According to the SEC's order, NYSE violated Regulation NMS, which prohibits the practice of improperly sending market data to proprietary customers before broadly distributing trade and quote data to the public, over an extended period of time beginning in 2008 by sending data through two of its proprietary feeds before sending data to the consolidated feeds. NYSE's inadequate compliance efforts failed to monitor the speed of its proprietary feeds compared to its data transmission to the consolidated feeds. NYSE and its parent company, NYSE Euronext, agreed to a $5 million penalty and significant undertakings to settle the SEC's charges. It marks the first-ever SEC financial penalty against an exchange.
- That same month, the SEC charged a New York-based brokerage firm, Hold Brothers On-Line Investment Service, and three of its executives for allowing traders outside the U.S. to access the markets and conduct manipulative trading through accounts the firm controlled. The Soverseas traders were accessing the markets through the firm's customer accounts and repeatedly manipulating publicly traded stocks through an illegal practice known as "layering" or "spoofing". In layering, the trader places orders with no intention of having them executed but rather to trick others into buying or selling a stock at an artificial price driven by the orders that the trader later cancels.
- Also in September 2012, the SEC charged three former brokers at JP Turner, an Atlanta-based brokerage firm, for "churning" the accounts of customers with conservative investment objectives, resulting in losses to investors while the brokers collected significant fees. The SEC charged Michael Bresner, the head supervisor at JP Turner, as well as the firm's president, William Mello, and the firm itself for compliance failures.
- In October 2012, the SEC charged a New Jersey hedge fund, Yorkville Advisors LLC, developers of the Standby Equity Distribution Agreement and two of its directors with fraud, by scheming to overvalue assets. The case was dismissed in October 2018.
- In November 2012, the SEC charged JP Morgan Securities LLC and Credit Suisse Securities (USA) with misleading investors in RMBS offerings associated with the financial crisis. JP Morgan was charged with misstating information about the delinquency status of the mortgage loans underlying an RMBS offering, for which JP Morgan received more than $2.7 million in fees while investors lost at least $37 million on undisclosed delinquent loans. JP Morgan was also charged with Bear Stearns' failure to disclose its practice of obtaining and keeping cash settlements from loan originators on problem loans. JP Morgan agreed to pay $296.9 million to settle the charges. Credit Suisse was charged with failing to accurately disclose its practice of retaining cash settlements from claims again mortgage loan originators, and with making misstatements in SEC filings about when it would repurchase mortgage loans from trusts if borrowers missed the first payment. Credit Suisse agreed to pay $120 million to settle the charges. The SEC filed these cases in its capacity as a member of the Residential Mortgage-Backed Securities Working Group of President Obama's Financial Fraud Enforcement Task Force.
- In November 2012, the SEC charged Stamford, Connecticut-based hedge fund advisory firm CR Intrinsic Investors LLC, its former portfolio manager, and a medical consultant for an expert network firm for their roles in an insider trading scheme involving the clinical trial of a drug to treat Alzheimer's. The scheme allegedly generated $276 million in illicit gains, making it the largest insider trading case ever charged by the SEC.
- In November 2012, the SEC charged Massachusetts Mutual Life Insurance Company for failing to disclose the potential negative impact of a "cap" it had placed on a complex investment product. The cap, which potentially affected $2.5 billion worth of variable annuities, would cause the guaranteed minimum income benefit (GMIB) value to stop earning interest when reached.
- Also in November 2012, the SEC brought charges against BP p.l.c for misleading investors about the amount of oil that leaked into the Gulf of Mexico following the Deepwater Horizon oil rig explosion on April 20, 2010. The SEC alleges that BP repeatedly and significantly understated the amount of oil leaking from the rig by making fraudulent public statements and disclosures estimating that 5,000 barrels of oil a day flowed from the leak despite internal data showing that the flow rate could be as high as 146,000 barrels a day. Even after a government task force determined the flow rate estimate was actually more than 10 times higher than BP's estimate, BP did not correct or update the misrepresentations and omissions it made in SEC filings for investors. BP agreed to settle the SEC's charges by paying a $525 million penalty, the third-largest penalty in agency history.
