= HM Capital Partners =

US private equity firm

HM Capital Partners LLC
- Formerly: Hicks & Haas (1984-89); Hicks, Muse & Co. (1989-94); Hicks Muse Tate & Furst (1994-2006)
- Type: Limited liability company
- Industry: Private equity
- Founded: 1984
- Founders: Tom Hicks; Robert Haas; John Muse; Charles Tate; Jack Furst
- Defunct: 2013
- Fate: Dissolved
- Headquarters: Dallas, Texas, United States
- Products: Leveraged buyouts, Growth capital
- Website: hmcapital.com

HM Capital Partners was a private equity firm in the United States that specialized in leveraged buyouts. The firm was previously known as Hicks, Muse, Tate & Furst. It was founded in 1989 by Tom Hicks and John Muse as Hicks, Muse & Co. and was changed in 1994 to reflect the roles of Charles Tate and Jack Furst.

== History ==
=== Hicks & Haas ===
The son of a Texas radio station owner, Tom Hicks became interested in leveraged buyouts as a member of First National Bank's venture capital group. Hicks and Robert Haas formed Hicks & Haas in 1984; the next year that firm bought Hicks Communications, a radio outfit run by Hicks' brother Steven. (This would be the first of several media companies bought or created by the buyout firm that involved Steven Hicks.)

Hicks & Haas' biggest coup was its mid-1980s acquisition of several soft drink makers, including Dr Pepper and 7 Up. The firm took Dr Pepper/7 Up public just 18 months after merging the two companies. In all, Hicks & Haas turned an $88 million investment funding into $1.3 billion. The pair split up in 1989; Hicks wanted to raise a large pool to invest, but Haas preferred to work deal by deal. Robert Haas went on to form Haas Wheat & Partners a middle market private equity firm based in Dallas.

=== Hicks, Muse, Tate & Furst (HMTF) ===
Hicks, Muse, Tate & Furst logo prior to the change of the firm's name in 2006

Hicks raised $250 million in 1989 and teamed with former Prudential Securities banker John Muse to form Hicks Muse. Early investments included Life Partners Group (life insurance, 1990; sold 1996). In 1991 Morgan Stanley's Charles Tate and First Boston's Jack Furst became partners.

As part of its buy-and-build strategy, Hicks Muse bought DuPont's connector systems unit in 1993, renamed it Berg Electronics, added six more companies to it, and doubled its earnings before selling it in 1998. Not every acquisition was successful for Hicks Muse. Less-than-successful purchases included bankrupt brewer G. Heileman Brewing Company of La Crosse, Wisconsin, bought in 1994 and sold two years later for an almost $100 million loss.

The buyout firm's Chancellor Media radio company went public in 1996. That year Hicks Muse gained entry into Latin America with its purchases of cash-starved Mexican companies, including Seguros Commercial America, one of the country's largest insurers. That year it also brought International Home Foods (Jiffy Pop, Chef Boyardee) into the Hicks Muse fold.

In 1997 Chancellor and Evergreen Media merged to form Chancellor Media (renamed AMFM in 1999). The next year Hicks Muse continued buying US and Latin American media companies, as well as a few oddities (a UK software maker, a Danish seed company, and US direct-seller Home Interiors and Gifts). Hicks Muse and Kohlberg Kravis Roberts merged their cinema operations to form the US's largest theater chain, Regal Cinemas. Regal filed for bankruptcy protection in 2001. The company that year also moved into the depressed energy field (Triton Energy) and formed a $1.5 billion European fund. They also invested $400 million into Teligent, Inc., a fixed wireless telecommunications carrier. Teligent filed for bankruptcy in 2001 and is now defunct.

Acquisitions in 1999 included UK food group Hillsdown Holdings, one-third of Mexican flour maker Grupo Minsa, and (just in time for millennial celebrations) popular champagne brands Mumm and Perrier-Jouët (it quadrupled its investment when it sold the champagne houses in late 2000). Lured by low stock prices on real estate investment trusts (REITs), the company agreed to buy Walden (formerly Walden Residential Properties) that year.

Hicks Muse, along with UK-based Apax Partners, bought British Telecom's yellow page directory business Yell Group for roughly $3.5 billion, making it the largest non-corporate LBO in European history. Yell subsequently acquired US directories publisher McLeodUSA for about $600 million, and floated in 2003.

Hicks Muse acquired Nestlé's Ambient Food Business in 2002, which added well-known UK brands Crosse & Blackwell, Branston Pickle, Chivers (marmalade), Sun-Pat (peanut butter), Gale's (honey), Sarson's (vinegar) and Rowntree's (jelly) to the Premier Foods stable. Cereal maker Weetabix Limited and Unilever's cast-offs Ambrosia (creamed rice and puddings) and Brown & Polson, rounded out Premier Foods' portfolio in 2003.

Acquisitions in 2004 included Kerns Oil & Gas (renamed Blackbrush Energy -- natural gas production), Persona (Canadian cable television company), Regency Gas Services (gas processing and distribution), and Centennial Puerto Rico Cable TV (Puerto Rican cable television company). It also agreed to buy a majority stake in trendy luxury shoemaker Jimmy Choo. Disposals during the year included the company's remaining stake in Yell and its stake in Premier Foods.

In May 2005, Sturm Foods was acquired by HM Capital Partners. Located in Manawa, Wisconsin, Sturm Foods specializes in the manufacturing of bulk goods such as oatmeal and markets several sugar-free products under private labels.

=== HM Capital and Successors ===
Hicks Muse struggled in the years immediately following the bursting of the internet and telecom bubbles was often cited with Forstmann Little as the highest profile private equity casualties, having invested heavily in technology and telecommunications companies. The firm's reputation and market position were both damaged by the loss of over $1 billion from minority investments in six telecommunications and 13 Internet companies at the peak of the 1990s stock market bubble as well as several traditional buyouts that ended in bankruptcy (e.g., Regal Cinemas, Viasystems Group, International Wire.

Tom Hicks resigned from Hicks Muse at the end of 2004 and was replaced at the helm by co-founder John Muse. Hicks would go on to found Hicks Holdings LLC. Charles Tate resigned from Hicks Muse in 2002.

In January 2005, the company's European arm, separated from Hicks Muse to form Lion Capital LLP, which has since raised over $4 billion across two private equity funds.

In March 2006, Hicks Muse Tate & Furst changed its name to HM Capital reflecting the departure of Tom Hicks and the new group of partners heading the firm. HM Capital appears to be overcoming initial obstacles, raising new capital from institutional investors for a $1 billion private equity fund, its first in more than five years.

In 2013, HM Capital began dissolving. The energy group spun out as Tailwater Capital and the food group spun off as Kainos Capital.
