= Filippo Gragnani =

Italian guitarist and composer

Filippo Gragnani (3 September 1768 – 28 July 1820) was an Italian guitarist and composer.

Gragnani was born in Livorno, the son of Antonio Gragnani. From a family of notable luthiers and musicians, Gragnani studied music in his home town with Giulio Maria Lucchesi. He began with the violin but later devoted himself to the guitar, becoming known as a virtuoso performer.

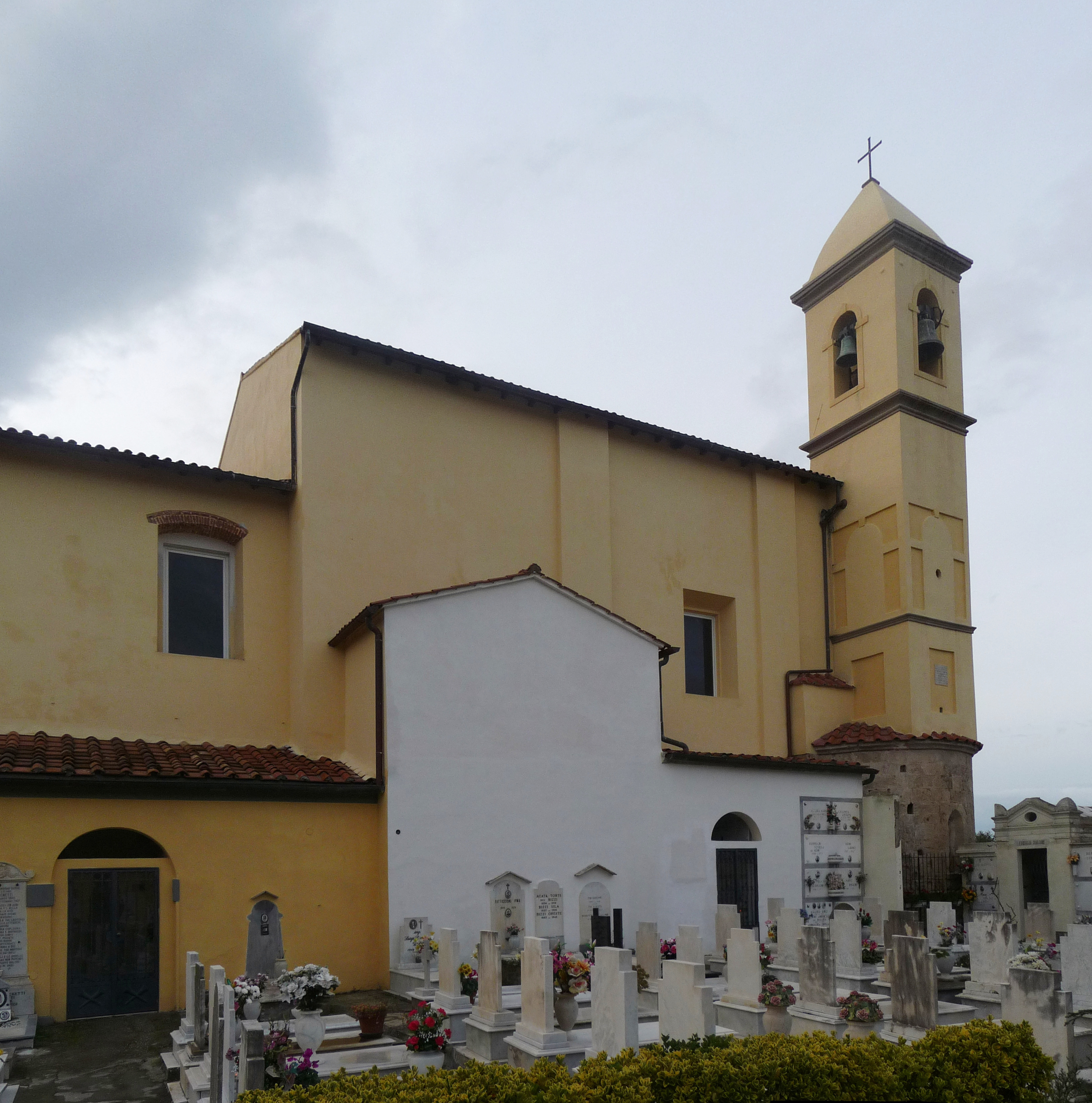
According to church records, Filippo Gragnani is buried at the Church of St. Martino di Salviano.

Gragnani first published works for guitar and chamber music in Milan around the beginning of the 19th century with the publishers Ricordi and Monzino. During these times, he travelled to Germany and settled in Paris by 1810, a center of performance and music publishing. There, he befriended and became a pupil of Ferdinando Carulli, another Italian virtuoso. Gragnani dedicated three of his guitar duets to him, and in turn Carulli dedicated some duets to Gragnani.

Little is known about Gragnani after 1812. The "Registro dei Morti" (Register of Deaths) of the Church of St. Martino di Salviano in Livorno indicates he died on 28 July 1820.

== Works ==
Some twenty compositions are known by Gragnani, of which fifteen have opus numbers.

- Tre Sonate
- Tre Duetti
- Sinfonia
- Sonata Sentimentale
- Tre Divertimenti
- Tre Duetti
- Trois Duos, Op. 1
- Trois Duos, Op. 2
- Trois Duos, Op. 3
- Trois Duos, Op. 4
- Fantasia (solo guitar), Op. 5
- Opus 6
  - Tre Sonatine e un Tema con Variazioni, Op. 6
  - Trois Duos, Op. 6
- Trois Duos, Op. 7
- Opus 8
  - Tre Dui (for violin and guitar), Op. 8
  - Quartetto for clarinet, violin, and two guitars, Op. 8
- Sestetto (for flute, clarinet, violin, 2 guitars & cello in A major), Op. 9
- Variazioni, Op. 10
- Trois Exercices, Op. 11
- Trio (for three guitars), Op. 12
- Trio (for flute, violin and guitar), Op. 13
- Trois Duos, Op. 14
- Opus 15
  - Sonata Sentimentale (solo guitar), Op. 15
  - Divertimenti (solo guitar), Op. 15

== Sheet Music ==
- Rischel & Birket-Smith's Collection of guitar music Det Kongelige Bibliotek, Denmark
- "Fantasia" Opus 5 at the Boije Collection, STATENS MUSIKBIBLIOTEK - The Music Library of Sweden
- Free scores by Filippo Gragnani at the International Music Score Library Project (IMSLP)
