= Josephine Lucchese =

American opera soprano (1893–1974)

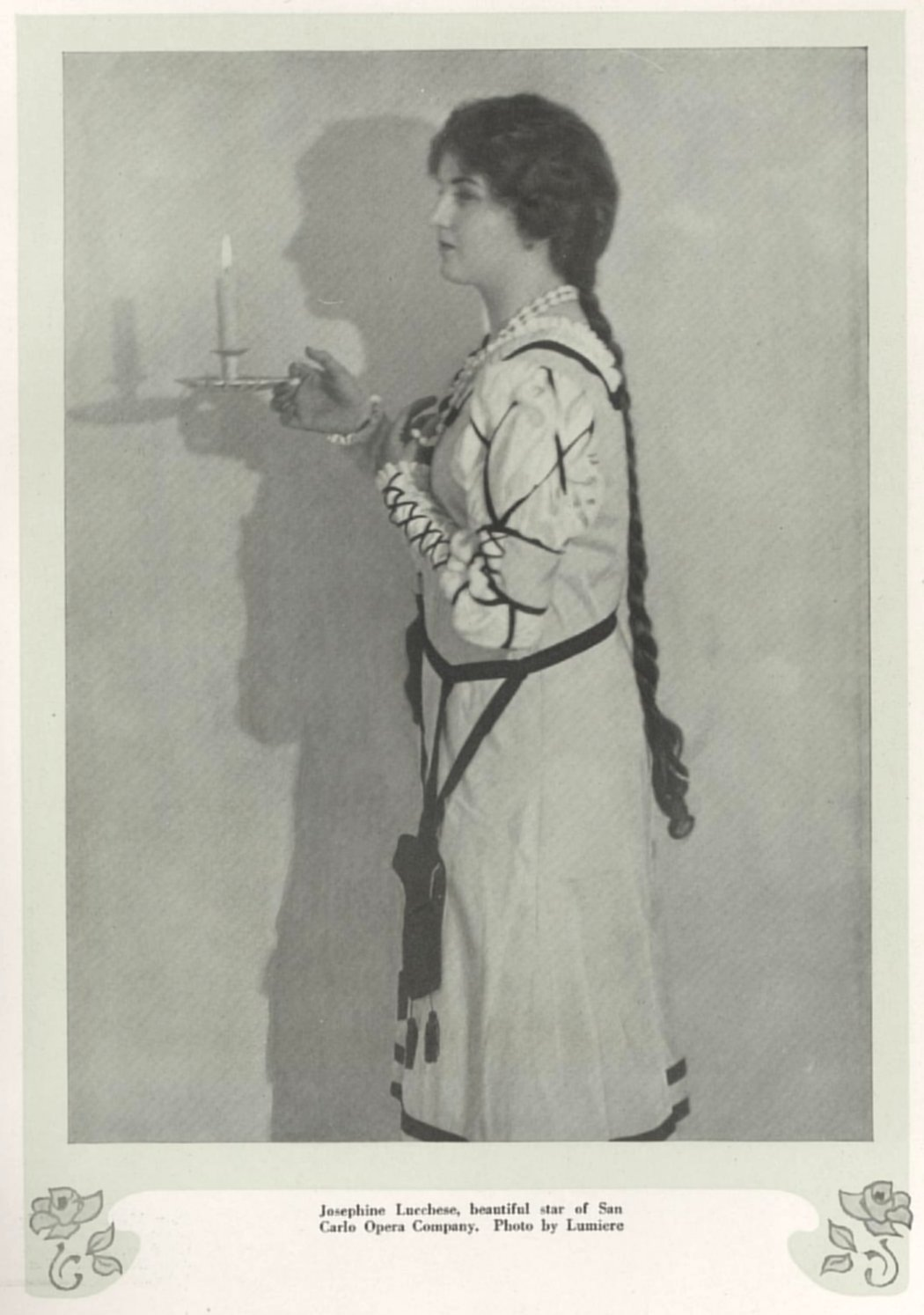
- Lucchese as Gilda in Rigoletto in 1922
- Born: July 24, 1893; San Antonio, Texas
- Died: September 10, 1974 (aged 81); San Antonio, Texas
- Resting place: Saint Mary's Cemetery
- Education: Main Avenue High School
- Occupation: Opera singer
- Spouses: Adolfo Caruso; Florentine Donato
- Parents: Sam Lucchese; Frances Battaglia

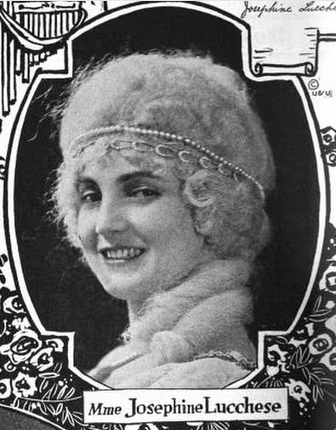
Josephine Lucchese, from a 1922 publication

Josephine Lucchese (July 24, 1893 – September 10, 1974) was an American operatic soprano who had an active international singing career during the 1920s and 1930s. A skilled coloratura soprano, she was particularly admired for her portrayals of Rosina in The Barber of Seville, Violetta in La traviata, and the title role in Lucia di Lammermoor. She began her opera career in 1920 with the San Carlo Opera Company; a touring opera company in the United States. She was a resident artist with the Philadelphia Grand Opera Company from 1929 to 1932, and was a principal artist with the Dutch National Opera during the 1930s. She also appeared as a guest artist with American and European opera houses during her career.

== Early life ==
Josephine Lucchese was born on July 24, 1893, in San Antonio, Texas. Her father, Sam Lucchese, was an Italian-born immigrant who founded the Lucchese Boot Company. In her youth she learned how to play the mandolin and the piano, and studied singing with Virginia Colombati. She was educated at the Main Avenue High School in San Antonio.

== Career ==
At the age of 18, Lucchese traveled with Colombati to New York City to pursue further studies in music with Yeatman Griffith. She made her professional singing debut soon after at Aeolian Hall in Manhattan on November 26, 1919, giving a recital of art songs and arias, including pieces from The Magic Flute, La sonnambula and Félicien David's La perle du Brésil. A year later, on September 22, 1920, she made her professional opera debut as Olympia in Jacques Offenbach's The Tales of Hoffmann with Fortune Gallo's touring San Carlo Opera Company at the Manhattan Opera House. She remained under contract with that company for the next five years; performing across the United States and Canada in such roles as Gilda in Rigoletto, Lady Harriet Durham in Martha, Micaëla in Carmen, Rosina in The Barber of Seville, Violetta in La traviata, and the title role in Lucia di Lammermoor.

In 1925 Lucchese performed Violetta to Dimitrie Onofrei's Alfredo at the Academy of Music in the first performance of the Philadelphia La Scala Opera Company. In 1926 she made her debut with the Philadelphia Grand Opera Company (PGOC) as Gilda to Millo Picco's Rigoletto. She later became a resident artist with the PGOC from 1929 until the company's bankruptcy in 1932, performing such roles as Konstanze in The Abduction from the Seraglio, Leïla in Les pêcheurs de perles, Rosina, Violetta, and the title role in Lakmé among others. In 1933 she appeared in concert performances of Rigoletto and La traviata with the Philadelphia Orchestra before once again becoming a member of the San Carlo Opera Company. In 1939 she was a principal artist with Vito Parisi's Imperial Grand Opera Company.

Lucchese gave her first performance outside of the United States at the National Theatre of Cuba in Havana, Cuba as Ophelia in Ambroise Thomas's Hamlet in 1923. She sang in another Thomas opera for her first performances in Europe; appearing as Philine in Mignon in a tour of German cities in 1927–1928. During the 1930s she was a resident artist with the Dutch National Opera and appeared as a guest artist at several opera houses in the Netherlands. She also appeared in opera houses in Berlin, Hamburg, and Prague. She became known as 'The American Nightingale' in Europe.

Lucchese appeared as a guest artist in opera performances in several American cities during her career, including appearances at the Detroit Opera House and the Cincinnati Opera. Other roles she performed on stage during her career include Norina in Don Pasquale and Mimì in Puccini's La bohème. Her notable stage partners included Tito Schipa and Giovanni Martinelli. She also sang in concerts with the Minneapolis Symphony Orchestra.

From 1956 to 1971, Lucchese taught singing at the University of Texas. One of her notable pupils was tenor Bruce Brewer.

== Personal life ==
Lucchese was married twice: first to Adolfo Caruso, followed by Florentine Donato.

== Death ==
She died on September 10, 1974, in her home town of San Antonio, Texas.
