= Lucchesi Park =

Park in Petaluma, California

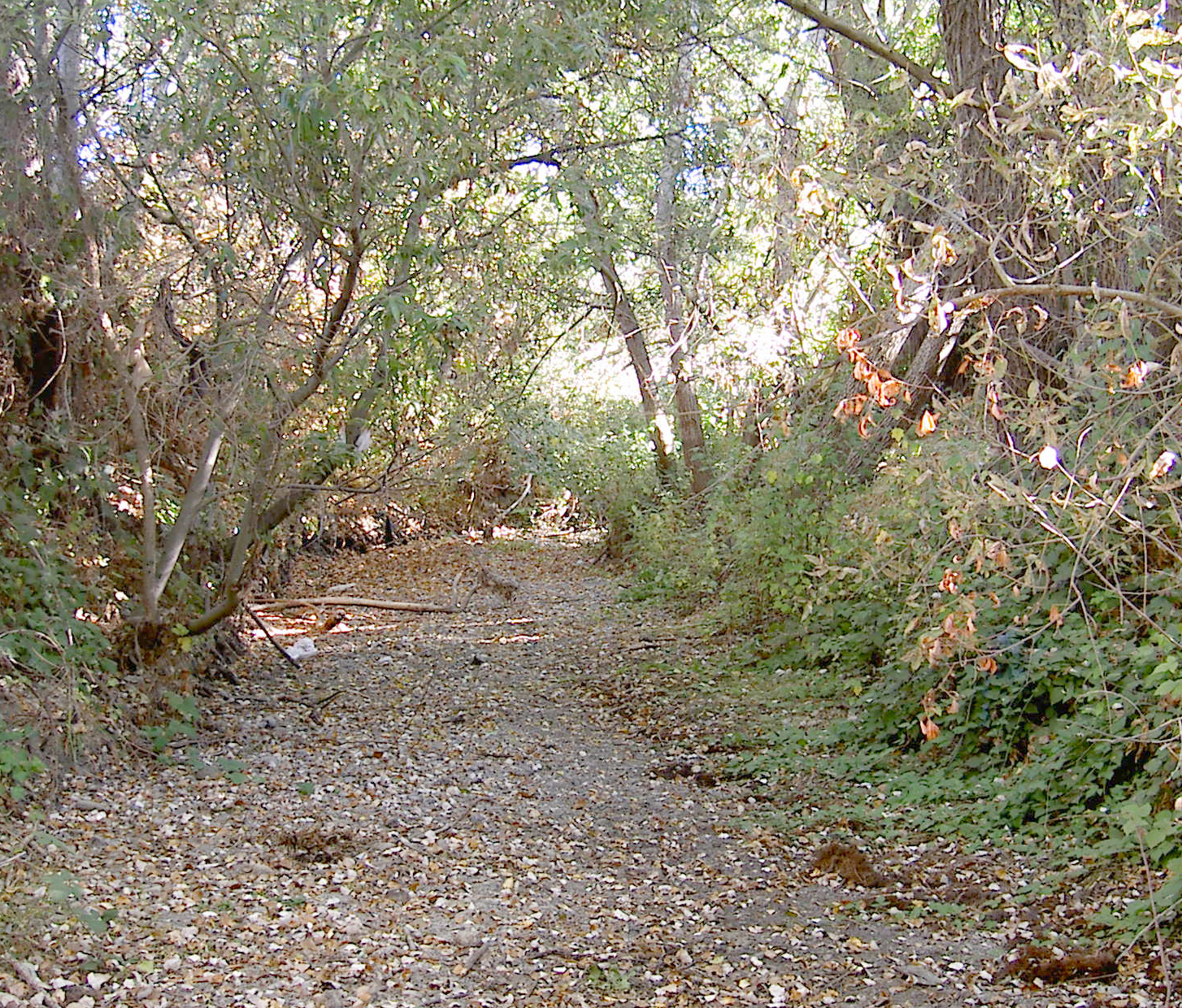
- Interactive map of Lucchesi Park
- Location: Petaluma, California
- Coordinates: 38.3°N 122.6°W
- Area: 29.83 acres (12.07 ha)
- Operator: City of Petaluma
- Open: Yes
- Status: Public
- Website: https://cityofpetaluma.org/lucchesi-park/

Lucchesi Park is a public park located in Petaluma, California. It is maintained by the City of Petaluma and features activities for families. These activities include two playgrounds, a pond, picnic tables, BBQ area, tennis, pickleball and handball, synthetic turf field, two baseball complexes, and walking paths. The Petaluma Community and Senior Centers are both within the park. The park is also a bird watching spot, due to the lake and woods nearby. One can often see Mallards, Ring-billed gulls, Brewer's blackbird, the bushtit, and the Golden-crowned sparrow, just to name a few. The park was named after Mario "Moch" Lucchesi.
