= Life Partnership Act =

The Life Partnership Act may refer to several legislations that legalized same-sex unions:

- Life Partnership Act (Croatia), 2014
- Life Partnership Act (Germany), 2001
