= Sam Lucchese =

Businessman and impresario (1868–1929)

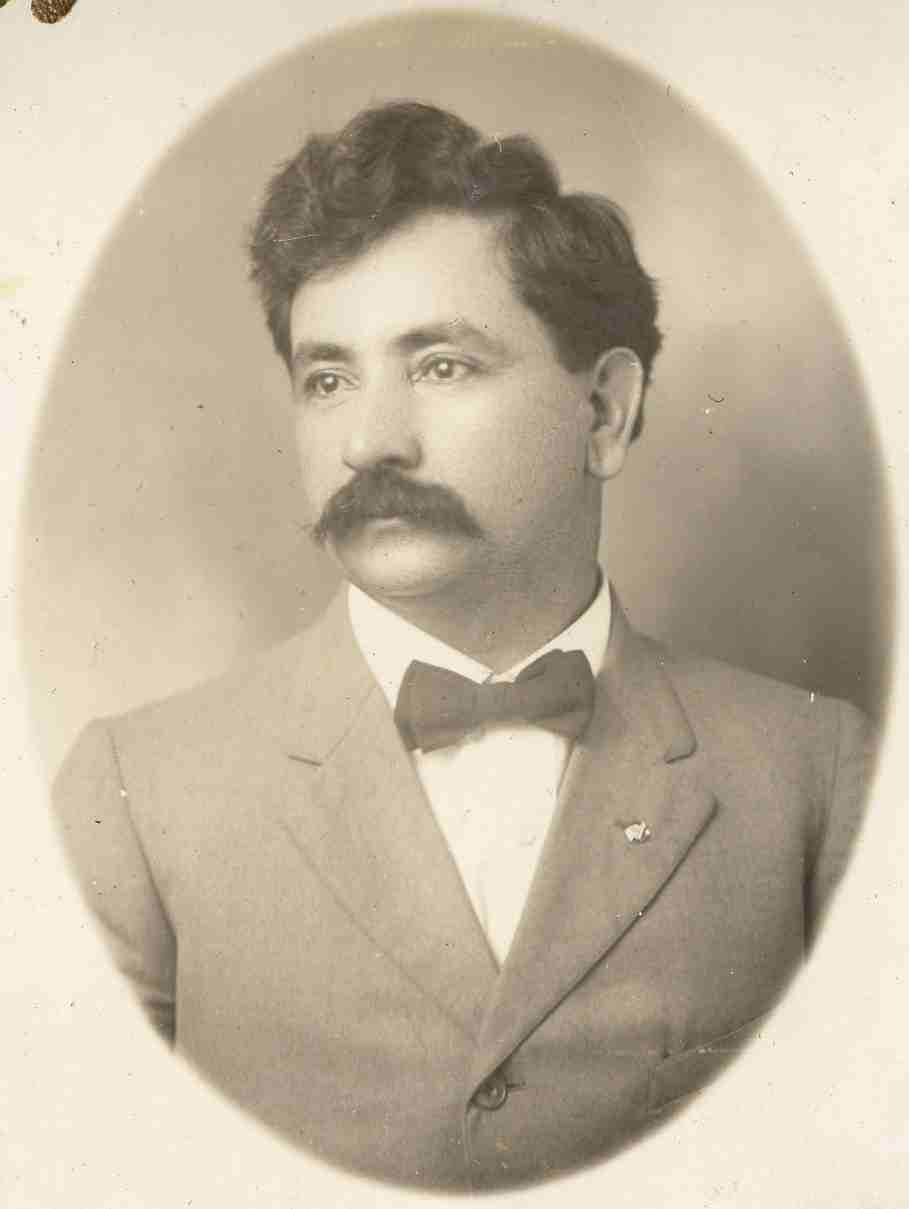
- Born: February 24, 1868; Palermo, Sicily, Kingdom of Italy
- Died: January 15, 1929 (aged 60); San Antonio, Texas, US
- Resting place: Saint Mary's Cemetery
- Occupations: Businessman; impresario
- Spouse: Frances Battaglia
- Children: 5, including Josephine

Sam Lucchese (February 24, 1868 – January 15, 1929) was an Italian-born American businessman and impresario. He was the founder of the Lucchese Boot Company and the owner of Spanish-language theaters in San Antonio and Laredo, Texas.

== Early life ==
Sam Lucchese was born on February 24, 1868, in Palermo, Sicily, Italy. He immigrated to the United States in 1883 with his parents and siblings, settling in San Antonio, Texas.

== Career ==
Lucchese was a businessman. In 1883, he co-founded the Lucchese Boot Company with his brother in San Antonio.

With the revenue from his boot company, Lucchese opened Spanish-language theaters in San Antonio and Laredo. In 1912, he acquired the Teatro Zaragoza on the corner of Commerce Street and Santa Rosa Street in San Antonio. Five years later, in 1917, he acquired the Teatro Nacional, located at the same intersection in San Antonio. An impresario, he hired actors from Mexico to perform in his theaters.

== Personal life ==
He married Frances Battaglia. They had three sons and two daughters. Their son Gaetano "Tano" Lucchese ran the family's Spanish-language theaters, expanding the collection in San Antonio to include the Alameda Theater and Casa de Mexico International Building. Daughter Josephine Lucchese became a renowned opera vocalist and performed at the opening night of the Alameda Theater.

== Death and legacy ==
He died of a stroke on January 15, 1929, in San Antonio, Texas. He was buried at Saint Mary's Cemetery. After his death, his son Cosimo took over the Lucchese Boot Company. His grandson, Samuel James Lucchese, succeeded him, and designed boots for many actors.
