= Texas Public Radio =

Public radio network in south-central Texas

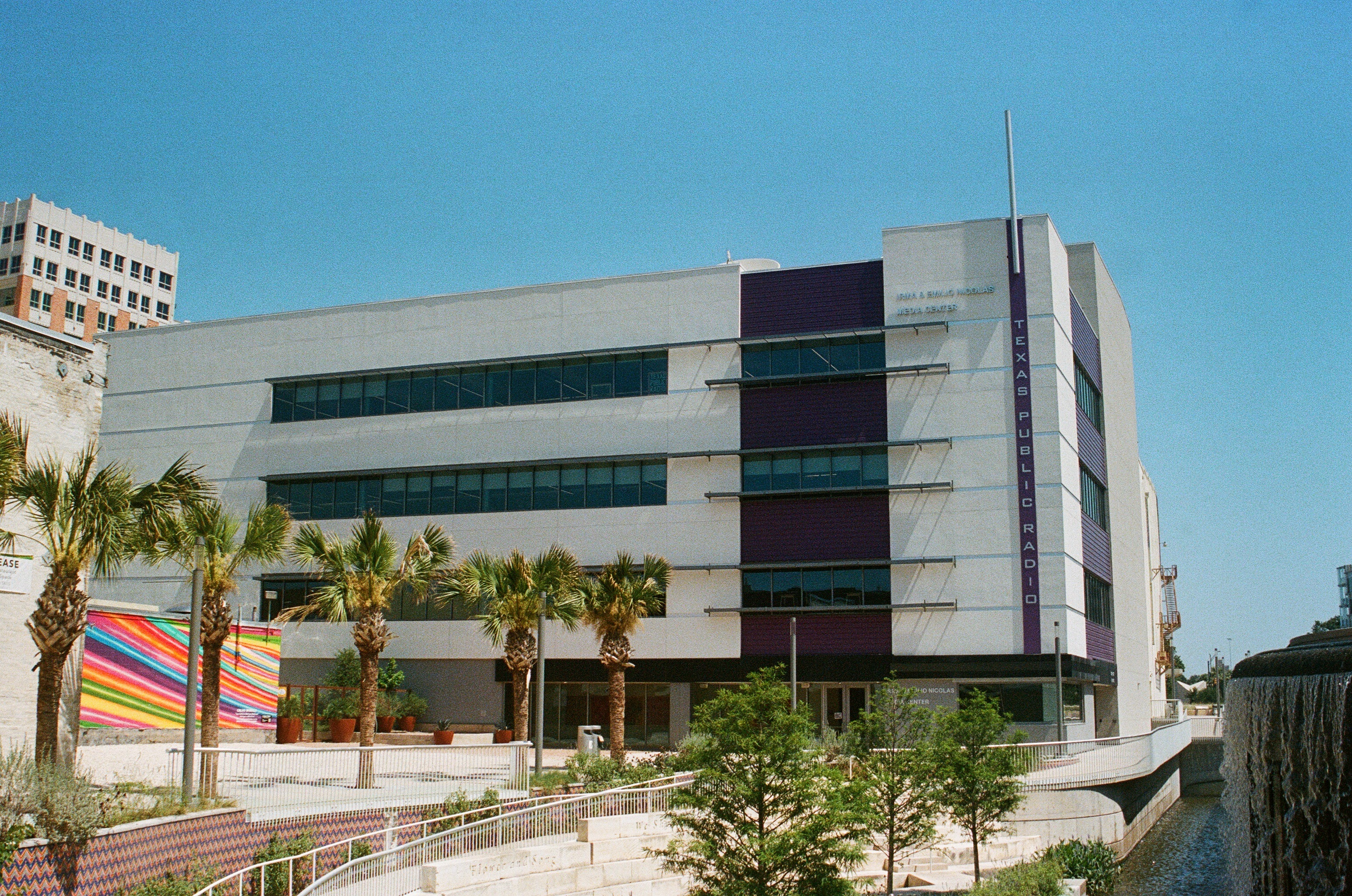
- Texas Public Radio is housed at the Irma & Emilio Nicolas Media Center in Downtown San Antonio.
- Trade name: Texas Public Radio
- Industry: Mass media
- Genre: Public radio
- Founded: November 7, 1982; 43 years ago as KPAC
- Founder: Wilford Stapp
- Headquarters: San Antonio, United States
- Revenue: 6,350,039 United States dollar (2022)
- Total assets: 12,996,965 United States dollar (2022)
- Website: tpr.org

Texas Public Radio (TPR) is a public radio broadcaster based in San Antonio, Texas, United States, providing NPR and other public radio programming to south-central and West Texas, including San Antonio, the Texas Hill Country, and the Big Spring area. In San Antonio, TPR broadcasts two program services: classical music on KPAC (88.3 FM) and NPR talk and information on KSTX (89.1 FM); most of the other stations are satellites of KSTX. TPR is funded by listener and donor support. Its studios are located in the Irma & Emilio Nicolas Media Center on West Commerce Street in downtown San Antonio.

KPAC began broadcasting on November 7, 1982, as a non-commercial, all-classical music station under the aegis of the Classical Broadcasting Society of San Antonio. Its founder, arts patron Wilford Stapp, sought to fill the void created when classical music slowly disappeared from San Antonio commercial station KMFM. Meanwhile, attempts to bring a public radio station to San Antonio dated to the early 1970s. The construction permit for what became KSTX was issued in 1979, but construction was stymied by internal issues and difficulty receiving public support. Ultimately, the permitholders and KPAC agreed to merge, enabling KSTX to begin broadcasting NPR to San Antonio in 1988. The other stations in the TPR network were built or acquired between 1997 and 2017.

== History ==
=== KPAC: Filling the classical void ===
Beginning in 1964, KMFM 96.1, founded by oil baron Harry Pennington, had served as a commercial classical music station in the San Antonio area. After Pennington's death in 1975, his widow sold the station, which began to change to a more commercially lucrative format. Sensing that the sale would lead to the end of classical music on KMFM, supporters of classical music began planning for a new, non-commercial station to serve as its eventual replacement. In 1977, the Classical Broadcasting Society of San Antonio was chartered. It took years to identify an available frequency for non-commercial use in San Antonio—90.9 MHz, at the time allocated to Seguin—and have the Federal Communications Commission (FCC) and Mexican authorities agree to move it to San Antonio.

From a transmitter atop a ten-story office building on Nine Mile Hill, KPAC began broadcasting on November 7, 1982. It got on the air with donated equipment—including a transmitter from KMFM and the station's collection of classical records—and had 2,000 members by August 1983. Nearly from its start, it operated at a surplus, unusual for a listener-supported radio station.

=== KSTX: NPR comes to San Antonio ===
Efforts to get a public radio station for San Antonio stretched as far back as 1974. On January 21 of that year, the San Antonio Community Radio Corporation, headed by Pleas J. McNeel, filed an application with the FCC for a station on 89.1 MHz. A competing application was received soon after from the Southwest Texas Public Broadcasting Council, the Austin-based owner of KLRN (channel 9). Though that group withdrew its application three months later, a competing applicant again arose in October 1975: Yanaguana Radio Station, headed by Carlos Garcia. Though Yanaguana announced two months later it was joining forces with the San Antonio Community Radio bid, a formal settlement agreement between the parties was not filed with the FCC until August 1978, and the construction permit was granted October 23, 1979.

San Antonio Community Radio Corporation then won grants from the Corporation for Public Broadcasting (CPB) and the National Telecommunications and Information Administration and began the process of seeking a studio and transmitter site. A general manager was hired in May 1980 with the intention of starting operations by the end of 1981. A broadly defined bilingual format was selected. After the call sign KAZZ was denied by the FCC at the petition of FM station KZZY, the station took the call sign KURU in January 1981. It secured studio space in a building owned by the San Antonio Museum Association on Jones Avenue.

The museum space deal, like virtually all the effort expended at this stage into putting KURU together, never went anywhere. The cobbled-together leadership had competing priorities for programming. Transmitter site negotiations failed; the heavy antenna needed for broadcasting a Class C, 100,000-watt signal limited options, and the Tower of the Americas was already full, forcing the station to contemplate building its own tower and finding a site in rapidly growing San Antonio. KURU managed to secure receiver equipment and lost it to the museum association in a payment dispute. In late 1983, the board ceased fundraising operations. Former board chair Frances Hill told the San Antonio Express-News that fundraising failed to occur "because the board got involved in personalities and other things instead of doing the job it was supposed to do".

In March 1984, San Antonio Community Radio experienced turnover on its board as San Francisco–based Western Community Bilingual Inc. (WCB) obtained control, filling 11 of the board's 21 seats. That September, the push to bring NPR to San Antonio was relaunched, with a new call sign, KSTX (for San Antonio, Texas), and a new board chair: Mary Alice Cisneros, wife of San Antonio mayor Henry Cisneros. As in the KURU era, the proposed KSTX would be a bilingual station. This effort, too, stalled out amid a mix of technical and economic struggles. A San Antonio TV station objected to the proposed technical facility, a deal for tower space was scuttled by the sale of the station that owned the tower, and a deal the station had for space in a new San Antonio skyscraper fell apart when the building's owner went bankrupt. Funds that had been raised were diverted to paying for lawyers and engineers, all as a new round of grants and the construction permit were set to expire, and San Antonio remained the largest city in the nation without NPR.

=== Texas Public Radio: Two stations for San Antonio ===
The complications that had emerged in putting KSTX on the air attracted the attention of leadership at KPAC. Henry Muñoz III, the incoming president of the KPAC governing board, had heard of the problems snarling the second station effort and made a merger proposal to KSTX's board. KPAC applied for and won a grant from the CPB, which they unexpectedly received. Heading off concerns about keeping KPAC a classical station, the organizations merged and, with FCC approval, were able to own two non-commercial stations in the same area. To manage the combined operation, KPAC and KSTX hired Joe Gwathmey, a Brownwood native who had spent 16 years working at NPR in Washington, D.C., but prior to that worked at KUT in Austin. KSTX met a construction deadline and began broadcasting a test signal on July 29, 1988: it simulcast KPAC from midnight to 5 a.m. and then aired Morning Edition before going off the air again. KSTX began full program service on October 3, 1988. From the start, it was primarily a news and information station with weekend music programming.

In 1991, Texas Public Radio obtained a construction permit for a new facility for KPAC, broadcasting with 100,000 watts instead of 3,000 at 88.3 MHz. The new facility was activated on March 16, 1992. The 90.9 facility was sold for $75,000 to the Bible Broadcasting Network and became BBN station KYFS on April 8, 1992.

=== Expansion beyond San Antonio ===
Some areas of the Hill Country could not get a clear signal from KSTX or any NPR news and information station. In 1997, Hill Country Friends of Texas Public Radio was formed to support the expansion of TPR to the area. KTXI began broadcasting on October 8, 1998, airing a mix of NPR news from KSTX and classical music from KPAC. Its signal covers Fredericksburg, Kerrville, and other portions of the central Hill Country. TPR made two other expansion attempts that failed to pan out. In 2009, a group in the Rio Grande Valley that would have partnered with TPR was unable to obtain a station to start broadcasting there. Two years later, TPR's bid to buy KOCV-FM in Odessa from Odessa College was bypassed in favor of an offer from Marfa Public Radio.

KTPR was launched on January 20, 2013, and in October 2013, KVHL began broadcasting to the Highland Lakes area of Texas. KTPD began broadcasting to Del Rio on May 5, 2016, and TPR began airing its programming on KCTI (1450 AM) in Gonzales on September 28, 2016. KTPR was upgraded in 2020 to increase coverage in the Permian Basin.

=== Alameda Theater relocation ===
Joyce Slocum, a former NPR administrator, became the third leader in the history of Texas Public Radio in January 2014.

In 2016, TPR became part of the restoration project for San Antonio's historic Alameda Theater, a one-time Mexican-American movie house and entertainment venue, by agreeing to build a new headquarters behind it. The station had been headquartered in a building on Datapoint Drive. The facilities were named for Emilio Nicolas, founder of KWEX-TV and what became Univision, and his wife Irma after Emilio's son Guillermo made a gift to TPR. TPR made the move to the new site in February 2020.

After a decade leading TPR, Slocum died in March 2024 of complications from colon cancer. Less than a month after the naming of her replacement, Ashley Alvarado, TPR employees announced their intention to unionize with SAG-AFTRA. In 2026, Texas Public Radio combined operations with the digital news site San Antonio Report.

== Funding ==
In fiscal year 2024, TPR had total revenues of $6.947 million. The Corporation for Public Broadcasting provided a $453,000 Community Service Grant to the station. The organization had 9,858 members, who donated $2.667 million, and received $1.341 million in gifts and bequests from 555 major individual donors.

== Programming ==
KSTX and other stations carrying the news-talk-information format run several national programs on weekdays, including Morning Edition, All Things Considered, Fresh Air, Here and Now, and Marketplace. TPR also co-produces and airs the regional program Texas Standard, originating in Austin alongside KUT in Austin, KERA in Dallas, and Houston Public Media. TPR produces its own daily one-hour interview and call-in show, The Source, hosted by David Martin Davies. The BBC World Service runs overnight. On weekends, the station airs a range of specialty talk shows.

KPAC airs classical music, primarily from American Public Media's Classical 24 service, as well as a local afternoon show, Classical Connection, and specialty programs. KPAC has used Classical 24 since 2013, when it dismissed its five local weekday and weekend hosts to save money and bolster the more popular KSTX.

== Transmitters ==
Transmitters for TPR News
Call sign	Frequency	City of license	FID	Power (W)	ERP (W)	HAAT	Class	First air date	Transmitter coordinates	FCC info
KCTI	1450 AM	Gonzales, TX	24564	1,000	—	—	C	December 17, 1947	29°30′36″N 97°24′50.40″W	Public file LMS
KSTX	89.1 FM	San Antonio, TX	65334	—	72,000	240 m (790 ft)	C1	October 3, 1988	29°31′25.8″N 98°43′26.1″W	Public file LMS
KTPD	89.3 FM	Del Rio, TX	173346	—	25,000	83 m (272 ft)	C3	May 5, 2016	29°24′21.8″N 100°39′42.3″W	Public file LMS
KTPR	89.9 FM	Stanton, TX	172898	—	100,000	200 m (660 ft)	C1	December 3, 2012	32°10′58.8″N 101°27′55.8″W	Public file LMS
KVHL	91.7 FM	Llano, TX	173366	—	1,500	153 m (502 ft)	A	October 2013	30°40′36.6″N 98°34′0.1″W	Public file LMS

Transmitter for TPR Music
Call sign	Frequency	City of license	FID	ERP (W)	HAAT	Class	First air date	Transmitter coordinates	FCC info
KPAC	88.3 FM	San Antonio, TX	65335	69,000	138 m (453 ft)	C1	November 7, 1982	29°31′25.8″N 98°43′26.1″W	Public file LMS

Transmitter for TPR News and Music
Call sign	Frequency	City of license	FID	ERP (W)	HAAT	Class	First air date	Transmitter coordinates	FCC info
KTXI	90.1 FM	Ingram, TX	77699	50,000	240 m (790 ft)	C2	October 8, 1998	30°6′14.8″N 99°4′37.1″W	Public file LMS

Grade A signal contours for Texas Public Radio.; Main TPR service (KCTI and K223CZ, KSTX, KTPD, KTPR, KVHL); TPR Music (KPAC); TPR News and Music (KTXI)
