= Giulio Maria Lucchesi =

Italian violinist and composer

Giulio Maria Lucchesi (died after 1799) was an 18th-century Italian violinist and composer. He was born in Pisa, Italy, but was also active under the archbishop in Salzburg, Austria. He returned to Italy in 1799. Among his masters were Moriano, later Pietro Nardini. He helped train Filippo Gragnani. He left several pieces of vocal and instrumental music.
