= Lucchese Boot Company =

American manufacturer of cowboy boots

Lucchese Bootmaker
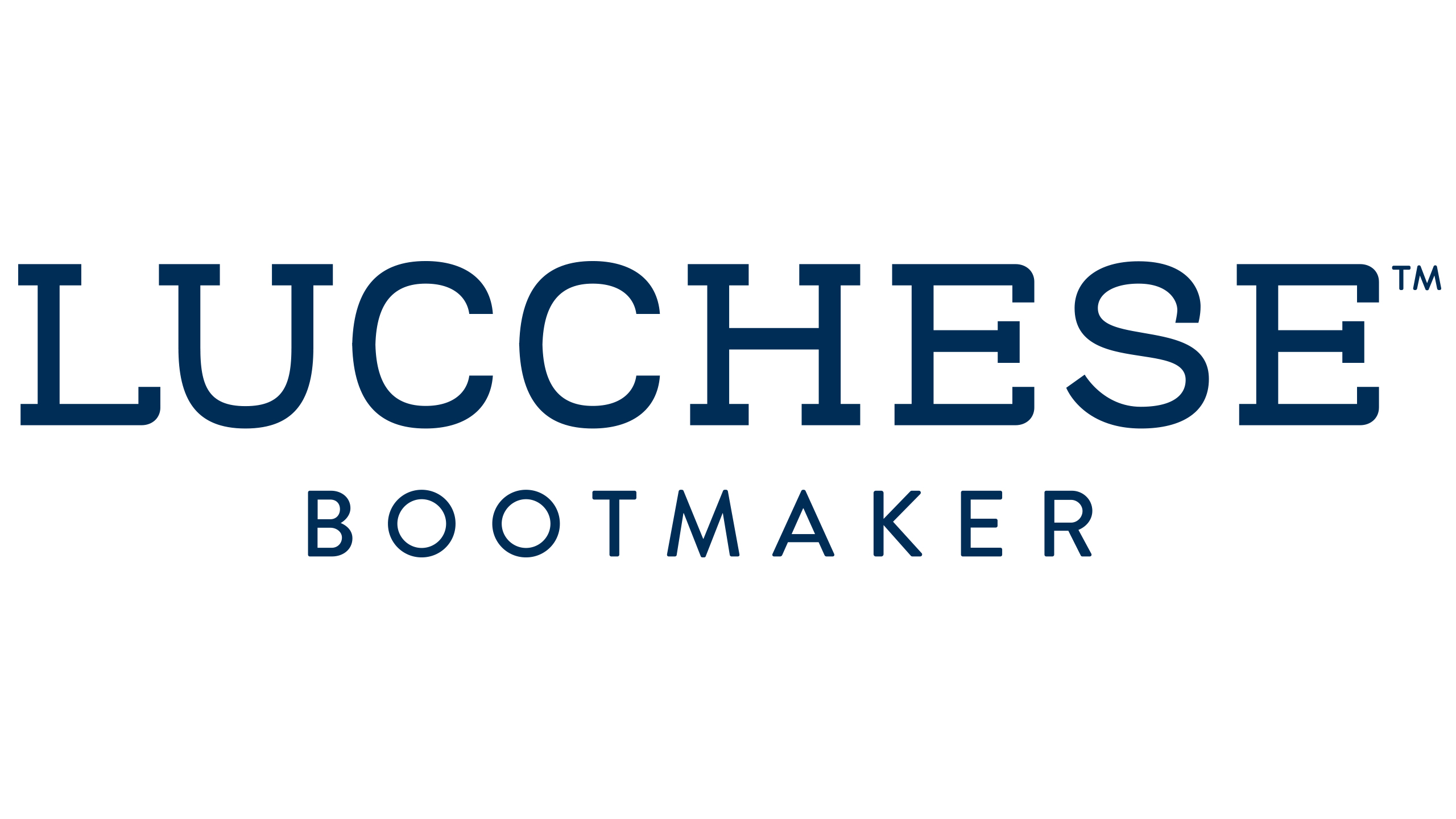
- Formerly: Lucchese Bros. Boots and Shoes and Lucchese Boot Company
- Industry: Footwear
- Founded: San Antonio, Texas, U.S. (1883)
- Founder: Salvatore "Sam" Lucchese
- Headquarters: El Paso, Texas, U.S.
- Key people: Salvatore Lucchese, Cosimo Lucchese, and Sam Lucchese; John Muse (Chairman)
- Products: Cowboy boots, western apparel, leather goods
- Website: lucchese.com

The Lucchese Bootmaker Company (/luːˈkeɪsi/) is a Texas-based, American manufacturer and retailer of luxury level cowboy boots and western apparel.

== History ==
Originally known as Lucchese Bros. Boots & Shoes, the company was founded in 1883 in San Antonio, Texas, by Salvatore "Sam" Lucchese (1868–1929) and his brothers, all Italian immigrants from Sicily. In the beginning, their primary customers were military officers in the United States Army that were stationed at Fort Sam Houston. Salvatore Lucchese believed in combining quality components and craftsmanship in the boot-making process. He committed himself to investing in the latest manufacturing technology and to developing new techniques for increased boot production.

In 1923, Salvatore Lucchese suffered a stroke, consequently his son Cosimo Lucchese took leadership of the company. In 1929, Cosimo led the effort to incorporate the Lucchese Boot Company.

In 1949, the company was commissioned by Acme Boots to build a collection of state boots for an advertising campaign. It took the Lucchese team four years to build the entire collection. Every pair of state boots is unique and features each state's flag, capital, bird, flower and state commodity. Fewer than 25 pairs are still in existence today.

In 1960, Cosimo Lucchese died suddenly and his son Sam Lucchese became company president. Sam counted both everyday customers and celebrities among his clientele, including President Lyndon B. Johnson, who was a Lucchese customer for decades. Other celebrities who wore Lucchese included singer Bing Crosby, actor James Garner, and Zsa Zsa Gabor, who had a pair of custom-made Lucchese boots. The late Dolph Briscoe, former Governor of the State of Texas, purchased his first pair of Lucchese boots in 1938 and his final pair in 2008.

In 1970, Lucchese Boot Company was sold to Blue Bell Overall Company, the parent company to Wrangler. Sam Lucchese died in May 1980.

In 1986, the company transferred its headquarters from San Antonio, Texas, to El Paso, Texas. Lucchese's main production facility remains there. In 1998, Blue Bell Corporation sold Lucchese to Arena Brands, a Western Apparel conglomerate that was formerly known as Hat Brands, Inc. In 2012, the name was changed to Lucchese Bootmaker. The company has global operations, having created and produced products in Texas, Mexico, Italy, and Brazil, all of which are made to Lucchese guidelines and standards of quality. In 2009, the company was recognized by the State of Texas Legislature for the company's contribution to Texas history and culture by passing House Concurrent Resolution 226. Four years later, in 2013, Lucchese launched a new consumer website. As of December 2020, Dallas businessman John Muse is the chairman of the company. Lucchese brand sponsorships include the Lucchese Polo Team.
