= Life Partners, Inc. =

- Industry: Life settlement provider
- Headquarters: Waco, Texas, United States
- Parent: Life Partners Holdings, Inc.
- Website: www.lifepartnersinc.com

Life Partners, Inc. is a life settlement provider headquartered in Waco, Texas. LPI's parent company, Life Partners Holdings, Inc., delisted from the NASDAQ, currently trades on the OTCPK under the ticker LPHI.Q. This follows the company seeking Chapter 11 bankruptcy protection, resulting from a total of $46.9 million in penalties levied against the company and two of its officers.

== Overview ==
Life Partners Inc. is the world's oldest life settlement provider and one of the most active companies in the world engaged in the secondary market for life insurance. Life Partners Inc. is the architect of the newest asset class, life settlements, which has grown over the past decade to become an $80 billion industry. By selling the policy, the policyholder receives an immediate cash payment to use as he or she wishes.

It filed for Chapter 11 bankruptcy protection on January 19, 2015.

Since its incorporation in 1991, Life Partners Inc. has completed over 150,000 transactions and generated a total business volume of over $3.2 billion in face value of policies for its worldwide client base of over 29,000 high-net-worth individuals and institutions in connection with the purchase of over 6,500 policies. Life Partners Inc. utilizes Advance Trust & Life Escrow Services, LTA for its life settlement transactions. ATLES is supervised and regulated by the Texas Department of Banking and is responsible for the custody and dispersion of LPI client funds.

== Senior citizen clientele ==
Through life settlements, the secondary market for life insurance provides more options for policy owners to pursue when they no longer want or need their current life insurance policy. Many seniors paying premiums on life insurance policies cannot afford to continue. Premiums have skyrocketed and the need for the policy has diminished. More than 85% will simply let their policies lapse. Most likely, they are unaware they can sell these policies for four to ten times the cash value in the secondary market. If seniors give the proceeds from their life insurance policy sale to charity, they may reap substantial tax benefits.

== Lawsuits and legal action ==
=== SEC legal actions ===
In January 2012, the SEC filed a civil action against Life Partners Holdings and three of its senior executives for an alleged fraudulent disclosure and accounting scheme involving life settlements. The SEC alleged that Life Partners' chairman and CEO, the president and general counsel, and the chief financial officer misled shareholders by failing to disclose a significant risk to Life Partners' business: the company was systematically and materially underestimating the life expectancy estimates it used to price transactions.

In 2011, a securities fraud class action lawsuit was filed on behalf of current and former shareholders Life Partners Holdings, Inc. The lawsuit alleged that LPHI violated US federal securities laws misleading its investors by issuing false financial statements and reports. The allegedly misleading statements led LPHI's stock price to increase and then dramatically plummet upon the uncovering of the misleading statements made by LPHI, thereby causing LPHI investors to suffer financial losses. On November 22, 2012, the court heard oral argument from the parties on the defendants' motion to dismiss. The court has not issued a ruling on the motion to dismiss. No trial date has been set. The viability of the case may be substantially affected by the U.S. Supreme Court's decision in Haliburton v. Erica P. John Fund which the Supreme Court is expected to rule on later this summer.

=== December 2013: Plaintiffs dismiss lawsuit against Life Partners—class certification denied ===
Life Partners Holdings, Inc. announced on December 4, 2013, that the plaintiffs have voluntarily dismissed a lawsuit filed against the company as well as its operating subsidiary, Life Partners, Inc., and two corporate officers. The abandonment of the lawsuit comes after the United States District Court for the Northern District of Texas denied a motion for class certification in the lawsuit. Life Partners, Inc. is a life settlement provider and provides purchasing agent services for life settlement transactions. A life settlement is an alternative investment involving the purchase of an existing life insurance policy at a discount to its face value.

While the plaintiffs in the case could have appealed the denial of the class action or continued to pursue the case as individuals, they elected instead to voluntarily dismiss the case against the Life Partners defendants. A key allegation was that Life Partners' medical consultant used an unreasonable method of estimating life expectancies. However, this allegation was criticized by the Court as part of its 34-page order denying certification as a class action:

Proof only of results does not address these factors. Nor could an after-the-fact analysis of the insureds' deaths, in the aggregate, establish that LPI was unreasonable in using Dr. Cassidy when and how it did. The Court is highly skeptical that an analysis of results alone could lead a reasonable juror to determine that Dr. Cassidy's methods were flawed.

Life Partners CEO Brian Pardo commented, "This is yet another example of attorney-driven litigation which damages the entire economy, not to mention the companies that are the targets of such litigation. We are very pleased that the plaintiffs decided to walk away from this case and we hope to see other similar cases end the same way."

The case is styled Sean Turnbow et al. v. Life Partners, Inc. et al., Case No. 3:11-CV-1030-M, United States District Court for the Northern District of Texas, Dallas Division.

=== March 2014: Life Partners cleared of all fraud claims ===
Life Partners Holdings, Inc. announced in March 2014 that an Austin Federal court has ruled that the Securities and Exchange Commission failed to prove any of its fraud claims against Life Partners and its CEO, Brian Pardo, and General Counsel, Scott Peden. The ruling followed a jury finding in February that neither Life Partners, Mr. Pardo nor Mr. Peden committed securities fraud under Rule 10b-5 and that Mr. Pardo and Mr. Peden did not engage in insider trading. In the earlier ruling, the jury had found in favor of the SEC's fraud claim under Section 17(a) relating to the company's revenue recognition policies. That claim, which a government attorney characterized as "a lead" claim in the case, was challenged by Life Partners on the basis that it was not supported by any evidence.

The United States District Court for the Western District of Texas, Austin Division agreed with Life Partners that there was no evidence to support the revenue recognition claims for the period of time in question and ordered that judgment be entered in favor of Life Partners, Mr. Pardo and Mr. Peden on that issue. As a result of this ruling, the Company, Mr. Pardo and Mr. Peden have been completely exonerated from any allegations of fraud alleged by the SEC. The Court let stand the jury's findings against Life Partners relating to bookkeeping, reporting and certification by the CEO of the company's financial statements, none of which involve fraud or knowingly or recklessly misleading shareholders. The case is SEC v. Life Partners Holdings, Inc. et al., Civil Action No. 1-12-C V-33-JRN in the United States District Court for the Western District of Texas, Austin Division.

=== April 2014: Life Partners sues Charles Schwab subsidiary for counterfeiting ===
On April 15, 2014, Life Partners Holdings, Inc. filed suit against optionsXpress, Inc., a subsidiary of The Charles Schwab Corporation, the company's chief financial officer, and one of the company's largest customers for issuing and selling counterfeit shares of Life Partners Holdings stock.

The lawsuit, filed in Illinois by California attorney Gary Aguirre, whose practice focuses on market manipulation, asks the Court for an order preventing the Schwab subsidiary from creating and selling shares of Life Partners Holdings' stock which were not authorized by the company. The action also asks the Court for protection from securities fraud, deceptive business practices and civil conspiracy arising from the unlawful issuance of the counterfeit shares.

Under the law of Illinois, Texas, and every other state, a company has the exclusive right to issue and sell its own stock. The creation and sale of counterfeit or "phantom" stock by brokers and their customers violate these laws.

The lawsuit is based on findings in an administrative proceeding by the U.S. Securities and Exchange Commission against optionsXpress and the other defendants which concluded that optionsXpress, its chief financial officer, and one of its biggest customers committed securities fraud by engaging in the sales of hundreds of millions of dollars in counterfeit-phantom stock passed off as the genuine stock of 25 public companies, including almost $5.5 million of counterfeit-phantom stock of Life Partners Holdings, Inc.

The company is continuing to investigate other persons and entities who may have engaged in counterfeiting shares of Life Partners Holdings, Inc.

=== December 2014: LPHI loses lawsuit with the SEC. LPHI, Pardo and Peden ordered to pay a total of $46.9 million in penalties ===
A federal judge ordered Life Partners Holdings Inc and two top executives to pay $46.9 million for misleading investors about the core aspects of its business. The U.S. Securities and Exchange Commission had sued Life Partners in 2012 and sought to prove that Life Partners intentionally misled investors over nearly four years about core aspects of its "life-settlements" business and that its two top executives engaged in insider trading. U.S. District Court Judge James Nowlin on Tuesday ordered Life Partners to pay $15 million in illegal profit and $23.7 million in civil penalties. Chief Executive Brian Pardo was ordered to pay a $6.2 million civil penalty, while general counsel and secretary of LPHI, R. Scott Peden, was given a $2 million civil penalty. Judge Nowlin reversed a jury finding in March that Life Partners and its executives were liable on one count of fraud. "In ordering this significant monetary relief, the court recognized the egregious nature of their misconduct, noting that the defendants engaged in 'serious violations' of the securities laws, that they 'deprived the investing public of the information it needed to make a fully informed decision about whether to invest in Life Partners," said Andrew Ceresney, SEC's enforcement director.

=== December 2016: Life Partners Inc. exits bankruptcy ===
On December 9, 2016, a Joint Plan of Reorganization sponsored by H. Thomas Moran, II the Chapter 11 trustee, and the Official Unsecured Creditors' Committee became effective. Life Partners emerged from bankruptcy, reorganized to maximize the recovery of investors' funds.

Moran was quoted as saying:

Within the next two weeks, distributions of more than $100 million collected from matured policies during the bankruptcy proceedings will be distributed to investors. Going forward, we project that investors will receive roughly 90 percent of their invested capital over time as a result of the plan we were able to put in place—depending on the option they elected.
