= Harold Jenkins (Shakespeare scholar) =

British Shakespeare scholar (1909–2000)

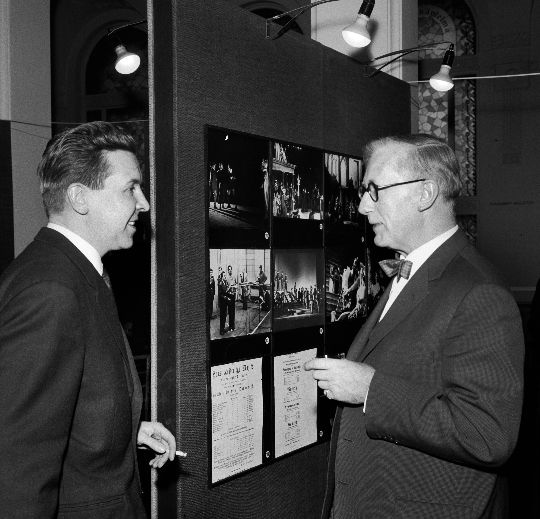
Professor Jenkins (right) talking with the Finnish actor Pentti Siimes in Helsinki, 1964

Harold Jenkins, FBA (19 July 1909 – 4 January 2000) is described as "one of the foremost Shakespeare scholars of his century".

His edition of Hamlet was published by Arden Shakespeare in 1982. It represents a peak in the editorial style of drawing on both quarto versions, particularly the 1604 quarto, and also the Folio of 1623, in order to create a single text. He wrote two monographs on Henry Chettle and Edward Benlowes, and he published editions of Elizabethan plays and numerous scholarly articles.

His long collaboration with the Arden Shakespeare started in the 1950s, with the commission to edit Hamlet. In 1958 he was named joint general editor of the series (along with Harold F. Brooks). In this capacity he worked with some of the most distinguished Shakespearean scholars of his time.

== Early life ==
Jenkins was raised in Shenley, Buckinghamshire. He was the eldest son of Henry Jenkins (1878–1932), a dairyman, and his wife, Mildred, née Carter. Jenkins was educated at a local school from age three, and won a place in 1920 at what was to become Wolverton grammar school. He went on in 1927 to University College, London, where he read English language and literature. He graduated in 1930 with honors, winning the George Morley medal in English literature and the George Smith studentship (1930–31). The award of the Quain studentship, which followed, allowed him to continue his studies for five more years, while he also taught. His MA thesis (1933) was on the Elizabethan dramatist, Henry Chettle. This thesis was supervised by W. W. Greg, and was subsequently published as The Life and Work of Henry Chettle.

== Career ==
After one year as William Noble fellow in the University of Liverpool he took up a lectureship in English in 1936 at the University of the Witwatersrand in South Africa, where he stayed until 1945. His Witwatersrand doctorate thesis was later published as Edward Benlowes (1602–76): Biography of a Minor Poet (1952). While in South Africa, he reviewed books in the medium of radio broadcasts from 1940 until 1945. In 1945, after a decade in South Africa, he returned to London as a professor at University College London and soon was promoted to Reader. In 1954 he was the first chair of English at Westfield College. During this time, he published essays on Shakespeare's Twelfth Night and As You Like It, and he published the study The Structural Problem in Henry IV (1956), which was his inaugural lecture at Westfield College.

In 1954 Jenkins agreed to edit Shakespeare's Hamlet for the New Arden Shakespeare, and then in 1958 he became joint general editor of the Arden series, along with Harold Brooks. Jenkins believed "editing was the most valuable of all scholarly activities, for the edition of a text will stand for future ages long after the fogs of critical opinion have dispersed" Writing in the Shakespeare Newsletter, he said that "the complex relation between Q2 and F remains the chief unsolved problem of the Hamlet texts". E. A. J. Honigmann suggests that Jenkins’ characteristic spirit of combativeness in the notes to the Arden Hamlet may surprise some readers, but that it is “connected to Jenkins' flair for getting at the truth and the great value he places on it.”

He was a visiting professor at Duke University in America from 1957 to 1958. In 1967 he became Regius Professor of Rhetoric and English at the University of Edinburgh. He retired early (in 1971) in London to work on his edition of Hamlet, published in 1982. His work on Hamlet produced eight articles or major lectures, including his British Academy lecture in 1963, "Hamlet and Ophelia", and his 1967 lecture at the University of Edinburgh, "The Catastrophe in Shakespearean Tragedy". He also was a professor at the University of Oslo. According to The Guardian, "His courtesy and brilliance as a lecturer marked the whole of his career, and no one who has been his student will forget his lectures, which were outstanding for their wit and vivacity, as well as their clarity of analysis."

He was a member of the council of the Malone Society (1955–1989) and its president 1989–2000. He was on the editorial board of Shakespeare Survey (1964–72). He was a senior fellow of the British Academy (1989), a fellow of University College London (1992), and a fellow of the Royal Society of Literature (1999). Jenkins received an honorary D.Litt. from Iona College in New Rochelle (1983). In 1986 Jenkins received the annual Shakespeare Prize from the Hamburg-based Alfred Toepfer Foundation and the fellowship of the British Academy in 1989. A book of essays published in 1987 in his honor, Fanned and Winnowed Opinions, takes its title from a line in Hamlet (Act V, scene ii, line 189). It includes sixteen essays by an "impressive list of contributors including several who edited plays for Arden Shakespeare under Jenkins direction, including Harold Brooks, E. A. J. Honigmann, Kenneth Palmer, Kenneth Muir, and Richard Proudfoot. It also includes a memoir and a bibliography of Jenkins' publications. Jenkins served on the council of the Malone Society for forty years, and he was elected its president in 1989.

== Marriage ==
He met his wife, Gladys Puddifoot (1908–1984), when they were both students. They married in South Africa in 1939. She soon became a highly regarded historian, and she shared his scholarly interests until her death in a car accident in 1984. In his preface to Hamlet he thanks and pays tribute to her. They travelled together a great deal.

== Death and legacy ==
He died at his home in Surrey, and he left his books and papers to Queen Mary and Westfield College. His more personal papers, including his diaries, were left with his niece, Catherine Warnock. His wife’s diaries include personal details including the fact that Jenkins liked to go surfing. Jenkins was known as one who "loved congenial company, good conversation, entertaining friends at the Athenaeum, and good food and wine. He was a witty and charming host."

== Selected books and publications ==
- The Tragedy of Hoffman
- The Fatal Marriage
- The Book of Sir Thomas More
- The Life and Work of Henry Chettle
- ”Chettle and Dekker”
- Edward Benlowes (1602-1676): Biography of a Minor Poet
- The structural problem in Shakespeare's Henry the Fourth. An inaugural lecture delivered at Westfield College, University of London, on 19 May 1955
- Catastrophe in Shakespearian Tragedy
- Hamlet
- Hamlet: Playgoer's Edition
- Structural Problems in Shakespeare: Lectures and Essays by Harold Jenkins
