= Arden Shakespeare =

Scholarly editions of the works of Shakespeare

The Arden Shakespeare is a long-running series of scholarly editions of the works of William Shakespeare. It presents fully edited modern-spelling editions of the plays and poems, with lengthy introductions and full commentaries. There have been three distinct series of The Arden Shakespeare over the past century, with the third series commencing in 1995 and concluding in January 2020. The fourth series is scheduled to commence publication in 2026.

Arden was the maiden name of Shakespeare's mother, Mary, but the primary reference of the enterprise's title is to the Forest of Arden, in which Shakespeare's As You Like It is set.

== First Series ==
The first series was published by Methuen. Its first publication was Edward Dowden's edition of Hamlet, published in 1899. Over the next 25 years, the entire canon of Shakespeare was edited and published. The original editor of The Arden Shakespeare was William James Craig (1899–1906), succeeded by R. H. Case (1909–1944). The text of The Arden Shakespeare, First series, was based on the 1864 "Globe" or Cambridge edition of Shakespeare's Complete Works, edited by William George Clark and John Glover, as revised in 1891–93.

The list of the first series is as follows:

Editor	Title	Year of publication
Edward Dowden	Hamlet	1899
Edward Dowden	Romeo and Juliet	1900
W. J. Craig	King Lear	1901
Michael Macmillan	Julius Caesar	1902
Morton Luce	The Tempest	1902
Edward Dowden	Cymbeline	1903
H. C. Hart	Othello	1903
Herbert Arthur Evans	Henry V	1904
W. Osbourne Brigstoke	All's Well That Ends Well	1904
H. C. Hart	Love's Labour's Lost	1904
H. C. Hart	The Merry Wives of Windsor	1904
H. Bellyse Balldon	Titus Andronicus	1904
Henry Cuningham	A Midsummer Night's Dream	1905
H. C. Hart	Measure for Measure	1905
K. Deighton	Timon of Athens	1905
R. Warwick Bond	The Taming of the Shrew	1905
Charles Knox Pooler	The Merchant of Venice	1905
R. Warwick Bond	Two Gentlemen of Verona	1906
Morton Luce	Twelfth Night	1906
K. Deighton	Troilus and Cressida	1906
R. H. Case	Antony and Cleopatra	1906
K. Deighton	Pericles	1907
Ivor B. John	King John	1907
Henry Cuningham	The Comedy of Errors	1907
A. Hamilton Thompson	Richard III	1907
H. C. Hart	1 Henry VI	1909
H. C. Hart	2 Henry VI	1909
H. C. Hart	3 Henry VI	1910
Charles Knox Pooler	Poems	1911
Henry Cuningham	Macbeth	1912
Ivor B. John	Richard II	1912
F. W. Moorman	The Winter's Tale	1912
J. W. Holme	As You Like It	1914
R. P. Cowl, A. E. Morgan	1 Henry IV	1914
Charles Knox Pooler	Henry VIII	1915
Charles Knox Pooler	Sonnets	1918
W. J. Craig	Coriolanus	1922
R. P. Cowl	2 Henry IV	1923
Grace R. Trenery	Much Ado About Nothing	1924

== Second Series ==
The second series began in 1946, with a new group of editors freshly re-editing the plays, and was completed in the 1980s, though the Sonnets never appeared. It was published by Methuen in both hardback and paperback. Later issues of the paperbacks featured cover art by the Brotherhood of Ruralists. The second series was edited by Una Ellis-Fermor (1946–58); Harold F. Brooks (1952–82), Harold Jenkins (1958–82) and Brian Morris (1975–82). Unlike the first series, where each volume was based on the same textual source (The Globe Shakespeare), the individual editors of each volume of the second series were responsible for editing the text of the play in that edition.

Editions in the second series
Editor	Title	Year	Notes
Kenneth Muir	Macbeth	1951	
Richard David	Love's Labour's Lost	1951	
Kenneth Muir	King Lear	1952	
J.C. Maxwell	Titus Andronicus	1953	
Frank Kermode	The Tempest	1954	Reprinted with revisions in 1957.
M. R. Ridley	Antony and Cleopatra	1954	The introduction by Case from the First Series was reprinted.
J.H. Walter	Henry V	1954	
E. A. J. Honigmann	King John	1954	
John Russell Brown	The Merchant of Venice	1955	
T. S. Dorsch	Julius Caesar	1955	
J. M. Nosworthy	Cymbeline	1955	
Peter Ure	Richard II	1956	
Andrew S. Cairncross	2 Henry VI	1957	
R. A. Foakes	Henry VIII	1957	
H. J. Oliver	Timon of Athens	1959	
M.R. Ridley	Othello	1959	
G. K. Hunter	All's Well That Ends Well	1959	
A. R. Humphreys	1 Henry IV	1960	
F. T. Prince	The Poems	1960	Venus and Adonis and The Rape of Lucrece
Andrew S. Cairncross	1 Henry VI	1962	
R. A. Foakes	Comedy of Errors	1962	
F. D. Hoeniger	Pericles	1963	
J. H. P. Pafford	The Winter's Tale	1963	
Andrew S. Cairncross	3 Henry VI	1964	
J. W. Lever	Measure for Measure	1964	
A. R. Humphreys	2 Henry IV	1966	
Clifford Leech	Two Gentlemen of Verona	1969	
H. J. Oliver	The Merry Wives of Windsor	1971	
Agnes Latham	As You Like It	1975	
J. M. Lothian and Thomas W. Craik	Twelfth Night	1975	
Philip Brockbank	Coriolanus	1976	
Harold F. Brooks	A Midsummer Night's Dream	1979	
Brian Gibbons	Romeo and Juliet	1980	
A. R. Humphreys	Much Ado About Nothing	1981	
Anthony Hammond	Richard III	1981	
Brian Morris	The Taming of the Shrew	1981	
K. J. Palmer	Troilus and Cressida	1982	
Harold Jenkins	Hamlet	1982	

== Third Series ==
The third series of The Arden Shakespeare began to be edited during the 1980s, with publication starting in 1995 and concluding in 2020. The general editors for this series were Richard Proudfoot; Ann Thompson of King's College London; David Scott Kastan of Yale University; and H. R. Woudhuysen of the University of Oxford.

The first editions in this series were published by Routledge, before moving to Thomson. They then moved to Cengage Learning. In December 2008, the series returned to Methuen, becoming part of Methuen Drama, its original publisher. From February 2013, the titles appeared under the Bloomsbury imprint.

The editions in the third series were published very much in line with the traditions established by The Arden Shakespeare; however, editions in this series tended to be thicker than those of the first and second series, with more explanatory notes and much longer introductions. One unusual aspect of this series was its edition of Hamlet, which presents the play in two separate volumes. The first, released in 2006, contained an edited text of the Second Quarto (1604–05), with passages found only in the First Folio included in an appendix, while the supplementary second volume, released a year later, contained both the text of the First Quarto (sometimes called the "bad" quarto) of 1603, and of the First Folio of 1623. Other plays with "bad" quartos have them reproduced via photographs of each leaf of a surviving copy rather than deal with each textual anomaly on an individual basis.

=== Editions ===
Due to the long period of time over which the series was published, several editions of the third series were re-issued in revised editions, from 2010 to 2018. Eight editions were reissued in revised form. Some contained minor revisions in later printings, such as Henry V, but are not so noted on the title page. Editions that were revised are marked with the year of revised publication in the 'Year' column.

Editions in the third series
Title	Year	Editor	Notes
King Henry V	1995 (r. 1997)	T. W. Craik	Contains a complete photo facsimile of Q.
Antony and Cleopatra	1995	John Wilders	
Titus Andronicus	1995 (r. 2018)	Jonathan Bate	
Othello	1996 (r. 2016)	E. A. J. Honigmann	Ayanna Thompson contributed a new introduction to the 2016 revised edition (Note: Owing to the 2011 death of E. A. J. Honigmann, the original editor, the revision of this edition was undertaken by Ayanna Thompson. This was the only instance in the series where the revising editor was different to the original editor.).
The Two Noble Kinsmen	1996 (r. 2015)	Lois Potter	The play is attributed to Shakespeare and John Fletcher on the title page.
King Lear	1997	R. A. Foakes	Contrary to the editors' decision to publish the three versions of Hamlet as three separate texts, Foakes' edition of King Lear is based upon a conflation of the quarto and folio texts of the tragedy, disregarding the practice established by the Oxford Shakespeare of treating them as two separate texts.
Shakespeare's Sonnets	1997 (r. 2010)	Katherine Duncan-Jones	Contains every poetic work included in the original Shakespeare's Sonnets quarto of 1609—that is, 154 sonnets, plus the narrative poem A Lover's Complaint (a work the authorship of which is often disputed).
Troilus and Cressida	1998 (r. 2015)	David Bevington	
Love's Labour's Lost	1998	H. R. Woudhuysen	
Julius Caesar	1998	David Daniell	
King Henry VI Part 2	1999	Ronald Knowles	
The Merry Wives of Windsor	1999	Giorgio Melchiori	Contains a complete photo facsimile of Q.
The Tempest	1999 (r. 2011)	Virginia Mason Vaughan; Alden T. Vaughan	
King Henry VI Part 1	2000	Edward Burns	
King Henry VIII	2000	Gordon McMullan	The play is attributed to Shakespeare and John Fletcher on the title page.
King Henry VI Part 3	2001	John D. Cox; Eric Rasmussen	
King Richard II	2002	Charles R. Forker	
King Henry IV Part 1	2002	David Scott Kastan	
The Two Gentlemen of Verona	2004	William C. Carroll	
Pericles, Prince of Tyre	2004	Suzanne Gossett	The play is attributed to Shakespeare and George Wilkins on the title page.
Much Ado About Nothing	2005 (r. 2016)	Claire McEachern	
Hamlet	2006 (r. 2016)	Ann Thompson; Neil Taylor	Contains the Q2 (1604) text.
Hamlet: The Texts of 1603 and 1623	2007	Ann Thompson; Neil Taylor	Contains the Q1 (1603) and FF (1623) text. A supplementary volume to the main edition (above) based on Q2 (1604).
As You Like It	2006	Juliet Dusinberre	
Shakespeare's Poems	2007	Katherine Duncan-Jones; H. R. Woudhuysen	Contains Shakespeare's two major narrative poems—Venus and Adonis and The Rape of Lucrece—as well as his metaphysical poem The Phoenix and the Turtle, plus several shorter works attributed to Shakespeare.
Twelfth Night	2008	Keir Elam	
Timon of Athens	2008	Anthony B. Dawson; Gretchen E. Minton	The play is attributed to Shakespeare and Thomas Middleton on the title page.
King Richard III	2009	James R. Siemon	
The Taming of the Shrew	2010	Barbara Hodgdon	Contains a complete photo facsimile of The Taming of a Shrew.
The Winter's Tale	2010	John Pitcher	
The Merchant of Venice	2011	John Drakakis	
Romeo and Juliet	2012	René Weis	
Coriolanus	2013	Peter Holland	
Macbeth	2015	Sandra Clark; Pamela Mason	
King Henry IV Part 2	2016	James C. Bulman	
The Comedy of Errors	2016	Kent Cartwright	
Cymbeline	2017	Valerie Wayne	
A Midsummer Night's Dream	2017	Sukanta Chaudhuri	
King John	2018	Jesse M. Lander; J. J. M. Tobin	
All's Well That Ends Well	2018	Helen Wilcox; Suzanne Gossett	
Measure for Measure	2020	A. R. Braunmuller; Robert N. Watson	

=== Apocrypha ===
The third series was also notable for publishing single-volume editions of certain plays that traditionally form part of the so-called Shakespeare Apocrypha, but for which there is considered good evidence of Shakespeare having at least been co-author. Three apocryphal plays were published in this manner.

- Double Falsehood, edited by Brean Hammond (2010) (Note: The edition adopts the belief that the play is the only surviving version of Shakespeare and Fletcher's lost tragicomedy Cardenio, revised by Lewis Theobald for eighteenth century audiences.)
- Sir Thomas More, edited by John Jowett (2011) (Note: This edition identifies Shakespeare as one reviser of a play originally written by Anthony Munday and Henry Chettle, the other revisers supposedly being Chettle, Thomas Dekker, Thomas Heywood, and the unidentified "Hand C".)
- King Edward III, edited by Richard Proudfoot and Nicola Bennett (2017)

== Fourth Series ==
In March 2015, Bloomsbury Academic named Peter Holland of the University of Notre Dame, Zachary Lesser of the University of Pennsylvania, and Tiffany Stern of the University of Birmingham's Shakespeare Institute as general editors of The Arden Shakespeare fourth series. The fourth series commenced publication in 2026 with the following volume editors announced:

Editions in the fourth series
Title	Year	Editor	Notes
Titus Andronicus	2026	Ayanna Thompson & Curtis Perry	
Julius Caesar	2026	Andrew Hartley	
As You Like It	2026	Tom Bishop	
King Richard III	2026	Sonia Massai	
Twelfth Night	2026	Emma Smith	
A Midsummer Night's Dream	TBC	Urvashi Chakravarty	
All's Well That Ends Well	TBC	Erin Sullivan	
Antony and Cleopatra	TBC	Benedict Robinson	
Coriolanus	TBC	Laden Niayesh	
Hamlet	TBC	M.J. Kidnie	
Henry IV Part 1	TBC	Lucy Munro	
Henry IV Part 2	TBC	Misha Teramura	
Henry V	TBC	Gretchen Minton	
Henry VI Part 1	TBC	Claire M.L. Bourne	
Henry VI Part 2	TBC	Sarah Neville	
Henry VI Part 3	TBC	Will Sharpe	
Henry VIII	TBC	Iolanda Plescia	
King John	TBC	José A. Pérez Díez	
King Lear	TBC	Peter Holland	
Love's Labour's Lost	TBC	Adam Zucker	
Macbeth	TBC	Zachary Lesser	
Measure for Measure	TBC	Alice Dailey	
Much Ado About Nothing	TBC	Sujata Iyengar	
Othello	TBC	Patricia Akhimie	
Pericles, Prince of Tyre	TBC	Adam Smyth	
Poems	TBC		Venus and Adonis and The Rape of Lucrece
Richard II	TBC	Karen Britland	
Romeo and Juliet	TBC	Douglas Bruster	
Shakespeare's Sonnets	TBC	Lukas Erne	
Sir Thomas More	TBC		
The Merchant of Venice	TBC	Shaul Bassi	
The Merry Wives of Windsor	TBC	Evelyn Tribble	
The Taming of the Shrew	TBC	James Marino	
The Tempest	TBC	Tiffany Stern	
The Two Gentlemen of Verona	TBC	Hester Lees-Jeffries	
The Two Noble Kinsmen	TBC	Claire McManus	
The Winter's Tale	TBC	Peter Kirwan	
Timon of Athens	TBC	David McInnis	
Troilus and Cressida	TBC		

== Arden Early Modern Drama ==
In 2009, The Arden Shakespeare launched a companion series, entitled "Arden Early Modern Drama". The series follows the formatting and scholarly style of The Arden Shakespeare third series, but shifts the focus onto other English Renaissance playwrights, primarily the Elizabethan, Jacobean, and Caroline periods (although the plays Everyman and Mankind hail from the reign of King Henry VII).

The general editors for this series are Suzanne Gossett of Loyola University Chicago; John Jowett of the Shakespeare Institute, University of Birmingham; and Gordon McMullan of King's College London.

- The Duchess of Malfi by John Webster, edited by Leah Marcus (2009)
- Everyman and Mankind, edited by Douglas Bruster and Eric Rasmussen (2009)
- Philaster by Francis Beaumont and John Fletcher, edited by Suzanne Gossett (2009)
- The Renegado by Philip Massinger, edited by Michael Neill (2010)
- 'Tis Pity She's a Whore by John Ford, edited by Sonia Massai (2011)
- The Tragedy of Mariam by Elizabeth Cary, edited by Ramona Wray (2012)
- The Island Princess by John Fletcher, edited by Clare McManus (2013)
- The Spanish Tragedy by Thomas Kyd, edited by Clara Calvo and Jesús Tronch (2013)
- A Jovial Crew by Richard Brome, edited by Tiffany Stern (2014)
- The Witch of Edmonton by Thomas Dekker, John Ford and William Rowley, edited by Lucy Munro (2016).
- A Woman Killed with Kindness by Thomas Heywood, edited by Margaret Kidnie (2017).
- The Dutch Courtesan by John Marston, edited by Karen Britland (2018).
- The Revenger's Tragedy by Thomas Middleton, edited by Gretchen Minton (2018).
- The White Devil by John Webster, edited by Benedict S. Robinson (2018).
- The Jew of Malta by Christopher Marlowe, edited by William H. Sherman and Chloe Preedy (2021).
- Arden of Faversham, edited by Catherine Richardson (2022).
- The Alchemist by Ben Jonson, edited by Tanya Pollard (2023).
- The Shoemakers' Holiday, edited by James Loxley (2024).
- Volpone by Ben Jonson, edited by John Jowett (2024).
- Edward II by Christopher Marlowe, edited by Jeffrey Masten (2026).

== Complete Works ==
Arden Shakespeare has also published a Complete Works of Shakespeare, which reprints editions from the second and third series but without the explanatory notes.

== Arden Performance Editions ==
In 2017, The Arden Shakespeare launched a new series of Performance Editions of Shakespeare's major plays, aimed specifically for use by actors and directors in the rehearsal room, and drama students in the classroom. Each edition features facing-page notes, short definitions of words, guidance on metre and punctuation, large font for easy reading, and plenty of blank space to write notes. The series editors are Professor Michael Dobson and Dr Abigail Rokison-Woodall and leading Shakespearean actor, Simon Russell Beale. The series is published in association with the Shakespeare Institute.

== Critical literature ==
The Arden Shakespeare has also published a number of series of literary and historical criticism to accompany The Arden Shakespeare Third Series and Arden Early Modern Drama imprints.
