= Jaques (As You Like It) =

Character in As You Like It

- As You Like It character
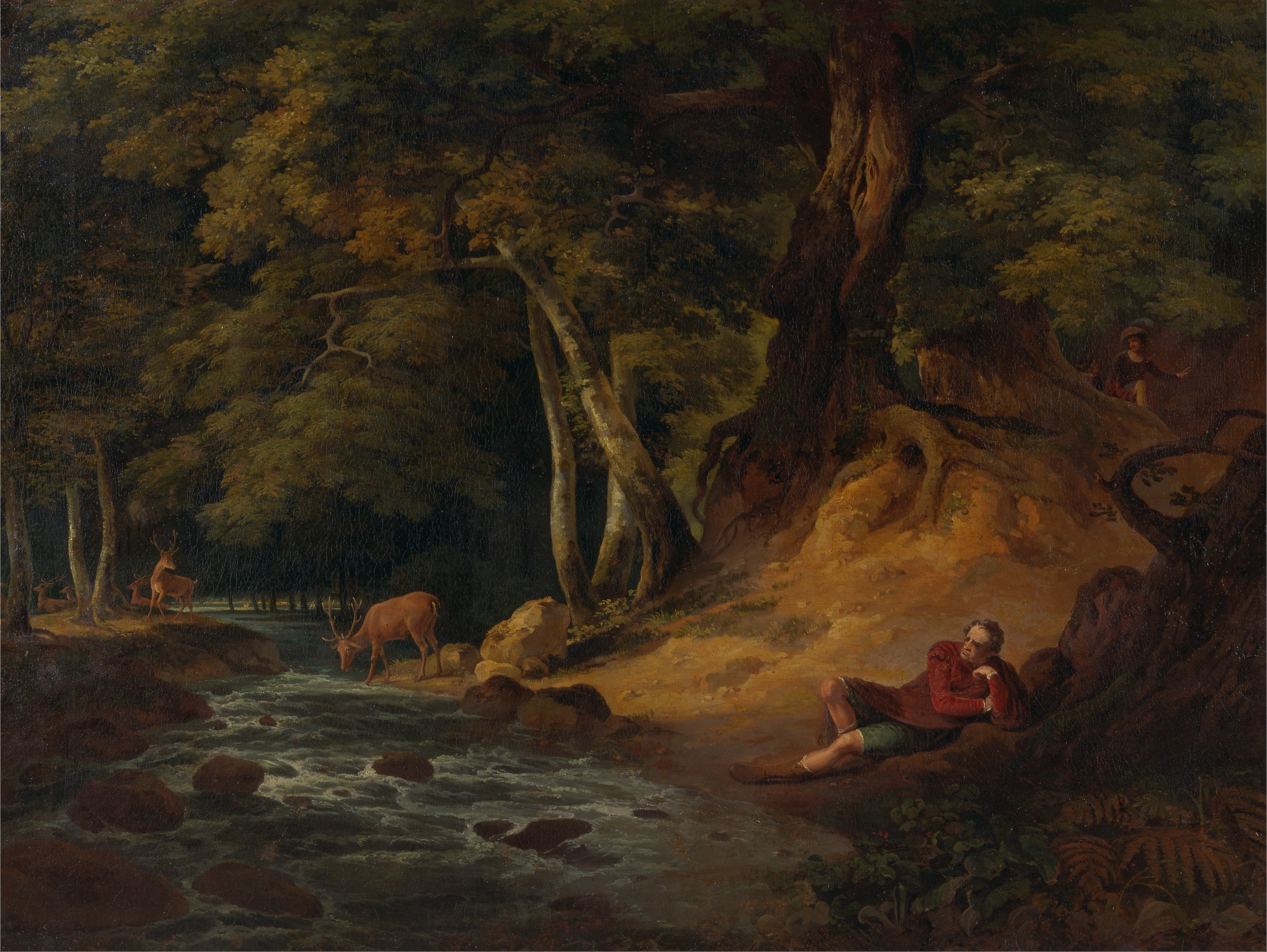
- Jaques and the Wounded Stag by William Hodges (1790)
- Created by: William Shakespeare

Jaques (variously /ˈdʒeɪkwiːz/ and /ˈdʒeɪkz/) is one of the main characters in Shakespeare's As You Like It. "The melancholy Jaques", as he is known, is one of the exiled Duke Senior's noblemen who lives with him in the Forest of Arden. Jaques takes no part in the unfolding of the plot, and confines himself to wry comment on the action and exchanges with his fellow characters. He has one of Shakespeare's best-known speeches, "All the world's a stage".

== Role ==
Shakespeare took much of the plot and most of the principal characters of As You Like It from Thomas Lodge's pastoral romance Rosalynd, published in 1590. He added nine new characters, chief among whom are the jester Touchstone and Jaques. The former is cheerful and optimistic; the latter introverted and pessimistic. (Note: In an article published in The Bookman in 1903, Flora Masson put forward the hypothesis that Shakespeare's Jaques was meant as a caricature of Lodge.) Dame Helen Gardner has described Touchstone as the parodist who must love what he parodies, and Jaques as the cynic who cannot be cured of melancholy because he likes himself as he is. Clement Scott contrasted Touchstone "the licensed whipper of affectations, the motley mocker of the time" with Jaques, "the blasé sentimentalist and cynical Epicurean" – "happy harmonising of two moods of folly". Neither character helps to advance the plot, and as commentators on the action they act as a link between the poet and the audience. Albert H. Tolman comments that Jaques is a fortunate addition by Shakespeare: "His pungent comments upon those about him and on human life relieve the general tone of sugary romanticism".

In his study of Shakespeare's characters (1817), William Hazlitt wrote:

Jaques is the only purely contemplative character in Shakespeare. He thinks, and does nothing. His whole occupation is to amuse his mind, and he is totally regardless of his body and his fortunes. He is the prince of philosophical idlers; his only passion is thought; he sets no value upon anything, but as it serves as food for reflection. He can "suck melancholy out of a song, as a weasel sucks eggs"; the motley fool, "who morals on the time", is the greatest prize he meets with in the forest.

The character is introduced at second hand, at the beginning of Act II, when one of the banished Duke's attendant lords describes Jaques' distress at the killing of a deer to feed the exiles, and his comparison of the seeming unconcern of the other deer with the indifference of humanity to the troubles of fellow humans. When first seen in person, Jaques is calling for an encore to "Under the Greenwood Tree", a song sung by Amiens, one of the Duke's retinue. Amiens objects that this will make Jaques still more melancholy; he replies that this pleases him, and after Amiens has obliged with another verse, he adds a satirical verse of his own, wryly saying that he and his colleagues are fools to have abandoned their "wealth and ease, a stubborn will to please".

Jaques' second appearance in the play shows him in an unmelancholy and delighted frame of mind, after an offstage encounter with Touchstone – "A fool, a fool! I met a fool i' the forest". Jaques is seized with the idea that he has found his true vocation, and bids his comrades "Invest me in my motley" so that he can become a professional jester. Later in the same scene (Act II, scene 7) he has his most famous speech, often called "The Seven Ages of Man", in which he gives brief depictions of the stages of a man's life from cradle to old age:

All the world's a stage,
And all the men and women merely players:
They have their exits and their entrances;
And one man in his time plays many parts,
His acts being seven ages...

Kenneth Muir has observed that the speech "is a variation on the motto of the new theatre to which Shakespeare’s company had recently moved". (Note: The motto, Totus mundus agit histrionem – literally, "The whole world acts as an actor", is more often loosely translated as "All the world's a playhouse". Scholars including Arthur Quiller-Couch, John Dover Wilson and Agnes Latham have accepted the tradition that it was the motto of the Globe, but some later scholars have contended that there is no evidence that it was.) In a study of Shakespeare's melancholics, W. I. D. Scott comments that this "lends support to the conception of Jaques as a commentating mouthpiece with views on life at the pessimistic extreme of Shakespeare's own, balanced by the optimism of the other commentator, Touchstone".

Later in the play, Jaques has scenes with Orlando (by whose romantic feelings for Rosalind he is exasperated), Touchstone (whom he advises to marry in church, if he must marry at all, rather than in the forest by a clergyman of dubious reputation) and Rosalind, who gently mocks his affectations. At the end of the play, when the lovers are united and the banished Duke is about to be restored to his duchy, Jaques declares his intention to join the usurping Duke, who has renounced his usurpation and become a hermit. He bids the others farewell:

To Duke Senior
You to your former honour I bequeath;
Your patience and your virtue well deserves it:
To Orlando
You to a love that your true faith doth merit:
To Oliver
You to your land and love and great allies:
To Silvius
You to a long and well-deserved bed:
To Touchstone
And you to wrangling; for thy loving voyage
Is but for two months victuall'd. So, to your pleasures:
I am for other than for dancing measures.

== Pronunciation ==
In The Oxford Dictionary of Original Shakespearean Pronunciation, David Crystal writes that the name has two different pronunciations in the play. The scansion of the blank verse requires it to be "Jayks" (/ˈdʒeɪkz/)) at some points and "Jayqueez" (/ˈdʒeɪkwiːz/) at others. (Note: e.g. "And never stays to greet him: 'Ay,' quoth Jaques", for the first and "The melancholy Jaques grieves at that" for the second.) The monosyllabic version is used for comic effect at times: "jakes" was 16th-century slang for "privy", (Note: In King Lear, Kent says to Cornwall, regarding Oswald: "My lord, if you'll give me leave, I will tread this unbolted villain into mortar and daub the walls of a jakes with him" (Act II. Scene 2. 65-67)) and in one scene Touchstone refers to Jaques as "Master What-ye-call't" rather than say the coarse word "jakes" in mixed company.

== Notes, references and sources ==
=== Sources ===
- Baldwin, E.C. (1910). "Introduction". Rosalynde. Boston / New York City: Ginn. OCLC 213516611.
- Crystal, David (2016). The Oxford Dictionary of Shakespearean Pronunciation. Oxford: Oxford University Press. ISBN 978-0-19-966842-7.
- Egan, Gabriel (2001). "Globe Theatre". In Dobson, John; Wells, Stanley (eds.). The Oxford Companion to Shakespeare. Oxford: Oxford University Press. ISBN 978-0-19-811735-3.
- Gardner, Helen (1959). "As You Like It". In Garrett, John (ed.). More Talking of Shakespeare. London: Longmans. OCLC 1150800668.
- Gay, Penny (1999). "Introduction". As You Like It. Oxford: Oxford University Press. ISBN 978-0-74-630910-0.
- Hazlitt, William (1854). Characters of Shakespeare's Plays (fifth ed.). London: C. Templeman. OCLC 558875320.
- Muir, Kenneth (1965). Shakespeare's Sources. London: Methuen. OCLC 1151273719.
- Scott, W.I.D. (1962). Shakespeare's Melancholics. London: Mills & Boon. OCLC 1151273719.
- Tolman, Albert H. (February 1922). "Shakespeare's Manipulation of His Sources in As You Like It". Modern Language Notes. 37 (2): 65–76. doi:10.2307/2915010. JSTOR 2915010. (subscription required)
