= William James Craig =

19th-century British editor

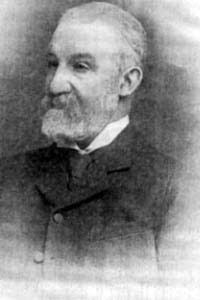
W. J. Craig

William James Craig (6 November 1843 – 23 December 1906) was an editor of Shakespeare's plays who produced the first Oxford Shakespeare for the Oxford University Press.

== Early life ==
Craig was born in Macosquin, County Londonderry, Ireland, where his father was an Anglican minister, on 6 November 1843 and he was educated at Portora School, Enniskillen. In 1861 he was admitted to Trinity College, Dublin, graduating BA in 1865 and being awarded his MA in 1870. He remained at Trinity for four further years, as a lecturer in literature and history.

== Tutor and editor ==
In 1874 Craig moved to London, where he became a private tutor for the Civil Service and Army entrance examinations, and university matriculation. From 1877 until 1879 he held the position of Professor of English at University College, Aberystwyth. In 1883 he published his first edition of Shakespeare: the New Shakspere Society's Cymbeline, collated from editions of the First Folio. The complete Oxford Shakespeare followed in December 1891. Although marketed as a "portable" edition, from the fine india paper upon which it was printed, the particular feature of this edition was its "Index of Characters" and a glossary. It had been Craig's intention to expand his glossary for separate publication, but this was unfinished at the time of his death. In 1901 he succeeded Edward Dowden, a friend from his student days at Trinity, as general editor of the Arden Shakespeare series, while continuing to teach English literature to private pupils from his rooms at 55a Gloucester Place, London. Among his pupils was the future novelist and lecturer in English literature Natsume Sōseki, who had been sent to London on a scholarship from the Japanese government.

Craig died in London on 12 December 1906. He had never married.
