= Eric Rasmussen (academic) =

Renaissance English literature scholar

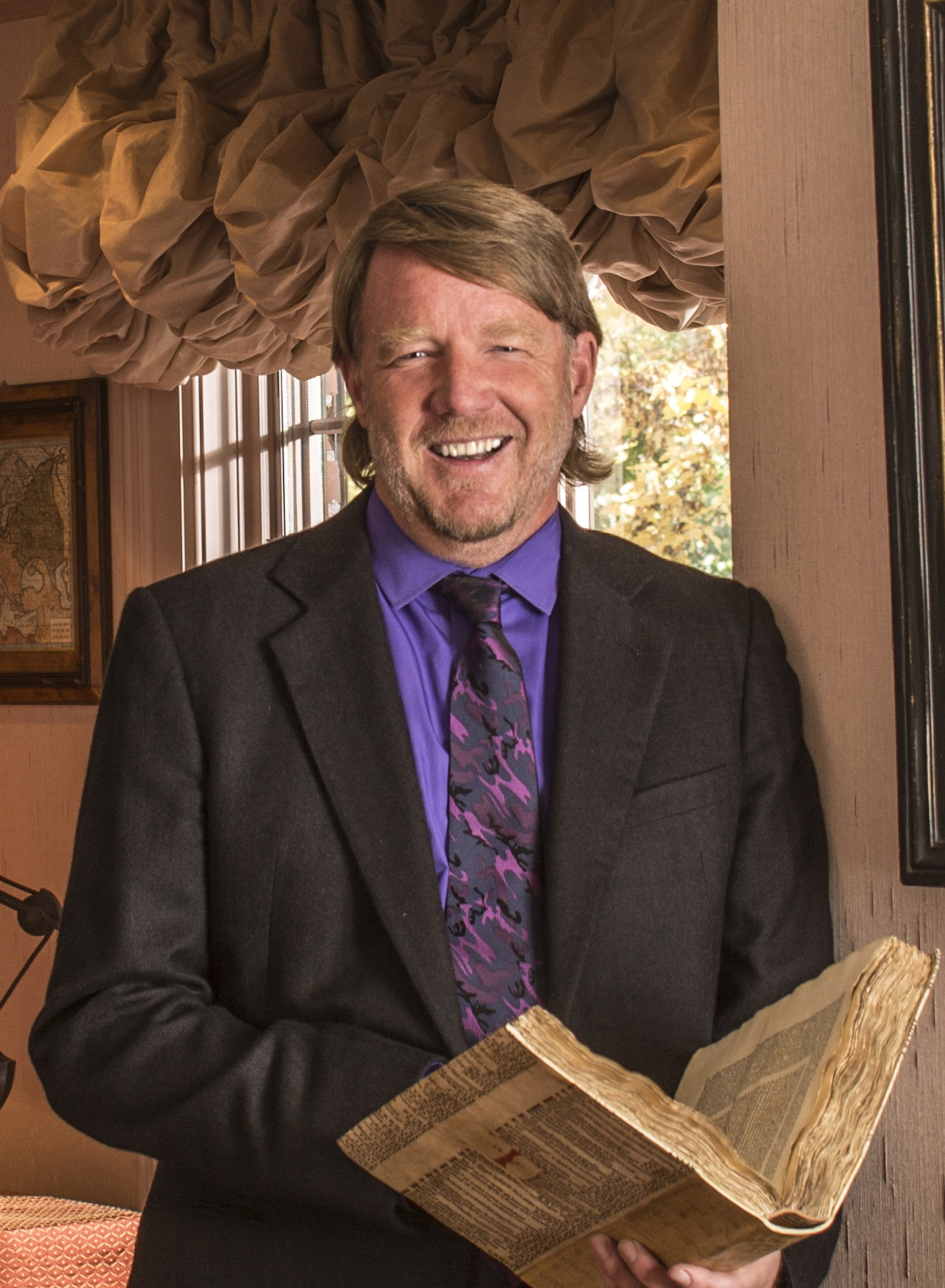
- Rasmussen in 2013
- Born: July 6, 1960 (age 66)
- Occupations: Academic, scholar, and author
- Spouse: Victoria Hines
- Awards: F. Donald Tibbitts Distinguished Teacher Award, University of Nevada; Three-time winner of the Falstaff Award for Best Shakespearean Publication of the Year; Book of the Year Awards from The Times Literary Supplement and History Today

Academic background
- Education: BA, English; MA, English; PhD, English
- Alma mater: Grinnell College; The University of Chicago

Eric Rasmussen (born 6 July 1960) is an American scholar, academic, and author. He is Regents Teaching Professor and Foundation Professor of English at the University of Nevada.

Rasmussen's scholarship is focused on the work of Shakespeare. He has authored numerous books and editions, including The Shakespeare Thefts: In Search of the First Folios (2011).

Rasmussen is the co-editor of the Royal Shakespeare Company’s Complete Works of William Shakespeare (2007) and The Norton Anthology of English Renaissance Drama (2002) as well as editions for the Arden Shakespeare, Oxford's World's Classics, the Revels Plays, the Malone Society, and The Cambridge Edition of the Works of Ben Jonson. His authentication of a newly-discovered Shakespeare First Folio in 2014 garnered a lot of attention, in the wake of which The Washington Post called him "the Robert Langdon of the Shakespearean world".

Rasmussen is a general editor of The New Variorum Shakespeare and The Stanford Global Shakespeare Encyclopedia. He has served on the board of trustees of the Shakespeare Association of America and on the Council of the Malone Society. Rasmussen wrote the annual review of editions and textual studies for Cambridge University Press's Shakespeare Survey from 1999 to 2010.

== Education ==
Rasmussen graduated with honors in English from Grinnell College in 1982. He then studied Renaissance Literature and Textual Studies at the University of Chicago and received his Master's and Doctoral degrees in 1983 and 1990, respectively.

== Career ==
Rasmussen held a brief visiting appointment at the University of Tulsa before joining the University of Nevada's Department of English as an assistant professor in 1994. He was promoted to associate professor in 1996, and to Professor in 2003. In 2013, he was appointed as a Foundation Professor of English. In 2008, he was appointed Chair of the English Department at the university, a position he held until 2018 when he was appointed Interim Chair of the Department of Philosophy.

== Research ==
Rasmussen's scholarship is focused on the work of Shakespeare. He has authored and edited numerous books revolving around Shakespeare and English Renaissance literature. His earliest publications, the Revels Plays edition of Christopher Marlowe's Doctor Faustus, co-edited with David Bevington, and A Textual Companion to Doctor Faustus appeared in the early 1990s. The latter was reviewed by Colin Wilcockson, who noted that "Rasmussen demonstrates the reversibility of many arguments about original text/memorial construction."

=== Complete Works of William Shakespeare ===
Rasmussen, along with Sir Jonathan Bate edited the Royal Shakespeare Company's Complete Works of William Shakespeare, which was published in 2007. A review in The New York Times observed that "two eminent Shakespeareans, Jonathan Bate and Eric Rasmussen, have applied modern editing techniques and recent scholarship to correct and update the First Folio". According to a review in The Guardian, "thanks to Bate and Rasmussen, we now have a rendering of The Complete Works that, in a rare publishing achievement, would also give complete satisfaction to the author himself". The edition received the Falstaff Award for Best Shakespearean Publication of the Year in 2007 and was translated into Chinese.

The book also gathered various mixed reviews including one in Shakespeare Quarterly stating that the "claims made about the project, with respect to both the text and the RSC, are not persuasive. In the end, the whole enterprise is less exciting and less exacting than it might have been”.

=== The Shakespeare Thefts: In Search of the First Folios ===
In 2011, Rasmussen published his book The Shakespeare Thefts: In Search of the First Folios, which was reviewed as "light and lively" and "a highly accessible read". According to Eleanor Brown, "you don’t have to be a Shakespeare fan or a rare book expert to enjoy The Shakespeare Thefts: In Search of the First Folios". Another review stated that "the author also provides a terrific appendix, which readers should not skip, that tells how Elizabethans printed books and how the First Folio came to be." According to Jeremy Dibbell, "the idea behind The Shakespeare Thefts—to profile stolen copies of the First Folio—is a fantastic one, and Rasmussen is at his best when doing just that".

=== William Shakespeare & Others: Collaborative Plays ===
Rasmussen co-edited William Shakespeare & Others: Collaborative Plays' with Sir Jonathan Bate, which was published in 2013. The book was the recipient of Falstaff Award for Best Shakespearean Publication of the Year in 2013 and gathered various reviews. According to Diana E. Henderson from MIT, "the volume in its entirety is valuable for its provocations and perceptions as well as the collected plays therein" and that "Rasmussen's modern-spelling editions will help plays such as the once wildly popular Mucedorus gain a new readership".

A review in Australian Book Review stated that "this view of Shakespeare as a remote and solitary genius scarcely matches the known evidence". Rasmussen's book has also been reviewed by The Wall Street Journal and The Washington Post.

=== Studying Shakespeare’s Contemporaries: A Guide to the Major Plays of the Renaissance ===
In 2014, Rasmussen along with Lars Engle published the book, Studying Shakespeare's Contemporaries: A Guide to the Major Plays of the Renaissance. According to Michael D. Bristol, "Studying Shakespeare's Contemporaries explores many of the anthologized plays in broader thematic contexts that correlate nicely with the state of the art in contemporary Shakespeare interpretation and criticism".

== Awards and honors ==
- 1997-1999 - National Endowment for the Humanities Research Grant for the New Variorum Hamlet Project
- 2004 - Alan Bible Award for Excellence in Teaching, College of Liberal Arts, University of Nevada
- 2007 - Falstaff Award for Best Shakespearean Publication of the Year for The Royal Shakespeare Company’s Complete Works of William Shakespeare
- 2010 - F. Donald Tibbitts Distinguished Teacher Award, University of Nevada
- 2011 - Nevada Regents' Teaching Award, Nevada System of Higher Education
- 2012 - Falstaff Award for "Best Book, Publication, or Recording of the Year for The Shakespeare First Folios: A Descriptive Catalogue
- 2013 - Falstaff Award for Best Shakespearean Publication of the Year for William Shakespeare & Others: Collaborative Plays

== Bibliography ==
=== Selected books ===
- Doctor Faustus: A- And B- Texts (1993) ISBN 978-0-7190-1643-1
- The Royal Shakespeare Company’s Complete Works of William Shakespeare (2007) ISBN 978-0-230-00351-4
- Everyman and Mankind (2009) ISBN 978-1-4081-1946-4
- The Shakespeare Thefts: In Search of the First Folios (2011) ISBN 978-0-230-34120-3
- The Shakespeare First Folios: A Descriptive Catalogue (2012) ISBN 978-0-230-36034-1
- William Shakespeare and Others: Collaborative Plays (The RSC Shakespeare) (2013) ISBN 978-1-137-27144-0
- Studying Shakespeare’s Contemporaries: A Guide to the Major Plays of the Renaissance (2014) ISBN 978-1-4051-3244-2

=== Selected articles ===
- Rasmussen, E. (2017). Who edited the Shakespeare First Folio?. Cahiers Élisabéthains, 93(1), 70-76.
- Rasmussen, E. (2004). Gilded monuments and living records: A note on critical editions in print and online. Early Modern Literary Studies, 9(3), 09-3.
- Rasmussen, E. (2001). The Date of Q4" Hamlet". The Papers of the Bibliographical Society of America, 95(1), 21–29.
- Rasmussen, E. (1993). Rehabilitating the A-Text of Marlowe's" Doctor Faustus". Studies in Bibliography, 46, 221–238.
- Rasmussen, E. (1991). Setting down what the clown spoke: improvisation, Hand B, and The Book of Sir Thomas More. The Library, 6(2), 126–136.
