= The Oxford Shakespeare =

Editions of William Shakespeare's works produced by Oxford University Press

Cover of the 2nd edition of the complete works

The Oxford Shakespeare is the range of editions of William Shakespeare's works produced by Oxford University Press. The Oxford Shakespeare is produced under the general editorship of Stanley Wells and Gary Taylor.

== Precursor ==
Oxford University Press first published a complete works of Shakespeare in 1891. Entitled The Complete Works, it was a single-volume modern-spelling edition edited by William James Craig. This 1891 text is not directly related to the series known as the Oxford Shakespeare today, which is freshly re-edited.

== The Complete Works ==
The Oxford Shakespeare, which includes a Complete Works edited by John Jowett, William Montgomery, Gary Taylor and Stanley Wells, appeared in 1986. It includes all of Shakespeare's plays and poems, as well as a biographical introduction. Each work is given a single-page introduction. There are no explanatory notes, but there is a glossary at the back of the book. Two related books accompany the main volume: William Shakespeare: A Textual Companion provides comprehensive data on editorial choices for scholars of the plays, and William Shakespeare: An Old-Spelling Edition presents the plays in their original spelling.

The Oxford Complete Works differs from other Shakespeare editions in attempting to present the text as it was first performed, rather than as it was first printed. This resulted in many controversial choices: for example, presenting Hamlet with several famous speeches relegated to appendices on the grounds that Shakespeare added them after the original performances; presenting two separate texts of King Lear due to the drastic differences between the two extant texts; and changing the name of Falstaff in Henry IV Part One to "Oldcastle" due to historical evidence that this name was used in the first performances even though it never survived to print.

The Oxford Complete Works was the first to emphasize Shakespeare's collaborative work, describing Macbeth, Measure for Measure and Timon of Athens as either collaborations with or revisions by Thomas Middleton; Pericles as a collaboration with George Wilkins; Henry VI Part One as a collaboration with several unknown other dramatists; and Henry VIII and The Two Noble Kinsmen as collaborations with John Fletcher. It also broke with tradition in presenting Shakespeare's works in chronological order, rather than dividing them by genre.

In 2005, a second edition of the Complete Works was produced. It adds a full text of Sir Thomas More (edited by John Jowett), which may contain passages by Shakespeare, and Edward III (edited by William Montgomery), another play believed to be partly by Shakespeare.

The first two editions of the Norton Shakespeare, published by W.W. Norton, were largely based on the Oxford text, but departed from some of its decisions.

== Individual plays ==
The Oxford edition of Timon of Athens

The term "Oxford Shakespeare" also refers to Oxford University Press's editions of individual Shakespeare plays and poems. These individual editions follow the same principles as the Complete Works, but their editors are permitted to reject choices made for the Complete Works if they feel strongly; for example, David Bevington's edition of Henry IV Part One uses "Falstaff" not "Oldcastle". The hardback editions feature distinctive purple dustjackets, while the paperbacks follow the design of the Oxford World's Classics editions of classic literature.

The editions were published as follows:

- Henry V (1982), ed. Gary Taylor
- The Taming of The Shrew (1982), ed. H. J. Oliver
- Troilus and Cressida (1982), ed. Kenneth Muir
- Titus Andronicus (1984), ed. Eugene M. Waith
- Julius Caesar (1984), ed. Arthur Humphreys
- Hamlet (1987), G. R. Hibbard
- Henry IV, Part 1 (1987), ed. David Bevington
- The Tempest (1987), ed. Stephen Orgel
- The Two Noble Kinsmen (1989), ed. Eugene M. Waith
- King John (1989), ed. A. R. Braunmuller
- Love's Labour's Lost (1990), ed. G. R. Hibbard
- Macbeth (1990), ed. Nicholas Brooke
- The Merry Wives of Windsor (1990), ed. T. W. Craik
- Measure for Measure (1991), ed. N. W. Bawcutt
- All's Well That Ends Well (1993), ed. Susan Snyder
- As You Like It (1993), ed. Alan Brissenden
- Much Ado About Nothing (1993), ed. Sheldon P. Zitner
- The Merchant of Venice (1993), ed. Jay L. Halio
- Antony and Cleopatra (1994), ed. Michael Neill
- Coriolanus (1994), ed. R. B. Parker
- Twelfth Night (1994), eds. Roger Warren & Stanley Wells
- A Midsummer Night's Dream (1995), ed. Peter Holland
- The Winter's Tale (1996), ed. Stephen Orgel
- Henry IV, Part 2 (1998), ed. René Weis
- Cymbeline (1998), ed. Roger Warren
- King Henry VIII, or All is True (1999), ed. Jay L. Halio
- Romeo and Juliet (2000), ed. Jill L. Levenson
- The History of King Lear (2000), ed. Stanley Wells
- Richard III (2000), ed. John Jowett
- Henry VI, Part 3 (2001), ed. Randall Martin
- The Complete Sonnets and Poems (2002), ed. Colin Burrow
- Henry VI, Part 2 (2002), ed. Roger Warren
- The Comedy of Errors (2002), ed. Charles Whitworth
- Henry VI, Part 1 (2003), ed. Michael Taylor
- Pericles (2004), ed. Roger Warren
- Timon of Athens (2004), ed. John Jowett
- Othello (2006), ed. Michael Neill
- The Two Gentlemen of Verona (2008), ed. Roger Warren
- Richard II (2011), eds. Anthony B. Dawson & Paul Yachnin

With the publication of Richard II in August 2011, the canonical plays are complete, the only two plays remaining from the one-play-per-volume edition being Edward III and Sir Thomas More.

== See also ==
- The Cambridge Shakespeare
