= Agnes Latham =

British academic (1905-1996)

- Born: Agnes Mary Christabel Latham; 31 January 1905
- Died: 13 January 1996 (aged 90); Pickering, North Yorkshire

Academic background
- Education: Wakefield Girls' High School; Somerville College, Oxford

Academic work
- Institutions: Bedford College, London

Agnes Mary Christabel Latham (31 January 1905 – 13 January 1996) was a British academic and Reader in English at Bedford College. She is remembered for her lifelong project of editing the letters of Sir Walter Raleigh and for her edition of As You Like It for the Arden Shakespeare.

== Early life ==
Latham was the middle of three daughters of Harry Latham and Francis Marian Latham. She studied at Wakefield Girls' High School, and later received a scholarship to Somerville College, Oxford. She graduated with a first class English Literature and Language degree in 1926.

== Career ==
In 1929 she published her edition of the poems of Sir Walter Raleigh. Her research was completed within a year, funded by a grant from Wakefield Girls' High School.

After a period of school teaching, she obtained a post of lecturing in English at Bedford College, London in 1939 but was suspended until 1946 because of the outbreak of World War II. At Bedford, her lectures focused on English language and syntax. She was appointed a reader in English at Bedford in 1958.

Her project of editing Sir Walter Raleigh's letters gained her international recognition. Between then and her retirement in 1973, she gained a readership and engaged in teachings of Shakespeare and Milton in 1958. During this time she was frequently reviewing anonymously for The Times Literary Supplement. Her edition of Raleigh's letters was published in 1999 by University of Exeter Press, her work having been completed by Joyce Youings, Emeritus Professor of History at the University of Exeter.

Latham is perhaps best known for her edition of As You Like It for the Arden Shakespeare which was published subsequent to her retirement in 1975. It was considered "impressive not only for its weight of scholarly insight but also for its careful consideration of the readers need to be persuaded to share her prestigious knowledge of the Renaissance period and its values the better to appreciate the power of the text as drama".

== Personal life ==
Latham was friends with the novelist Bryher during World War II. She joined the Communist Party of Great Britain in her late twenties as it was the only way for her to see certain films in Russian and German.

== Publications ==
- Shakespeare, William, ed. Angles Latham, As you like it: The Arden Shakespeare. Methuem publishing, 22 May 1975
- Latham, Agnes M. C. Sir Walter Ralegh. London: Longmans, Green, 1964
- Raleigh, Walter, and Agnes Mary Christabel. LATHAM. The Poems of Sir Walter Ralegh. Edited with an introduction by Agnes M.C. Latham. Pp. lxiii. 182. *Routledge & Kegan Paul: London, 1951
- Ralegh, Walter, and Agnes M. C. Latham. Selected Prose and Poetry. University of London: Athlone Press, 1965
- Raleigh, Walter, Agnes M. C. Latham, and Joyce A. Youings. The letters of Sir Walter Ralegh. Exeter: U of Exeter Press, 1999
- Raleigh, Walter ed. Latham, Agnes. The poems. Constable, London 1929
