= E. A. J. Honigmann =

Scholar of English literature

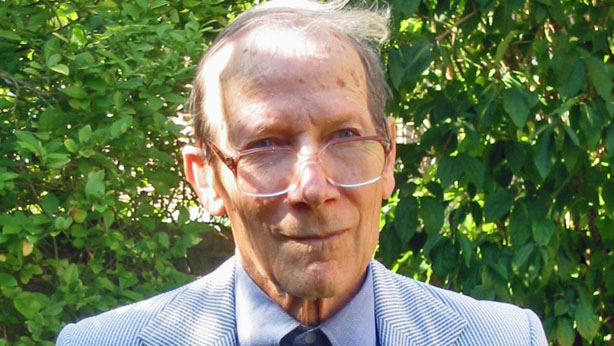
- Born: 29 November 1927; Breslau, Germany (now Wrocław, Poland)
- Died: 18 July 2011 (aged 83); Newcastle upon Tyne, United Kingdom
- Occupations: Academic, Author, English Literature, Shakespeare

Academic background
- Education: University of Glasgow; Merton College, Oxford

Ernst Anselm Joachim Honigmann, FBA (29 November 1927 – 18 July 2011) was a German-born British scholar of English Literature, Shakespeare scholar, and Fellow of the British Academy.

== Early life ==
Born in Breslau, Germany (now Wrocław, Poland), Ernst Honigmann arrived in England in 1935, age 7, as a Jewish refugee from Nazi Germany, together with his father, the zoologist Dr Hans D. S. Honigmann (who was removed from his job as head of zoology due to his religion) (Director of Breslau Zoo), mother, Ursula, and brothers, Friederich and Paul.

== Education and career ==
Honigmann attended Hillhead High School (Glasgow). He took his first degree in English Literature at the University of Glasgow 1944-48. He gained his BLitt working on a study of the chronology of Shakespeare's plays, under the supervision of J. C. Maxwell, at Merton College, Oxford 1948-50.

Honigmann was one of the three founder Fellows of the Shakespeare Institute (University of Birmingham) in Stratford-upon-Avon, where he worked from 1951 to 1954. He gained his Doctor of Letters after returning to the University of Glasgow from 1954 to 1967, where he was lecturer in English alongside Peter Alexander, his former teacher. In 1968 Honigmann became reader and two years later Joseph Cowen Professor of English Literature at Newcastle University (also holding the position of leader of the English Department for 20 years), until his retirement from active University life in 1989, whereupon he was appointed emeritus professor. Honigmann was also elected to the Fellowship of the British Academy in 1989.

Honigmann authored and edited many books and papers, annotated editions of texts, and was a General Editor of the Revels Plays & Revels Plays Companion Library from 1976 to 2000. His classic texts remain relevant, and have been reprinted many times.

Honigmann continued to write after his retirement with his last paper being published posthumously. In retirement he worked both independently and on several collaborations in Shakespeare studies, created a new edition of Othello for the Arden Shakespeare, wrote a personal memoir Togetherness: Episodes from the Life of a Refugee, and created poetry and short stories (the latter mainly for the amusement of his grandchildren).

== Major publications ==
=== Books ===
- The Stability of Shakespeare's Text (Edward Arnold, 1965)
- Shakespearian Tragedy and the Mixed Response Inaugural lecture (University of Newcastle, 1971)
- Shakespeare: Seven Tragedies - The Dramatist's Manipulation of Response (Macmillan, 1976; Palgrave 2002)
- Shakespeare's Mingled Yarn and 'Measure for Measure' (OUP, 1981)
- Shakespeare's Impact on his Contemporaries (Macmillan, 1982)
- Shakespeare: The Lost Years (Manchester University Press, 1985)
- Shakespeare and his Contemporaries: Essays in comparison (Ed.) (Revels Plays Companion Library, 1986)
- John Weever: a biography of a literary associate of Shakespeare and Jonson, together with a photographic facsimile of Weever's 'Epigrammes' (Manchester University Press, 1987)
- Myriad-minded Shakespeare: Essays chiefly on the Tragedies and Problem Comedies (Macmillan, 1989)
- Playhouse Wills, 1558-1642 with Susan Brock (Revels Plays Companion Library, 1993)
- British Academy Shakespeare Lectures, 1980-89 (Ed.) (British Academy, OUP, 1993)
- The Texts of Othello and Shakespearian Revision (Routledge, 1996)

=== Editions ===
- King John (Arden Shakespeare, 1954)
- Milton's Sonnets (Macmillan, 1966)
- King Richard the Third (New Penguin Shakespeare, 1968)
- Twelfth Night, or What You Will (The Macmillan Shakespeare, 1971)
- Paradise Lost, Book X with C. A. Patrides (The Macmillan Milton, 1972)
- Othello (Arden Shakespeare, 1997, 3rd edn 2001)

== Other publications ==
- Togetherness: episodes from the life of a refugee by E. A. J. Honigmann
- Catholic Shakespeare? A response to Hildegard Hammerschmidt-Hummel by E. A. J. Honigmann
- Contributions by E. A. J. Honigmann to The New York Review of Books
