= Roy Ridley =

British writer and poet (1890 –1969)

Portrait of Maurice Roy Ridley

Maurice Roy Ridley (25 January 1890 – 12 June 1969), known professionally as M. R. Ridley, was a writer and poet, and a Fellow and Chaplain of Balliol College, Oxford.

== Early life ==
Ridley was the son of William Dawson Ridley, a Church of England clergyman, Rector of Orcheston St Mary, Wiltshire, and his wife Jane Elizabeth Rutherford. He was educated at Clifton College, Bristol, and Balliol College, Oxford.

His grandfather, Thomas Dawson Ridley, a civil engineer from Coatham, Yorkshire, died in 1898, leaving a substantial fortune. His father died in 1899 in Bordighera.

== Career ==
From 1920 to 1945, Ridley was a Fellow and Tutor of Balliol. He spent 1930–1931 as a visiting professor at Bowdoin College under the auspices of the Tallman Foundation. He was a lecturer at Bedford College, University of London, from 1948, where he earned a Doctorate of Humane Letters.

On 23 September 1922, he married Katherine Scott in Cleveland, Ohio.

== In popular culture ==
Dorothy L. Sayers based the physical description of her character Lord Peter Wimsey (the archetypal British gentleman detective) on that of Ridley after seeing him read his Newdigate Prize-winning poem "Oxford" at the Encaenia ceremony in July 1913.

== Awards ==
- Newdigate Prize, 1913

== Works ==
- Keats' Craftsmanship: A Study in Poetic Development. Oxford: Clarendon. 1933.
- Sir Gawain and the Green Knight. Leicester: Edmund Ward. 1944.
- Studies in Three Literatures. English, Latin, Greek. Contrasts and Comparisons. London: Dent. 1962. ISBN 0313201897.
- Shakespeare's Plays: A Commentary.
- Abraham Lincoln.
- On Reading Shakespeare.
