= Kenneth Muir (scholar) =

20th-century English literary scholar and author

Kenneth Arthur Muir (5 May 1907 – 30 September 1996) was a literary scholar and writer, prominent in the fields of Shakespeare studies and English Renaissance theatre. He served as King Alfred Professor of English Literature at Liverpool University from 1951 to 1974.

Muir edited volumes 19 through 33 of the Shakespeare Survey, and served as chairman of the International Shakespeare Association. He authored and edited a wide range of scholarly articles and books – primarily on Shakespeare and other Elizabethans, but also on various other subjects, including John Keats, Jean Racine, and Pedro Calderon de la Barca. He edited modern texts of many classic plays of the English Renaissance, including Othello, King Lear, Macbeth, Troilus and Cressida, and Richard II. He also edited the collected poems of Sir Thomas Wyatt.

Muir is vulnerable to confusion with other authors with very similar names: John Kenneth Muir, Kenneth B. Muir, Kenneth R. Muir, and Kenneth W. Muir.

== Selected works of Kenneth Muir ==
- Elizabethan Lyrics: A Critical Anthology (1952)
- John Milton (1955)
- Elizabethan and Jacobean Prose 1550-1620 (1956)
- Jean Racine (1960)
- Shakespeare as Collaborator (1960)
- Last Periods of Shakespeare, Racine, Ibsen (1961)
- The Voyage to Illyria (1970) with Sean O'Loughlin
- A New Companion to Shakespeare Studies (1971) with Samuel Schoenbaum
- The Sources of Shakespeare's Plays (1977)
- Shakespeare's Sonnets (1979)
- Shakespeare's Tragic Sequence (1979)
- Shakespeare's Plays in Quarto (1981) with Michael J. B. Allen
- Macbeth (1951, 1984) Arden Second Series
- Aspects of Macbeth (1977) edited with Philip Edwards
- The Singularity of Shakespeare (1977)
