= Othello (Theatre Night) =

- Theatre Night episode
- Episode no.: Series 5 Episode 1
- Directed by: Trevor Nunn
- Written by: Trevor Nunn
- Based on: Othello by William Shakespeare
- Original air date: June 23, 1990
- Running time: 205

Episode chronology
← Previous "Benefactors"	Next → "Bingo"

Othello is a 1990 film produced by the Royal Shakespeare Company, starring Ian McKellen, Willard White, Imogen Stubbs, and Zoë Wanamaker. It is based on a stage production of William Shakespeare's play Othello, directed by Trevor Nunn, and later rethought for TV and filmed in a studio. It was shot in a black box theater, so minimal props or scenery were needed, and aired 23 June 1990 on Theatre Night.

== Cast ==
- Ian McKellen as Iago
- Willard White as Othello
- Imogen Stubbs as Desdemona
- Zoë Wanamaker as Emilia
- Michael Grandage as Roderigo
- Clive Swift as Brabantio / Gratiano
- John Burgess as Duke of Venice / Lodovico
- Marsha Hunt as Bianca

== Production ==
Trevor Nunn directed the film himself based on his 1989 production for the Royal Shakespeare Company. The sets, costumes, and props are from the American Civil War, but the dialogue remains tied to Venice and Cyprus. In contrast with Antony and Cleopatra (1974) and Macbeth (1979), Nunn preferred "contemplative" medium shots over extreme closeups. The film makes little attempt to hide that it is a filmed stage production. Michael Brooke, writing for BFI Screenonline, thinks this is because Nunn's state purpose was to preserve the stage production for posterity. The film presents almost the complete text of the play, leaving out just one scene with Cassio and the clown.

== Reception ==
The previous film adaptation of a Nunn stage production for the Royal Shakespeare Company of a Shakespeare play, Macbeth (1979), was "widely regarded as one of the finest screen Shakespeares ever", so expectations for this adaptation were "sky-high". Brooke thinks the expectations were "… generally met by a production that holds a very distinguished place amongst filmed Othellos, and is arguably its most successful television translation." He particularly calls out "the beautifully achieved chemistry between the four leads" as among its strongest features.

In the Cambridge Companion to Shakespeare on Film, Carol Chillington Rutter finds a feminist perspective in the film:

… this is the one Othello where the women's stories get fully told. Imogen Stubb's girlish, impulsive, incandescent Desdemona is set against [Zoë] Wanamaker's watchful, damaged Emilia …. Her nuanced playing … establishes Emilia as one of Shakespeare's great tragic roles. When, roaring, Wanamaker defies Othello … and breaks free of her collusion with Iago's lies … the voice Emilia acquires seems to be the voice of women's history. Here is a role that claims the agency that eludes Ophelia, Gertrude, Desdemona.
