= Othello (2001 film) =

2001 British television film

- Created by: Andrew Davies; William Shakespeare (Based on the play Othello)
- Directed by: Geoffrey Sax
- Starring: Eamonn Walker; Christopher Eccleston; Keeley Hawes
- Theme music composer: Debbie Wiseman
- Country of origin: United Kingdom
- Original language: English

Production
- Producers: Julie Gardner; Anne Pivcevic; Michele Buck; Jo Wright; Ian Strachan
- Running time: 100 minutes
- Production companies: LWT; WGBH Productions

Original release
- Network: ITV
- Release: 23 December 2001

Othello is a 2001 British television film starring Eamonn Walker, Christopher Eccleston and Keeley Hawes. It is an adaptation in modern English of William Shakespeare's play Othello. It was scripted by Andrew Davies and directed by Geoffrey Sax.

== Plot ==
The film is narrated by Ben Jago, a corrupt police detective who is prepared to manipulate those around him to get what he wants, even the people he loves.

After the Commissioner of London's Metropolitan Police Sinclair Carver is caught using racist language he is forced to resign. The Home Secretary and Prime Minister choose John Othello, a black policeman, to be the next Commissioner as a publicity stunt after a reporter praises him for ending a riot. Jago, Carver's second-in-command, feels that Othello stole his chance to become Commissioner himself, as he had been the favourite for the job. Jago plots to take revenge on Othello by ruining his life and driving him out of his new job.

Jago posts on a neo-Nazi website about Othello's marriage to Dessie Brabant, a wealthy white woman, leading her to be attacked in the street. When Othello asks Jago to lend him a man to look after her during the day Jago suggests Michael Cass, an attractive inspector and known womanizer, to look after Dessie. Jago also seduces Dessie's best friend, Lulu, to try to get information about Dessie's past and her relationship with Cass.

During this time, Othello has Jago look into the death of Billy Coates, a black drug addict, who was battered to death by three policemen claiming it was self-defense. He discovers, via PC Alan Roderick, that the three policemen actually went to Coates' flat with the intention of attacking him. Jago sympathises with Roderick and offers protection in return for him testifying against the other three policemen. Upon discovering this Othello is given all the credit. Furious that he has once again been overlooked by Othello, Jago decides to ruin the case. Roderick is called to give evidence at the trial causing the other policemen to rebuff him. The day he is called to trial he is found dead from an overdose, and it is suggested that Jago overdosed Roderick with alcohol, knowing he was on anti-depressants. Jago offers to take the blame, but Othello refuses, telling him that he is the "only person [he] can trust."

Through Jago's prompting and several misunderstandings between Dessie and Cass, Othello begins to become paranoid that Dessie is having an affair. Jago suggests they use DNA to test whether Dessie and Cass have had sex. During a televised interview Othello has a breakdown and even attacks Cass in a car park. Jago starts to feel guilty, but decides that it is out of his hands. Nonetheless he tells Othello that he got the DNA tests back, confirming that Dessie is having an affair.

That night Othello returns home to confront her. When Dessie denies it Othello kills her (via smothering) in a fit of anger. Worried when they don't get a response at the door, Jago and Lulu break into the flat to find Dessie dead. Jago tells Othello that the tests were negative and Dessie was innocent. Realising that he had been manipulated, Othello asks Jago why he did it, and Jago says that Othello took what was his; despite everything, however, Jago states that he still loves Othello and always will.

Jago and Lulu wait outside for the police to arrive when Othello commits suicide. Shortly after the Home Secretary and Prime Minister decide to choose a more reliable pair of hands for the Commissioner, choosing Jago.

The film ends with Jago stating that it wasn't about race or politics but love, "simple as that."

== Cast ==
Character in the play Othello	Character in Othello (2001)	Actor
Othello	John Othello	Eamonn Walker
Iago	Ben Jago	Christopher Eccleston
Desdemona	Dessie Brabant	Keeley Hawes
Michael Cassio	Michael Cass	Richard Coyle
Emilia	Lulu	Rachael Stirling
Roderigo	PC Alan Roderick	Del Synnott
Duke of Venice	Sinclair Carver	Bill Paterson
Brabantio	James Brabant	Joss Ackland

== Motives ==
The film adopts several of the suggested motives for Jago's actions. Firstly, is his failure to be promoted and jealousy over Othello's high position, which he feels should be his.

Finally, the film adopts a modern idea of the 21st century proposed at the time, inferring that the relationship between Othello and Iago is one of repressed homosexuality. Jago states that "It was about love, simple as that". This could be taken as a double meaning: 1.) Being the love between Othello and Dessie, and 2.) The repressed love Jago has for Othello. This is further hinted at by his refusal to let Lulu masturbate him during their foreplay, and his stating that "[He] loved [Othello] too".

== Reception ==
Daniel Rosenthal of The Observer gave a positive review, praising Davies' modern interpretation of the storyline, but criticizing the choice to rewrite the dialogue to give a modern feel.
