= Iago's manipulativeness and character =

Aspect of the character in Othello by Shakespeare

Iago is a major character in William Shakespeare's 1603 play Othello. His role is one of Othello's outwardly loyal courtier and friend, who in fact hates him and schemes his downfall. He also manipulates his friends and master into doing his bidding, eventually persuading Othello to believe that his wife, Desdemona, has been having an affair, resulting in Othello killing her in a jealous rage.

Iago's character and his techniques of illicit manipulation have fascinated scholars since the character's inception, as has his refusal to say why he seeks to destroy Othello.

== Background ==
Othello, a General in the Venetian army, promotes a young officer, Michael Cassio, enraging Iago—the General's ensign—who expected the post himself. Outwardly loyal to Othello and his recently married wife, Desdemona, Iago proceeds to cause dissension within Othello's camp (for instance, turning Othello's new father-in-law against him, and causing Cassio to fight another officer). Iago causes Othello to be increasingly suspicious of Desdemona and subtly encourages him to believe that Cassio and she are having an illicit affair.

== "Honest" Iago ==
Shakespeare uses variations on the word "honest" 51 times through the play. The word is used both as a noun and adjectivally, 26 times describing Iago. (Note: Specifically, Othello calls Iago honest 13 times, Iago self-describes as such 10 times, Cassio twice and Desdemona once.) Its first outing is at the close of Act I, when Othello places Desdemona under the ensign's care, saying "Honest Iago, / My Desdemona I leave to thee". Its repetition, argues J. W. Abernethy, emphasizes the quality that Iago can be least said to possess, and as such "constitutes a strain of irony running throughout the play". Analyzing critics' approaches to Iago's motives, Jane Adamson suggests that is often assumed the skills of a detective are required. Towards the end of the play Othello says of Iago, "an honest man he is, who hates the slime that sticks on filthy deeds" (V. ii. 147-149), even though by this point in the play the audience are well aware of Iago's malign influence.

== Character ==
The image that Iago projects to his peers is that of the common soldier, a man of the world: "unimpressed by fine emotions and super-subtle manners, a 'man's man', who cuts through to the nub of a matter, and preserves a firm self-sufficiency". Professor Felix Emanuel Schelling suggests that Iago is a "shameless egoist who proudly avows his villainy and bawls it to the gallery", his manipulation made possible with expressions of mock-sympathy. His description, early in the play, of the class of servant to which he does not belong, is that of the "knee crooking" subservients who wallow in their subserviency. Rather, he says, he is one of those who "shows of service on their lords / Do well thrive by them". Iago's approach is two-pronged. On the one hand, he is ever aware of when an opportunity presents itself—as he puts it, "the necessity of present life"—with watching his back and guarding against the future: what Adamson has called "opportunism and self-preservation". Seeing the world as "wholly manipulable", the keenness with which he protects his own exists contrasts with his disregard for others; similarly he shows no introspection or remorse.

Adamson notes that Shakespeare presents Iago to the audience as he is at that point in time, with no indication as to how he came to be who he is with the character traits he possesses, and likewise, Iago never gives any indication of anything in the past that has led him to his position. From the beginning, argues Adamson, Iago is a clear combination of self-righteousness and vindictiveness, illustrated with "casual brutality" in his speech with others. His one consistent quality, she suggests, is imperviousness: to morality, nuance and empathy particularly. She sums his outlook up as that of "an essentially simple mind, for whom life is correspondingly simple": the rules that others must live and abide by do not apply to him, and, likewise, the treatment he metes out to others he never has to face. (Note: Adamson contends that in his simplicity of outlook and expression, Iago shows traces of Lady Macbeth, who also, she says "saw the world at [her] disposal".) His view of the world is fundamentally a simple one, epitomized by complacency; he comments to Roderigo that to survive in the world, all a man needs is to "know how to love himself"; to others he is both unloving and unforgiving. These contradictions, argues Adamson, are the basis of his dramatic character and therefore his significance.

=== Manipulative behaviour ===
Virtue? A fig! 'Tis in ourselves that we are thus, or thus. Our bodies are our gardens, to the which our wills are gardeners. So that if we will plant nettles or sow lettuce, set hyssop and weed up thyme, supply it with one gender of herbs or distract it with many, either to have it sterile with idleness or manured with industry, why the power and corrigible authority of this lies in our wills.

— Iago to Roderigo, I iii, 313−319

It is easy for Iago to, as he puts it, toy with people "for sport and profit", and to which end he uses words as a slow poison. He explains to the audience in Act II scene iii that he plans to "pour this pestilence" into Othello's ear. Having laid the ground earlier in the play by suggesting to Cassio that Desdemona was prone to sexual flirtation, Iago's manipulative character is most visible in Act III scene iii where he persuades Othello that Desdemona may be being unfaithful to him, and which the General comes to believe was his own idea in the first place. Abernethy argues that even Othello's jealousy, from which the rest of the play's action stems, is not his own, but has been instilled in him by Iago. Iago sums up his philosophy as "play[ing] the god with [Othello's] weak function". Iago is also responsible, earlier in the play, for Cassio "psychologically losing his life"—by way of being dismissed from the military position he loves—and his self-respect. Iago achieves this through getting him drunk, and provoking a fight between him and Iago's henchman Roderigo; when Othello stops the fight and demands to know who started it, Iago puts the blame for the brawl on Cassio, who is too drunk to defend himself. Iago has a talent for persuading people of all classes and outlooks to listen to him, from lower class fools such as Roderigo, to the educated and upper-class Cassio and Othello. This is in part due to his moral simplicity, which, argues Adamson, "is always seductive to those whose lives are complicated and anguished". His are so obvious statements, she suggests, that they distract from and disguise his intentions and purpose. Iago's manipulative character is central to the play because of his

Unremitting efforts to deny or suppress the feelings that consume him, and to transform them into other feelings that might at once allow and justify a course of retributive action, instead of his having impotently to suffer fear, loss and self-disgust and negation.

==== Technique ====
In a world that the audience may perceive as highly trusting, as well as dignified and courteous, Iago demonstrates a "malign opportunism", argues Adamson, throughout the play responding to circumstance rather than a preconceived blueprint. However, he does have a technique, and in the cases of Roderigo, Brabantio and Cassio they are effectively the same attack. First, he offers hypocritical condolences for the men's unfortunate circumstance (Brabantio, whose daughter has eloped on Iago's urging, for example), and in doing so he highlights his own keenness to help. He then advises his target to "mend it for your own good", all the while playing individuals off against each other: other losses are calculable in the benefit they potentially have for him. By this, he enjoys a vicarious pleasure from the distresses of others. Following Iago's eventual discovery, Roderigo explains how Iago "set him on".

== Iago as hero ==
While Othello himself is strictly the main protagonist, if an anti-hero, Abernethy suggests that the real hero of the play is Iago himself. This is due to the fact that without him, there would be no story:

He maybe the "tragic hero", the real hero of the play is Iago. He is the centre of interest, the mainspring of the machine. He is the only character who exercises creative power and initiates movement in the plot; all other characters are his puppets, servants of his purposes, tools used in fabricating his diabolical schemes.

It is also the case, says Abernethy, that as a result of this his character is never advanced, being the same at his death from his first appearance. Unlike other Shakespearean protagonists—Macbeth and his wife, Brutus or Hamlet, for example—his behaviour advances the action rather than his character. (Note: Although it is dangerous, argues Adamson, to take the argument of Iago's sole culpability for the cation too far, as, she suggests, A. C. Bradley did, noting that "Bradley cannot bring himself to recognize that, psychologically and physically, Othello—and Othello alone—kills Desdemona".) W. H. Auden later echoed Abernethy's assessment, commenting how "any consideration of [the play] must be primarily occupied, not with its official hero, but with its villain". Justifying Iago's behaviour is not new, and goes back at least to 1796 when an anonymous essay—itself a "genuine oddity" in Shakespearean criticism—looked at the various possible causes: jealousy of Cassio, suspicion of his wife, for example, and ultimately argued that ""if vengeance can be vindicated by an accumulation of injuries, Iago's though exorbitant, was just". (Note: The article, although printed anonymously by the Exeter-based Society of Gentlemen, is known to have been composed by one Richard Hole (1746–1803), a clergyman, antiquarian and literary critic, who also published one of the first literary defences of The Merchant of Venice's Shylock.) Scholars William Baker and Brian Vickers have, however, suggested that since the essay appears to have been an "ironic apology for Iago, one wonders whether it was meant seriously". In 1955, Marvin Rosenberg charged that Iago's "wickedness" had been "libelled" by attempts to show that he was the victim of external forces, such as his earlier experiences or the influence of others; likewise, in arguing that Iago was personally, deliberately responsible for everything he did, he also disputes the suggestion that Iago was the victim of demonic possession.

== Iago as evil incarnate ==
Samuel Taylor Coleridge believed Iago to be "motiveless Malignity".

== Iago as psychopath ==
Some critics have characterized Iago as an example of someone with antisocial personality disorder; essayist Fred West wrote that Iago, who is "devoid of conscience, with no remorse", is "an accurate portrayal of a psychopath". English scholar Bella McGill wrote that Iago's willingness to harm others and exploit their weaknesses for his own gain – the chief example being his use of the innocent Desdemona to bait Othello's jealousy and provoke him into killing her – highlights Iago's psychopathy.

== Alternative arguments ==
Scholars do not universally applaud Iago as a nuanced character. F. R. Leavis, for example, questions whether he is not a "rather clumsy mechanism". Likewise, suggests Adamson, Iago's enemies in the play—Cassio and Othello—are both such open characters to him that Iago "hardly needs diabolical skill" to influence them. The former, for instance, willingly drinks with Iago, despite acknowledging at the start that alcohol affects him badly, as he has "poor and unhappy brains for drinking". Hence, she suggests, it is as likely that they fell, on account of their susceptibility, as much as they were pushed by Iago. He is not, argue both Bradley and Adamson, a symbol, or a two-dimensional representation of the notion of "inexplicable evil or Evil".

== Cultural influence ==
Iago was an influential character on the detective fiction writer Agatha Christie, who, says her biographer, was "obsessed" with him. In The Rose and the Yew Tree, written under Christie's pen name Mary Westmacott, her protagonist understands how Iago suffered, "hat[ing] the human being who's up amongst the stars". In her Curtain: Poirot's Last Case, Christie describes him as "the perfect murderer" because, like her own killer in that novel—himself based upon Iago—he manipulated others into killing at his behest.
