= Othello (1965 British film) =

1965 film by Stuart Burge

- Theatrical release poster
- Directed by: Stuart Burge
- Written by: William Shakespeare
- Produced by: Anthony Havelock-Allan; John Brabourne
- Starring: Laurence Olivier; Maggie Smith; Joyce Redman; Frank Finlay
- Cinematography: Geoffrey Unsworth
- Edited by: Richard Marden
- Music by: Richard Hampton
- Production companies: BHE Films; National Theatre of Great Britain
- Distributed by: Eagle-Lion Films (UK); Warner Bros. Pictures (US)
- Release date: 15 December 1965
- Running time: 165 minutes
- Country: United Kingdom
- Language: English

Othello is a 1965 film based on the National Theatre Company's staging of Shakespeare's Othello (1964–1966) staged by John Dexter. Directed by Stuart Burge, the film stars Laurence Olivier, Maggie Smith, Joyce Redman, and Frank Finlay, who all received Oscar nominations, and provided film debuts for both Derek Jacobi and Michael Gambon.

== Cast ==
- Laurence Olivier as Othello
- Maggie Smith as Desdemona
- Joyce Redman as Emilia
- Frank Finlay as Iago
- Derek Jacobi as Cassio
- Robert Lang as Roderigo
- Kenneth Mackintosh as Lodovico
- Anthony Nicholls as Brabantio
- Sheila Reid as Bianca
- Edward Hardwicke as Montano
- Michael Gambon as Senator/Soldier/Cypriot

== Background ==
The film retains most of Shakespeare's original play, and does not change the order of scenes, as do Olivier's Hamlet and Richard III. The only major omission is the Fool's scene, although other minor lines are cut here and there, though the stage version contained more of the play than the film. Derek Jacobi (Cassio) and Michael Gambon made their film debuts in Othello, while Edward Hardwicke (Montano) would go on to work with the National for seven years.

The film of Othello used enlarged duplicates of the original stage settings, rather than having elaborate new sets built. Olivier's former backers for his Shakespeare films were all deceased by 1965, and he was unable to raise the money to do a film version on location or on elaborate sets. Nearly a decade earlier, Olivier had been attempting to find financial backing for his own film version of Macbeth after he performed the role in 1955 at Stratford, but ultimately without success. The National Theatre Company had already produced a staged film of Chekhov's Uncle Vanya (1963) and would later produce Strindberg's The Dance of Death (1969). The Olivier Othello is the first English-language filmed version of the play made in colour (there had been a Russian version in colour in 1955) and widescreen. It was the second major film adaptation of the work after a production in 1952 by Orson Welles. In the U.S., it did not play the usual several-week run given to most films; instead, it played for only two days. The film was exhibited as a roadshow presentation.

Of all Olivier's Shakespeare films, Othello is the one with the least music. Iago and the soldiers sing a drinking song in one scene, and in another, musicians are seen playing briefly on exotic instruments, but, otherwise, the film has no music.

== Reception ==
Olivier played Othello in blackface, adopting an accent and walk of his own invention. Columnist Inez Robb disparagingly compared Olivier's performance to Al Jolson in The Jazz Singer. She described Olivier's performance as "high camp", and said "I was certainly in tune with the gentleman sitting next to me who kept asking 'When does he sing Mammy?" Film critic Pauline Kael gave the production and Olivier's portrayal one of her most glowing reviews, shaming the major movie studios for giving Olivier so little money to make the film that he and the public had to be content with what was almost literally a filmed stage production, while other films received multimillion-dollar budgets. John Simon, while disagreeing with the approach the production's interpretation took, declared that, "Olivier plays this misconceived Othello spectacularly, in a manner that is always a perverse joy to behold".

One particular thing which has caused distinctive amounts of offense, and a device which primarily works in film rather than on-stage, was Olivier's rolling of his eyes: a mannerism often shown in early depictions of black people in blackface films. This device specifically links to Al Jolson and is unconnected to any Shakespearean-era stage direction.

It remains the only Shakespeare film in which all the principals were nominated for Oscars. Finlay (Iago) was nominated for Best Supporting Actor despite having the role with the most lines in the play: 1117 to Olivier's 856. Olivier does, however, appear on screen three minutes longer than Finlay.

In 2021, music professor Bright Sheng resigned from teaching an undergraduate musical composition class at the University of Michigan because he had shown the movie to students, allegedly without giving a warning that it contained blackface. Sheng said he had intended to show how Giuseppe Verdi adapted Shakespeare's Othello into his opera Otello.

== See also ==
- Shakespeare on screen
- 1965 in film
