= Othello (1951 film) =

1951 film by Orson Welles

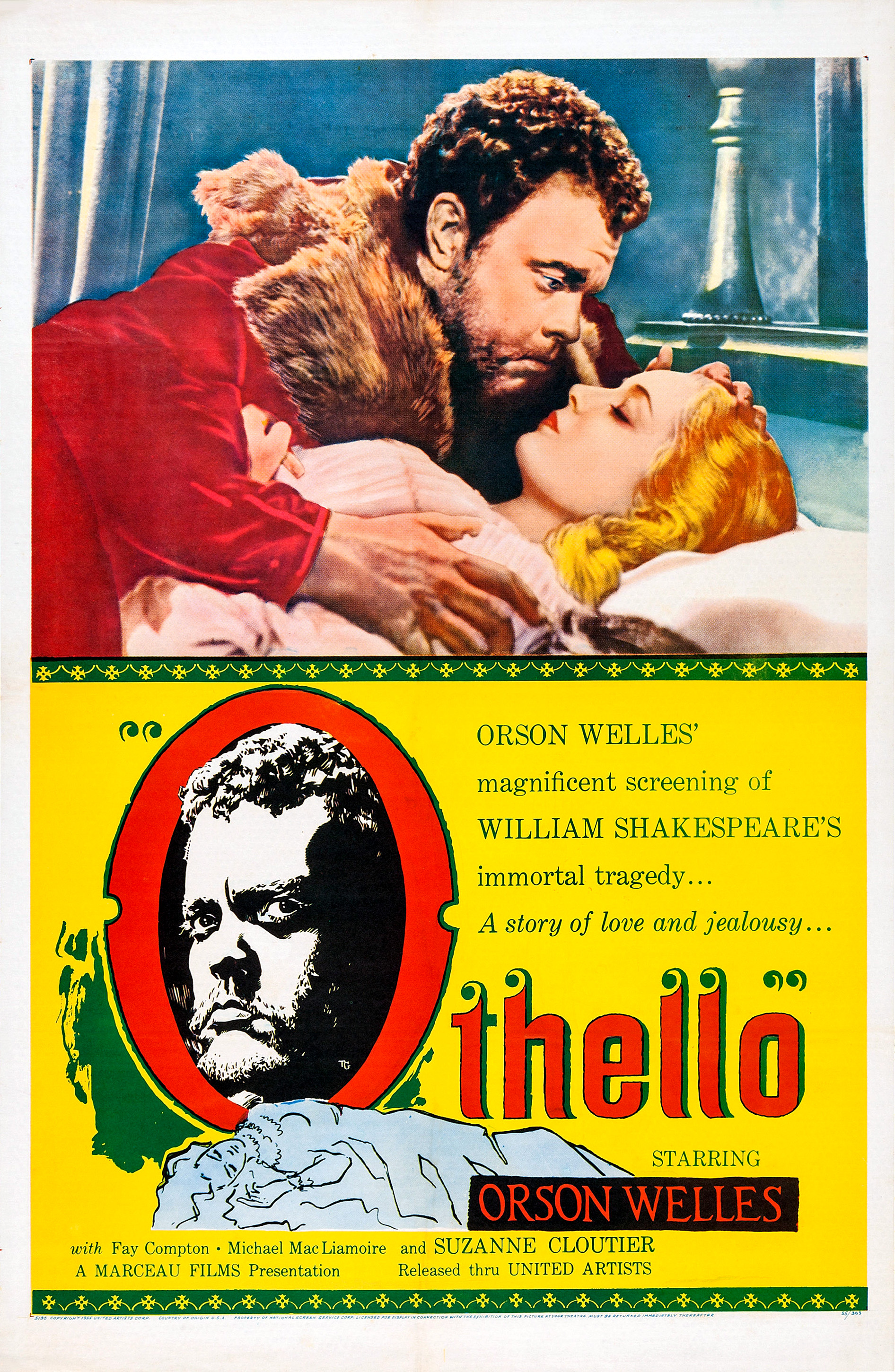
- U.S. theatrical release poster (1955)
- Directed by: Orson Welles
- Screenplay by: Orson Welles
- Based on: Othello (1603 play) by William Shakespeare
- Produced by: Orson Welles
- Starring: Orson Welles; Micheál Mac Liammóir; Suzanne Cloutier; Robert Coote
- Cinematography: Anchise Brizzi; G. R. Aldo; George Fanto
- Edited by: Jenő Csepreghy; Jean Sacha; Renzo Lucidi; William Morton
- Music by: Angelo Francesco Lavagnino; Alberto Barberis
- Distributed by: Marceau Films; United Artists
- Release date: 29 November 1951
- Running time: 93 minutes
- Countries: Italy; Morocco
- Language: English
- Box office: 1,047,035 admissions (France)

Othello (also known as The Tragedy of Othello: The Moor of Venice) is a 1951 tragedy film based on the Shakespearean play, written, directed, produced by, and starring Orson Welles. The film also stars Micheál Mac Liammóir as Iago (one of his only starring film roles), Robert Coote as Roderigo, Suzanne Cloutier as Desdemona, Michael Laurence as Cassio, Fay Compton as Emilia and Doris Dowling as Bianca.

Othello was filmed on location over a three-year period in Morocco, Venice, Tuscany and Rome as well as at the Scalera Studios in Rome. Recipient of the Grand Prix du Festival International du Film (precursory name for the Palme d'Or) at the 1952 Cannes Film Festival, the film was distributed by United Artists when it was released in the United States in 1955. Three different versions of the film have seen theatrical release — two supervised by Welles and a 1992 restoration supervised by his daughter Beatrice Welles.

== Plot ==
The film closely follows the plot of the play, but restructures and reorders individual scenes. Welles trimmed the source material, which is generally around three hours when performed, to a little over 90 minutes for the film. The opening funeral scene is not in the original play.

The movie opens with Othello and Desdemona's funeral.

The first main scene shows Iago's complaining to Roderigo about not being advised of the marriage between Othello and Desdemona. Roderigo is contemplating killing himself but Iago says “Ere I would say I would drown myself for the love of a guinea hen, I would change my humanity with a baboon,” meaning Iago would rather be a baboon than kill himself over a woman. Iago further says "Put but money in thy purse" and urges Roderigo to sell all his lands and give the money to Iago, who will use it to convince Desdemona to have sex.

Desdemona's father Brabantio is furious about the marriage after being told of it by Iago and Roderigo. Brabantio accuses Othello of bewitching his daughter. Othello convinces Brabantio that it was not witchcraft but rather by his tragic tales.

By planting a handkerchief, Iago convinces Othello that Desdemona is having an affair with Cassio. Othello previously promoted Cassio to lieutenant over Iago, hence Iago's jealousy.

Othello strangles Desdemona. Iago knifes Emilia to death as she protests Desdemona's innocence. Othello realises his mistake, and kills himself.

== Cast (in order of appearance) ==
- Micheál Mac Liammóir as Iago
- Suzanne Cloutier as Desdemona
- Orson Welles as Othello
- Robert Coote as Roderigo
- Hilton Edwards as Brabantio
- Michael Laurence as Cassio
- Fay Compton as Emilia
- Nicholas Bruce as Lodovico
- Jean Davis as Montano
- Doris Dowling as Bianca

In the 1955 version of the film, Cloutier was re-dubbed by Gudrun Ure.

== Production ==
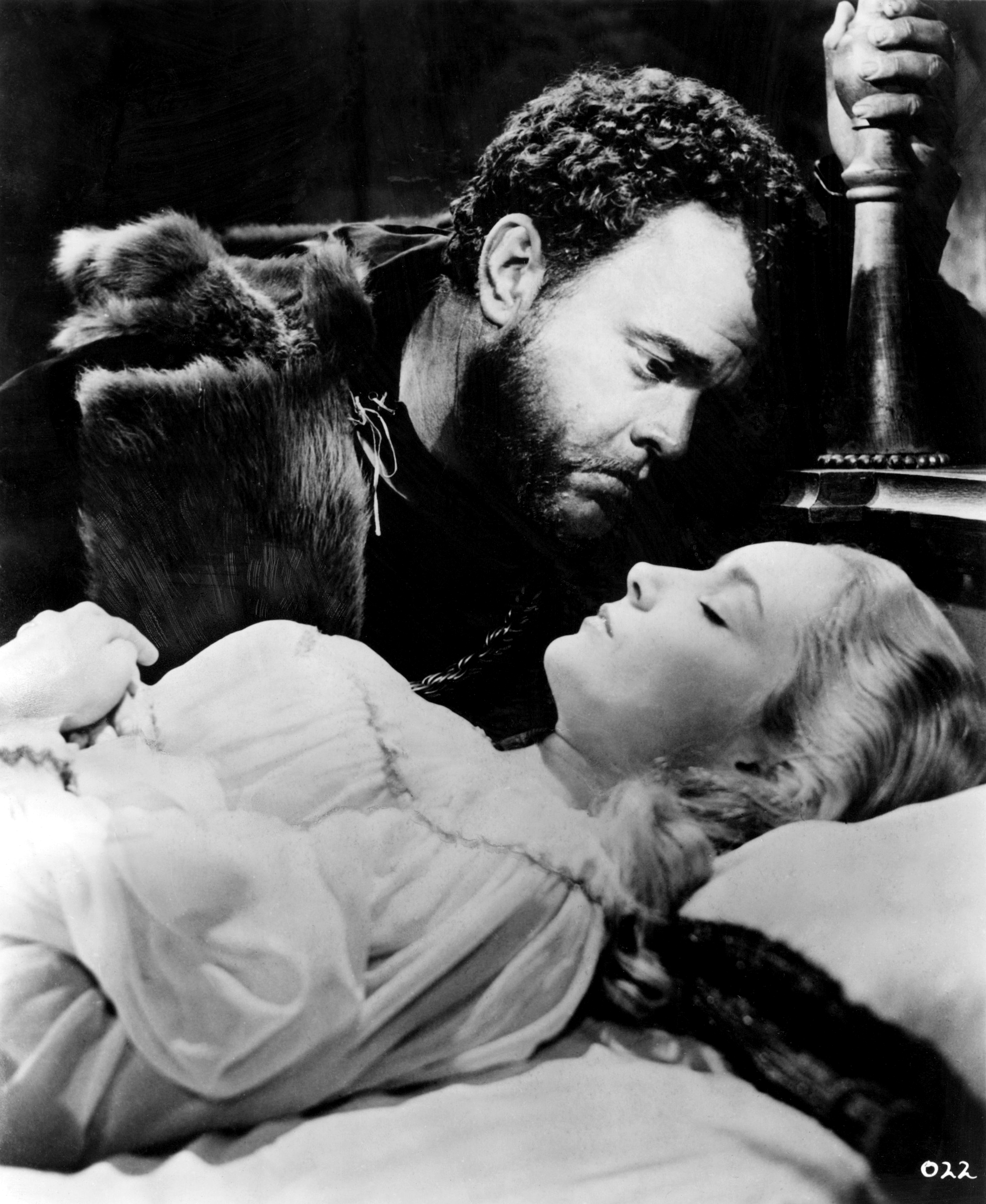
Orson Welles and Suzanne Cloutier in Othello

One of Welles's more complicated shoots, Othello was filmed erratically over three years. Shooting began in 1949, but was forced to shut down when the film's original Italian producer announced on one of the first days of shooting that he was bankrupt. Instead of abandoning filming altogether, Welles as director began pouring his own money into the project. When he ran out of money as well, he needed to stop filming for months at a time to raise money, mostly by taking part in other productions. Because of lack of funds, production was stopped at least three times. The film found some imaginative solutions to a range of logistical problems; the scene in which Roderigo is murdered in a Turkish bath was shot in that form because the original costumes were impounded and using replacements would have meant a delay. One of the fight scenes starts in Morocco, but the ending was shot in Rome several months later. Welles used the money from his acting roles, such as in The Third Man (1949), to help finance the film, but this often involved pausing filming for several months while he went off to raise money; these pauses were further complicated by the shifting availability of different actors, which meant that some key parts (like Desdemona) had to be recast, and whole scenes then reshot. This lengthy shoot is detailed in Micheál MacLiammóir's book Put Money in Thy Purse.

When Welles acted in the 1950 film The Black Rose, he insisted that the coat his character, Bayan, wore be lined with mink, even though it would not be visible. Despite the expense, the producers agreed to his request. At the end of filming, the coat disappeared, but could subsequently be seen in Othello with the fur lining exposed.

Welles was reportedly extremely satisfied with the film's musical score by Angelo Francesco Lavagnino, and Lavagnino again provided the musical scores of Welles's two subsequent Shakespearean films: Chimes at Midnight (1965) and The Merchant of Venice (1969).

== Release ==
An Italian-language version of Othello premiered in Rome, Italy on 29 November 1951. Welles's English-language version premiered at the Cannes Film Festival on 10 May 1952, and went on general release in Europe. Unlike that of the subsequent American cut, the soundtrack was generally without flaws, apart from some dubbing that was slightly out of sync. It features different edits of many scenes from the other two versions, with alternative camera angles used. A print remains stored in the Paris Cinematheque.

Welles supervised a different version of Othello for the American market, a 93-minute cut released on 12 September 1955 in New York City. This had a number of minor editing and several major soundtrack changes, including Welles's replacement of his spoken-word titles with written credits (requested by the film's distributor, United Artists) and the addition of a narration by Welles. Suzanne Cloutier's entire performance was dubbed by Gudrun Ure, who had previously played Desdemona opposite Welles in a 1951 theatre production of Othello that was staged to raise funds to complete the film. Paul Squitieri, in a 1993 PhD study of the film in its various forms, argues that the U.S. version represents a "compromise", with some of the changes forced on Welles, and that the original European cut represents the truest version. A Criterion LaserDisc of this version came out in 1994, but was withdrawn from sale after legal action by Welles's daughter, Beatrice Welles.

Welles featured Othello clips in his 1978 Filming Othello, but these had all been completely reedited by him for the documentary, and so do not appear in the original film in the same form. The clips were accompanied by a voiceover from Welles, so that no part of the original soundtrack was heard in Filming Othello.

=== Critical reception ===
Released in Europe to acclaim in 1952, Othello won the Grand Prix du Festival International du Film (Note: The Grand Prix du Festival International du Film was the original award granted by the Cannes Film Festival during its early years. Grand Prix du Festival International du Film changed its name to Palme d'Or in 1955.) at the Cannes Film Festival under the Moroccan flag. Welles could not find the film a distributor in the United States for over three years, and even after its U.S. release it was largely ignored.

Film critic Pauline Kael suggested that the film was not so much of a movie or theatrical experience but tended towards a more faithful record of a stage production.

The film was re-released to theaters in a 1992 restoration that screened "out of competition" at the 1992 Cannes Film Festival and was shown to acclaim in the United States although the sound restoration would subsequently be criticized.

=== 1992 restoration ===
In 1992, Beatrice Welles-Smith, daughter of Orson Welles, supervised a restoration of the film, which saw over $1,000,000 spent on improving the picture quality, resynchronizing the audio, adding extra sound effects, and completely rerecording the music in stereo. Although the restoration was greeted with positive reviews upon its release, it subsequently came under attack for numerous technical flaws and alterations. Further alterations were made between the restoration's theatrical release and its home media release, after complaints that the opening scene lacked the Gregorian chanting it had previously had, and another scene was missing entirely. This is the only version which has been available on VHS and DVD since the mid-1990s, since legal action by Beatrice Welles has blocked either version released by Orson Welles from being sold. This version runs to 91 minutes.

Multiple film historians criticized the restoration work. Jonathan Rosenbaum argued that numerous changes were made against Welles's intent and that the restoration was incompetent, having used as its source an original distribution print with a flawed soundtrack. In fact, the visual elements of the 1992 restoration utilized a fine-grain master positive — discovered in a storage facility in New Jersey — as its source, not a distribution print. The audio came from a distribution print that was resynchronized, virtually syllable by syllable, by the restoration team to match the master positive. As some voice parts had music underneath, the newly recorded music and effects track had to match whatever music was underneath the dialogue, leading to inconsistencies. The flaw in the American cut's soundtrack is how white noise is audible in the background throughout dialogue and music, but that the noise cuts out when there is no action—meaning the white noise is more noticeable whenever it returns. The restoration sought to minimize this problem, but it is still present in places. By contrast, the white noise problem is not present to begin with in Welles's original 1952 European cut.

Rosenbaum makes several charges of incompetence on the restoration team's part, including that the restoration team were unaware of the European cut's existence, and instead based their work on the American cut which was farther from Welles's original vision. The team recut the order of entire scenes to make the dialogue match. One scene was inexplicably missing from the cinema release, but restored for the video/DVD release. The opening scene, in cinema release, was lacking the important Gregorian chanting, but this was restored for the DVD. The soundtrack attracted particular criticism. Instead of consulting the papers of composer Angelo Francesco Lavagnino, where a full copy of the score survives, the restorers chose to transcribe the music from the poor-quality audio of the print they had, with numerous mistakes having been made — Lavagnino's son has gone so far as to argue the new score is so different it is no longer his father's work. The new score was also recorded with arguably less impressive resources than the original version—although Welles only used a single microphone for a monaural soundtrack, he had 40 mandolins playing in his version, while the new stereo soundtrack used three. Further, Rosenbaum states that by refusing to give permission for her father's version to be shown or released, Beatrice Welles "effectively made her father’s version of the film (as well as, more indirectly, his final feature Filming Othello) illegal, so that she can make more money on her own version", since she only receives royalties on the version which she restored. Many of these criticisms have been subsequently echoed by other scholars such as David Impastato and Michael Anderegg.

Anderegg particularly criticizes the bold claims made by the restorers at the time of the film's 1992 release, including Beatrice Welles's statements "This is a film that no one has seen", that it was a "lost film", and that it was "never given a theatrical release" (all of which are untrue), and he dismisses as hyperbolic the judgment of film restorer Michael Dawson that Welles's original dubbing was like "Japanese sci-fi." Instead, Anderegg argues that Othello was simply seldom screened. Jonathan Rosenbaum has defended the out-of-synchronization dubbing of some lines in Welles's original version, pointing out it was typical of European films of the early 1950s, and likening modern attempts to resynchronize it to the proposed colorisation of Citizen Kane.

In 2014 Carlotta Films U.S. released a 2K digital restoration of the 1992 version on D.C.P. This digital version premiered in Dallas at the 2014 USA Film Festival, and subsequently played in other cities on the art-house circuit. The New Yorker reported that the monaural soundtrack was a great improvement on the previous version of the restoration — "much more appropriate for a low-budget, black-and-white 1952 release."

=== Home media ===
On 26 September 2017, The Criterion Collection released both the European and 1955 US versions of Othello on Blu-ray and DVD. Special features include the short film Return to Glennascaul (1951); audio commentary by Peter Bogdanovich and Myron Meisel; and interviews with Simon Callow, Joseph McBride, François Thomas and Ayanna Thompson.

== See also ==
- List of films shot over three or more years
