= Emilia (Othello) =

Character in Othello

- Othello character
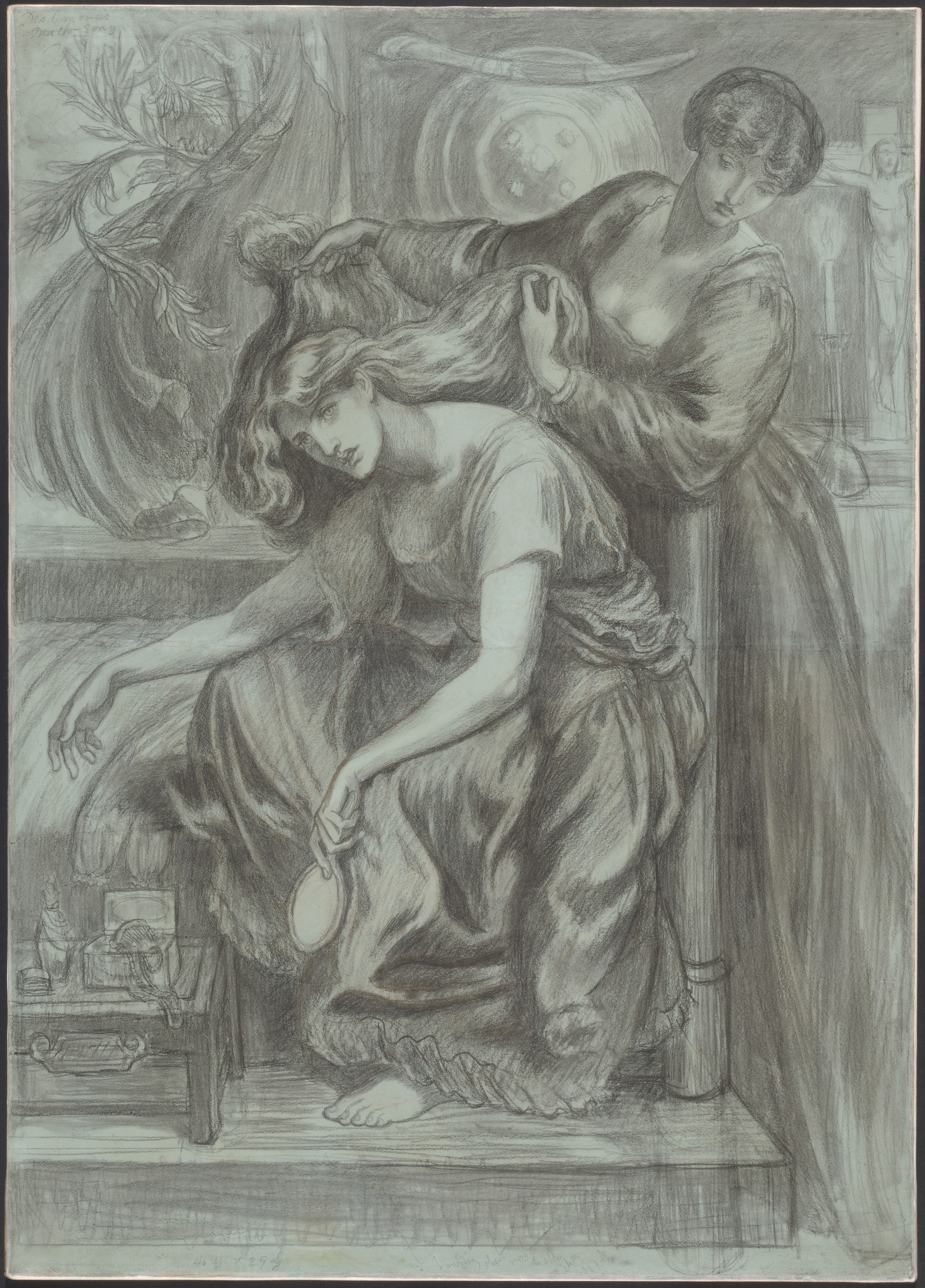
- Desdemona's Death Song by Dante Gabriel Rossetti
- Created by: William Shakespeare
- Portrayed by: Fay Compton (1952) Joyce Redman (1965) Anna Patrick (1995) Rain Phoenix (2001)

In-universe information
- Spouse: Iago Othello

Emilia is a fictional character in Shakespeare's Othello (c. 1601-1604). She is married to Othello's ensign Iago, and is a maidservant, friend, and unofficial advisor to Othello's wife, Desdemona. She encourages Desdemona to defend Cassio when Desdemona is accused of sleeping with him. When Emilia exposes Iago's duplicity, he kills her.

== Role in Othello ==
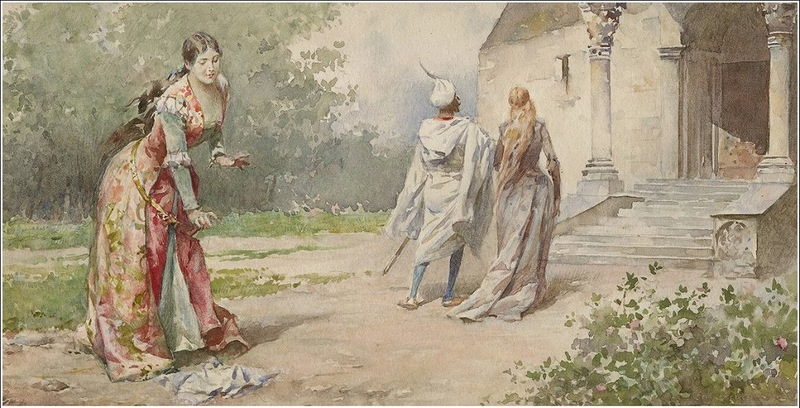
Drawing by Ludovico Marchetti

Emilia first appears on stage in 2.1 when she arrives in Cyprus with Iago, Desdemona, and Roderigo. Upon hearing about the rumor that Emilia had an affair with Othello, Iago resolves that Emilia should "move for Cassio to her mistress" at the end of 2.3.

In 3.1, Cassio asks Emilia to allow him to privately confer with Desdemona, which she does. She finds Desdemona's handkerchief in 3.1 and gives it to Iago, who swears her to secrecy. Despite her involvement in the handkerchief's disappearance, she comforts Desdemona when Othello becomes enraged after discovering that it is missing in 3.4.

In 4.2 when questioned by Othello, she firmly states Desdemona's innocence. In 4.3 she later discusses with Desdemona their differing views on marriage and fidelity. Emilia states she would commit adultery if it gained her husband the world and also asserts that husbands are to blame, arguing for equality and mutual respect in marriage. She briefly appears in 5.1 where she verbally abuses Bianca after hearing of her supposed involvement in Cassio's attack. In 5.2 she informs Othello of Roderigo's death and the attempted murder of Cassio. She calls for help and Iago, Montano and Gratiano appear. Emilia, having heard from Othello that Iago told him of Desdemona "cheating" on him with Cassio, accuses him of gross dishonesty leading to an unjust murder. When she hears about the handkerchief, she reveals her role and Iago threatens and then kills her at the first opportunity. She then dies singing Desdemona's song and speaking of her purity and love for Othello, lying alongside her mistress.

== Critical reception ==
There is debate among critics as to Emilia's character nature in Othello, with some deeming her a villain and some as the true hero of the play. This is because her allegiances initially seem to lie with her husband, and she displays the typical “wifely virtues of silence, obedience, and prudence" of the Elizabethan period (as seen in her theft of the handkerchief in 3.1). Some, such as Bradley, see her as an innately good character who strives for the truth. Yet later she seems more outspoken and appears to maintain a more progressive, even modern feminist view on Elizabethan attitudes towards marriage, as seen in her speech in 4.3. This has caused different critical interpretations, with some critics viewing her as a backstabber who does not care for Desdemona, with similar deceptive qualities to Iago, whilst others see her as a victim of society and a strong female character in her own right.

== Emilia on film ==
Emilia was portrayed by Fay Compton in Orson Welles' Othello, released in 1952, by Joyce Redman in Stuart Burge's 1965 film, and by Anna Patrick in Oliver Parker's 1995 film. Emilia, renamed Emily, was portrayed by Rain Phoenix in the modernized-adaptation O. In the critically acclaimed Vishal Bhardwaj's version of Othello, Omkara, the character of Indu which was similar to Emilia was portrayed by Konkona Sen Sharma, earning her the Filmfare Best Supporting Actress Award as well as the National Award for Best Supporting Actress.
