= Race-reversed casting =

Type of casting in acting

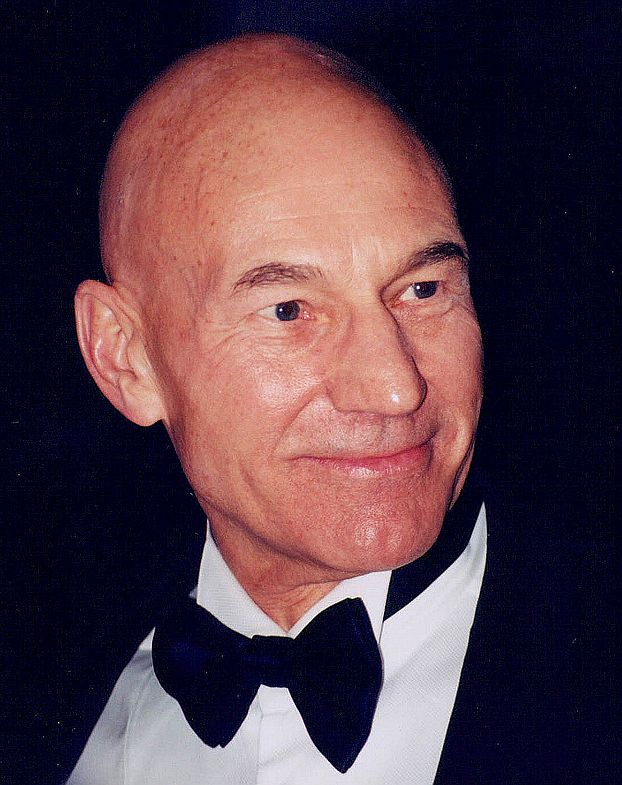
Sir Patrick Stewart, inventor of photo negative casting

Race-reversed casting, also called photo negative casting, is a form of non-traditional casting in acting. The concept revolves around reversing the race of characters being played (white characters being played by black actors and vice versa). The concept was intended as a way to open up non-traditional character roles to more actors but has received complaints that it waters down racial differences.

== History ==
The concept of race-reversed casting was invented by the British actor Sir Patrick Stewart in 1997. As a classically trained Shakespearean actor, Stewart had wanted to play the titular character in Othello but stated that when he got to the point in his career where he felt he was experienced enough to play it, it had become no longer socially acceptable for white actors to put on blackface to play the role. Stewart stated "one day, thinking about the play, a notion occurred to me, what if we keep the racial element of the play but we just switch it over" and came up with a concept which would later be called "photo negative" casting. This technique involved reversing the skin colour of the characters, so that the majority of the characters would be black, while Othello, Bianca, Montano and the servants would be white; thus he would be able to play Othello. This was also done with the intention of continuing to broaden a view of racial prejudice, as the original lines and racial language in the script were not changed from the source material.

Stewart, when playing Othello, said he always paused after he said the line "Haply, for I am black" because he felt if anyone was going to voice an objection to the photo negative concept, that would be the place they would do it. Some reviewers claimed that some non-regular theatre-goers "snickered" when that line was said. The concept would be later picked up by the Shakespeare's Globe Theatre Company, who would put on a performance of Antony and Cleopatra using race-reversed casting in 1999. Race-reversed casting occurred again in 2014 for a performance of Death of a Salesman in Philadelphia, United States.

== Reaction ==
The concept was controversial as the National Theatre Company and the Royal Shakespeare Company in the United Kingdom rejected Stewart's concept, believing it was too sensitive. In the United States, only the National Theatre in Washington, D.C. would take up the concept after Stewart told the theatre director "I want to be in a racially reversed Othello". Two black actors originally cast in Othello almost walked out, as they felt the race-reversed casting offensive, but the director Jude Kelly persuaded them to remain. Theatre critics felt that race-reversed casting resulted in a neutralisation of the play's racial themes.

However, the concept has been praised for allowing actors to play characters that would have otherwise been unavailable to them. It has also been praised for focusing on the social dynamics of how minorities can be isolated by whoever is in the majority. Others cite it as an example to demonstrate how flexible and adaptable Shakespeare is in interpretation.

== See also ==
- Anti-racism
- Blind audition
- Color-blind casting
