= Othello (1995 film) =

- Theatrical Release Poster
- Directed by: Oliver Parker
- Screenplay by: Oliver Parker
- Based on: Othello by William Shakespeare
- Produced by: Luc Roeg; David Barron
- Starring: Laurence Fishburne; Irène Jacob; Kenneth Branagh
- Cinematography: David Johnson
- Edited by: Tony Lawson
- Music by: Charlie Mole
- Production companies: Columbia Pictures; Castle Rock Entertainment; Dakota Films; Imminent Films
- Distributed by: Sony Pictures Releasing (Select territories); Rank-Castle Rock/Turner (United Kingdom)
- Release date: December 15, 1995
- Running time: 123 minutes
- Countries: United Kingdom; United States
- Language: English
- Budget: $11 million
- Box office: $2.8 million (United States)

Othello is a 1995 drama film based on William Shakespeare's tragedy of the same name. It was directed by Oliver Parker and stars Laurence Fishburne as Othello, Irène Jacob as Desdemona, and Kenneth Branagh as Iago. This is the first cinematic reproduction of the play released by a major studio that casts an African American actor to play the role of Othello, although low-budget independent films of the play starring Ted Lange and Yaphet Kotto predated it.

== Plot ==
Othello, a Moor who has married a young Venetian gentlewoman, Desdemona, is sent to repel a Turkish invasion attempt on the island of Cyprus. During the battle, he was accompanied by his faithful lieutenant, Cassio. When Othello arrives at Cyprus, he finds that the Turkish invasion fleet has been wrecked by a storm. Reunited with Desdemona, who has volunteered to go with him, Othello leads his men and the people of Cyprus in a celebration.

Iago, Othello's trusted companion and ensign, envies Othello's prosperous life, Cassio's lieutenancy—and suspicious that Othello has slept with his own wife, Emilia, plans to ruin both, first by getting Cassio fired and replacing him, and then by manipulating Othello into believing that Desdemona is having an affair with Cassio. He arouses Othello's suspicion and jealousy gradually and then plants Desdemona's handkerchief in Cassio's room. When Othello finds out about the handkerchief, he is convinced of Desdemona's infidelity and in a rage, decides to kill her and have Cassio assassinated by Iago.

Othello smothers Desdemona, who dies just as Emilia enters the bedroom, but Cassio is only wounded by Iago's stooge, Roderigo. When Iago is confronted, Emilia tells Othello the truth behind Iago's lies and he realizes what he has done. The authorities and Othello turn on Iago and after a running fight, capture him. In despair, Othello stabs and wounds Iago, then kills himself. Iago is taken away to be tortured and executed.

== Cast ==
- Laurence Fishburne as Othello
- Irène Jacob as Desdemona
- Kenneth Branagh as Iago
- Nathaniel Parker as Cassio
- Michael Maloney as Roderigo
- Anna Patrick as Emilia
- Nicholas Farrell as Montano
- Indra Ové as Bianca
- Michael Sheen as Lodovico
- Gabriele Ferzetti as Doge of Venice

== Reception ==
The film received largely positive reviews, especially for Branagh's Iago. Branagh was nominated for a Screen Actors Guild Award for his performance. Janet Maslin of The New York Times wrote: "Mr. Branagh's superb performance, as the man whose Machiavellian scheming guides the story of Othello's downfall, guarantees this film an immediacy that any audience will understand. ... Mr. Fishburne's performance has a dangerous edge that ultimately works to its advantage, and he smolders movingly through the most anguished parts of the role. ... Anna Patrick is particularly transfixing in the role of Emilia, Iago's wife and Desdemona's servant, who scathingly articulates some of the play's feminist undercurrents."

As of November 2024, the film holds a rating of 68% on Rotten Tomatoes based on 41 reviews with the consensus: "Perhaps less than the sum of its parts, Othello is still highly entertaining and features excellent performances from Laurence Fishburne and Kenneth Branagh."
