= Brabantio =

Character in Shakespeare's Othello

- Othello character
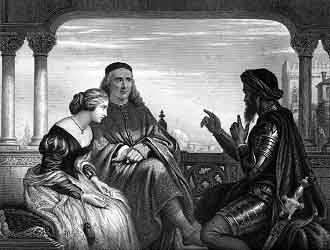
- Brabantio with Desdemona and Othello in a steel engraving of a painting by Charles West Cope, (1873)
- Created by: William Shakespeare
- Portrayed by: Friedrich Kühne (1922); Hilton Edwards (1952); Anthony Nicholls (1965); Pierre Vaneck (1995); Brian Protheroe (2015); Lewis MacInnes (2015)

In-universe information
- Family: Desdemona, daughter; Othello, son-in-law; Ludovico and Gratiano, kinsmen

Brabantio (sometimes called Brabanzio) is a character in William Shakespeare's Othello (c. 1601–1604). He is a Venetian senator and the father of Desdemona.

Brabantio makes his first appearance in 1.1 when Iago and Roderigo rouse him with the news that Desdemona has eloped. In 1.2, Brabantio is led to the Sagittary, where the newlyweds are found and there accuses Othello of using magic to bewitch his daughter. In 1.3, he brings Othello to trial before the Duke and once again accuses him of using witchcraft upon his daughter. When Desdemona arrives, she tells her father that she respects him only because they are related, and that Othello is whom she truly loves. Brabantio grudgingly accepts what she says, but not without complaining to the senators in an attempt at having Othello stripped of his title; when this is unsuccessful, he disowns his daughter.

Film interpreters of the role include Friedrich Kühne in the 1922 silent version starring Emil Jannings, Hilton Edwards in Orson Welles' 1952 film, Anthony Nicholls in Laurence Olivier's 1965 film, and Pierre Vaneck in the 1995 film starring Laurence Fishburne.

== Bibliography ==
- Bevington, David and William Shakespeare. Four Tragedies. Bantam, 1988.
