= Suzanne Cloutier =

Canadian actress (1923–2003)

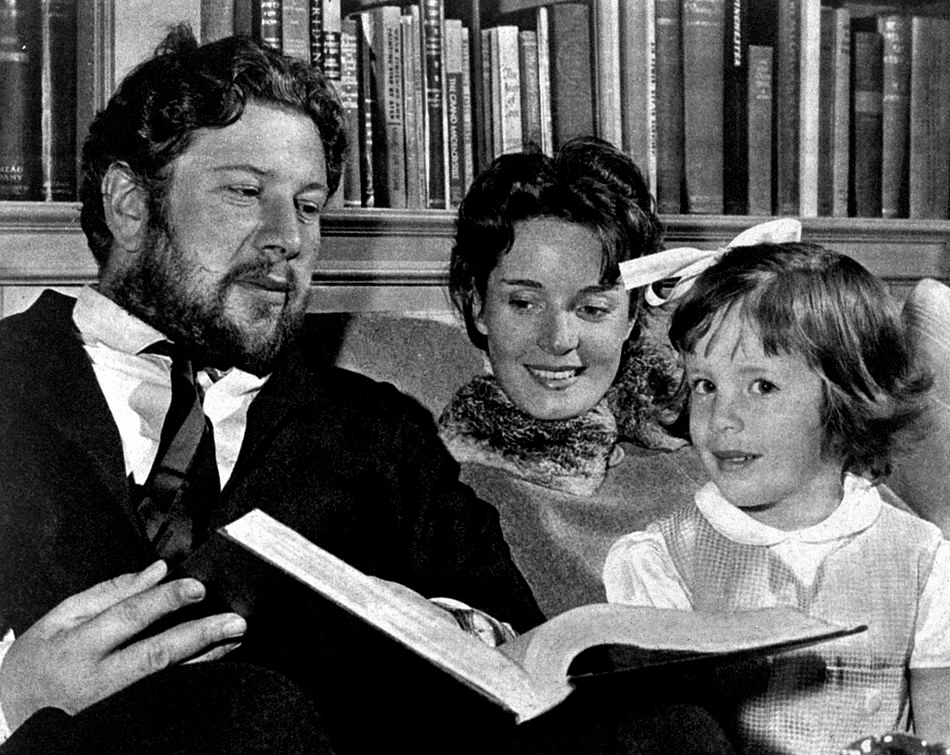
- Cloutier with Peter Ustinov and daughter
- Born: July 10, 1923; Ottawa, Ontario, Canada
- Died: December 2, 2003 (aged 80); Montreal, Quebec, Canada
- Occupation: Actress
- Spouse: Peter Ustinov (m. 1954; div. 1971)
- Children: 3

Suzanne Cloutier (July 10, 1923 – December 2, 2003) was a Canadian film actress.

== Biography ==
Cloutier was the daughter and one of six children of Edmond Cloutier, the King's Printer for Canada in Ottawa, and Hélène Saint-Denis, who wed on May 23, 1922. She escaped an early unconsummated marriage to become an actress, first with Charles Laughton in New York and then the Comédie Française. She appeared in films by Julien Duvivier and Marcel Carné, starred as Desdemona in Orson Welles' film version of Othello (1951) and appeared in Doctor in the House (1954, the hit of the year in Britain).

=== Marriage ===
She had acted earlier in London in a play by Peter Ustinov, and the two married in 1954. They had three children, Andrea, Igor and Pavla, and Cloutier appeared in the film of his stage hit Romanoff and Juliet. The couple divorced in 1971, when Cloutier reconnected with Orson Welles, then at work on films never finished. Cloutier later resettled in Los Angeles, and eventually in Montreal, Canada, in 1988.

=== Death ===
Cloutier appears to have been born in Ottawa on July 10, 1923, and died of liver cancer in Montreal on December 2, 2003, aged 80.

== Filmography ==
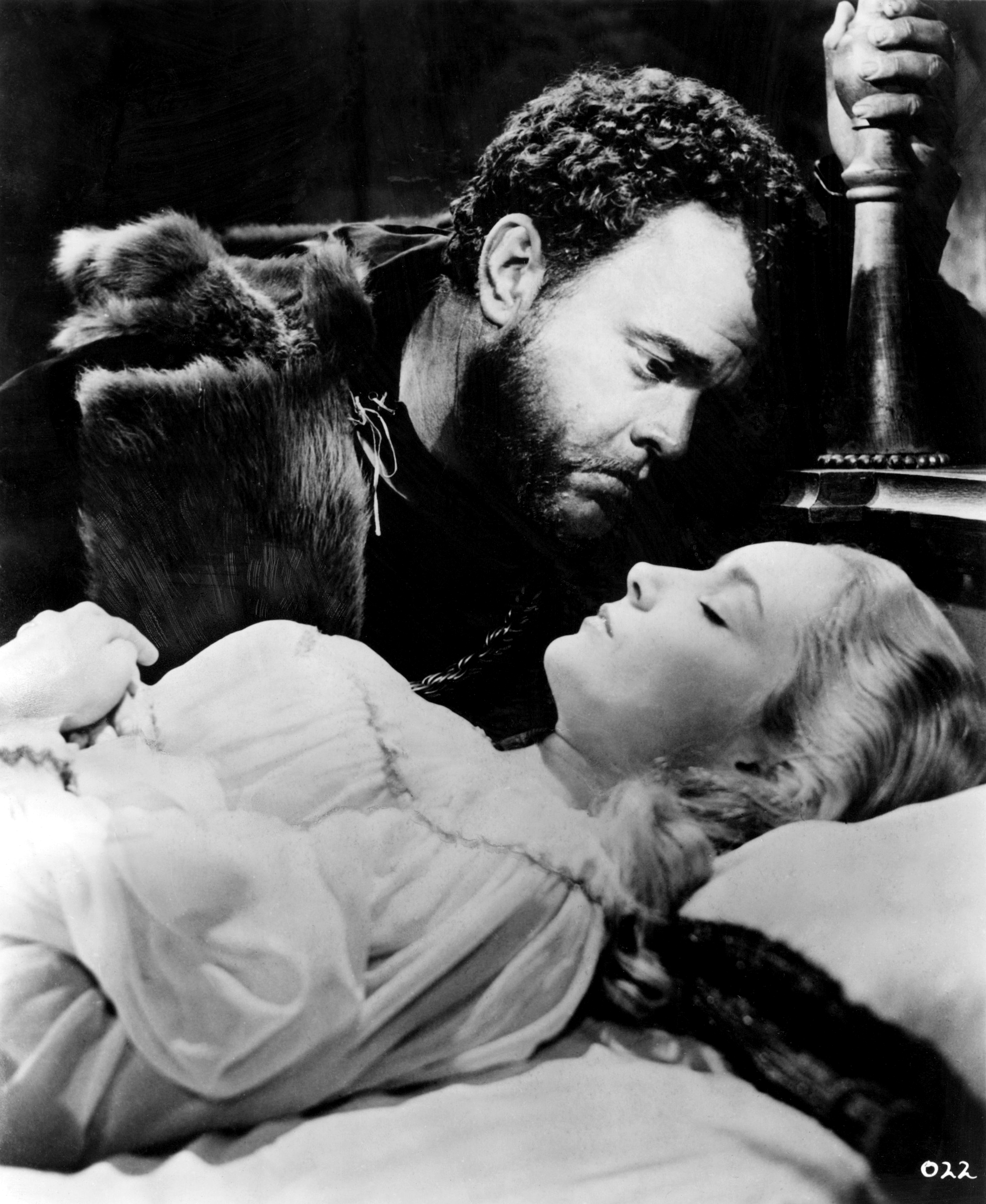
Orson Welles and Suzanne Cloutier in Othello (1951)

Year	Title	Role	Notes
1946	Temptation	Yvonne Dupont	
1949	The Sinners	Maria Lambert	
1951	Juliette, or Key of Dreams	Juliette	
1951	Othello	Desdemona	
1952	Derby Day	Michele Jolivet	
1954	Doctor in the House	Stella	
1961	Romanoff and Juliet	Marfa Zlotochienka	
1997	The Countess of Baton Rouge	Virginie Beaufort	
1998	It's Your Turn, Laura Cadieux	Hôtesse du restaurant	
