= Roderigo =

Character in Othello

- Othello character
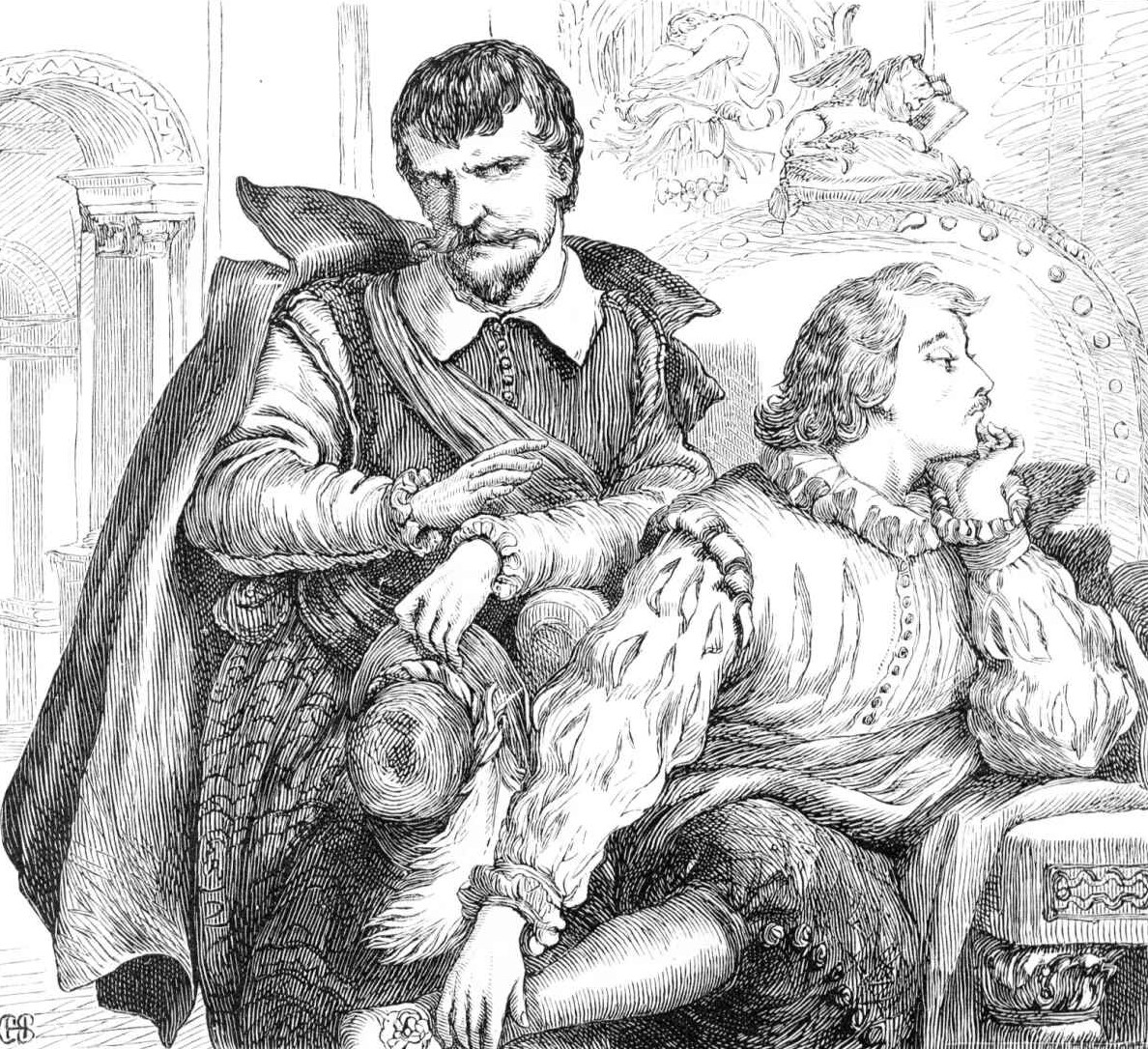
- Wood engraving of Roderigo (right) speaking with Iago (left) in Act 1, Scene 3, by Henry Courtney Selous
- Created by: William Shakespeare
- Portrayed by: Ferdinand von Alten (1922); Robert Coote, (1952); Robert Lang (1965); Michael Maloney (1995); Deepak Dobriyal (2006)

Roderigo is a fictional character in Shakespeare's 1604 play Othello. Roderigo, a wealthy Venetian, is manipulated into funding the antagonist Iago's plot against Othello in the hopeless belief that Iago will aid him in courting Othello's wife Desdemona. In the later acts, Iago recruits Roderigo to assassinate Othello's former lieutenant Michael Cassio, though he is killed by Iago when he fails in his attempt to do so.

Despite Shakespeare heavily basing Othello on Cinthio's Italian language tale Un Capitano Moro, Roderigo has no counterpart in the original text, unlike other characters, suggesting that Shakespeare created the character himself.

== Sources ==
While Shakespeare based Othello on a number of sources, the play was primarily based on the 1565 tale The Story of a Moorish Captain in Italian by Cinthio.

== Role in Othello ==
Roderigo is introduced in the play's opening in Act One, Scene One, where, alongside Iago, he alerts Desdemona's father Brabantio that his daughter is eloping with Othello, a fact that Iago knows will cause him great annoyance. After breaking off from Iago, who hid in the earlier scene from Brabantio's sight, he joins Brabantio and his men in their journey to Sagittary in Act One, Scene Two, in hopes of finding Othello and Desdemona. They find Othello and Brabantio tells him he will bring the law on him, but Othello reveals he has already been summoned by the Duke for some "present business of the state". At the council-chamber, Othello and Desdemona reveal that they are truly in love and married, which sends Roderigo into a suicidal despair. Iago manages to convince him to stick with their plan by promising that, if Roderigo "puts money in his purse", they will be able to destroy Othello, giving him the perfect chance to win Desdemona over. A heartened Roderigo promises to sell all of his lands.

In Act Two, Roderigo joins Iago in his journey to Cyprus, where the Venetians are expecting a Turk invasion, in hopes of being able to woo Desdemona. When the Turks drown in the ocean, Iago convinces Roderigo to invoke a brawl with Cassio, whom Iago has convinced to get drunk, leading to Cassio wounding the Cypriot governor Montano. Othello demotes Cassio as punishment.

He does not appear again until Act Four, Scene Two where he is enrolled in Iago's plot to murder Cassio, a desire he has had since the start of the play. In Act Five, Scene One, Roderigo is wounded in his botched assassination attempt of Cassio: he becomes the first to realise Iago's true plans. He is then fatally stabbed by Iago, cursing him before his departure.

== Performances ==
Modern renditions of the play generally portray Roderigo as a naive fool lusting for love, who falls victim to Iago's cunning eloquence.

Robert Coote played Roderigo in Orson Welles's 1952 film. Other actors playing his role include Ferdinand von Alten in the 1922 silent version starring Emil Jannings, Robert Lang in the 1965 version starring Laurence Olivier, and Michael Maloney in the film version with Laurence Fishburne.

In 2006, Omkara, the Bollywood version of Othello, Roderigo née Rajan ’Rajju’ Tiwari was played by Deepak Dobriyal.
