= Bianca (Othello) =

- Othello character
- Doris Dowling as Bianca in Orson Welles' 1952 film, Othello
- Created by: William Shakespeare
- Portrayed by: Doris Dowling (film, 1952); Betsy Blair (TV, 1955); Sheila Reid, (film, 1965); Wendy Morgan (TV, 1981); Indra Ové (film, 1995); Bipasha Basu (Omkara, a 2006 Bollywood adaptation); Scarlett Brookes (RSC 2015)

In-universe information
- Significant other: Michael Cassio (lover)

Bianca is a fictional character in William Shakespeare's Othello (c. 1601–1604). She is Cassio's jealous lover. Despite her brief appearance on stage, Bianca plays a significant role in the progress of Iago's scheme to make Othello believe that his wife Desdemona is cheating on him with Cassio.

== Role in Othello ==
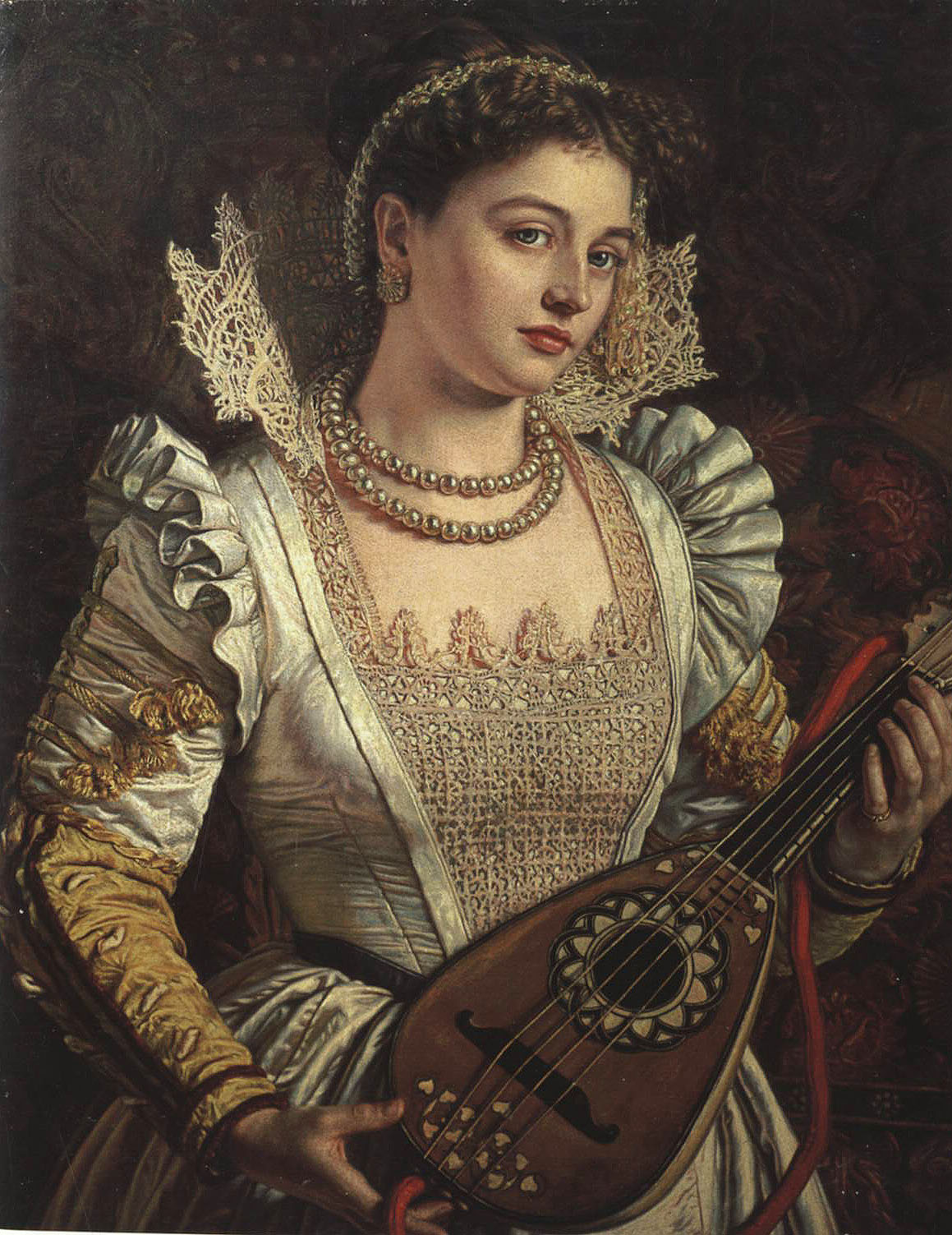
Painting by William Holman Hunt

In Act 3, Scene 3, Iago reveals to the audience that, having surreptitiously obtained the handkerchief that Othello had originally given Desdemona as a lover's token, he will lose it in Cassio's lodging. Upon discovering the handkerchief in the following scene, Cassio admires its craftsmanship and asks Bianca to copy it for him. Bianca, already furious with Cassio for his apparent disregard of their relationship, suggests that the handkerchief is a gift from another woman, but eventually agrees to his request.

Midway through Act 4, Scene 1, and prior to Bianca's entrance, Othello has been secretly observing a bawdy discussion between Iago and Cassio about the latter's sexual exploits with a young woman. Thanks to Iago's impeccable planning (and some bad luck), neither speaker mentions the name of the woman in question; it is in fact Bianca, but Othello tragically assumes it to be his wife, Desdemona. Bianca suddenly enters, and her suspicions of Cassio are even greater than before. She is convinced that the handkerchief belongs to another woman, and throws it contemptuously at Cassio's feet. In Othello's eyes, her apparent jealousy confirms his wife's infidelity. This "evidence" completes Iago's manufactured case against Desdemona, and thereafter Othello is determined to murder both her and Cassio.

In Act 5, Scene 1, Bianca arrives just after Cassio has been stabbed by Iago. She reacts with horror and concern. Iago, pretending to have just entered the scene, accuses Bianca of having been part of the group that attacked Cassio. Iago claims her emotional reaction is due to her being caught rather than concern for Cassio and gets her to admit that Cassio ate at her home earlier that evening. Both Iago and Emilia call her a prostitute, but Bianca replies "I am no strumpet; but of life as honest / as you that doth abuse me" (5.1.122-3). She is led off at the end of the scene to be questioned about the attack and is not mentioned again in the play.

== In film and television ==
Bianca was played by Doris Dowling in Orson Welles's 1952 adaptation, Sheila Reid in Laurence Olivier's 1965 version, and Indra Ové in a 1995 feature film. She was featured in O, an adaptation set in a modern high school, as "Brandy", and as "Billo Chamanbahar" the Hindi film Omkara. In this variation, the Bianca character is not given a handkerchief, but a jewelled belt called a kamarbandh.

Bianca was portrayed by Betsy Blair in a 1955 BBC adaptation and by Wendy Morgan a 1981 BBC series.
