= Othello and Desdemona in Venice =

Painting by Théodore Chassériau

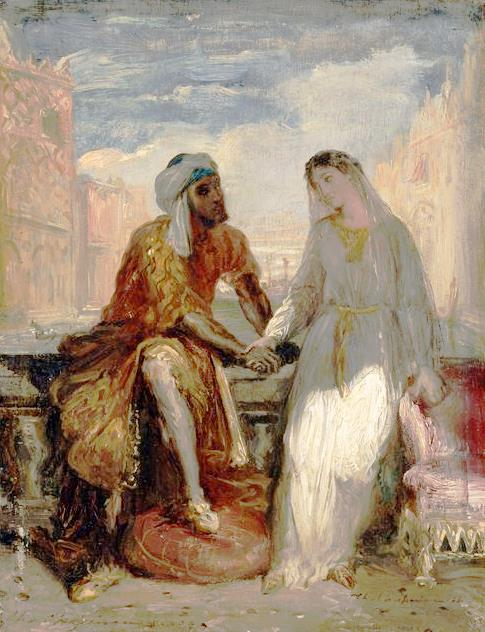
- Artist: Théodore Chassériau
- Year: 1850
- Type: Oil on panel, history painting
- Dimensions: 25 cm × 20 cm (9.8 in × 7.9 in)
- Location: Louvre, Paris

Othello and Desdemona in Venice (French: Othello et Desdemone à Venise) is an oil painting on panel by the French artist Théodore Chassériau, from 1850. Inspired by William Shakespeare's 1604 tragedy Othello, it depicts Othello and his wife, Desdemona amongst the canals of Venice. Works based on Shakespeare were a common theme during the romantic era. The painting is now in the collection of the Louvre, in Paris, having been acquired in 1934

== Bibliography ==
- Sandoz, Marc Théodore Chassériau, 1819-1856: Catalogue raisonné des peintures et estampes. 1974.
