= Iago =

Fictional character in Shakespeare's Othello

- Othello character
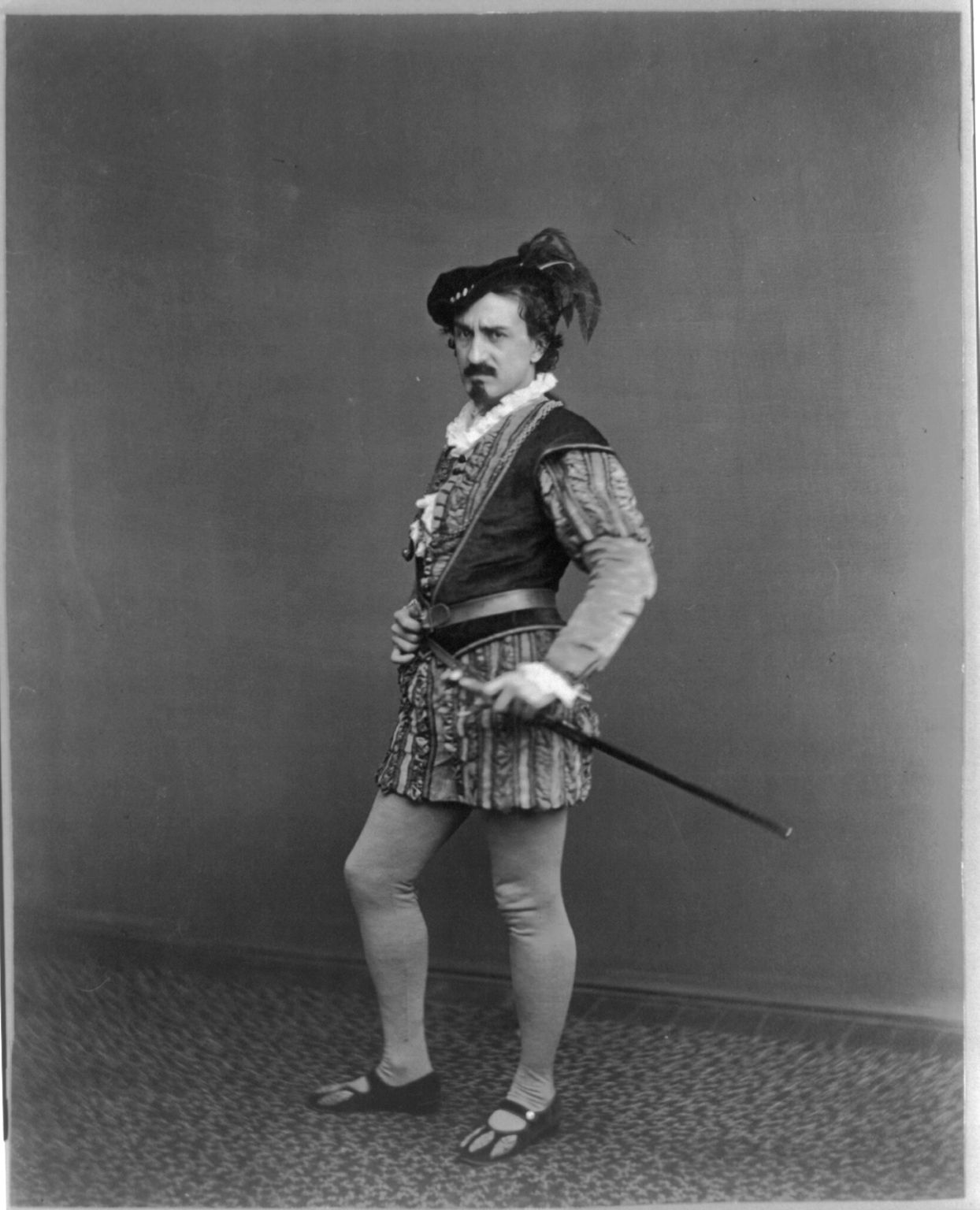
- Edwin Booth as Iago, c. 1870
- Created by: William Shakespeare

In-universe information
- Affiliation: Republic of Venice
- Spouse: Emilia

Iago (/i.ˈɑː.ɡoʊ/) is a fictional character in Shakespeare's Othello (c. 1601–1604). Iago is the play's main antagonist and Othello's standard-bearer. He is the husband of Emilia who is in turn the attendant of Othello's wife Desdemona. Iago hates Othello and devises a pernicious scheme to destroy him by making him believe that Desdemona is having an affair with his lieutenant, Michael Cassio. With 1,097 lines, Iago has more lines in the play than Othello himself.

== Role in the play ==
Iago is a soldier who has fought beside Othello for several years and has become an ensign. At the beginning of the play, Iago claims to have been unfairly passed over for promotion to the rank of Othello's lieutenant in favour of Michael Cassio. Iago plots to manipulate Othello into demoting Cassio, and thereafter to bring about the downfall of Othello himself and also others in the play who trusted Iago. He has an ally, Roderigo, who assists him in his plans in the mistaken belief that after Othello is gone, Iago will help Roderigo earn the affection of Othello's wife, Desdemona. After Iago engineers a drunken brawl to ensure Cassio's demotion (in Act 2), he sets to work on his second scheme: leading Othello to believe that Desdemona is having an affair with Cassio. This plan occupies the final three acts of the play.

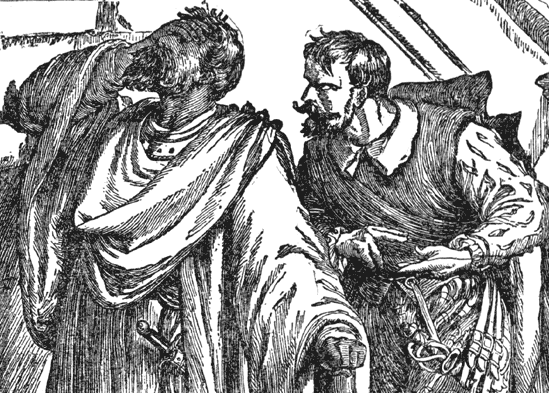
Othello and Iago

He manipulates his wife Emilia, Desdemona's lady-in-waiting, into taking from Desdemona a handkerchief that Othello had given her; he then tells Othello that he had seen it in Cassio's possession. Once Othello flies into a jealous rage, Iago tells him to hide and look on while he (Iago) talks to Cassio. Iago then leads Othello to believe that a bawdy conversation about Cassio's mistress, Bianca, is in fact about Desdemona. Mad with jealousy, Othello orders Iago to kill Cassio, promising to make him lieutenant in return. Iago then engineers a fight between Cassio and Roderigo in which the latter is killed (by Iago himself, double-crossing his ally), but the former merely wounded.

Iago's plan appears to succeed when Othello kills Desdemona, who is innocent of Iago's charges. Soon afterwards, however, Emilia brings Iago's treachery to light, and Iago kills her in a fit of rage before being arrested. He remains famously reticent when pressed for an explanation of his actions before he is arrested: "Demand me nothing. What you know, you know. From this time forth I never will speak word." Following Othello's suicide, Cassio, now in charge, condemns Iago to be imprisoned and tortured as punishment for his crimes.

== Description of character ==
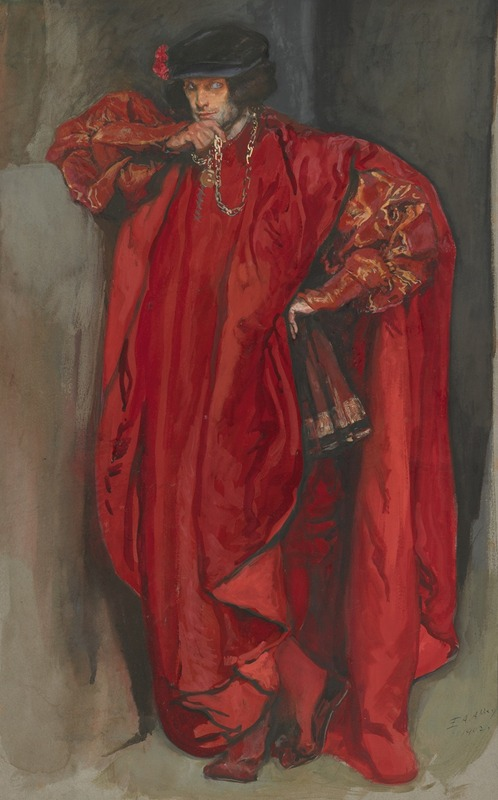
Depiction of Iago from the Shakespeare play Othello by Edwin Austin Abbey

Iago is one of Shakespeare's most sinister villains, often considered such because of the unique trust that Othello places in him, which he betrays while maintaining his reputation for honesty and dedication. Shakespeare contrasts Iago with Othello's nobility and integrity.

Iago is a Machiavellian schemer and manipulator, as he is often referred to as "honest Iago", displaying his skill at deceiving other characters so that not only do they not suspect him, but they count on him as the person most likely to be truthful.

Shakespearean critic A. C. Bradley said that "evil has nowhere else been portrayed with such mastery as in the evil character of Iago", and also states that he "stands supreme among Shakespeare's evil characters because the greatest intensity and subtlety of imagination have gone into his making." The mystery surrounding Iago's actual motives continues to intrigue readers and fuel scholarly debate.

== Performances ==
The role is thought to have been first played by Robert Armin, who typically played intelligent clown roles such as Touchstone in As You Like It and Feste in Twelfth Night. Other notable actors who have portrayed the character on stage and screen include Edwin Booth, Affonceka, Werner Krauss in the 1922 silent film version, José Ferrer, Micheál Mac Liammóir in the 1951 film adaptation, Frank Finlay in the 1965 film version, Bob Hoskins in season 4 of BBC Television Shakespeare (1981), Christopher Plummer, Ian McKellen in the Theatre Night production (1990), Andre Braugher, Kenneth Branagh in the 1995 film version, Liev Schreiber, Andy Serkis, Daniel Craig, Mark Rylance, Jake Gyllenhaal and Toby Jones.

Jerry Lee Lewis played Iago in the original production of the musical Catch My Soul, loosely based on Shakespeare's play. Josh Hartnett, Christopher Eccleston and Saif Ali Khan played characters based on Iago in productions that reimagined Othello in modern settings, respectively in O, in the 2001 TV movie and in the Bollywood adaptation Omkara.

== Critical discussion ==
In discussing The Tragedy of Othello, scholars have long debated Iago's role—highlighting the complexity of his character and manipulativeness. Fred West contends that Shakespeare was not content with simply portraying another "stock" morality figure, and that he, like many dramatists, was particularly interested in the workings of the human mind. Thus, according to West, Iago, who sees nothing wrong with his own behaviour, is "an accurate portrait of a psychopath", who is "devoid of conscience, with no remorse".

Bradley writes that Iago "illustrates in the most perfect combination the two facts concerning evil, which seem to have impressed Shakespeare the most", the first being that "the fact that perfectly sane people exist in whom fellow-feeling of any kind is so weak that an almost absolute egoism becomes possible to them", with the second being "that such evil is compatible, and even appears to ally itself easily, with exceptional powers of will and intellect". The same critic also famously said that "to compare Iago with the Satan of Paradise Lost seems almost absurd, so immensely does Shakespeare's man exceed Milton's Fiend in evil".

Weston Babcock, however, would have readers see Iago as a "human being, shrewdly intelligent, suffering from and striking against a constant fear of social snobbery". According to Babcock, it is not malice, but fear, that drives Iago. For, "Iago dates his maturity, as he considers it, his ability to understand the world, from the age at which he recognized every remark to be personally pointed. One only who lacks inner assurance and is so constantly on guard against any hint of his inferiority could so confess himself".

John Draper, on the other hand, postulates that Iago is simply "an opportunist who cleverly grasps occasion" (726), spurred on by "the keenest of professional and personal motives". Draper argues that Iago "seized occasions rather than made them". According to his theory, Iago "is the first cause, but events, once under way, pass out of his control". Following this logic, Draper concludes that Iago "is neither as clever nor as wicked as some would think; and the problem of his character largely resolves itself into the question: was he justified in embarking upon the initial stages of his revenge?"

== Motives ==
Laurence Fishburne and Kenneth Branagh as Othello and Iago, respectively, in a scene from the 1995 film version of Othello

Iago has been described as a "motiveless malignity" by Samuel Taylor Coleridge. This reading would seem to suggest that Iago, much like Don John in Much Ado About Nothing or Aaron in Titus Andronicus, wreaks havoc on the other characters' lives for no ulterior purpose.

Léone Teyssandier writes that a possible motive for Iago's actions is envy towards Desdemona, Cassio and Othello; Iago sees them as more noble, generous and, in the case of Cassio, more handsome than he is. In particular, he sees the death of Cassio as a necessity, saying of him that "He hath a daily beauty in his life that makes me ugly".

Micheál Mac Liammóir, who played the character in Orson Welles' 1951 film adaptation and wrote a memoir about the production, said that he and Welles had imagined Iago to be sexually impotent, which made him jealous of the happily married Othello.

Andy Serkis, who in 2002 portrayed Iago at the Royal Exchange Theatre in Manchester, wrote in his memoir Gollum: How We Made Movie Magic, that:

There are a million theories to Iago's motivations, but I believed that Iago was once a good soldier, a great man's man to have around, a bit of a laugh, who feels betrayed, gets jealous of his friend, wants to mess it up for him, enjoys causing him pain, makes a choice to channel all his creative energy into the destruction of this human being, and becomes completely addicted to the power he wields over him. I didn't want to play him as initially malevolent. He's not the Devil. He's you or me feeling jealous and not being able to control our feelings.

Iago reveals his true nature only in his soliloquies, and in occasional asides. Elsewhere, he is charismatic and friendly, and the advice he offers to both Cassio and Othello is superficially sound; as Iago himself remarks: "And what's he then, that says I play the villain, when this advice is free I give, and honest...?"

It is this dramatic irony that drives the play.

In Giuseppe Verdi's Otello, an 1887 operatic adaptation of the play, Iago reveals his theology in his Act II aria "Credo in un dio crudel", which has no counterpart in Shakespeare's original: he does believe in a god, but a cruel god who created him in his likeness and that the evil he does is to fulfill his destiny. He also enunciates in the aria that he believes an honest man to be a mocking actor about whom everything is a lie and that mankind is simply a joke of iniquitous fate.
