= Desdemona =

Character in Shakespeare's play Othello

- Othello character
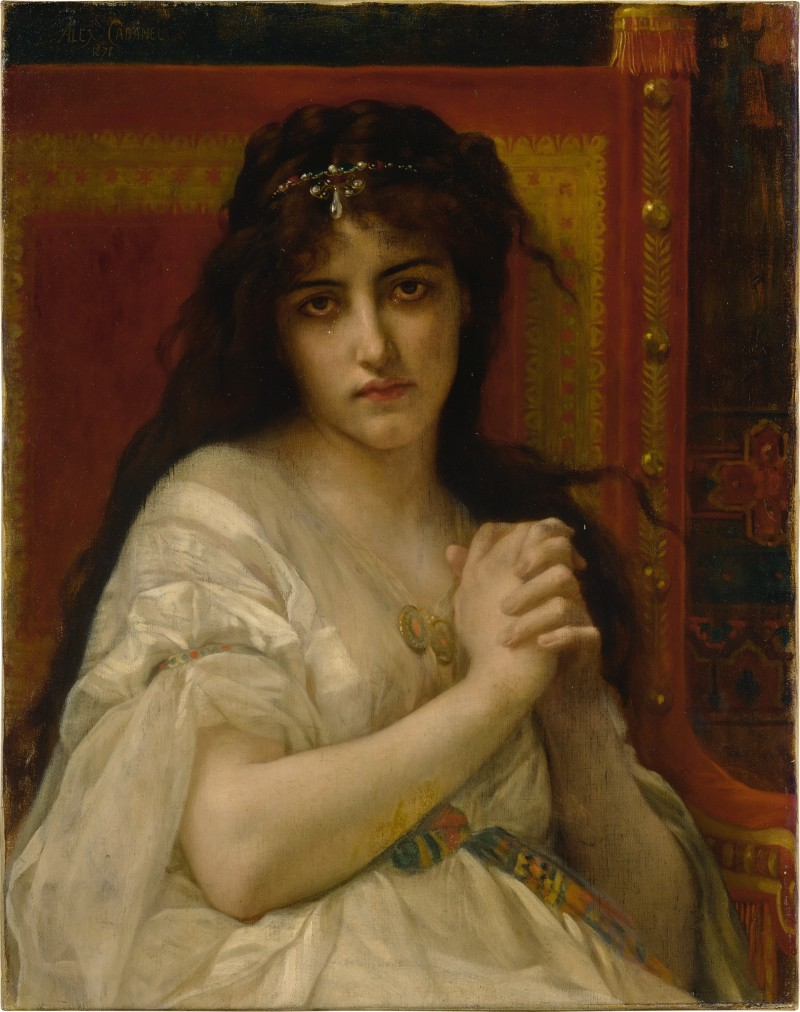
- Desdémone by Alexandre Cabanel
- Created by: William Shakespeare
- Portrayed by: Margaret Hughes; Sarah Siddons; Namsrayn Suvd; Helen Faucit; Ellen Terry; Peggy Ashcroft; Uta Hagen; Elisabeth Sladen; Maggie Smith; Manju Warrier; Kareena Kapoor; Jenny Agutter; Julia Stiles

In-universe information
- Affiliation: Emilia, attendant and confidante
- Family: Othello, husband; Brabantio, father

Desdemona (/ˌdɛzdəˈmoʊnə/) is a character in William Shakespeare's play Othello (c. 1601–1604). Shakespeare's Desdemona is a Venetian beauty who enrages and disappoints her father, a Venetian senator, when she elopes with Othello, a Moorish Venetian military prodigy. When her husband is deployed to Cyprus in the service of the Republic of Venice, Desdemona accompanies him. There, her husband is manipulated by his ensign Iago into believing she is an adulteress, and, in the last act, she is murdered by her estranged spouse.

== Role in Othello ==
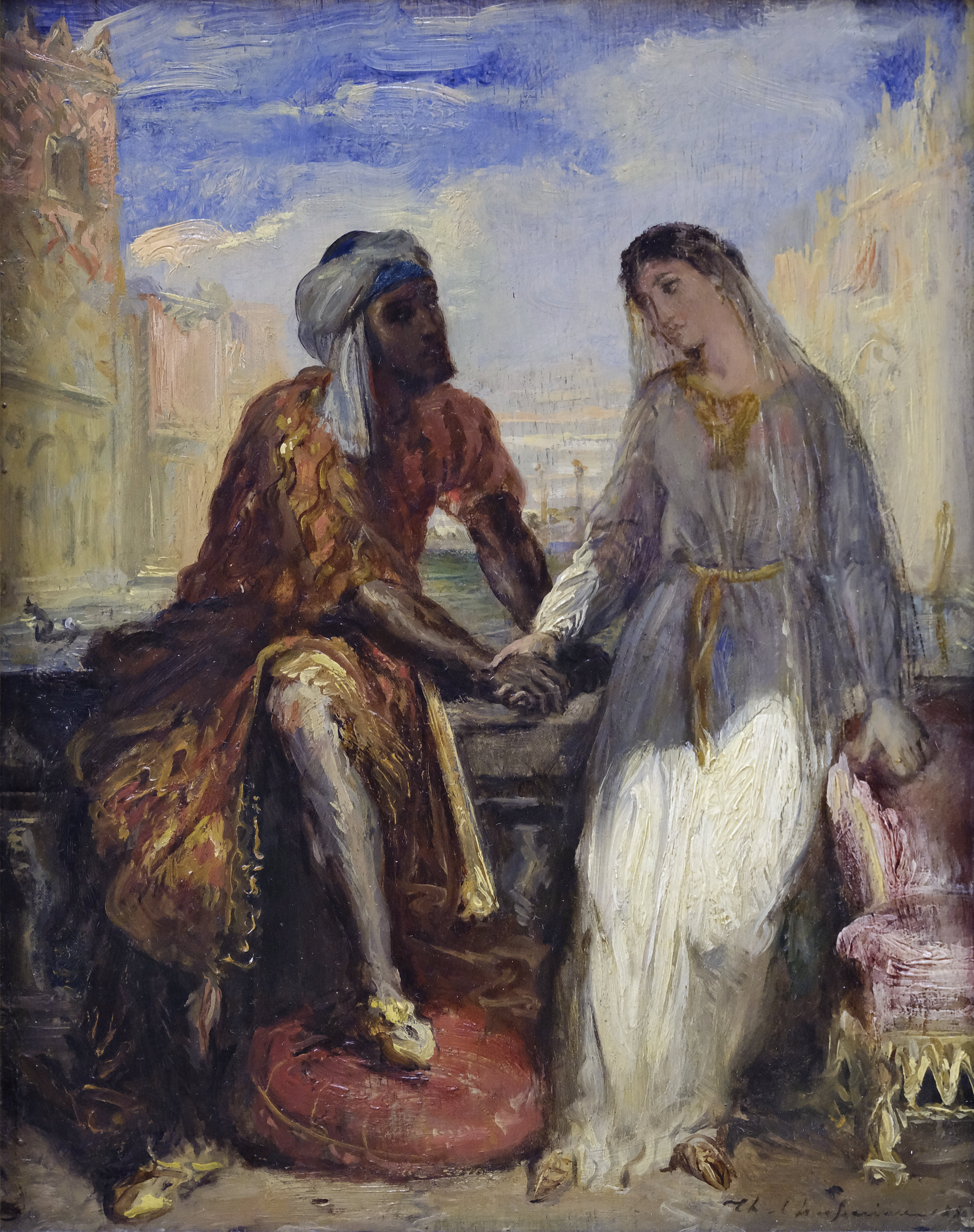
Othello and Desdemona in Venice by Théodore Chassériau, 1850

In the play's first act, Desdemona has eloped with Othello, a Moor in the service of the Venetian Republic. Before the Duke of Venice, his councilmen, and her father, she proclaims her love for Othello and defends her choice. Her father, Brabantio, reluctantly accepts the union but warns Othello that she will someday deceive him. When Othello is sent to Cyprus in the line of duty, Desdemona accompanies him with his ensign's wife, Emilia, attending her.

In act 2, Othello's lieutenant, Michael Cassio, is disgraced in a brawl and falls from Othello's favour. Iago suggests to Cassio that he ask Desdemona to intercede for him, which she does. Meanwhile, Iago persuades Othello that Desdemona has formed an illicit relationship with Cassio. However, many critics argue that the first seed of doubt is not issued from Iago but by Desdemona's father:

"Look to her, Moor, if thou hast eyes to see.
She hath deceived her father and may thee." (1.3)

Desdemona is confident that the strong love she bears for Othello is noble, and she becomes emboldened. The passion of her love arouses her husband, but also fills him with worry and suspicion at the same time.

In act 3, scene 3, Desdemona drops her handkerchief. Emilia picks it up and gives it to Iago who has asked her many times in the past to steal it. Iago takes it and forbids Emilia to disclose its whereabouts to Desdemona. Iago plants the article in Cassio's room. Eventually, Othello sees Cassio with the handkerchief and accepts it as confirmation of Desdemona's infidelity.

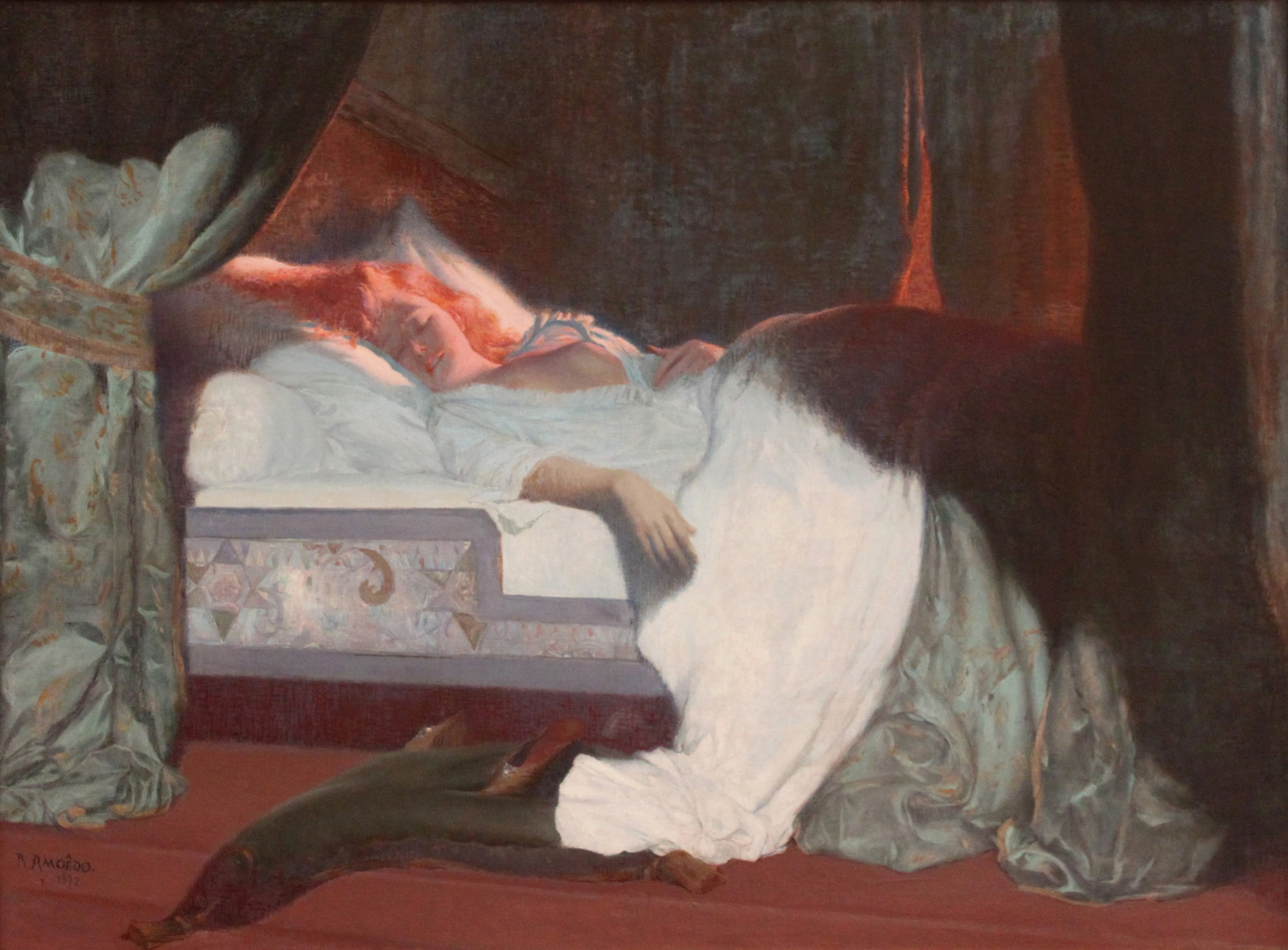
Rodolfo Amoedo – Desdemona

Desdemona is concerned over the loss of the handkerchief but maintains that its loss will not cause Othello to grow angry. Emilia is more cynical, especially after Othello violently asks to see it. Desdemona is confused over her husband's behaviour, which culminates in his striking her in public and calling her a whore.

Desdemona is deeply upset by her husband's attacks but continues to assert her love. In the final act, Othello tells her that he knows she has been unfaithful, and is going to kill her. Despite Desdemona's claims of innocence, Othello refuses to believe her, and when he tells her that Cassio has been killed, Desdemona cries out. Othello becomes enraged and strangles Desdemona, ignoring her pleas for mercy. When her maid Emilia rushes into the room, Desdemona rises weakly to defend Othello, then dies.

In the final act, Othello learns of Desdemona's faithfulness when Emilia exposes Iago's true nature before being stabbed to death by Iago. Out of complete remorse, Othello commits suicide, but only after angrily stabbing Iago (though not fatally) as retribution for his lies against Desdemona. Desdemona's cousin Lodovico then orders that Iago be tortured and executed.

Harley Granville-Barker's 1930 essay Prefaces to Shakespeare - Othello includes an extended character analysis of Desdemona.

== Description of the character ==
Desdemona by W.Paget, 1900

Desdemona first appears on stage in act 1 scene 3 of the play. However, she it a topic of conversation in the first two scenes, described by Iago as Brabantio's "white yew" which "an old black ram [Othello] / Is tupping" (1.1). Desdemona is often described as "gentle" (1.2, 1.3, 2.1, 2.3). Her father initially describes her as "tender, fair, and happy" (1.2), yet upon learning that she has eloped with Othello, Brabantio warns Othello that "She has deceived her father and may thee" (1.3). Iago will eventually use Brabantio's warning against Desdemona's character as part of the false narrative he creates to destroy Othello.

As Iago convinces Othello that Desdemona has been unfaithful to him, Othello describes Desdemona's perceived change physically:

"Her name, that was as fresh
As Dian’s visage, is now begrimed and black
As mine own face." (3.3)

When Iago's plot is revealed to Othello, he is grief-stricken for the violence against his wife. He looks upon her corpse which he describes as "Pale as thy smock" (5.2). This is Desdemona's final description in the play.

Desdemona's name is an early indicator of her death, deriving from the Greek δυσδαίμων for ill-fated.

== Performance history ==
Gertrude Elliot (1874–1950) as Desdemona by Window & Grove, 1903

Suzanne Cloutier as Desdemona in Orson Welles' 1952 film, Othello

The role has attracted notable actresses through the centuries and has the distinction of being the first role performed professionally by Margaret Hughes, the first actress to appear on an English public stage. Since then, numerous actresses have taken the stage as Desdemona.

The RSC has staged Othello several times in the 21st century. Lisa Dillon played the role in the 2004 Gregory Duran production, followed by Joanna Vanderham in Iqbal Khan's 2015 production (the first RSC Othello to cast a black actor as Iago). Juliet Rylance played the character in Tim Carroll's 2024 production.

Also in 2024, Poppy Gilbert played the role in the Shakespeare's Globe production directed by Ola Ince. Previously at Shakespeare's Globe, Zoë Tapper played Desdemona in Wilson Milam's 2007 production.

In a 1951 film version, Suzanne Cloutier played Desdemona opposite Orson Welles. The film won the grand prize Palme d'Or at the 1952 Cannes Film Festival.

In a 1966 British film version, Maggie Smith played the character opposite Laurence Olivier. The film holds the record for the most Academy Award nominations given to a Shakespeare film adaptation. Maggie Smith and co-stars Olivier, Frank Finlay (Iago), and Joyce Redman (Emilia) all received acting nominations.

In a 1995 film version, Irène Jacob played the character opposite Laurence Fishburne.

There have been numerous screen modernisations of the play. In O (2001), Julia Stiles played a character based on Desdemona in a version of Othello set in a contemporary high school. A 2001 British made-for-television film featuring Keeley Hawes as Desdemona "Dessie" Brabant also updates the action, picturing John Othello (Eamonn Walker) and Ben Jago (Christopher Eccleston) as high ranking Metropolitan Police officers. In 2006, Omkara, a Bollywood version of Othello, Dolly Mishra (Desdemona) was played by Kareena Kapoor.

== Bibliography ==
- Shakespeare, William (1995). Oeuvres Complètes (in French and English). Vol. Tragédies II (Bouquins ed.). Robert Laffont.
- Brigitte Tast, Hans-Jürgen Tast: Orson Welles – Othello – Mogador. Aufenthalte in Essaouira, Kulleraugen Vis.Komm. Nr. 42, Schellerten 2013, ISBN 978-3-88842-042-9
