= Ola Ince =

British theatre director

Ola Ince is a British theatre director. She is noted for her Shakespeare productions. Her work often includes themes of power and race.

== Early life and education ==
Ince was born 1988 or 1989 in London to working class parents, and grew up in Norbury. At 14, she knew she wanted to be a theatre director. She went to BRIT School and studied directing at Rose Bruford College. She is of Caribbean and Nigerian heritage.

== Work ==
Her work include Branden Jacobs-Jenkins' Appropriate, her full directorial debut, Anna Deavere Smith's Twilight: Los Angeles, 1992, Danai Gurira's The Convert and Aleshea Harris' Is God Is in 2021. She also worked on the musical Tina. According to Ince, her work "focuses on power, race and injustice." She says that "America’s frank obsession with power and race really speaks to the themes I’m interested in. I’m attracted to the jugular." and "Theatre is a form of activism, it should try and change things."

In 2021, she produced Romeo and Juliet with Alfred Enoch and Rebekah Murrell in the title roles. The play put focus on themes like crime, poverty, teenage depression and the patriarchy. When Ince was asked in 2019 to direct the play, to be performed at Shakespeare's Globe, she hesitated. "It is the home of traditional Shakespeare, and that's not what I wanted to work on. ... I'm a Shakespeare anarchist." Being promised she could do whatever she liked, she accepted. Gay Times said "... while the concept is strong, the execution is sometimes lacking. On balance it’s still an entertaining watch, but there’s potential here for something even better." The Evening Standard said "Still, this remains one of the most effective readings of this play that I’ve seen in years. Despite its occasional clumsiness, Ince’s vision is more nuanced than many attempts to give a ‘relevant’ spin to the Capulet-Montague feud." According to Time Out, "It's a shame Enoch's over-slick Romeo never really clicks with Murrell’s Juliet. You have to think part of the reason is that the wooing scene is effectively cut out, and replaced with the songs. But the songs are great! It's a bit broken. Traditionalists will recoil. But it’s thrillingly imperfect." The Guardian said "This is a high-stakes rewiring of Romeo and Juliet with so much energy and cleverness at play that the romance is barely missed at all." The Times said "Like an over-eager English teacher out to prove that Shakespeare is “relevant” to modern youth, this Romeo and Juliet underscores the story’s issues while failing to give the sort of life to the human drama that would make them matter."

In 2023, she produced the 1990 musical Once on This Island by Lynn Ahrens and Stephen Flaherty. Reviews were generally positive.

In 2024, she directed Othello. In this version, Othello (Ken Nwosu) is an officer in the Metropolitan Police, and his subconscious is a separate character (Ira Mandela Siobhan). The Guardian said "Ultimately, the concepts lead to a surfeit of ideas, pushing against each other. At over three hours, the tension drops, although the play never loses its potency and offers a genuinely new, exciting experience." According to Time Out, "I admire Ince's chutzpah, and for a while at the start it looks like she might have carried it off. But it progressively loses steam. There’s undeniably some great ideas here: I hope Ince gets to return to the play one day." The Times said "The signposting isn’t quite as crude in this modern-dress production, but Ince’s desire to make the piece more accessible still leads to some jarring moments. ... Sometimes, like Subconscious Othello’s gesticulations, it needs to be dialled down a little." The Telegraph said that "What you do get is the sheer horror of what [Othello's] fall entails. This sparklingly clear, at times thrillingly pacy production convincingly argues that Othello is as much a play about men who kill women as it is about race." The Evening Standard review concluded that "I was compelled throughout, though, and believed in Othello's duping and his descent into madness, which isn’t always the case. I have an ex-cop friend who claims the Met is not as bad as the media paints it, but Ince's vision feels horribly credible."

In November 2025, Ince took over as director of The Mousetrap at St Martin's Theatre, the longest-running production in the West End.

== Recognition ==
She won the Genesis Future Director Award in 2016, suggesting a production of the 1960s play Dutchman. She won the Peter Hall Bursary Award in 2020.
