= Gli Hecatommithi =

1565 short story collection by Cinthio

- Author: Giovanni Battista Giraldi Cinthio
- Language: Italian
- Publisher: Lionardo Torrentino
- Publication date: 1565
- Publication place: Duchy of Savoy

Gli Hecatommithi (lit. 'The Hundred Stories'), also known as just Hecatommithi, is a 1565 short story collection by the Italian writer Giovanni Battista Giraldi Cinthio.

== Summary ==
The collection is modelled on The Decameron by Giovanni Boccaccio with ten groups of ten stories each, and an additional ten stories in the introduction and three at the end of the third and fourth decade, giving a total of 113 stories. It has a frame story set in 1527, where a group of people flee the Sack of Rome in a ship to Marseille and entertain themselves by telling stories during the journey.

The stories vary in subjects and tone, including crime, comedic situations and romantic love. They were described at the time as stories that aim to reflect modern life and Christian humanism.

== Publication ==
The book was first printed in 1565 by Lionardo Torrentino in Mondovì. It was a success it its time and had been published in seven editions by 1608. Gabriel Chappuys produced a French translation published in two volumes in 1583–1584. Selected stories appeared in English translation in William Painter's Palace of Pleasure (1566–1575) and Barnabe Rich's Riche his Farewell to Militarie Profession (1581).

== Adaptations ==
Cinthio was also a playwright and adapted several of his own stories into plays. William Shakespeare used stories from Gli Hecatommithi as the main sources for his plays Othello (III.7) and Measure for Measure (VIII.5), the latter via the 1578 play Promos and Cassandra by George Whetstone. According to Hugh M. Richmond, the principal love intrigues of A Midsummer Night's Dream may be adapted from Gli Hecatommithi II.8.
