= Ludovico Marchetti =

Italian painter (1853–1909)

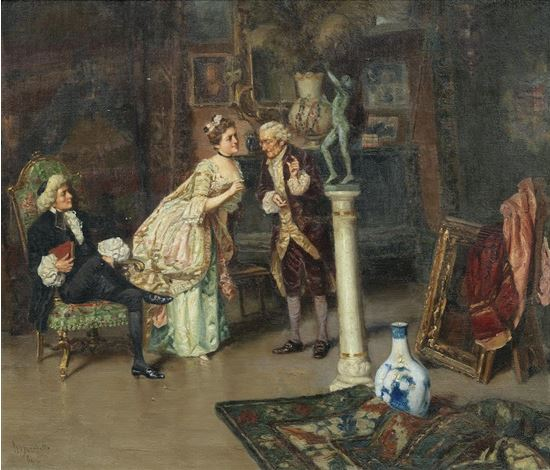
The Collector's Room

Ludovico Marchetti (10 May 1853, Rome - 20 June 1909, Paris) was an Italian-born painter of genre scenes, who spent most of his life in France.

== Biography ==
His artistic education began in the studios of Mariano Fortuny, a Spanish painter who lived in Rome during the 1870s.

Shortly after completing his studies there, in 1878, aged twenty-five, he moved to France, where he would remain for the rest of his life. There, he continued his studies and began holding exhibits at the Salon; receiving a bronze medal in 1889. As his reputation grew, he exhibited in Munich and Berlin as well, where he developed a sizeable following.

He specialized in historical period pieces, largely scenes from the 16th, 17th and 18th centuries, designed for the tastes of the petit-bourgeoise. His favorite subjects were the cavaliers, troubadours and courtiers of the 18th century, dramatically re-imagined with richly colored clothes and fine fabrics.

Today, he may be best remembered for the illustrations he created for a popular reprinting of Shakespeare's plays; notably Othello and Romeo and Juliet.

== Sources ==
- Brief biography @ AskArt
- Brief Biography @ the Rehs Galleries
