= Michael Cassio =

Character in Othello

- Othello character
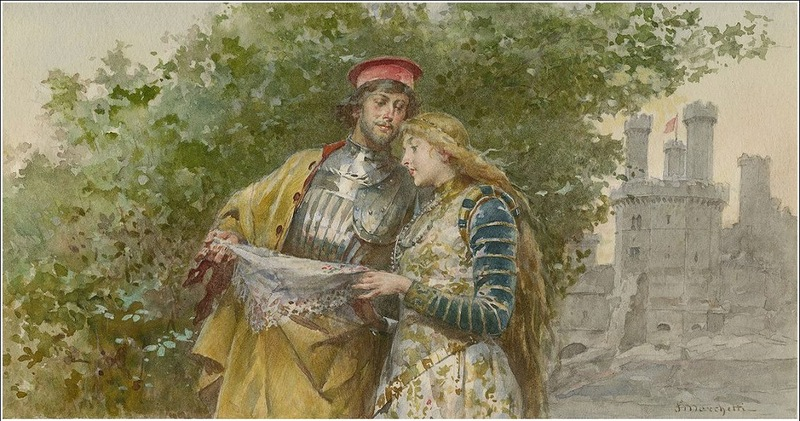
- With Bianca. Drawing by Ludovico Marchetti
- Created by: William Shakespeare

In-universe information
- Significant other: Bianca (lover)

Michael Cassio, or simply Cassio (/ˈkæsioʊ/), is a fictional character in William Shakespeare's Othello. The source of the character is the 1565 tale "Un Capitano Moro" by Cinthio; Cassio is unnamed in Cinthio but referred to as "the squadron leader". In Othello, Cassio is a young and handsome lieutenant under Othello's command who becomes one of several victims in Iago's plot to ruin Othello.

== Sources ==
Othello has its source in the 1565 tale "Un Capitano Moro" from Gli Hecatommithi by Giovanni Battista Giraldi Cinthio. His story may have been based on a historical incident which occurred in Venice around 1508. No English translation of Cinthio was available in Shakespeare's lifetime. Gabriel Chappuy had produced a French translation in 1584, but Shakespeare's version hews more closely to the original. Cassio is based upon Cinthio's squadron leader.

== Role in Othello ==
Cassio is a gentlemanly Florentine soldier, a man of high manners and theoretical learning, and one of Othello's chief lieutenants. There is a supposed rivalry between Cassio and the play's villain, Iago. Iago claims to envy Cassio because Othello chose Cassio rather than Iago as his lieutenant, in spite of the fact that Cassio has no practical knowledge of battle. Iago uses Cassio in his scheme to destroy Othello. Othello's jealousy is eventually stoked by Iago into homicidal rage.

"Reputation, reputation, reputation! O, I have lost my reputation! ... My reputation, Iago, my reputation!"

— Cassio, [2.3.156-159]

In the second act, Cassio's life is nearly ruined by Iago's cunning and his own foolishness. Iago tricks Cassio into getting drunk and then incites his friend Roderigo to start a brawl with Cassio. The Cypriot governor Montano tries to end the fight by stepping between the two men, and Cassio, now blind drunk, strikes out at him. As a result, Cassio loses his lieutenancy.

A major aspect of Iago's plot to destroy Othello includes implicating Cassio in an affair with Othello's wife, Desdemona. Iago plants Desdemona's handkerchief in Cassio's room. When Othello sees Cassio give the handkerchief (which he knows to be his wife's) to Bianca, Othello takes it as confirmation of his wife's infidelity.

Later in the play, Iago persuades Roderigo to assassinate Cassio, and together they arrange an ambush. Roderigo attacks Cassio by surprise. Cassio retaliates and mortally wounds Roderigo, but is himself stabbed from behind by Iago. His leg is wounded, but he survives. Iago then kills the wounded Roderigo. Before Othello commits suicide, he apologizes to Cassio for believing Iago's lies about him.

== Performance history ==
In productions of Othello, Cassio has been portrayed by actors such as Hayden Adams, Tom Hiddleston, Jonathan Bailey, Derek Jacobi, and Andrew Burnap. Jacobi portrayed Cassio in Laurence Olivier's version of Othello, both on stage and screen. He has also been portrayed by Nathaniel Parker in the 1995 film production of Othello. Omkara, a 2006 Indian film adaptation, has a character named Kesu Firangi, based on Cassio and portrayed by Vivek Oberoi.
