= Othello (character) =

Character in "Othello"

- Othello character
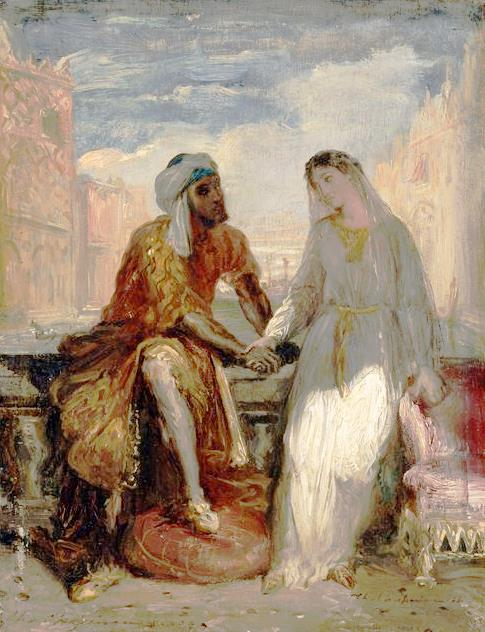
- Othello and Desdemona in Venice by Théodore Chassériau, 1850)
- Created by: William Shakespeare
- Based on: "The Moorish Captain" from Cinthio's Hecatommithi

In-universe information
- Alias: The Moor
- Occupation: Soldier
- Affiliation: Republic of Venice
- Spouse: Desdemona
- Religion: Catholic; formerly Islam
- Origin: Africa or Arabia

Othello (Note: /əˈθɛloʊ/ ə-THEL-oh, also US: /oʊˈ-/ oh-) is the titular protagonist in Shakespeare's Othello (c. 1601–1604). The character's origin is traced to the tale "Un Capitano Moro" in Gli Hecatommithi by Giovanni Battista Giraldi Cinthio. There, he is simply referred to as the Moor.

Othello was first mentioned in a Revels account of 1604 when the play was performed on 1 November at Whitehall Palace with Richard Burbage almost certainly Othello's first interpreter. Modern notable performers of the role include Paul Robeson, Orson Welles, Richard Burton, James Earl Jones, Laurence Fishburne, Laurence Olivier, Patrick Stewart, and Avery Brooks.

== Role ==
Othello is a Venetian soldier. After their time in Venice, Othello is appointed general in the Venetian Army. Iago, his jealous ensign, tricks him into believing that his wife Desdemona is having an affair with Michael Cassio, his captain. Othello kills his wife out of jealousy by strangling her, only to realize that his wife was faithful after Emilia reveals the truth, at which point he commits suicide.

== Ethnicity ==
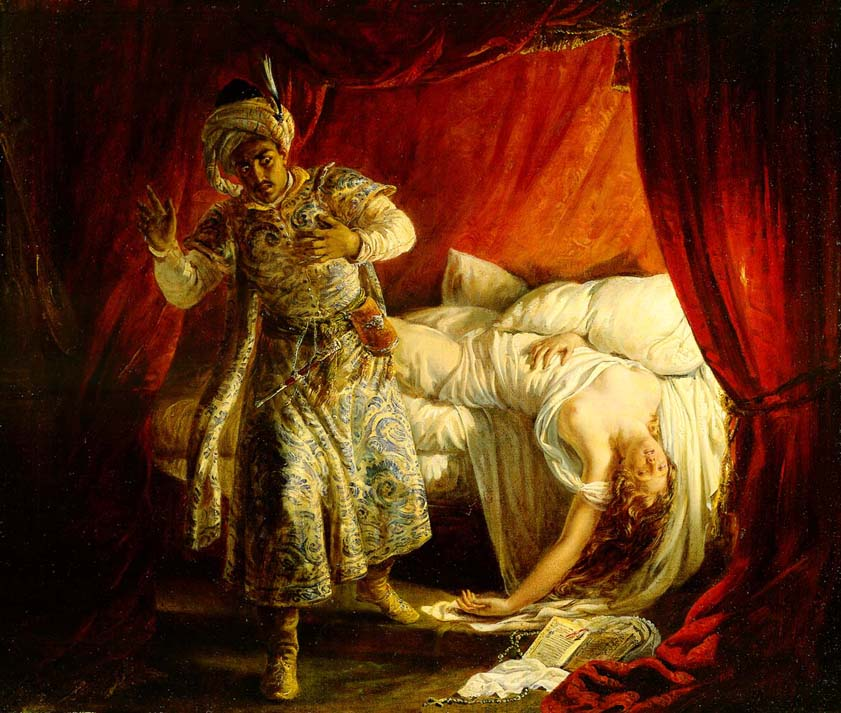
Othello and Desdemona by Alexandre-Marie Colin, 1829

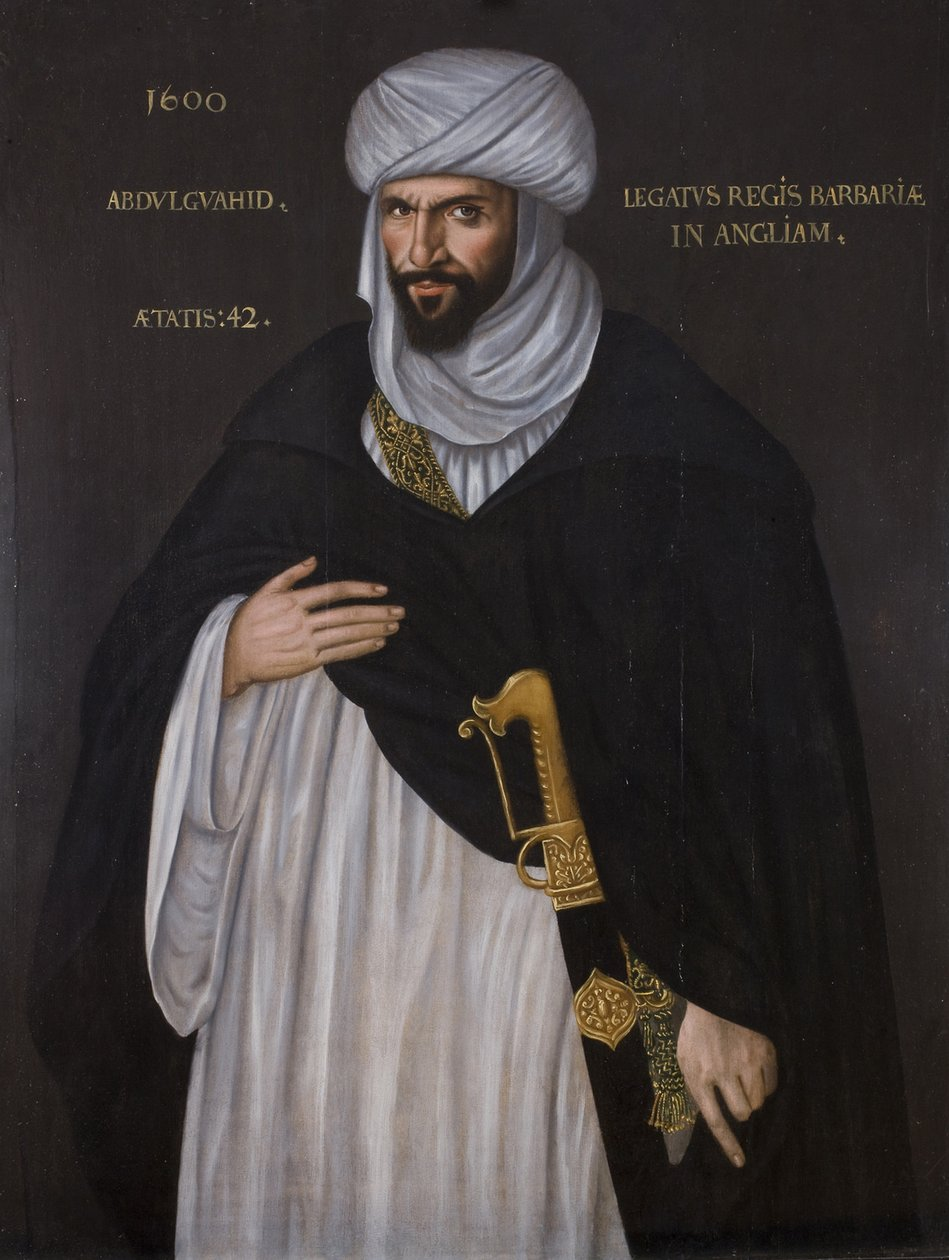
Portrait of Abd el-Ouahed ben Messaoud, ambassador of Ahmad al-Mansur of Morocco to Queen Elizabeth I in 1600, sometimes claimed as an inspiration for Othello.

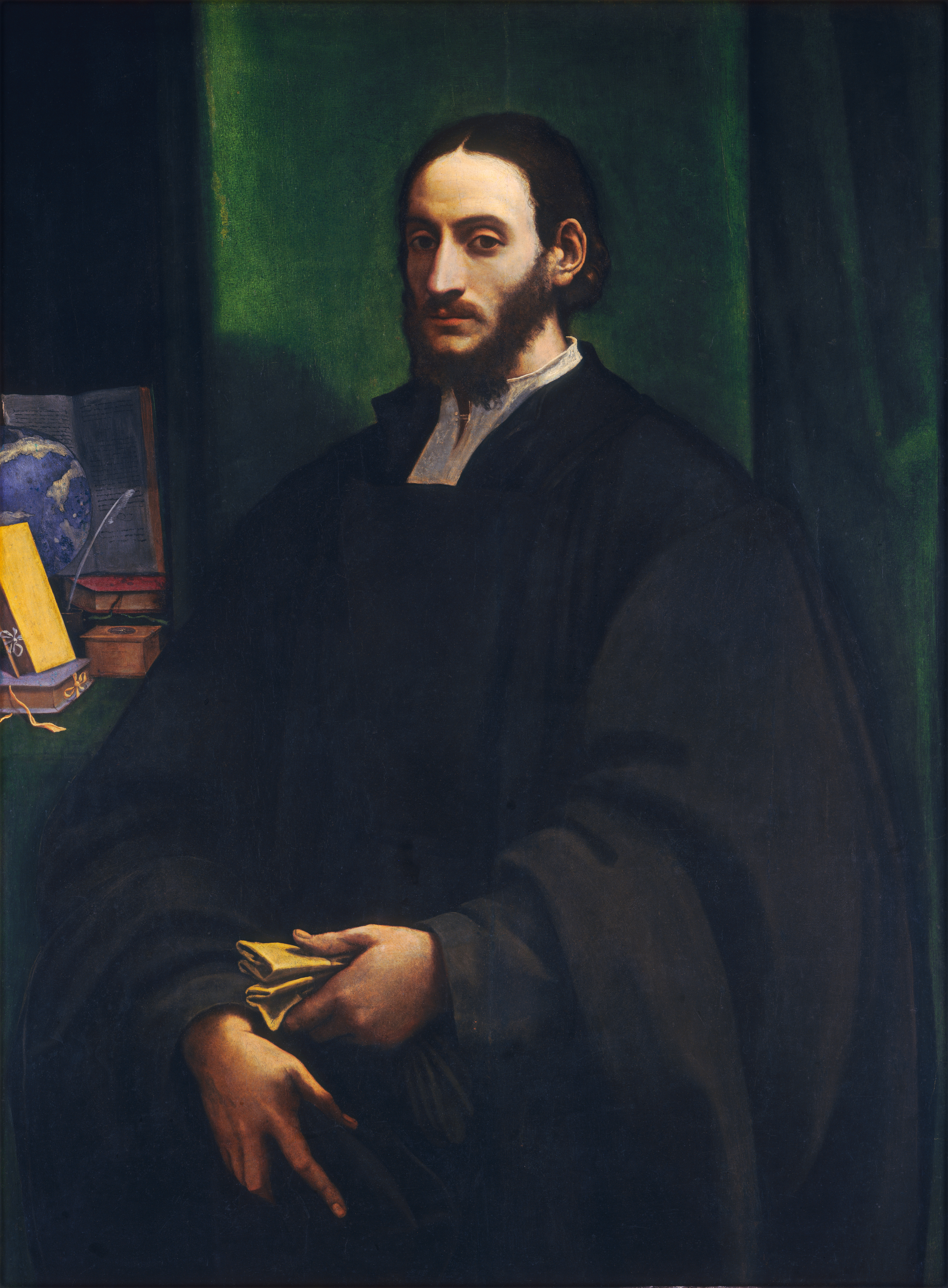
Portrait possibly of Leo Africanus, another possible inspiration for Othello

There is no final consensus over Othello's ethnicity; whether of Maghrebi origin as in the generally accepted definition of "Moor", or of Sub-Saharan African. E. A. J. Honigmann, the editor of the Arden Shakespeare edition, concluded that Othello's ethnic background is ambiguous. "Renaissance representations of the Moor were vague, varied, inconsistent, and contradictory. As critics have established, the term 'Moor' referred to dark-skinned people in general, used interchangeably with similarly ambiguous terms as 'African', 'Ethiopian' and even 'Indian' to designate a figure from Africa (or beyond)." Various uses of the word "black" (for example, "Haply for I am black") are insufficient evidence for any accurate racial classification, Honigmann argues, since "black" could simply mean "swarthy" to Elizabethans. A. C. Bradley, in an argument then reproduced by James Welton, argued that Shakespeare probably imagined Othello as black rather than light-brown, while also cautioning that Shakespeare's distinction between Moors and other Africans need not correspond to modern racial classifications. This conclusion rested on an analysis of the description of the character's reflections on his own complexion, as well as early theatrical representations and similarities with Aaron in Shakespeare's other play, Titus Andronicus.

Virginia Mason Vaughan suggests that the racial identity of the character of Othello fits more clearly as a man from Sub-Saharan Africa than from North Africa (Barbary), as north Africans were more easily accepted into society. She states that by 1604, accounts of Othello as deriving from farther south were not uncommon. She notes Roderigo's description of Othello having "thick lips" was a racial stereotype used by 16th century explorers for Sub-Saharan Africans. Modern-day readers and theatre directors lean away from a North African Moorish interpretation but Shakespeare's textual references are unclear. Iago twice uses the word "Barbary" or "Barbarian" to refer to Othello, seemingly referring to the Barbary coast inhabited by the "tawny" Moors. Roderigo calls Othello "the thicklips", which seems to refer to European conceptions of Sub-Saharan African physiognomy, but Honigmann counters that, as these comments are all intended as insults by the characters, they need not be taken literally.

Michael Neill, editor of the Oxford Shakespeare edition, notes that the earliest known critical references to Othello's colour, (Thomas Rymer's 1693 critique of the play, and the 1709 engraving in Nicholas Rowe's edition of Shakespeare), assume him to be a black man, while the earliest known North African interpretation was not until Edmund Kean's production of 1814. It has been suggested that Abd el-Ouahed ben Messaoud ben Mohammed Anoun, ambassador of the King of Morocco to Queen Elizabeth I in 1600, may have been an inspiration for Othello. He stayed with his retinue in London for several months and occasioned much discussion, and thus might have inspired Shakespeare's play, written only a few years afterwards. The exact date that Othello was written is unknown, though sources indicate that it was written between 1601 and 1610, sometime after the Moorish delegation. However, Honigmann questions the view that ben Messaoud inspired Othello.

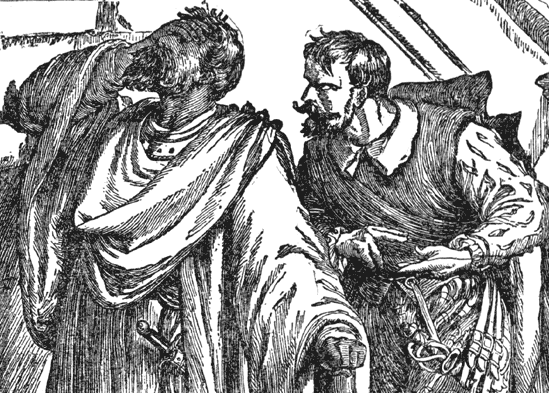
Othello and Iago (1901)

Othello is referred to as a "Barbary horse" (1.1.113), a "lascivious Moor" (1.1.127), and "the devil" (1.1.91). In III.III, he denounces Desdemona's supposed sin as being "black as mine own face". Desdemona's physical whiteness is otherwise presented in opposition to Othello's dark skin; V.II "that whiter skin of hers than snow". Iago tells Brabantio that "an old black ram / is tupping your white ewe" (1.1.88). In Elizabethan discourse, the word "black" could suggest various concepts that extended beyond the physical colour of skin, including a wide range of negative connotations.

Ira Aldridge pioneered the prominence of black actors in the role, beginning in 1825 in London. Othello was also frequently performed as an Arab Moor during the 19th century. In the past, Othello would often have been portrayed by a white actor in theatrical makeup. Black American actor Paul Robeson played the role from 1930 to 1959. Recent actors who chose to "blacken up" include Laurence Olivier (1965) and Orson Welles. Black English actor Wil Johnson, known for his roles in Waking the Dead and Emmerdale, played Othello on stage in 2004. Since the 1960s it has become commonplace to cast a black actor in the character of Othello, although the casting of the role now can come with a political subtext. Patrick Stewart took the role in the Shakespeare Theatre Company's 1997 staging of the play with race-reversed casting, and Thomas Thieme, also white, played Othello in a 2007 Munich Kammerspiele staging at the Royal Shakespeare Theatre; both played without blackface, their performances critically acclaimed.

== 20th-century Othellos ==
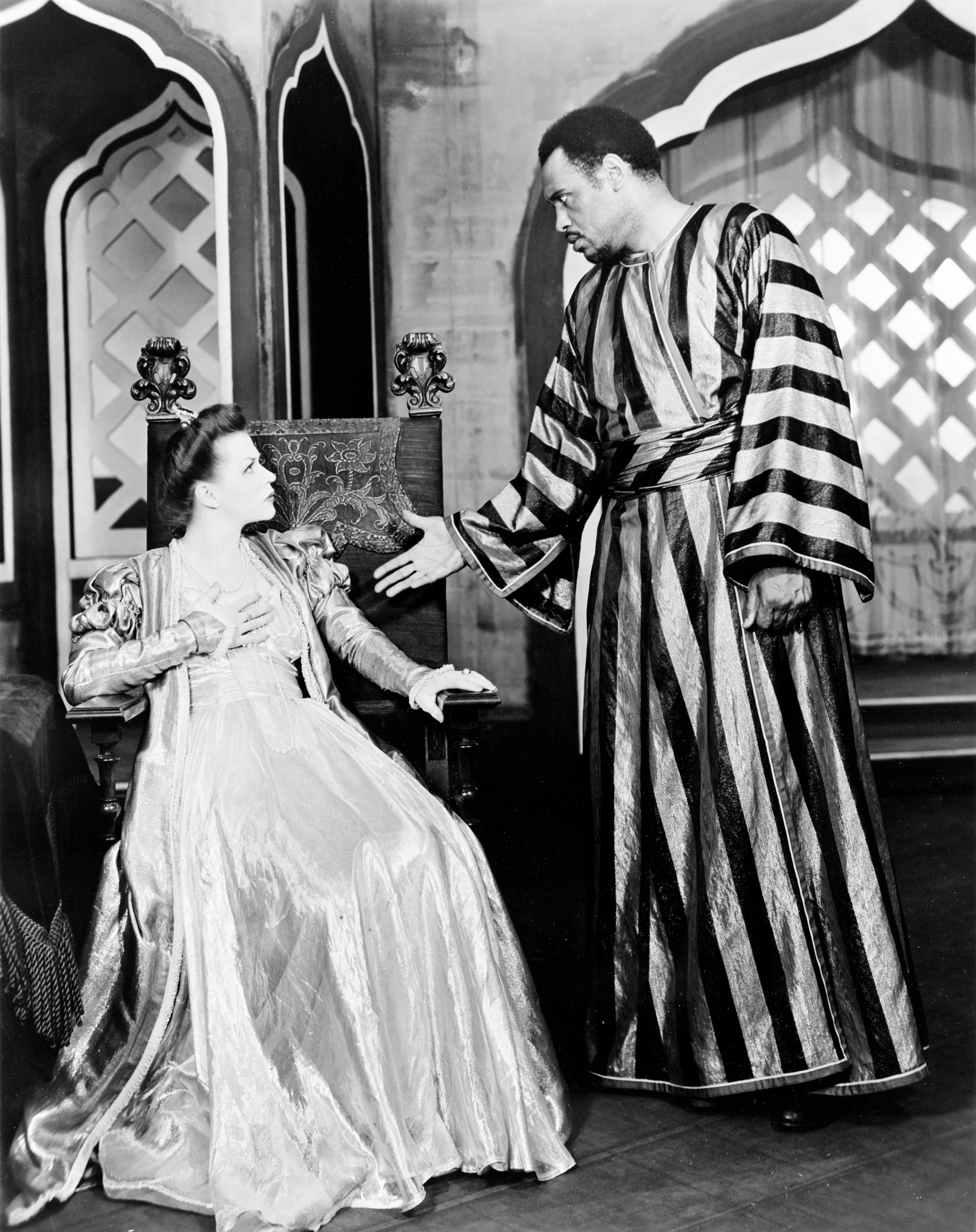
Paul Robeson and Uta Hagen (1943)

The most notable American production may be Margaret Webster's 1943 staging starring Paul Robeson as Othello and José Ferrer as Iago. This production was the first ever in America to feature a black actor playing Othello with an otherwise all-white cast (there had been all-black productions of the play before). It ran for 296 performances, almost twice as long as any other Shakespearean play ever produced on Broadway. Although it was never filmed, it was the first nearly complete performance of a Shakespeare play released on records. Robeson played Othello in three separate productions between 1930 and 1959. He first played it opposite a cast that included Peggy Ashcroft as Desdemona and Ralph Richardson as Roderigo, and would return to it in 1959 at Stratford on Avon.

The American actor William Marshall performed the title role in at least six productions. His Othello was called by Harold Hobson of the London Sunday Times "the best Othello of our time", continuing: "nobler than Tearle, more martial than Gielgud, more poetic than Valk. From his first entry, slender and magnificently tall, framed in a high Byzantine arch, clad in white samite, mystic, wonderful, a figure of Arabian romance and grace, to his last plunging of the knife into his stomach, Mr Marshall rode without faltering the play's enormous rhetoric, and at the end the house rose to him." Marshall also played Othello in a jazz musical version, Catch My Soul, with Jerry Lee Lewis as Iago, in Los Angeles in 1968. His Othello was captured on record in 1964 with Jay Robinson as Iago and on video in 1981 with Ron Moody as Iago. The 1982 Broadway staging starred James Earl Jones as Othello and Christopher Plummer as Iago.

"Othello" (5:05)
James Earl Jones performs Othello's Act I, scene iii speech from Shakespeare Othello at the White House Evening of Poetry, Music, and the Spoken Word on 12 May 2009.

"Othello"
Audio only version

When Laurence Olivier gave his acclaimed performance of Othello at the Royal National Theatre (UK) in 1964, he had developed a case of stage fright that was so profound that when he was alone onstage, Frank Finlay (who was playing Iago) would have to stand offstage where Olivier could see him to settle his nerves. This performance was recorded complete on LP, and filmed by popular demand in 1965 (according to a biography of Olivier, tickets for the stage production were notoriously hard to get). The film version still holds the record for the most Oscar nominations for acting ever given to a Shakespeare film – Olivier, Finlay, Maggie Smith (as Desdemona) and Joyce Redman (as Emilia, Iago's wife) were all nominated for Academy Awards.

Actors have alternated the roles of Iago and Othello in productions to stir audience interest since the nineteenth century. Two of the most notable examples of this role swap were William Charles Macready and Samuel Phelps at Drury Lane (1837) and Richard Burton and John Neville at the Old Vic Theatre (1955). When Edwin Booth's tour of England in 1880 was not well attended, Henry Irving invited Booth to alternate the roles of Othello and Iago with him in London. The stunt renewed interest in Booth's tour. James O'Neill also alternated the roles of Othello and Iago with Booth.

White actors have continued to take the role. These include British performers Paul Scofield at the Royal National Theatre in 1980, Anthony Hopkins in the BBC Shakespeare television production (1981), and Michael Gambon in a stage production at Scarborough directed by Alan Ayckbourn in 1990. In 1997, Patrick Stewart took the role with the Shakespeare Theatre Company (Washington, D.C.) in a race-bending performance, in a "photo negative" production of a white Othello with an otherwise all-black cast. Stewart had wanted to play the title role since the age of 14, so he and director Jude Kelly inverted the play so Othello became a comment on a white man entering a black society. Two Indian adaptations of Othello has been released. In 1997, Kaliyattam the Malayalam film adaptation starred Suresh Gopi playing the Othello part in the role of Kannan Perumalayan. In 2006, Omkara, the Bollywood version of Othello, Othello née Omkara 'Omi' Shukla was played by Ajay Devgan. In 2016, baritone and actor David Serero took the role in a Moroccan adaptation in New York.

In a 2024 production by Ola Ince, Othello, an officer in the Metropolitan Police and his subconscious, are played by different actors.

== Performance history ==
- Ira Aldridge
- Edwin Booth
- Avery Brooks
- Richard Burbage
- Richard Burton
- Keith Hamilton Cobb
- Billy Crudup (as Ned Kynaston playing Othello in Stage Beauty)
- Ajay Devgn (as Omkara Shukla in Omkara)
- Chiwetel Ejiofor
- Laurence Fishburne
- Colin McFarlane
- Mark Holden
- Johnston Forbes-Robertson
- Suresh Gopi (as Kannan Perumalayan in Kaliyattam)
- Moses Gunn
- John Gielgud
- Paul Harris (as Aurelius Rex in All Night Long)
- Lenny Henry
- Anthony Hopkins
- Emil Jannings
- Wil Johnson
- James Earl Jones
- Paterson Joseph
- Raúl Juliá
- Yaphet Kotto
- Adrian Lester
- Art Malik
- William Marshall
- John Neville
- Cyril Nri
- Ken Nwosu
- James O'Neill
- Laurence Olivier
- Mekhi Phifer (as Odin in O)
- Hugh Quarshie
- Paul Robeson
- Tommaso Salvini
- Paul Scofield
- Kobna Holdbrook-Smith
- Patrick Stewart
- Eamonn Walker
- Denzel Washington
- Orson Welles
