= List of ship launches in 1759 =

The list of ship launches in 1759 includes a chronological list of some ships launched in 1759.

Date	Ship	Class	Builder	Location	Country	Notes
1 January	Fame	Third rate	Bird	Deptford	Great Britain	For Royal Navy.
15 January	Firm	Edgar-class ship of the line	Perry	Blackwall Yard	Great Britain	For Royal Navy.
16 January	Terror	Infernal-class bomb vessel	John Barnard	Harwich	Great Britain	For Royal Navy.
17 January	Minerva	Southampton-class frigate	John Quallett	Rotherhithe	Great Britain	For Royal Navy.
27 January	Carcass	Infernal-class bomb vessel	Stanton & Wells	Rotherhithe	Great Britain	For Royal Navy.
28 January	Thésée	Défenseur-class ship of the line	Pierre Salinoc	Brest, France	Kingdom of France	For French Navy.
10 February	Basilisk	Infernal-class bomb vessel	William Wells	Deptford	Great Britain	For Royal Navy.
12 February	Modeste	Third rate	Noel Pomet	Toulon	Kingdom of France	For French Navy.
27 February	Blast	Infernal-class bomb vessel	Elias Bird	Northam	Great Britain	For Royal Navy.
14 March	Mortar	Infernal-class bomb vessel	William Wells	Deptford	Great Britain	For Royal Navy.
15 March	Hercules	Hercules-class ship of the line	Adam Hayes	Deptford Dockyard	Great Britain	For Royal Navy.
15 March	Mars	Dublin-class ship of the line	William Pownall	Woolwich Dockyard	Great Britain	For Royal Navy.
15 March	Thunder	Infernal-class bomb vessel	John Henniker	Chatham	Great Britain	For Royal Navy.
28 March	Hero	Third rate	Thomas Bucknall	Plymouth Dockyard	Great Britain	For Royal Navy.
29 March	Nossa Senhora da Ajuda e São Pedro de Alcântara	Third rate	Manuel Vicente Nunes	Lisbon Royal Arsenal	Kingdom of Portugal	For Portuguese Navy.
14 April	Sandwich	Sandwich-class ship of the line	John Lock	Chatham Dockyard	Great Britain	For Royal Navy.
28 April	Tweed	Fifth rate	Hugh Blaydes	Hull	Great Britain	For Royal Navy.
May	Royal Louis	First rate	Jacque-Luc Coulomb	Brest	Kingdom of France	For French Navy.
25 June	Phoenix	Fifth rate	John & Robert Batson	Limehouse	Great Britain	For Royal Navy.
10 August	Valiant	Valiant-class ship of the line	John Lock	Chatham Dockyard	Great Britain	For Royal Navy.
20 September	Milford	Coventry-class frigate	Richard Chitty	Milford	Great Britain	For Royal Navy.
25 September	Niger	Niger-class frigate		Sheerness Dockyard	Great Britain	For Royal Navy.
5 October	Supply	Armed tender	Henry Bird	Rotherhithe	Great Britain	For Royal Navy.
Unknown date	Boscawen	Sloop of war		Ticonderoga, New York	Thirteen Colonies	For Royal Navy.
Unknown date	Duke of Cumberland	Sloop of war		Ticonderoga, New York	Thirteen Colonies	For Royal Navy.
Unknown date	Duke of Richmond	East Indiaman	John Perry	Blackwall	Great Britain	For British East India Company.
Unknown date	Invincible	Radeau	builder	Fort Niagara, New York	Thirteen Colonies	For Royal Navy.
Unknown date	Foudre	Éclair-class gunboat	Chevallier Antoine Groignand	Havre de Grâce	Kingdom of France	For French Navy.
Unknown date	Normande	Fifth Rate	Joseph-Louis Ollivier	Havre de Grâce	Kingdom of France	For French Navy.
Unknown date	Aspic	Vipère-class gunboat	Antoine Thevenard	Saint-Malo	Kingdom of France	For French Navy.
Unknown date	Tempète	Éclair-class gunboat	Chevallier Antoine Groignand	Havre de Grâce	Kingdom of France	For French Navy.
Unknown date	Vipère	Vipère-class gunboat	Antoine Thevenard	Saint-Malo	Kingdom of France	For French Navy.
Unknown date	Éclair	Éclair-class gunboat	Chevallier Antoine Groignand	Havre de Grâce	Kingdom of France	For French Navy.
Unknown date	Tonnerre	Éclair-class gunboat	Chevallier Antoine Goignand	Havre de Grâce	Kingdom of France	For French Navy.
Unknown date	Ligonier	Radeau		Ticonderoga, New York	Thirteen Colonies	For Royal Navy.
Unknown date	Mohawk	Sloop of war	Peter Jacuqet	Fort Niagara, New York	Thirteen Colonies	For Royal Navy.
Unknown date	Nassau	Third rate	John May	Amsterdam	Dutch Republic	For Dutch Navy.
Unknown date	Neptune	East Indiaman			Great Britain	For British East India Company.
Unknown date	Onandaga	Sloop of war		Oswego, New York	Thirteen Colonies	For Royal Navy.
Unknown date	Principe	Principe-class ship of the line	Juan Donesteve	Guarnizo	Spain	For Spanish Navy.
Unknown date	Prinses Royaal	Third rate	John May	Amsterdam	Dutch Republic	For Dutch Navy.
Unknown date	Snowshoe	snow		Fort Niagara, New York	Thirteen Colonies	For Royal Navy.
Unknown date	Name unknown	Sailing ship		Dublin	Ireland	For private owner.
