= Othello (disambiguation) =

Othello (full title: The Tragedy of Othello, the Moor of Venice) is a tragic play by William Shakespeare, believed to have been written in 1603.

Othello or Otello may also refer to:

== People with the name ==
- Othello Henderson (born 1972), American football player
- Othello Hunter (born 1986), American-Liberian basketball player
- Otello Profazio (born 1934), Italian cantastorie and folk singer-songwriter
- Nunzio Otello Francesco Gioacchino (Born 1792), Napoleonic Neapolitan Mameluke of Joachim Murat

== Places ==
=== Geography ===
- Othello, New Jersey, an unincorporated community
- Othello, Washington, a U.S. city
- Othello, British Columbia, a locality in Canada

=== Buildings and structures ===
- Othello Air Force Station, a closed United States Air Force near Othello, Washington
- Othello Castle, Cyprus
- Othello High School, Othello, Washington
- Othello station, a Link light rail station in Seattle, Washington
- Othello Tunnels, rail tunnels (and nickname) of Coquihalla Canyon Provincial Park, British Columbia, Canada

== Arts, entertainment, and media ==
=== Films ===
- Otello (1906 film), an Italian silent film
- Othello (1922 film), a film starring Emil Jannings
- Othello (1951 film), a film starring Orson Welles
- Othello (1955 film), a Soviet film by Sergei Yutkevich
- Othello (Wednesday Theatre), a 1965 telefilm broadcast on the ABC as part of Wednesday Theatre
- Othello (1965 British film), a film starring Laurence Olivier and Maggie Smith
- Othello (1980 film), a film starring Yaphet Kotto
- Othello (1981 TV film), a TV adaptation starring Anthony Pedley and Anthony Hopkins
- The Tragedy of Othello, the Moor of Venice (film), a 1981 film starring William Marshall and Ron Moody
- Otello (1986 film), a film by Franco Zeffirelli
- Othello (1990 film), a film starring Willard White and Ian McKellen
- Othello (1995 film), a film starring Laurence Fishburne and Kenneth Branagh
- Othello (2001 film), a made-for-television film starring Keeley Hawes and Eamonn Walker
- Othello (2017 film), an Assamese language drama film

=== Gaming ===
- Reversi, a board game better known as Othello
  - Othello (1981 video game), a 1981 Atari 2600 game
  - Othello (1984 video game), a 1984 arcade game
  - Othello (1986 video game), a 1986 NES game
  - Computer Othello, computer architecture encompassing computer hardware and computer software capable of playing the game Othello
  - Othello Quarterly, a U.S. magazine for the board game
- Othello Multivision, a cartridge-based video game console and Sega SG-1000 clone

=== Manga ===
- Othello (Satomi Ikezawa manga), a 2001–2004 shoujo manga
- Othello (Toui Hasumi manga), a 2007 manga

=== Music ===
- Otello (Rossini), an 1816 opera by Gioachino Rossini
- Otello, an 1887 opera by Giuseppe Verdi
- Othello (Dvořák), an 1892 concert overture by Antonín Dvořák
- "Othello" is the opening song on the Dance Hall Crashers' debut album of the same name (1990)

=== Other uses in arts, entertainment, and media ===
- Othello (ballet), a ballet by Lar Lubovitch
- Othello (character), the protagonist of Shakespeare's 1603 play and Cinthio's story
- Othello (Orson Welles stage production) (1951)
- Othello (comedy duo), a Japanese comedy duo
- Othello (paintings), a series of paintings by Nabil Kanso
- "Un Capitano Moro" (English translation: "A Moorish Captain"), a story by Cinthio, first published in 1565, which Shakespeare adapted as a 1603 play
- Othello (Corinth), an 1884 painting by Lovis Corinth

== Brands and enterprises ==
- Otello Corporation, a Norwegian Internet company, formerly known as Opera Software ASA.

== Ships ==
- Othello (1781 ship) or Ortello, a slave ship
- Othello (1786 ship), a slave ship
- List of ships named Othello

== See also ==
- O (2001 film), a modern film by Tim Blake Nelson, adapted from Shakespeare's Othello
- Omkara (film), a 2006 Indian film adapted from Shakespeare's Othello
- Otelo (disambiguation)
