= List of ships named Othello =

Several vessels have borne the name Othello for the character Othello. Two of these ships, in the late 18th Century, were slave ships:

- Othello (1781 ship) (or Ortello), was launched at Liverpool in 1769, possibly under the name Preston. She made two voyages in the African slave trade in 1781 and 1782. She was lost at Tortola in 1783, during the second voyage.
- Othello (1786 ship) was launched in 1786 at Liverpool for the African slave trade. She made some five voyages before she burnt off the coast of Africa in 1796.
