= John Van Eyssen =

South African actor, literary agent, and film executive (1922–1995)

- Van Eyssen in Dracula (1958)
- Born: Matthew John Du Toit Van Eyssen; 19 March 1922; Fauresmith, Free State, Union of South Africa
- Died: 13 November 1995 (aged 73); London, England
- Education: Royal Central School of Speech and Drama
- Occupations: Actor; literary agent; producer
- Years active: 1950–1991
- Spouse: Shirley Goulden (divorced 1977)
- Partner: Ingrid Bergman (late 1970's-early '80s)
- Children: David Van Eyssen
- Military career
- Allegiance: South Africa
- Branch: South African Army
- Conflicts: World War II

Matthew John Du Toit Van Eyssen (born 19 March 1922 – 13 November 1995) was a South African actor, literary agent, and film production executive who spent most of his professional life in the United Kingdom. He served as the head of the Grade Organisation’s literary agency, and was later the UK Managing Director for Columbia Pictures.

== Life and career ==
Van Eyssen was born in the town of Fauresmith, Free State (South Africa) in 1922. He served in the South African Army during the Second World War. He moved to the UK after his discharge to study at the Central School of Speech and Drama.

=== Actor ===
Eyman was a member of the Royal Shakespeare Company during its 1948 season. He played Rosencrantz in Hamlet, opposite Paul Scofield as the title character. In 1951, he played Cassio in Orson Welles' 1951 production of Othello.

In 1951 and in 1954 he played the role of Lucifer in the York Cycle of Mystery Plays, first revived in 1951 as part of the Festival of Britain.

Van Eyssen appeared in films from 1950 as well as on stage (including Hammer Films' Quatermass 2 and Four-Sided Triangle), but he achieved his greatest fame as an actor when he portrayed Jonathan Harker in the Hammer Film Productions version of Dracula (released as Horror of Dracula in the US) in 1958.

=== Agent and executive ===
He left acting in 1961 to become head of the Grade Organisation literary agency. His subsequent clients were Franco Zeffirelli, Tennessee Williams and Arthur Miller. He left the business in 1965 to work for the UK division of Columbia Pictures, eventually becoming Managing Director in July 1969. Among the films he oversaw were A Man for All Seasons (1966), Born Free (1966), Georgy Girl (1966), To Sir, with Love (1967), The Taming of The Shrew (1967), and Oliver! (1968). Both Oliver! and A Man for All Seasons won Best Picture Academy Awards. In 1970, he was promoted to Worldwide Head of Production (ex-USA) and moved to New York.

After his tenure at Columbia, Van Eyssen became an independent producer, returning to the UK in 1991 to establish Britain's premier showcase for talented young filmmakers, the Chelsea Film Festival.

== Personal life ==
Van Eyssen was longtime companion of Ingrid Bergman in the years before her death in 1982. His son, David Van Eyssen, is a visual artist, and a producer-director known for the science fiction streaming series RCVR.

=== Death ===
Aged 73, Van Eyssen died in Fulham, London on 13 November 1995.

== Filmography ==
Van Eyssen (left) with Christopher Lee (right), in a lobby card for Dracula.

=== Film ===
| Year | Title | Role | Notes |
|---|---|---|---|
| 1950 | The Angel with the Trumpet | Albert Drauffer | |
| 1951 | Murder in the Cathedral | Priest | |
| 1953 | Four Sided Triangle | Robin | |
| 1953 | Three Steps in the Dark | Henry Burgoyne | |
| 1954 | The Men of Sherwood Forest | Will Scarlett | |
| 1955 | The Cockleshell Heroes | Marine Bradley | |
| 1957 | Brothers in Law | Forbes | Uncredited |
| 1957 | The Traitor | LT. Grant | |
| 1957 | Quatermass 2 | The PRO | |
| 1957 | Account Rendered | Clive Franklyn | |
| 1957 | The One That Got Away | German Prisoner | |
| 1958 | The Whole Truth | Archer | |
| 1958 | Dracula | Jonathan Harker | |
| 1958 | Moment of Indiscretion | Corby | |
| 1959 | Carlton-Browne of the F.O. | Hewitt | |
| 1959 | Carry On Nurse | Surgeon Stephens | |
| 1959 | I'm All Right Jack | Reporter | |
| 1959 | Blind Date | Inspector Westover | |
| 1960 | Make Mine Mink | Rowson | Uncredited |
| 1960 | The Criminal | Formby | |
| 1961 | Exodus | Detective | Uncredited |
| 1961 | A Story of David | Joab | |
| 1963 | Like Two Drops of Water | | Uncredited |

=== Television ===
| Year | Title | Role | Notes |
|---|---|---|---|
| 1951-56 | BBC Sunday Night Theatre | Various roles | 5 episodes |
| 1954 | The Three Musketeers | Duke of Buckingham | 3 episodes |
| 1956-60 | ITV Television Playhouse | Prof. Craig, Philip | Episode: "Ever Since Paradise" & "The Two Wise Virgins of Hove" |
| 1957 | The Errol Flynn Theatre | Lover | Episode: "Love Token" |
| 1957 | Overseas Press Club – Exclusive! | Capt. Bauer | Episode: "My Favourite Kidnapper" |
| 1957 | O.S.S. | Secretary | Episode: "Operation Big House" |
| 1958 | The New Adventures of Charlie Chan | Insp. Pierre Renal | Episode: "The Noble Art of Murder" |
| 1958 | Ivanhoe | Sir Alistair | Episode: "Rinaldo" |
| 1959 | The Verdict Is Yours | Defence Counsel | Episodes: "The Case of the Missing Golf Funds: Parts 1 & 2" |
| 1959 | Charlesworth | Stanton | Episode: "Long Hot Spell" |
| 1959 | The Man Who Finally Died | Sgt. Hirsch | Episodes: "The Gloves" & "The Clinic" |
| 1959 | Interpol Calling | Capt. Flormann | Episode: "Air Switch" |
| 1960 | ITV Play of the Week | President | Episode: "Carrington V.C." |
| 1960 | The Four Just Men | Raoul | Episode: "The Grandmother" |
| 1960-61 | The Edgar Wallace Mystery Theater | Merril, John Mandle | Episodes: "Marriage of Convenience" & "Partners in Crime" |
| 1961 | Drama 61-67 | Stephen Axley | Episode: "Journey to Nowhere" |

== Partial stage credits ==
| Year | Title | Role | Venue(s) | Ref. |
|---|---|---|---|---|
| 1947 | French Without Tears | | Summer Theatre, Frinton-on-Sea | |
| 1947-48 | Othello | | Bristol Old Vic, Bristol | |
| 1948 | King John | | Royal Shakespeare Theatre, Stratford-upon-Avon | |
| 1948 | The Merchant of Venice | | Royal Shakespeare Theatre, Stratford-upon-Avon | |
| 1948 | Hamlet | Rosencrantz | Royal Shakespeare Theatre, Stratford-upon-Avon | |
| 1948 | The Taming of the Shrew | Haberdasher | Royal Shakespeare Theatre, Stratford-upon-Avon | |
| 1948 | The Winter's Tale | | Royal Shakespeare Theatre, Stratford-upon-Avon | |
| 1948 | Troilus and Cressida | Menelaus | Royal Shakespeare Theatre, Stratford-upon-Avon | |
| 1948 | Othello | | Royal Shakespeare Theatre, Stratford-upon-Avon | |
| 1948-49 | The Miser | Cleante | New Theatre, London | |
| 1949-50 | Hamlet | Player King | New Theatre, London | |
| 1949-50 | Love's Labour's Lost | Dumaine | New Theatre, London | |
| 1950-51 | Storks Don’t Talk | Carlo Cavendish | UK tour | |
| 1951 | Othello | Cassio | Theatre Royal, Newcastle | |
| 1951 | Othello | Cassio | UK tour | |
| 1951 | Othello | Cassio | The Other Palace, London | |
