= Otelo =

Otelo may refer to:

== People ==
- Grande Otelo (1915–1993), Brazilian actor
- Otelo Ocampos (born 1983), Paraguayan footballer
- Otelo Saraiva de Carvalho (1936–2021), Portuguese military officer and presidential candidate

== Other ==
- OTELO, an astronomical object survey
- Grande Otelo, a Brazilian film award
- Otelo Burning, a South African film

== See also ==
- Othello (disambiguation)
