= HMS Thunderer (1760) =

Ship of the line of the Royal Navy

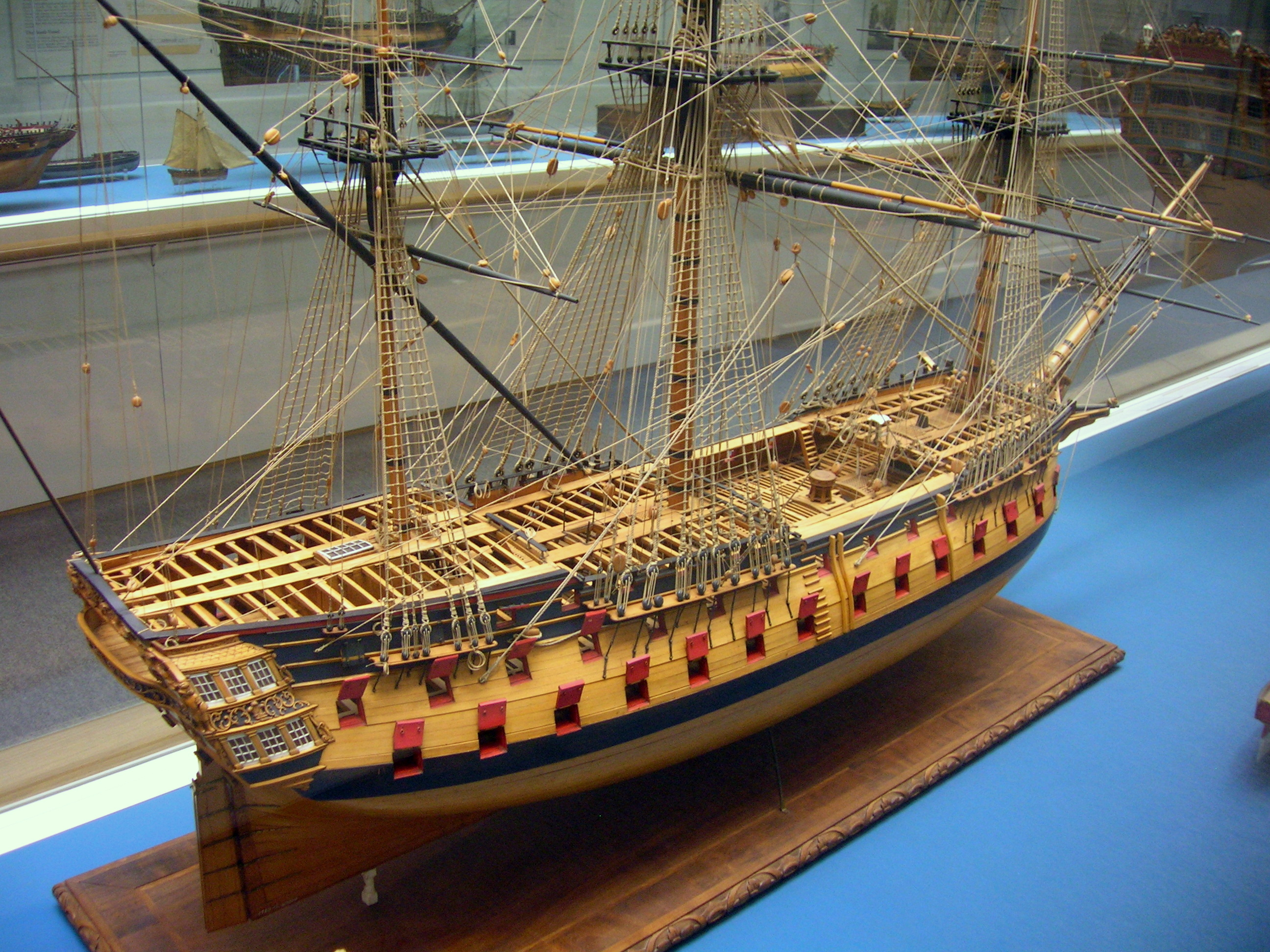
- Model of a 74-gun ship, 3rd rate, circa 1760. Thought to be either HMS Hercules or HMS Thunderer from 1760.

History

Great Britain
- Name: Thunderer
- Ordered: 15 July 1756
- Builder: Woolwich Dockyard
- Launched: 19 March 1760
- Fate: Wrecked on 10 October 1780

General characteristics
- Class & type: Hercules-class ship of the line
- Tons burthen: 160933/94 (bm)
- Length: 166 ft 6 in (50.75 m) (gundeck)
- Beam: 46 ft 6 in (14.17 m)
- Depth of hold: 19 ft 9 in (6.02 m)
- Propulsion: Sails
- Sail plan: Full-rigged ship
- Armament: 74 guns: Lower gundeck: 28 × 32 pdrs; Upper gundeck: 28 × 18 pdrs; Quarter deck: 14 × 9 pdrs; Forecastle: 4 × 9 pdrs

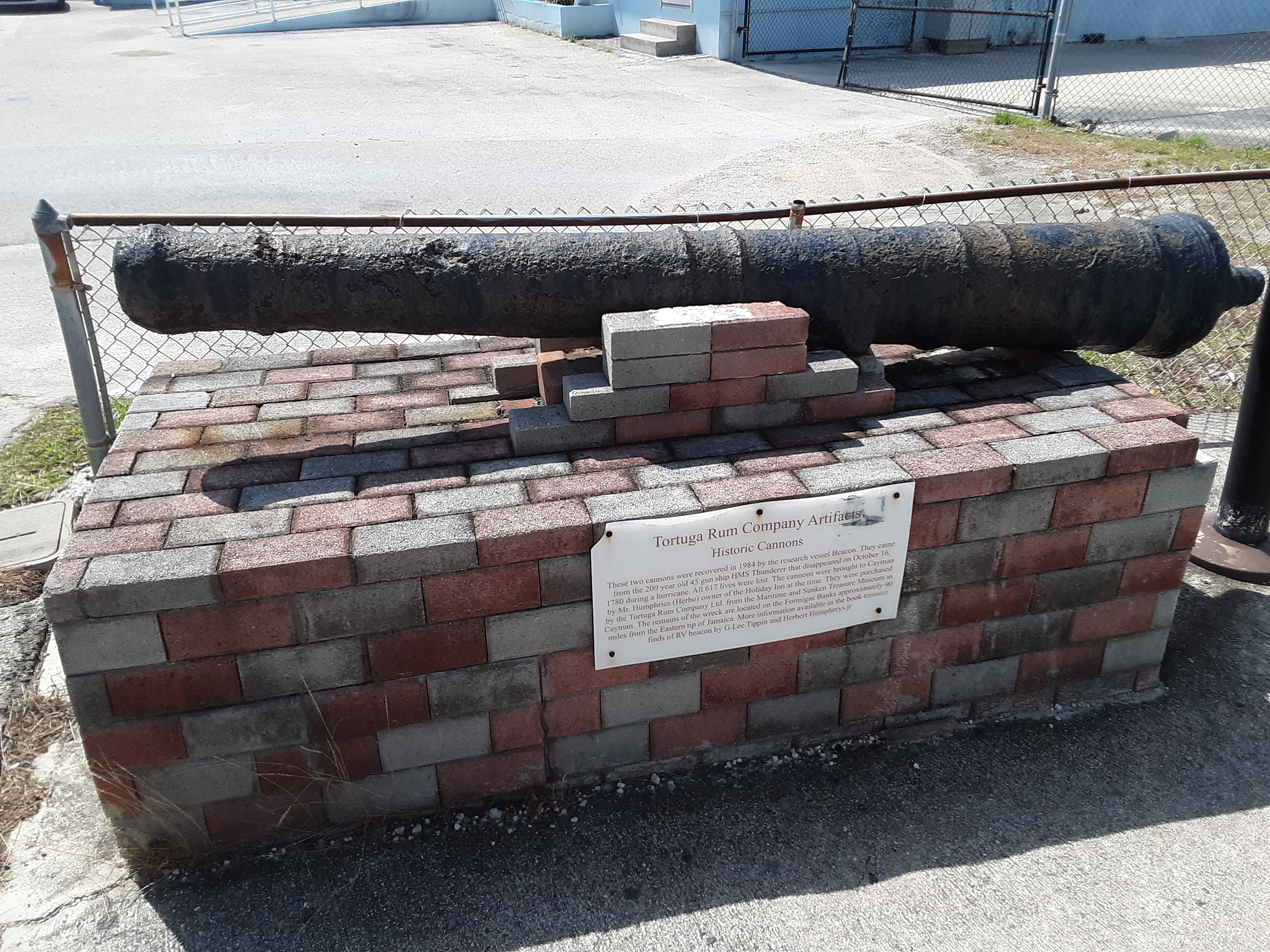
One of two cannons attributed to HMS Thunderer, displayed at a rum cake factory on Grand Cayman Island

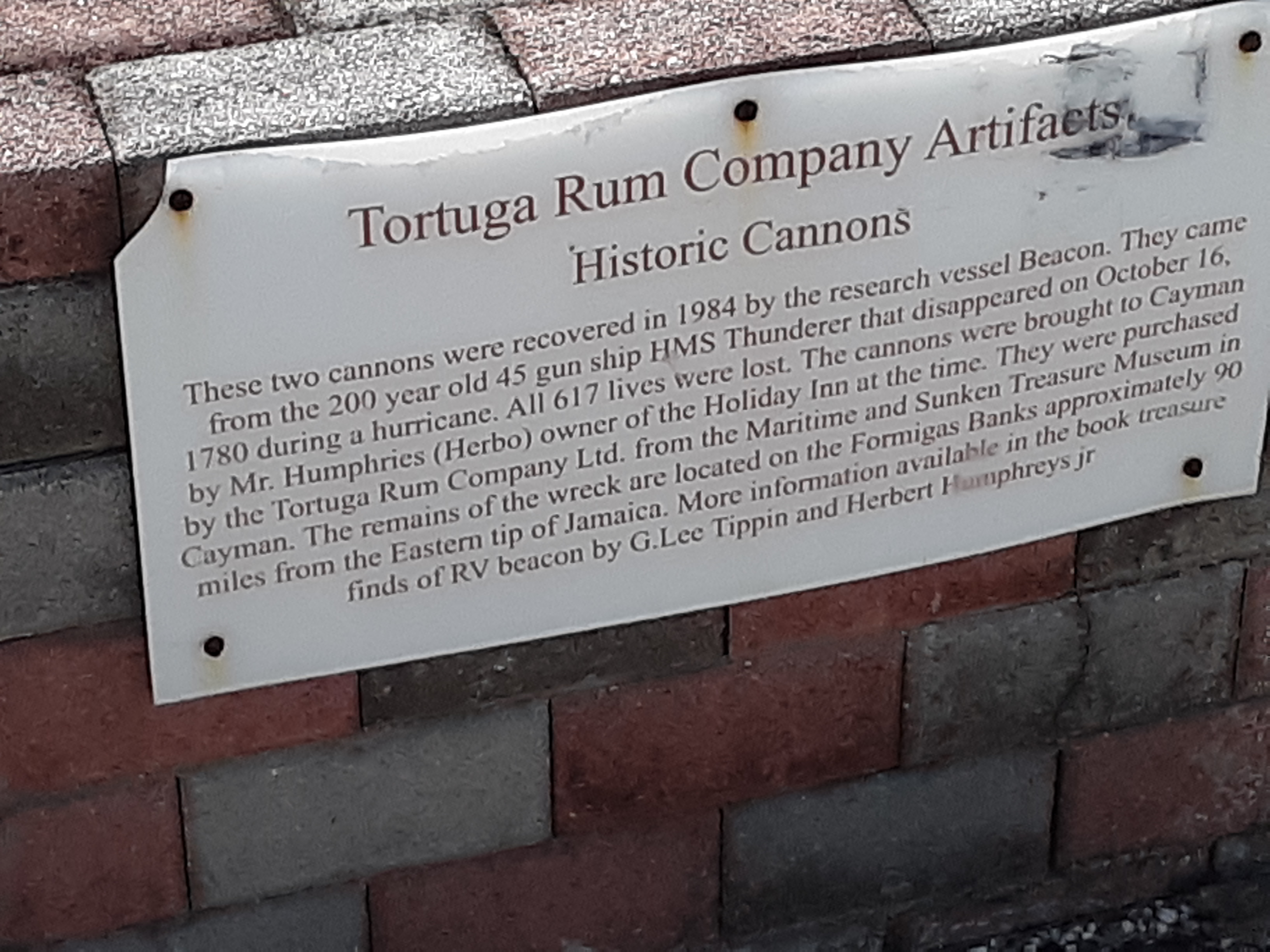
Descriptive plaque at a cannon attributed to Thunderer

HMS Thunderer was a 74-gun third rate ship of the line of the Royal Navy, launched on 19 March 1760 at Woolwich. She earned a battle honour in a single-ship action off Cadiz with the French ship Achille (64 guns) in 1761, during the Seven Years' War.

She foundered in the Great Hurricane of 1780 in the West Indies, reportedly 90 miles east of Jamaica on the Formigas Banks with the loss of all 617 on board. Among the lost sailors were the Captain, Robert Boyle-Walsingham (1736–1780), and Midshipman Nathaniel Cook (1764–1780), the second child of Captain James Cook.

Two cannons attributed to the ship are displayed at a rum cake factory on Grand Cayman Island. A plaque states that they were recovered in 1984 by the research vessel Beacon.
