= Optical System for Imaging and low Resolution Integrated Spectroscopy =

Optical spectrometer in the Canaries, Spain

The Optical System for Imaging and low Resolution Integrated Spectroscopy (OSIRIS) is an optical spectrometer at the Gran Telescopio Canarias (GTC) in Spain. It was the first instrument in operation at the GTC. OSIRIS's key scientific project is OTELO.

Sensitive in the wavelength range from 365 through 1000 nm, OSIRIS is a multiple purpose instrument for imaging and low-resolution long slit and multiple object spectroscopy (MOS). Imaging can be done using broad-band filters or narrow-band tunable filters with FWHM ranging from 0.2 to 0.9 nm at 365 nm, through 0.9 to 1.2 at 1000 nm. OSIRIS observing modes include also fast photometry and spectroscopy. OSIRIS's field of view is 8.5×8.5 arcminutes and the maximum nominal spectral resolution is 5000 for a slit width of 0.6 arcsec. MOS incorporates detector charge shuffling co-ordinated with telescope nodding for an excellent sky subtraction. The use of tunable filters is a completely new feature in 8 to 10 m class telescopes that will allow observing the very faint and distant emission line objects.
