= Tarleton (1780 ship) =

British merchant vessel and slave transport (1780–1788)

History

France
- Builder: France
- Launched: 1778
- Captured: 1778

United Kingdom
- Name: Tarleton
- Owner: Tarleton & Backhouse, Liverpool
- Acquired: 1779 by purchase of a prize
- Fate: Wrecked 28 November 1788

General characteristics
- Tons burthen: 300, or 342, or 35268/94, or 400 (bm)
- Length: 97 ft 3 in (29.6 m),
- Beam: 28 ft 6 in (8.7 m) (above wales); 29 ft 0 in (8.8 m) (below wales)
- Depth of hold: 5 ft 7 in (1.7 m)
- Sail plan: Brigantine, later Full-rigged ship
- Complement: 30 (1779)
- Armament: 1799: 14 × 6&4-pounder guns; 1780 18 × 6-pounder guns
- Notes: Two decks and three masts

Tarleton was built in France under another name in 1778 (or simply captured then). The partnership of the Tarletons and Backhouse purchased her in 1779. She first traded as a West Indiaman, sailing between Liverpool and Jamaica. She then became a slave ship in the triangular trade in enslaved people. She made three complete voyages from Liverpool transporting slaves and was lost in November 1788 at the outset of her fourth voyage.

== Merchantman ==
The High Court of Admiralty condemned her on 4 November 1778 and she was made free on 5 February 1779 at Liverpool.

Captain Joseph Thomas acquired a letter of marque on 1 March 1779. Her owners were John Daniel Backhouse and Thomas Tarleton Tarleton.

Missing pages in extant issues of Lloyd's Register (LR) mean that Tarleton first appeared in Lloyd's Register in 1781. She then made several voyages as a West Indiaman.

| Year | Master | Owner | Trade | Source & notes |
|---|---|---|---|---|
| 1781 | J.Taylor | Tarleton & Co. | Liverpool–Jamaica | LR; good repair 1780 |
| 1782 | J.Taylor | Tarleton & Co. | Liverpool–Saint Kitts | LR; good repair 1780 |
| 1783 | J.Taylor; T.Heston | Tarleton & Co. | Liverpool–Saint Kitts | LR; good repair 1780 & 1782 |
| 1784 | T.Heston; P.Fairweather | Tarleton & Co. | Liverpool–Saint Lucia; Liverpool–Africa | LR; good repair 1780 & 1782 |

== Slave trading voyages ==
First voyage transporting slaves (1784–1785): Captain Patrick Fairweather was an experienced captain of slave ships. He had made his first voyage to Calabar in 1755, probably as an apprentice on Dalrymple while still a teenager. His first command had been in 1768.

Fairweather left Liverpool on 24 March 1784, bound for the Bight of Biafra and Gulf of Guinea islands to acquire captives. He gathered the captives at Calabar and then delivered them to Grenada, arriving on 3 February 1785. Fairweather had embarked 557 captives and disembarked 510, for a loss rate of 8.4%. Her crew of 38 suffered three deaths. Tarleton left Grenada 7 March and arrived at Liverpool 21 April 1785.

Second voyage transporting slaves (1785–1786): Fairweather sailed from Liverpool on 23 June 1785 bound for the Bight of Biafra and Gulf of Guinea islands to acquire captives. She arrived at Calabar on 14 August. She stayed there 180 days. Tarleton left on 20 March 1786. Tarleton delivered the captives to Dominica, where she arrived on 9 May. She had embarked 440 captives and disembarked 360, for a loss rate of 18.2%. She also had 46 crew men, five of whom died on the voyage. At some point in the voyage Captain Thomas Smith replaced Fairweather. Tarleton left Dominica on 4 July, and arrived at Liverpool on 5 September. When she arrived at Liverpool she brought with her 57 puncheons and one butt (roughly 490 litres) of palm oil, 50 barrels of pepper, 105 ivory tusks, eight tons of redwood, and cargo from the West Indies.

A list of cargoes taken up at Old Calabar between 1785 and 1788 states that on one voyage Tarleton loaded 440 captives, an estimated 1,512 pounds (686 kg) of ivory, (Note: The records specify "elephants' teeth", which the authors of the book converted at 14.4lbs/"tooth".) 4,915 gals of palm oil, 9,800 lbs of pepper, and 17,920 lbs of redwood.

While Fairweather and Tarleton were at Calabar, Banastre, another vessel under the ownership of the Tarleton-Backhouse partnership, arrived there. Fairweather sent Banastre, Thomas Smith, master, to the coast of Cameroon. When she arrived there some natives in a canoe approached to trade with her, but were warned off by a shot from another slave vessel, Othello, (Note: Othello was a ship of 122 tons (bm), launched at Liverpool in 1786.) that killed one of the natives. Captain James McGauley, of Othello, had ordered the shot fired because the natives on that coast owed him a debt and he had declared that he would permit no trade until they had paid him. In 1793 the case of Tarleton and others vs. McGauley came to trial with the plaintiffs suing McGauley for loss of trade. (Note: In the description of the case, Banastre is rendered as Banister.) The court found for the plaintiffs, establishing that it is a tort "to cause damage to a person by maliciously using any unlawful means, (e.g. fraud, or threats of assault), to induce anyone to abstain from entering into a contract with him."

After Parliament passed the Registry Act (1786), the Tarletons and Backhouse twice registered her at Liverpool: on 13 November 1786 (Liverpool; №154/86), and then on 16 October 1788 (Liverpool; №79/88).

Third voyage transporting slaves (1786–1788): Tarleton's master was J. Smith, and her trade was Liverpool-Africa. Alternatively, her master may have been Thomas Smith, replaced by Patrick Fairweather. She left Liverpool on 26 August 1786 and left Calabar after 281 days. (However, the same source states that Tarleton and Fairweather left Liverpool on 25 December 1786, which is more consistent with having arrived in Liverpool in September, and is also consistent with the data in the Trans-Atlantic Slave Trade Database.) Tarleton left Africa on 19 February 1788 and arrived at Dominica on 11 May. When she arrived she was carrying 308 captives, 45 ivory tusks, 94 puncheons, 8 butts, and 15 tierces of palm oil, 50 tons of redwood, and 60 barrels of Guinea pepper. She had started with 371 captives, and another three to five captives died after arrival, for a loss rate of 18.6%. She left Dominica on 24 June and arrived at Liverpool on 24 June with 80 tons of redwood and cargo from the West Indies. Another account describes her cargo from Africa as 377 captives, an estimated 648 lbs. of ivory, 9,600 gallons of palm oil, 11,760 lbs. of pepper, and 112,000 lbs of redwood.

== Loss ==
Tarleton, Christian, master, was on her way to Africa on her fourth slaving voyage when she foundered on 28 November 1788 off St David's Head. Her crew was saved. She had left Liverpool 10 November 1788. The Liverpool Registry records her as having been lost off the coast of Wales, and gives a date of 26 May 1789, but this date may represent a declaration rather than the date of the actual loss.
