= Action of 17 July 1761 =

1761 naval battle of the Seven Years' War

Coordinates: 36.502°N 6.389°W

- Part of the Seven Years' War
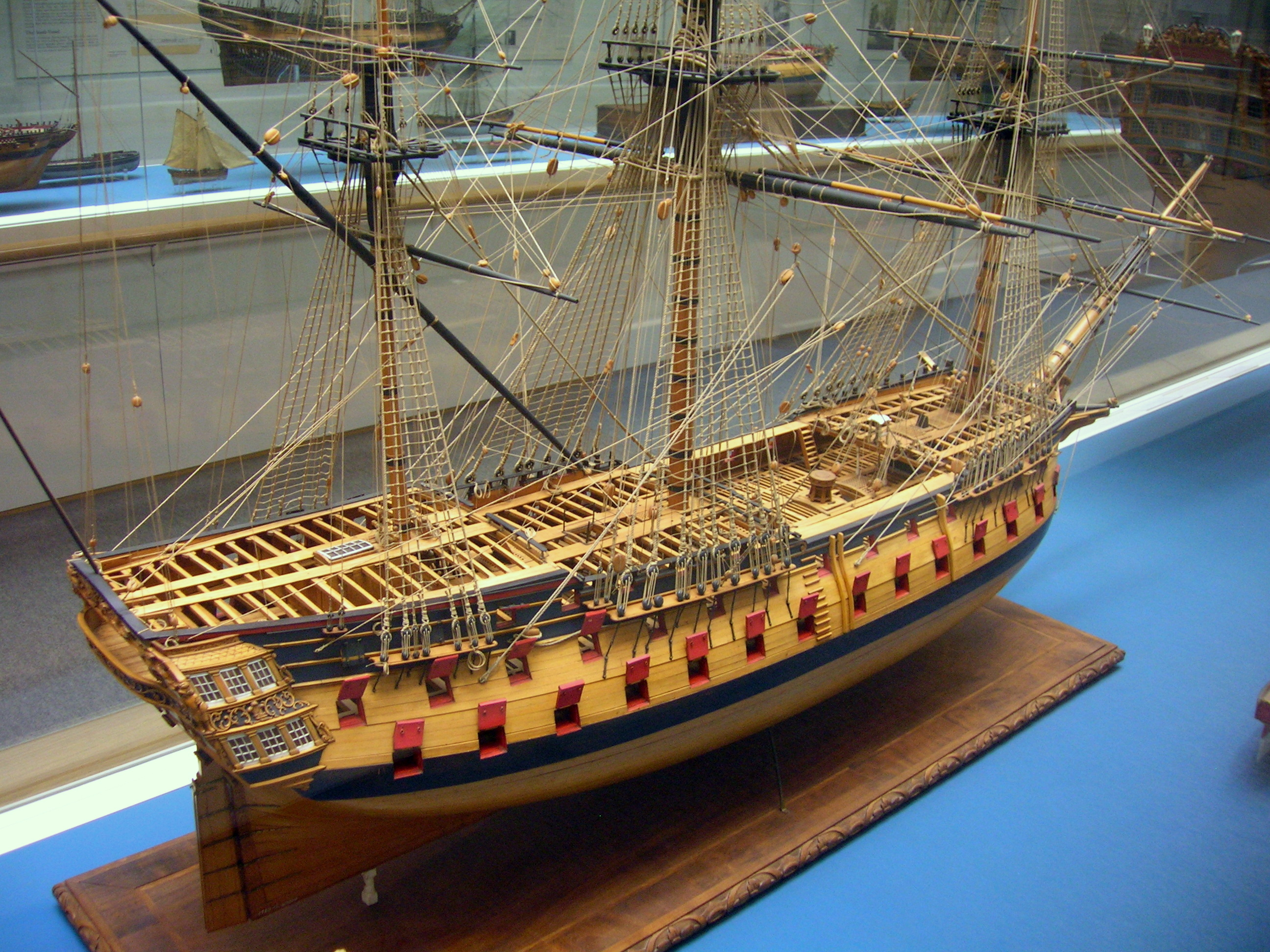
- Possible model of HMS Thunderer
Date	14–17 July 1761
Location	Off Cádiz, Atlantic Ocean
Result	British victory

Belligerents
Great Britain	France

Commanders and leaders
Charles Proby	Unknown

Strength
2 ships of the line 1 frigate 1 sloop	1 ship of the line 1 frigate

Casualties and losses
17 killed 114 wounded	1 ship of the line captured 1 frigate captured

The action of 17 July 1761 was a naval engagement fought off the Spanish port of Cádiz between a British Royal Navy squadron and a smaller French Navy squadron during the Seven Years' War. British fleets had achieved dominance in European waters over the French following heavy defeats of French fleets in 1759. To maintain this control, British battle squadrons were stationed off French ports and ports in neutral but French-supporting Spain, which sheltered French warships. In 1761, two French ships, the 64-gun ship of the line Achille and the 32-gun frigate Bouffone, were blockaded in the principal Spanish naval base of Cádiz, on the Southern Atlantic coast of Spain.

Achille had departed the French Atlantic base of Brest in March, fighting through the blockade of that port, and was then trapped in Cádiz by a British squadron detached from the Mediterranean Fleet based at Gibraltar comprising ships of the line HMS Thunderer and HMS Modeste, frigate HMS Thetis and sloop HMS Favourite, under the command of Captain Charles Proby on Thunderer. When the French ship attempted to leave, Proby gave chase, eventually catching them and bringing them to battle. Thunderer suffered heavy losses when a cannon exploded, but Proby was able to get his ship alongside Achille and capture the ship in a boarding action while Thetis and Modeste captured Bouffone.

== Action ==
=== Background ===
In 1759, the French Navy suffered heavy losses in the defeats at the Battle of Lagos and the Battle of Quiberon Bay, which gave the Royal Navy superiority in the Atlantic. To retain this advantage, the Royal Navy stationed squadrons off the principal French naval bases in a close blockade strategy; French ships periodically attempted to break through this blockade to operate against British commerce. On 9 March 1761, the squadron off the port of Brest in Brittany, led by Commodore Matthew Buckle, sighted a French ship of the line and a frigate sailing from the port. Buckle ordered the 60-gun British ship HMS Rippon under Captain Edward Jekyll to pursue the French, Jekyll chasing the enemy ships into the Bay of Biscay. The French ships were the 64-gun Achille and frigate Bouffone.

Although the French ships outdistanced Rippon, Jekyll sighted them again the following afternoon and at 21:30 successfully drew alongside Achille, opening fire at close range. The wind was strong, and the seas were rough; neither ship could easily use their lower gun deck without water sloshing in through the gunports. During the exchange of fire, one of the guns on Rippon exploded, causing heavy casualties among the gun crews. Jekyll was forced to order most of the forward gunports closed as a consequence, but fire from Rippon was able to knock away the foreyard and foretop mast on Achille. This caused Rippon to pull ahead of Achille, and Jekyll brought his ship into the wind in readiness for an attack by the French ship. Achille, however, passed by the stern of Rippon, missing the opportunity to rake the British ship. With the French now pulling away, Jekyll ordered his crew to wear around and follow Achille, but the damage to the British ship was too extensive, and Achille could escape in the darkness.

Having escaped the blockade, Achille and Bouffone cruised in the Atlantic for several months before entering the neutral but friendly Spanish port of Cádiz. There, they were discovered in July, and a small British squadron was sent to blockade the harbour in anticipation of Achille returning to sea.

=== Battle ===
The British blockade squadron stationed off Cádiz comprised the 74-gun HMS Thunderer under Captain Charles Proby, the 64-gun HMS Modeste under Captain Robert Boyle-Walsingham, the 32-gun frigate HMS Thetis under Captain John Moutray and the sloop HMS Favourite under Commander Philemon Pownall. This force patrolled off the port in early summer, discovering on 14 July that Achille and Bouffone had recently sailed unopposed. Proby ordered his squadron to search for the French ships, discovering them on 16 July approximately 18 miles (29 km) southwest of Cádiz. A chase ensued, with the French sailing northwest into the Gulf of Cádiz. However, Proby's ships were faster, and Thunderer reached Achille on the morning of 17 July, approximately 57 miles (92 km) northwest of Cádiz.

Thunderer opened fire on Achille as the ships came within range, the ships of the line exchanging broadsides. As the action intensified, a cannon on the upper deck of Thunderer suddenly burst, the explosion killing and wounding dozens of sailors. In the aftermath of the blast, Proby, who had been injured in the hand, brought Thunderer alongside Achille and led a boarding action which captured Achille. Nearby, Thetis successfully brought Bouffone to action, holding up the French frigate long enough that Modeste could come within range. With his frigate heavily outgunned, the French captain surrendered.

=== Aftermath ===
Proby brought the squadron and its prizes back to Gibraltar, where the wounded were treated in the city's hospitals. British casualties were listed as 17 killed and 114 wounded, all on Thunderer and most from the gun explosion. Thunderer had also suffered severe damage to the masts and rigging from a French shot. The only other heavily engaged British ship was Thetis, which had also suffered damage to masts and rigging but received no casualties. According to Proby's dispatch to the Admiralty, no record of French losses was made in the aftermath of the battle.

== Bibliography ==
- Clowes, William Laird (1997) [1900]. The Royal Navy, A History from the Earliest Times to 1900, Volume III. London: Chatham Publishing. ISBN 1-86176-012-4.
