= Murder in the Cathedral (2020 film) =

- Poster
- Croatian: Umorstvo u katedrali
- Directed by: Matija Pisačić; Tvrtko Raspolić
- Screenplay by: Jasna Žmak
- Based on: Pustolovine Glorije Scott by Mima Simić
- Produced by: Dijana Mlađenović
- Starring: Jadranka Krajina; Andy Tomlinson; Scott Fortney
- Music by: Noa Pisačić
- Production companies: Kinematograf (Croatia); Papa Films (Serbia)
- Release date: 2020
- Running time: 15 minutes
- Countries: Croatia; Serbia
- Language: English

Murder in the Cathedral (Croatian: Umorstvo u katedrali) is a 2020 Croatian-Serbian animated short by Matija Pisačić and Tvrko Raspolić, produced by Kinematograf and Papa Films. Described as an LGBT parody of Sherlock Holmes, the script was written by Jasna Žmak on the basis of a book by Mima Simić.

== Development ==
The collection of short stories by Mima Simić, Pustolovine Glorije Scott (English: Adventures of Gloria Scott), caught the interest of Croatian animators for a long time, and was initially developed by the animator Magda Dulčić, who was unsuccessful in securing funds. Producer Dijana Mladenović eventually offered the project to Matija Pisačić, who suggested an original script based on the character. It is animated in traditional 2D form, but with 3D elements. The production began in 2009.

== Synopsis ==
The short takes place in Victorian London, with amateur detective Gloria Scott (originally a character from one of Arthur Conan Doyle's short stories) solving crimes alongside her sidekick Mary. The duo start investigating the murder of a well known historian which occurred in front of the door of their own residence, bringing them to Westminster Cathedral. The short concludes with the phrase “Gloria Scott Will Not Return”.

== Reception ==
The film was shortlisted for 2020 Annecy Animation Festival grand competition. Variety included the short as one of their highlights from the festival. Steve Henderson of Skwigly described the short as a "wonderfully caricatured world" and showing a lot of promise in style and humour, although he also stated that the pointlessly dimwitted nature of the main character was offputting. Arthousestreet stated that the short film easily works as a pilot for a TV series, describing it as a hilarious and digressive spoof. Comic Book Resources included it among the ten best animated shorts at Annecy, and described it as crudely ridiculous and gorgeous to look at, stating that "at times almost plays like a potential pilot for an Adult Swim show". Naama Rak, writing for International Federation of Film Critics, described it as a "very strange piece", with a "very silly type of humour and lots of nudity".
