= Gudrun Ure =

Scottish actress (1926–2024)

- Ure in The Sea Shall Not Have Them, 1954
- Born: Gudrun Henderson Ure; 12 March 1926; Milton of Campsie, Stirlingshire, Scotland
- Died: 14 May 2024 (aged 98); London, England
- Other name: Ann Gudrun
- Years active: 1951–2010
- Spouse: John Ramsay (m. 1964; died 2008)
- Children: 1

Gudrun Henderson Ure (12 March 1926 – 14 May 2024), also known as Ann Gudrun, was a Scottish actress, best known for her portrayal of the title character in the children's television series Super Gran. Ure's career encompassed stage, film, television, and radio, with notable performances including Desdemona in Orson Welles's 1951 stage production of Othello and a role in the 1953 film noir 36 Hours. Her portrayal of the title character in Super Gran, a show that aired from 1985 to 1987, gained international recognition and was exported to sixty countries, winning an International Emmy in 1985.

== Early life ==
Ure was born in Milton of Campsie, Stirlingshire, in 1926, the oldest of three children. She grew up in the Hyndland district of Glasgow, where she was educated at the Laurel Bank School for Girls. Ure began an acting career at Citizens Theatre in Glasgow, including a role as Cleopatra.

== Career ==
In her teens, Ure performed on BBC Radio Scotland's Children's Hour. She first worked as a teacher after leaving school and then acted in repertory theatres in Scotland.

Ure's first major acting part was starring as Desdemona opposite Orson Welles in his 1951 stage production of Othello at St James's Theatre in London. She also appeared in the 1953 film noir 36 Hours under the name Ann Gudrun, due to Orson Welles's inability to pronounce her surname correctly. She played Sergeant Smith in the 1954 film The Diamond. Both 36 Hours and The Diamond were directed by Montgomery Tully.

=== Super Gran ===
Ure's best known role was as the titular Super Gran in the children's TV series produced by Tyne Tees Television for Children's ITV, which originally ran from 1985 to 1987 and was based on a series of books by Forrest Wilson. Twenty-seven episodes were produced; the show was exported to sixty other countries, and won an International Emmy in 1985.

=== Other work ===
Ure also starred in the pilot of a series called Life After Life, written by Yes Minister creator Jonathan Lynn; no further episodes were produced. She also appeared in The 10th Kingdom as Mrs Murray, the mother of Tony Lewis's tyrannical boss and owner of their apartment building, T-Bag and the Pearls of Wisdom, Midsomer Murders, Casualty and The Crow Road. Her final screen credit was a 2009 episode of Casualty.

Ure was in many radio plays in from the 1950s onwards. These included in The Snow Goose with Laurence Olivier and the part of Joan Danbury, the mother of Inspector Gwen Danbury, in the first series of the police drama An Odd Body by Sue Rodwell, broadcast on BBC Radio 4 between 2008 and 2010. She also portrayed the secretary of the central detective in the series Destination Fire (1962–66) on BBC Radio.

In a set of Encyclopædia Britannica-produced educational films about the works of Shakespeare, Ure played the role of Lady Macbeth.

== Personal life and death ==
Ure married John Ramsay in 1964; he died in 2008. She had a stepson. Ure died at her home in London on 14 May 2024, at the age of 98.
