= Murder in the Cathedral (disambiguation) =

Murder in the Cathedral is a play by T. S. Eliot published in 1935.

Murder in the Cathedral may also refer to:

- Murder in the Cathedral (1951 film), a British film adaptation of Eliot's play directed by George Hoellering
- Murder in the Cathedral (1962 film), a performance of Eliot's play on Australian television directed by William Sterling
- Murder in the Cathedral (2020 film), a Croatian-Serbian animated short film directed by Matija Pisačić and Tvrko Raspolić

== See also ==
- Assassinio nella cattedrale, an opera based on Eliot's play
