= HMS Triumph (1764) =

74-gun third rate ship of the line

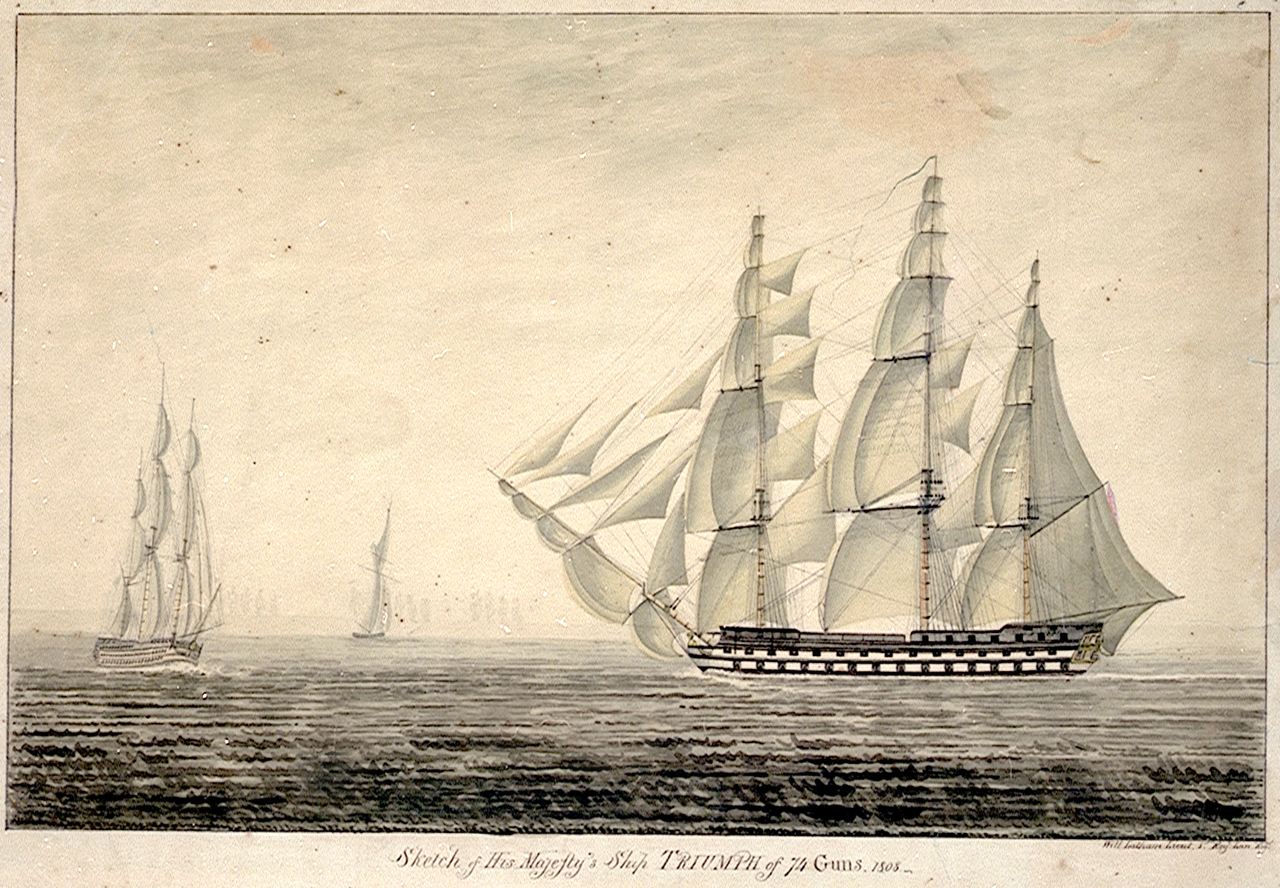
- c. 1820 sketch of Triumph

History

Great Britain
- Name: HMS Triumph
- Ordered: 21 May 1757
- Builder: Woolwich Dockyard
- Launched: 3 March 1764
- Honours and awards: Participated in: Battle of Camperdown; Battle of Cape Finisterre (1805)
- Fate: Broken up, 1850

General characteristics
- Class & type: Valiant-class ship of the line
- Tons burthen: 1825 (bm)
- Length: 172 ft (52 m) (gundeck)
- Beam: 49 ft 8 in (15.14 m)
- Depth of hold: 22 ft 5 in (6.83 m)
- Propulsion: Sails
- Sail plan: Full-rigged ship
- Armament: Gundeck: 28 × 32-pounder guns; Upper gundeck: 30 × 24-pounder guns; QD: 10 × 9-pounder guns; Fc: 2 × 9-pounder guns

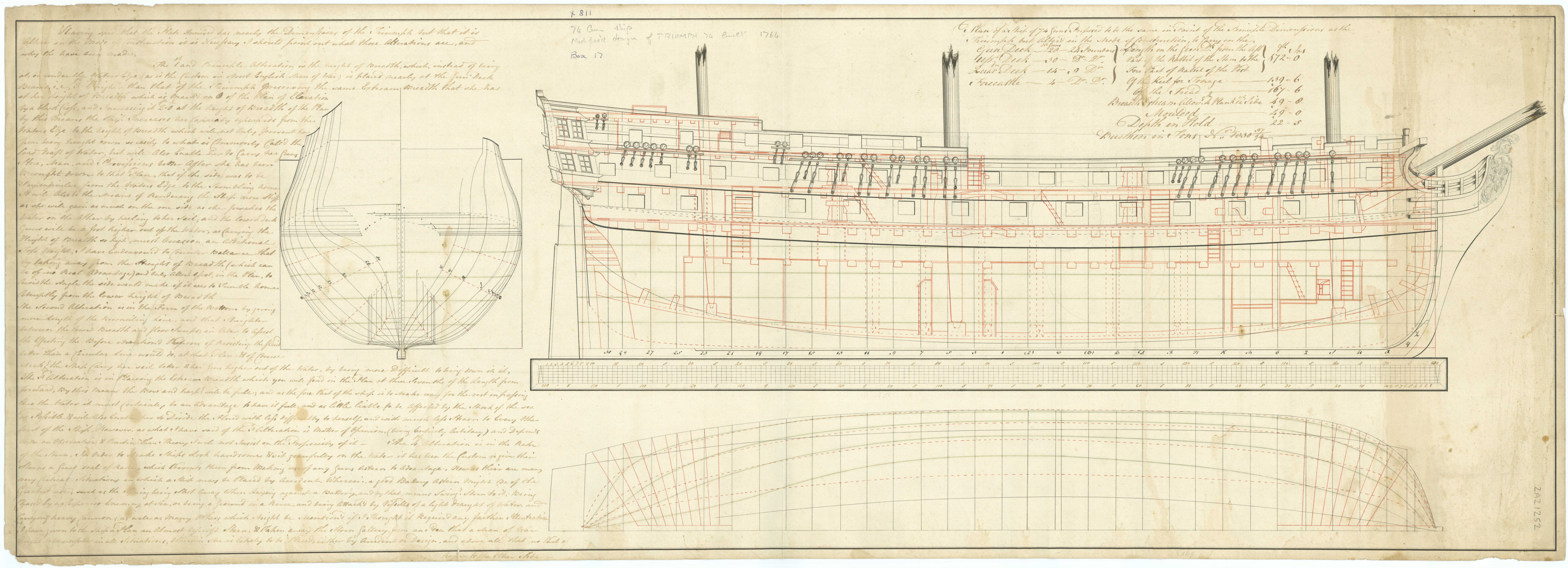
A proposal for a 74-gun two-decker third rate, based on Triumph

HMS Triumph was a 74-gun third-rate ship of the line of the Royal Navy, launched on 3 March 1764 at Woolwich.

In 1797, she took part in the Battle of Camperdown, and in 1805 Triumph was part of Admiral Calder's fleet at the Battle of Cape Finisterre.

21 July 1802 she was at Gibraltar to prevent Algerian corsairs from passing through the Straits.

In 1810 Triumph and Phipps, salvaged a large load of elemental mercury from a wrecked Spanish vessel near Cadiz, Spain. The bladders containing the mercury soon ruptured, poisoning the crew with mercury vapour.

Triumph was on harbour service from 1813 but was not broken up until 1850.
