= HMS Musquito (1798) =

Sloop of the Royal Navy

- The front page of HMS Musquito's logbook, held at The National Archives, Kew

History

France
- Name: Petite Magicienne
- Captured: 1798

Great Britain
- Name: HMS Musquito
- Acquired: By capture 1798
- Fate: Captured by three Spanish frigates

Spain
- Name: Mosquito (alias Ardilla)
- Acquired: By capture 1798
- Fate: Broken up 1805

General characteristics
- Type: ship-sloop
- Tons burthen: 178 (bm)
- Length: 23,1 m.
- Beam: 6,1m.
- Complement: 87 men
- Armament: 16 × 4-pounder guns
- Notes: In modern-day English sources, the ship is often mistaken for HMS Musquito, paid off in 1796.

HMS Musquito (or Mosquito) was a 16-gun ship-sloop, previously the French privateer Magicienne or Petite Magicienne. The Royal Navy captured her in March 1798. After the Spanish captured Musquito in September 1798, she served in the Spanish Navy until she was broken up in 1805.

== Capture ==
Detail of Musquito's Muster Roll, held at The National Archives. Classified as a sixth-rate sloop, Lieutenant John Whyte commanding.

On 1 March 1798, HMS Valiant, one of the ships that belonged to the squadron of viceadmiral Sir Hyde Parker, captured a French privateer off the coast of Santo Domingo. one of the ships that belonged to the squadron of vice admiral Sir Hyde Parker. Petite Magicienne, the captured privateer, had a crew of 87 men, some of them mutineers from the frigate HMS Hermione, and mounted sixteen 4-pounder guns. Captain Crawley of Valiant gave his report to Parker on 8 March 1798 at Cape Nichola Mole. He wrote to Parker, ...after ... five hours I came up with & captured La Magicienne, French corsair of sixteen guns and eighty-eight men, and it being hinted to me that James Mason, late Carpenter's Mate of His Majesty's ship Hermione... Her captors carried Petite Magicienne into the Mole of St Nicholas on 8 March. There Parker gathered his ships and ordered, few days later, the incorporation of Magicienne into the Royal Navy under the name Musquito.

== Career and fate ==
Musquito was commissioned in June 1798 under Lieutenant John Whyte. Parker assigned her a crew of 87 men with the same sixteen 4 pounders that she carried at the time of her capture. Lieutenant Whyte wrote that, despite her small dimensions, she was a sixth-rate sloop-of-war. On 29 July she had an incident at Dewee's Inlet, South Carolina with the American brig Unanimity (14). The ships exchanged broadsides and then Unanimity was driven ashore. Unanimity is described as a revenue cutter belonging to the State of South Carolina, instead of the U.S.R.C Service.

On 16 September 1798 Musquito was escorting a small convoy off the north coast of Cuba when at daybreak she sighted some strange vessels. When it became apparent that the vessels were frigates and that they were not answering private signals, Musquito signaled to her charges that they should flee. She herself made for Puerto Padre, with the frigates in pursuit. She crossed the bar and anchored just inside. However, when the pursuers crossed the bar and anchored some 300 to 400 yards away, she surrendered. Her captors were the Spanish frigates Medea (40 guns), Esmeralda (38 guns, flagship), and Santa Clara (38 guns), a squadron commanded by Capitán de Fragata Don Rafael Butrón de Mújica. Although Musquito had a complement of 87 men, at the time of her capture she carried only 64 on board, as Whyte had detached some of its men to secure prizes taken to the enemy, including a Spanish merchant sloop. The day before, the master of this Spanish merchant sloop had advised Whyte to set his course towards Puerto Padre, to avoid the squadron.

== Spanish service ==
In October 1798 she was placed under Teniente de Fragata Benito Prieto as the 16-gun corvette Mosquito (alias) Ardilla. She outsailed the British blockade of Havana and entered Veracruz shortly after. In late 1804 a British frigate captured Ardilla, but as war had not been declared she was returned to the Spanish Navy. Ardilla was finally broken up in 1805.
