= Super Gran =

British children's television series (1985–1987)

- Gudrun Ure as Super Gran
- Created by: Forrest Wilson
- Written by: Jenny McDade
- Starring: Gudrun Ure; Iain Cuthbertson; Bill Shine; Alan Snell; Brian Lewis
- Narrated by: Bill McAllister ("The Reporter")
- Theme music composer: Anthony Isaac
- Country of origin: United Kingdom
- Original language: English
- No. of series: 2
- No. of episodes: 27

Production
- Producers: Keith Richardson (1985); Graham Williams (1986–1987)
- Cinematography: Graham Brown
- Editor: Mike Pounder
- Running time: 25 minutes
- Production company: Tyne Tees Television

Original release
- Network: ITV (CITV)
- Release: 20 January 1985 – 31 May 1987

Super Gran is a series about a fictional grandmother with superpowers. Initially a series of books written by Forrest Wilson, a children's television show was adapted by Jenny McDade and produced by Tyne Tees Television for Children's ITV. The title character was played by Gudrun Ure, with Iain Cuthbertson as her nemesis, Roderick, the Scunner Campbell. It originally ran from 1985 to 1987.

Two series, each consisting of thirteen episodes, were produced, alongside a Christmas special. All episodes have been released on DVD by Network. The show inspired two computer games.

== Premise ==
An elderly grandmother, Granny Smith (Gudrun Ure), acquires superpowers when she is accidentally hit by a magic ray created by Inventor Black (Bill Shine). In the guise of "Super Gran", she protects the residents of the fictional town of Chisleton from villains such as James Jennings, Eastie and Roderick Lithgoe "Scunner" Campbell (Iain Cuthbertson) and his gang, The Muscles (Alan Snell and Brian Lewis) and Tub (Lee Marshall, Jason Carrielies (Note: Series 1 and 2 respectively.)). Super Gran was usually accompanied by her grandson Willard (Iam Towell, Michael Graham) and Inventor Black's niece and assistant Edison Faraday Black (Holly English, Samantha Duffy).

Episodes were narrated by Bill McAllister.

== Production ==
=== Inception ===
Super Gran was created by author Forrest Wilson. He says that the character was a combination of three characters: Pansy Potter from The Beano, his own mother-in-law, and an unnamed Scottish actress who looked and sounded like he imagined the character should. The first book was published in 1978, followed by several others, many illustrated by David McKee. Following the television series' success, Wilson adapted McDade's scripts as: Television Adventures of Super Gran, More Television Adventures of Super Gran, and Super Gran to the Rescue. Wilson, with Graham Kennedy, also released Super Gran: The Picture Book.

Gudrun Ure read Super Gran: Complete & Unabridged for an audiobook release in 1991. Tyne Tees published an annual in 1985.

There were some significant differences between the books and the TV series. The most notable was the character of Inventor Black. Although he was an ally of Super Gran in the TV series, he was the antagonist in Wilson's original prose.

=== Filming ===
The show was filmed in various locations around North East England, including Tynemouth, Whitley Bay, South Shields and Beamish Museum. Inventor Black's laboratory was housed in an empty church on Tynemouth Front Street, which became Land of the Green Ginger. Sets were housed in an old warehouse in North Shields; its corrugated roof caused sound difficulties when it rained. A stone cottage in Church Way, Earsdon, near Whitley Bay, was used as Super Gran's home. A huge crane used to hoist Super Gran into her flying position was parked in the neighbouring school.

Gudrun Ure, who was 58 when she first appeared in the show, had only one stunt double and did a lot of stunts herself. Tyne Tees executive Andrea Wonfor said that they 'used to do all the special effects with trampolines and things.' Filming the Christmas special and the second series took about nine months of 10-hour days (one hour for lunch), beginning in April 1986. Sue Sweeney, who appeared in many episodes, recalls that she "did everything from sunbathing on the beach at Cullercoats in the rain to a Gorilla at the fancy dress party."

The young actors were all local children from the Newcastle area, and the Scunner's two toughies (Alan Snell and Brian Lewis) were local stand-up comics who performed in clubs at night. Many guest stars appeared on the programme, including George Best, Spike Milligan, Eric Bristow, Roy Kinnear and Geoff Capes. It was Patrick Troughton and Charles Hawtrey's final screen appearances.

Following production, memorabilia from the show was displayed at The Land of Green Ginger shopping centre in Tynemouth. After owner Gordon Reed put the props up for sale after deciding to revamp the mall, local electrician Mark Simms bought Super Gran's flying bike and magic ray machine for £403.

The theme song was performed by Billy Connolly. The full version was released as a single in March 1985 and reached number 32 in the UK singles chart. The tune was written by Anthony Isaac; this would turn out to be the last of his numerous scores for film and TV.

== Episodes ==
The transmission of the first episode in 1985 was preceded by a "making-of" documentary.

=== Series one ===
Episode title	Original airdate	Directed by	#
"Super Gran and the Magic Ray"	3 January 1985 (CBC); 20 January 1985 (ITV)	Anthony Simmons	1
While watching her grandson play football, Granny Smith (Gudrun Ure) is hit by a ray created by Inventor Black (Bill Shine), giving her magical powers.
"Super Gran and the Skimmer"	27 January 1985	Gerry Mill	2
"Super Gran and the Course of True Love"	3 February 1985	Tony Kysh	3
Eccentric Scottish millionaire Angus McSporran (Billy Connolly) comes to Chisleton to ask Super Gran for her hand in marriage. Simultaneously, the Scunner Campbell has asked for the hand of the Black Pudding Heiress Lady Valerie Glutt (Patsy Rowlands). Super Gran does not like the thought of either of these romantic pairings.
"Super Gran and the Pearl of Pinnell's End"	10 February 1985	Anthony Simmons	4
"Super Gran and the Super Match"	17 February 1985	Tony Kysh	5
The aging local football team, managed by Roy Kinnear, is drawn against the top side The Mighty Rovers with star striker Gary Bootle (Jon Iles) in the cup. Worse still, somebody has drugged the half-time drinks and the substitute (George Best) has seen better days. Only Super Gran and the local kids can save the day.
"Super Gran Grounded"	24 February 1985	Tony Kysh	6
Geoff Capes injures Super Gran during an event at a stadium. Meanwhile, the Scunner Campbell plans to kidnap the Honourable Bertrand Battenburg (Andrew Forbes) but is beaten to it by Mad Mick Merseyside Nick Stringer.
"Super Gran and the Magic Ian"	3 March 1985	Gerry Mill	7
Guest starring Irene Handl as Clinging Ivey, The Great Renaldo's mother
"Super Gran and the TV Villains"	10 March 1985	Gerry Mill	8
Guest stars Burt Kwouk, Mo Moreland (The Mighty Atom)
"Super Gran and the Doppelganger"	17 March 1985	Tony Kysh	9
A lookalike of Supergran, Greta Gorboils (also played by Gudrun Ure), is committing a crime wave round Chisleton.
"Super Gran and the Day at the Sea"	24 March 1985	Tony Kysh	10
"Super Gran and the Raid on Race Day"	31 March 1985	Anthony Simmons	11
Chisleton has got marathon fever. Even the Scunner and his cronies are practising, but only so they can rob the Chisleton bank on race day. Guest starring Pat Coombs, with John Conteh as himself.
"Super Gran and the Raving Beauty Contest"	7 April 1985	Roger Cheveley	12
When Super Gran organises a Chisleton beauty contest with her niece Isla St. Porridge (Lulu) entering, the Scunner is tasked by the head of the Gangster Guild to make sure her daughter Wanda ends up the winner.
"Super Gran and the Missing Hissing"	14 April 1985	Roger Cheveley	13
The Scunner Campbell is chasing a winning lottery ticket lost in a gust of wind. Guest starring Spike Milligan

=== Christmas special ===
Episode title	Original airdate	Directed by	#
"Christmas Super Gran: The World's Worst Circus"	24 December 1986	Gerald Blake	1
Guest starring Paul Shane, Rikki Fulton and Anna Dawson, with Eli Woods.

=== Series 2 ===
Episode title	Original airdate	Directed by	#
"Super Gran and the Racing Cert"	8 March 1987	Tony Kysh	1
Rock star Newcastle Brown (Gary Glitter) arrives to enter his pigeon in a race.
"Super Gran and the Treasure Trovers"	15 March 1987	Roger Cheveley	2
"Super Gran and the Birthday Dambusters"	22 March 1987	Tony Kysh	3
Scunner Campbell, the Muscles and Tubbs enlist in the RAF. Super Gran is surprised to discover that she misses them.
"Super Gran and the Yankee Doodle's Boodle"	29 March 1987	Gerald Blake	4
Chistleton celebrates American Week.
"Super Gran and the Rookie Recruit"	5 April 1987	Tony Kysh	5
The Chistleton Games are about to take place and the Scunner is trying his luck as an accountant. Only clumsy P.C. Derek Dumpling (Melvyn Hayes) can stop him on his first day in the job.
"Super Gran and the State Visit"	12 April 1987	Gerald Blake	6
Guest starring Charles Hawtrey
"Chisleton Street Blues"	19 April 1987	Tony Kysh	7
"Super Gran and the School for Scoundrels"	26 April 1987	Tony Kysh	8
"Super Gran and the Media Star"	3 May 1987	Roger Cheveley	9
"Super Gran Snookered"	10 May 1987	Roger Cheveley	10
"Super Gran and the Fancy Dress Fanciers"	17 May 1987	Tony Kysh	11
"Super Gran and the Chronic Crooner"	24 May 1987	Tim Dowd	12
"Super Gran and the Heir Apparent"	31 May 1987	Tony Kysh	13
Guest starring Patrick Troughton (in his final acting role) and Barbara Windsor

== Reception and legacy ==
Super Gran won an Emmy, and sold to more than 60 countries worldwide. According to director Tony Kysh, "Tyne Tees was one of the first Western companies to sell to China TV where Super Gran was a big success." The show became a ratings hit in Cuba in the early 2000s, where the show was redubbed into Spanish.

The character of Super Gran came seventh in The Glasgow Herald's 2003 poll "The Most Scottish Person In The World". The University of Nottingham cited Super Gran as an example of perceptions of grandmothers "being reshaped by socio-cultural messages as well as personal experience".

Two videos were released, each containing three episodes. The first series was released by Network in a 2-DVD set on 10 August 2009, and the second series on 16 May 2011. The Whitley Bay Playhouse scheduled a Super Gran evening in February 2012, featuring classic episodes, a making-of documentary, photographs and props.

== Special effects ==
An obituary of Ure in the Guardian outlined the television series' "very basic special effects".

"Ure was seen jumping high or pole-vaulting through windows (using a trampoline and trick camera angles), flying (with the help of a crane) and riding through the air on a two-wheel, multiwinged Flycycle (in reality an adapted butcher’s boy’s bike). Ure did many of the stunts herself, while some – including Super Gran cartwheeling – were performed by a double."

== Computer games ==
Tynesoft produced two games based on the show in 1985.

The game Super Gran was an action game involving Super Gran's anti-gravity belt. It was released for the Amstrad CPC, Commodore 16, Commodore 64 and ZX Spectrum.

Super Gran – The Adventure was a text adventure based on the show, written by Adventure Soft's Brian Howarth. The premise is that Super Gran has to save people whilst looking out for Scunner Campbell. This game was released on the Acorn Electron, BBC Micro, C16, C64 and Spectrum.
