= OTELO =

OTELO (OSIRIS Tunable Emission Line Object survey) is an emission line object survey using OSIRIS tunable filters in selected atmospheric windows relatively free of sky emission lines.

== Overview ==
The total survey sky area is of 1 square degree (0.30 msr) distributed in different high latitude and low extinction fields with enough angular separations. A 5 sigma depth of 8×10^{−18} (erg/cm^{2})/s (8 zW/m^{2} or 9×10^{−24} hp/yd^{2}) allows detecting objects of equivalent widths down to 6. OTELO will observe objects with an age equivalent to 10% of the age of the Universe. Given the observing procedure, OTELO will allow studying a clearly defined volume of the Universe at a known flux limit. OTELO will complement spectroscopic surveys, since the selection criteria are completely different: not broad band based but emission line based, which will allow detecting faint continuum objects.

The scientific field that OTELO will allow tackling is very wide, and encompasses evolutionary studies of Ly alpha emitters, QSO, AGN, star-forming populations (specifically the faint end luminosity), Emissión line ellipticals (detectable depending upon its evolution), chemical evolution of the Universe between z=0.24 and z=1.5, mass/luminosity relation vs. morphological type and redshift (up to z=1.5), Tully-Fisher relation up to z=1.5 and derivation of cosmological parameters. Other studies include galactic structure and Galactic objects (PN, peculiar stars, cataclysmic variables).
