= Hercules-class ship of the line =

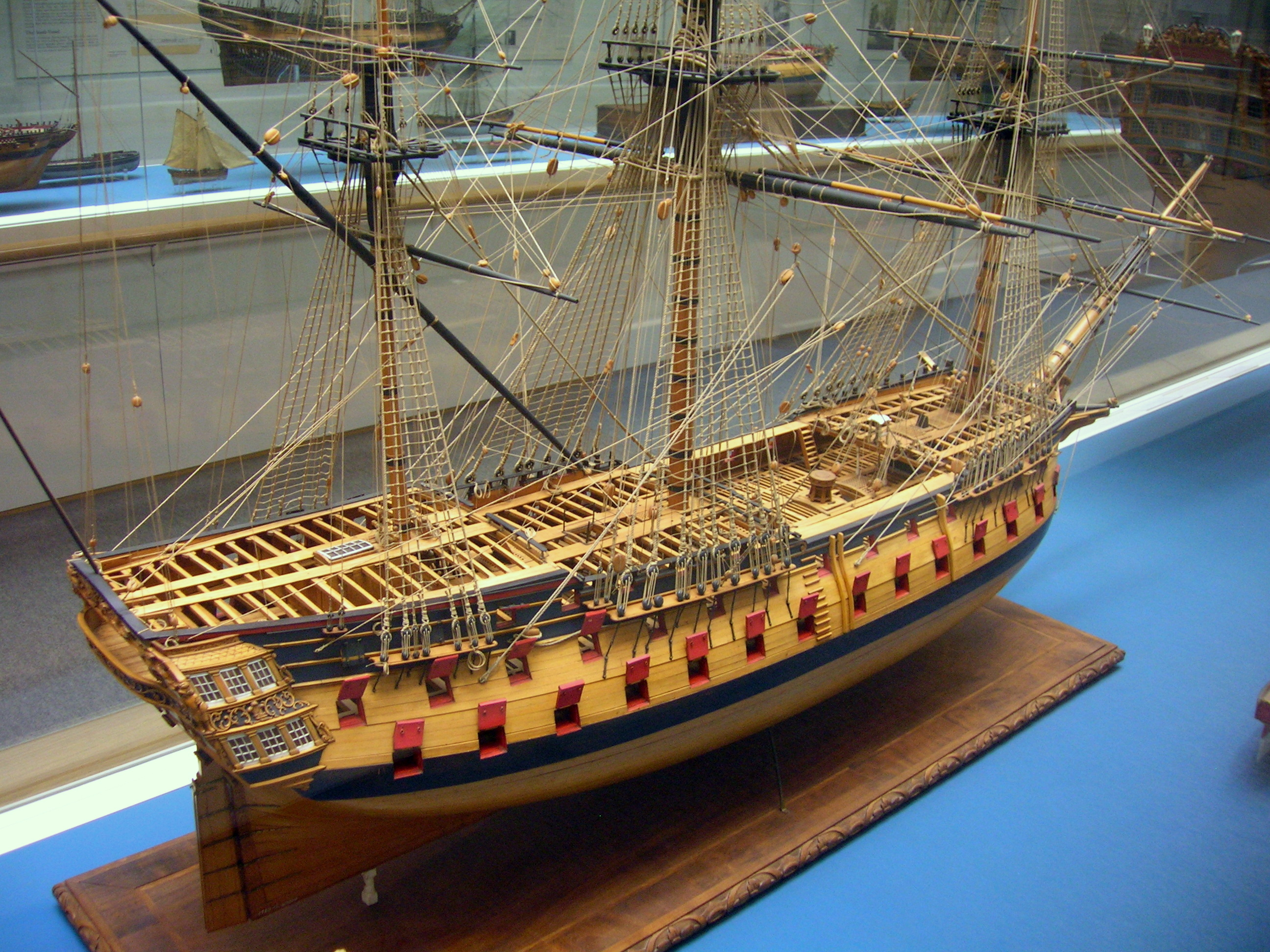
- Model of a 74-gun ship, 3rd rate, circa 1760. Thought to be either HMS Hercules or HMS Thunderer from 1760.

Class overview
- Name: Hercules
- Operators: Royal Navy
- Preceded by: Dublin class
- Succeeded by: Valiant class
- In service: 15 March 1759 - 1784
- Completed: 2
- Lost: 1

General characteristics
- Type: Ship of the line
- Length: 166 ft 6 in (50.75 m) (gundeck); 136 ft 0 in (41.45 m) (keel)
- Beam: 46 ft 6 in (14.17 m)
- Propulsion: Sails
- Armament: 74 guns: Gundeck: 28 × 32-pounders; Upper gundeck: 28 × 18-pounders; Quarterdeck: 14 × 9-pounders; Forecastle: 4 × 9-pounders
- Notes: Ships in class include: Hercules, Thunderer

The Hercules class ships of the line were a class of two 74-gun third rates, designed for the Royal Navy by Sir Thomas Slade.

== Design ==
The Hercules-class ships were a development on Slade's previous two designs: the Dublin-class, and the subsequent one-off HMS Hero.

== Ships ==
- HMS Hercules

Builder: Deptford Dockyard
Ordered: 15 July 1756
Launched: 15 March 1759
Fate: Sold out of the service, 1784

- HMS Thunderer

Builder: Woolwich Dockyard
Ordered: 15 July 1756
Launched: 19 March 1760
Fate: Wrecked, 1780
