= HMS Valiant (1759) =

Ship of the line of the Royal Navy

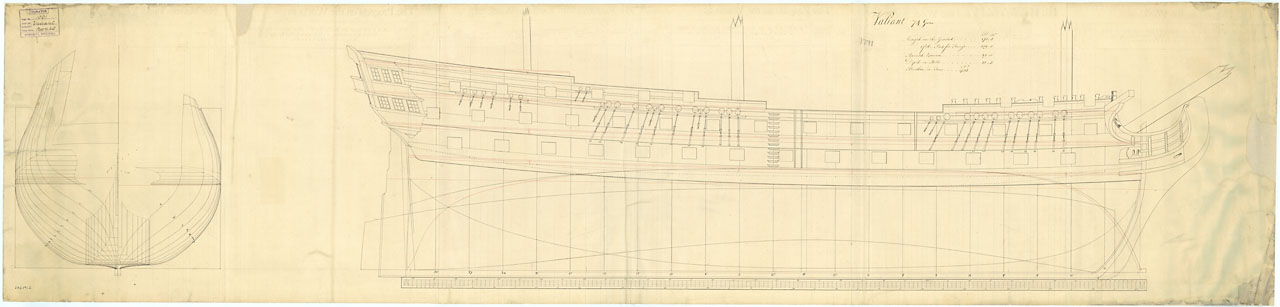
- Valiant

History

Great Britain
- Name: HMS Valiant
- Ordered: 21 May 1757
- Builder: Chatham Dockyard
- Launched: 10 August 1759
- Fate: Broken up, 1826
- Notes: Harbour service from 1799

General characteristics
- Class & type: Valiant-class ship of the line
- Tons burthen: 1799 (bm)
- Beam: 49 ft 8 in (15.14 m)
- Depth of hold: 22 ft 5 in (6.83 m)
- Propulsion: Sails
- Sail plan: Full-rigged ship
- Armament: Gundeck: 28 × 32-pounder guns; Upper gundeck: 30 × 24-pounder guns; QD: 10 × 9-pounder guns; Fc: 2 × 9-pounder guns

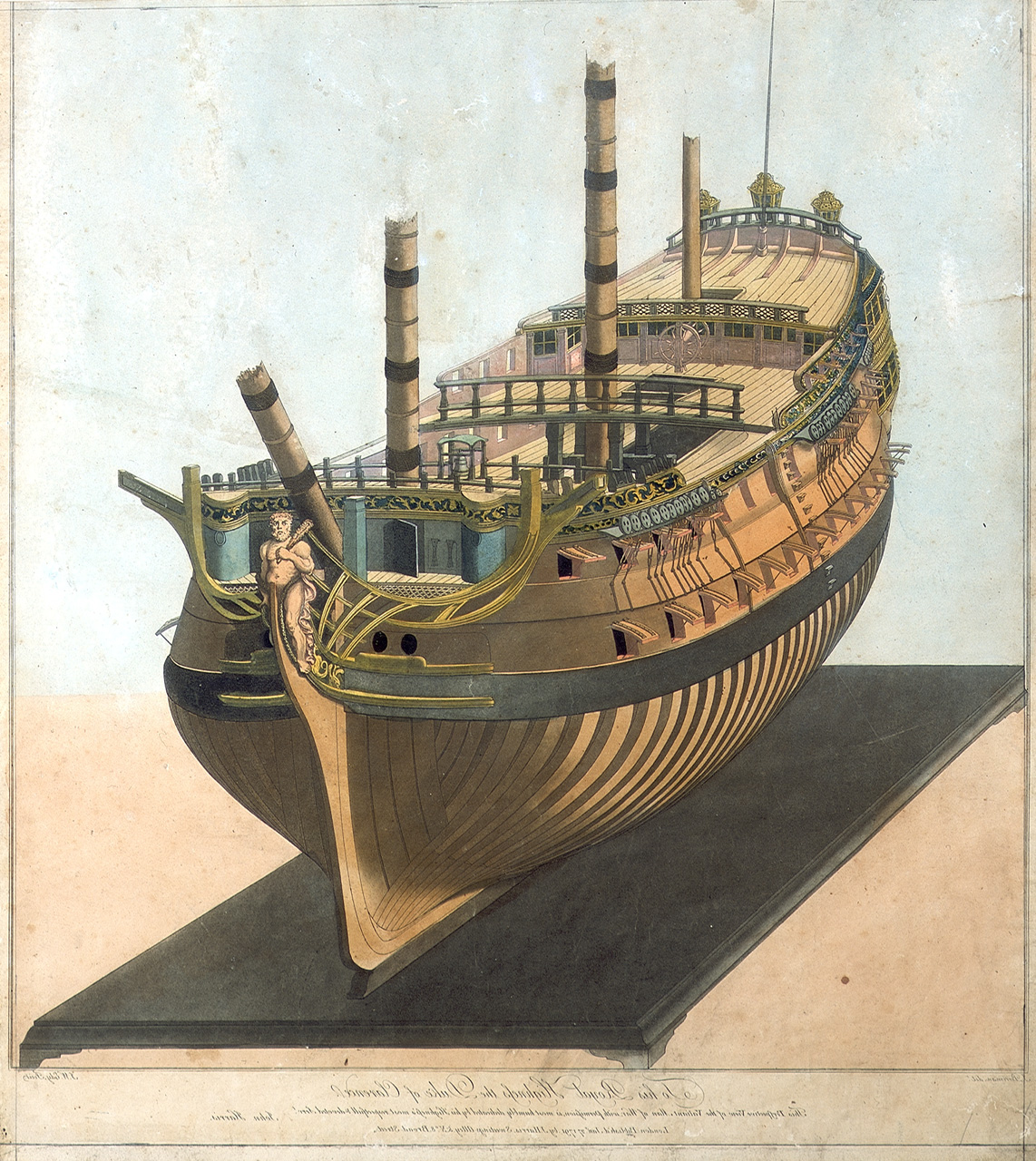
Perspective (bow) View of the Valiant Man of War (ship model)

HMS Valiant was a 70-gun third rate ship of the line of the Royal Navy, modelled on the captured French ship Invincible and launched on 1 August 1759 at Chatham Dockyard. Her construction, launch and fitting-out are the theme of the 'Wooden Walls' visitor experience at Chatham Historic Dockyard. She served under Augustus Keppel during the Seven Years' War, and was with him at the Capture of Havana, in 1763.

She took part in the action of 4 January 1781.

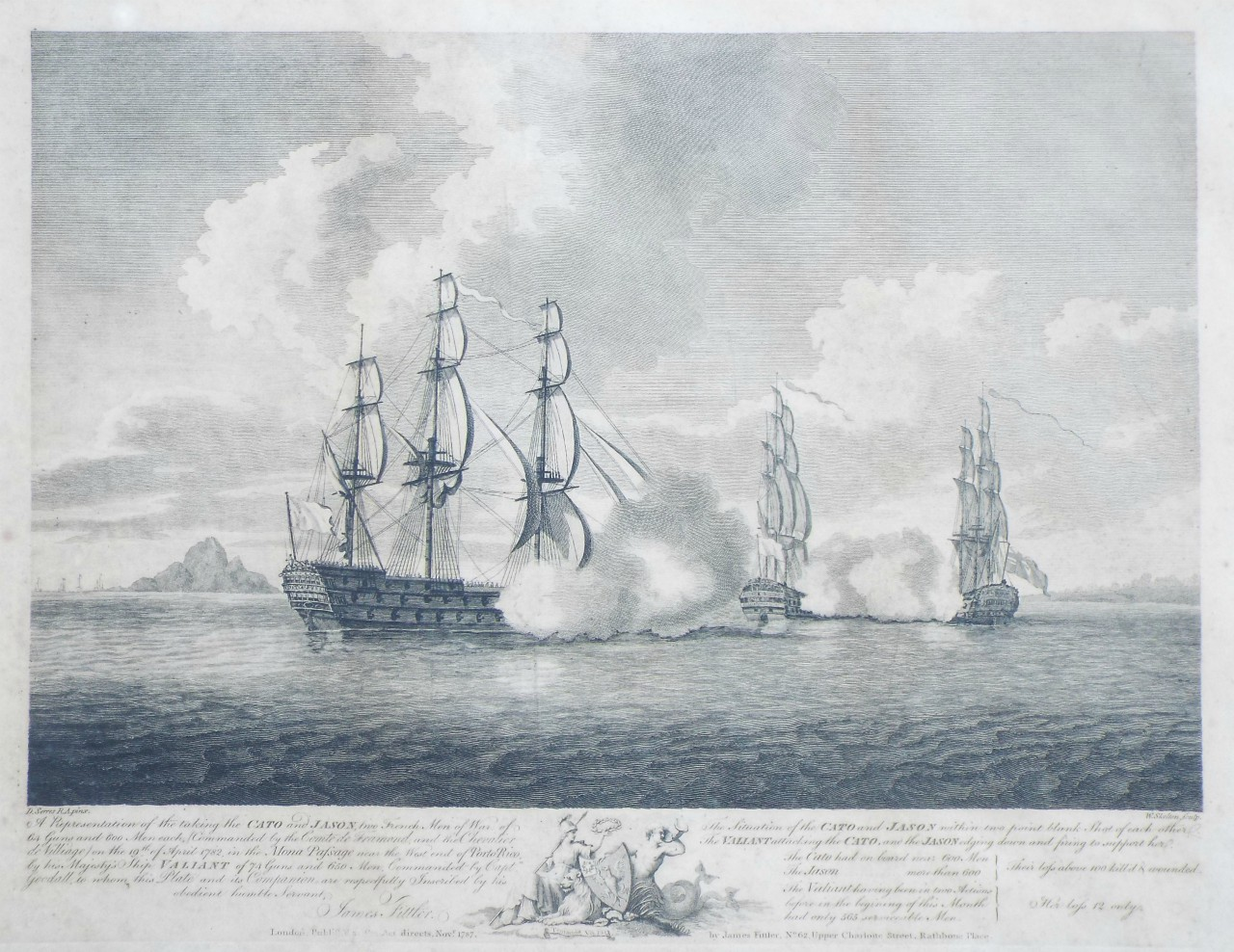
Valiant taking the French Cato and Jason on 19 April 1782, in the Mona Passage, near the west end of Porto Rico

In 1782 she was under George Rodney at the Battle of the Saintes.

Valiant also served under Admiral Prince William in 1789 and fought at the Glorious First of June in 1794. In 1798 she captured the French privateer corvette Magicienne. In 1799 she was placed on harbour service, and was eventually broken up in 1827.
