= Banastre (1787 ship) =

British enslaving ship 1787–1793

History

Great Britain
- Name: Banastre
- Owner: 1786: Clayton Tarleton, Daniel Backhouse, John Tarleton, and Thomas Tarleton; 1792: Daniel Backhouse, John Tarleton, and Thomas Tarleton
- Builder: Ringsend, port of Dublin
- Launched: 1759
- Captured: 1793

General characteristics
- Tons burthen: Originally:80, or 93(bm); After lengthening in 1789: 148 (bm)
- Length: 64 ft 8 in (19.7 m) (before lengthening in 1789)
- Beam: 18 ft 6 in (5.6 m) (above the wales)
- Depth of hold: 4 ft 9 in (1.4 m)
- Sail plan: Possibly schooner at one point, then ship rig
- Notes: Two decks and three masts

Banastre (occasionally misspelled Banister), was built at Ringsend, Dublin, in 1759, though under what name is unclear. By 1787 she was in the hands of the Tarletons and Daniel Backhouse of Liverpool. She made five complete voyages as a Liverpool-based slave ship in the triangular trade, transporting enslaved people from West Africa to the Caribbean. On her first voyage an incident in which one enslaver fired on her led to a landmark court case. A French warship captured her in 1793 as she was on her way from West Africa to Jamaica on her sixth voyage transporting captives.

== Career ==
Banastre underwent a thorough repair in 1784. After Parliament passed the Registry Act (1786), the Tarletons and Backhouse registered her at Liverpool (Reg. №87 of 1787). (Note: Between 1786 and 1804, John Tarleton and Daniel Backhouse owned 39 vessels, half of which were engaged in the slave trade.) She entered Lloyd's Register in 1787 with J. Kenedy, master, Tarleton & Co., owners, and trade Liverpool-Africa. Between 1787 and 1792, Banastre made five voyages transporting captives from West Africa to the West Indies.

1st enslaving voyage (1787–1788): On 31 March 1787 Captain Henry Kennedy sailed from Liverpool, bound for Calabar, where she would acquire captives. At some point on the voyage out Thomas Smith replaced Henry Kennedy.

Smith was master when Banastre arrived at the Bight of Benin and Gulf of Guinea Islands. When she arrived at Calabar, Captain Patrick Fairweather, of Tarleton, another vessel under the ownership of the Tarleton-Backhouse partnership, and a senior captain for them, sent Banastre to the coast of Cameroon. When she arrived there some natives in a canoe approached to trade with her, but were warned off by a shot from another enslaving vessel, Othello, (Note: Othello was a ship of 122 tons (bm), launched at Liverpool in 1786.) that killed one of the natives. Captain James McGauley, of Othello, had ordered the shot fired because the natives on that coast owed him a debt and he had declared that he would permit no trade until they had paid him. In 1793 the case of Tarleton and others vs. McGauley came to trial with the plaintiffs suing McGauley for loss of trade. (Note: In the description of the case, Banastre is rendered as Banister.) The court found for the plaintiffs, establishing that it is a tort "to cause damage to a person by maliciously using any unlawful means, (e.g. fraud, or threats of assault), to induce anyone to abstain from entering into a contract with him."

Smith sailed Banastre on to Grenada, arriving on 22 October 1787. She had embarked 210 captives and she landed 187, for a mortality rate of 11%. There Thomas Smith registered the change of master. Banastre sailed from Grenada on 9 November 1787 and arrived back at Liverpool on 3 January 1788. She had left with 22 crew members and had suffered one crew death on the voyage.

2nd enslaving voyage (1788–1789): On 26 May 1788 Samuel Bowskill replaced Smith as commander of Banastre. He sailed from Liverpool on 11 June, bound for the Gold Coast. Banastre started acquiring captives at Cape Coast Castle on 4 August, and sailed for the West Indies on 10 September. She arrived at Grenada in November, and was back at Liverpool on 2 February 1789. She had left with 24 crew members and she suffered one crew death on the voyage.

3rd enslaving voyage (1789–1790): Captain Bowskill sailed from Liverpool on 22 May 1789, this time to the Bight of Biafra and Gulf of Guinea islands. Banastre acquired captives at Calabar and New Calabar. Bowskill died on 12 November. Captain John K. Williams replaced Bowskill as master. She arrived at Kingston, Jamaica, on 19 December and landed 164 captives there. Banastre sailed from Kingston on 15 February 1790 and arrived at Liverpool on 25 April. She had left Liverpool with 25 crew members and she suffered four crew deaths on the voyage.

4th enslaving voyage (1790–1791): In 1790 her master was "C. Bowskill", changing to J. Rigmaiden. Captain Rigmaiden sailed from Liverpool on 16 October 1810, bound for the Bight of Biafra and Gulf of Guinea islands. She acquired captives at New Calabar and carried them to Dominica. On 24 June 1791 Banastre arrived in Dominica from New Calabar with 170 captives: 79 men, 55 women, 23 girls, and 13 boys. (Note: If one takes the 170 as the number of captives landed, and estimate that she loaded 210, the mortality rate was in excess of 15%.) Banastre sailed from Dominica on 8 July, and arrived back at Liverpool on 15 August. She had left Liverpool with 21 crew members and she suffered three deaths on the voyage.

5th enslaving voyage (1791–1792): Captain James Harrocks replaced Rigmaiden. He sailed from Liverpool on 18 November 1791, and started acquiring captives at Bonny Island 21 January 1792. Banstre left Africa on 30 April and arrived at Dominica on 12 June where she landed 239 captives. She had embarked 295, but 53 had died before she even left the African coast. (Note: The mortality rate was about 19%.) A further three had died on the Middle Passage. She sailed from Dominica on 2 July and arrived back at Liverpool on 1 August. She had left with 22 crew members and she suffered two deaths on the voyage.

== Loss ==
In 1793 Banastre's master was J. Davies, who replaced Harrocks. Captain Davies sailed from Liverpool on 24 November 1792, on Banastre's 6th enslaving voyage. In 1793, 68 British vessels sailed on enslaving voyages.

Lloyd's List reported on 6 August 1793 that a French frigate of 44 guns had captured Banastre as she was sailing from London to Jamaica, and had taken her into Santo Domingo.

In 1793, 17 British enslaving vessels were lost, nine of them in the Middle Passage, while sailing between Africa and the West Indies. During the period 1793 to 1807, war, rather than maritime hazards or resistance by the captives, was the greatest cause of vessel losses among British enslaving vessels.

In 1793, the slave trade did particularly well as Jamaica alone imported 23,000 captives that year. The total for 1791 to 1795 was just under 80,000 captives imported, though perhaps some 15,000 were transshipped to Cuba.
