= Othello (Orson Welles stage production) =

1951 stage production

- Written by: William Shakespeare

Premiere
- Date premiered: October 1, 1951 (this production)
- Place premiered: Theatre Royal, Newcastle

Othello was a 1951 production of William Shakespeare's play of the same name, which was produced, directed by and starring Orson Welles in his first appearance on the London stage.

== Production ==
In 1948, Orson Welles began work on a self-financed film of Othello, which was not completed until 1952. Filming was sporadic, and he frequently stopped the production to take on other acting jobs (including The Third Man) to raise more funds. In 1951, Welles had completed principal photography, but was still trying to raise money to finish editing the film. He was thus delighted to receive an offer from Laurence Olivier, then operating the St James's Theatre, to come and perform Othello on the London stage.

Olivier's offer was not met with universal approval. John Gielgud famously asked Welles "You're going to do Othello? [pause] On the stage? [longer pause] In London? [total speechlessness]"

Of the play's design, theatre critic Kenneth Tynan offered the following description:

"Welles the producer gave us a new vista (based on five permanent golden pillars) for every scene; he used a russet traverse-curtain to wipe away the setting in the same manner that the film would use a dissolve; he sprinkled the action with some striking background music and realistic recording - in fact, he sacrificed much to give us a credible reading of a play which bristles with illogicalities. The presentation was visually flawless...the St James's stage seemed as big as a field."

Composer Angelo Francesco Lavagnino, had already composed the score for Welles's Othello film, and the director recalled Lavagnino also "wrote an entirely different score for Othello when I did it in the theatre."

Of Welles's preparations for the play, his biographer Frank Brady writes:

"Stories about Orson's rehearsals quickly became London legends: wielding an enormous long stick from his seat in the front rows to direct and guide his actors where he wanted them to move; disappearing for days before opening night; forgetting his own lines; changing his own entrances from stage left, then stage right, from the back curtains, down stairways, without telling his cast in advance where he would appear, so as to keep them alert; having an enormous picnic hamper prepared at...The Ivy delivered to the theater each day packed with his individual lunch, which consisted of large sherried oysters, pâté de foie gras, a wheel of Runesten cheese, and other delicacies and always accompanied by a bucket of chilled Pouilly-Fumé or a Musigny Blanc."

The play experienced some problems. On the opening night, Welles mistook his cue, and accidentally walked on to the stage much too early, just after curtain up. Realising his mistake, he froze in front of the audience, exclaimed "Fuck!", and exited while audience members asked "Did he just say what I thought he said?" In another performance, Welles so vigorously banged Gudrun Ure's head against a wall during the murder scene that members of the audience protested, and Welles had to apologise after the show, citing having got carried away.

Welles found he was hoarse in rehearsals, but regained his voice in time for opening night. The play initially opened for a one-week preview run at the Theatre Royal, Newcastle from 1 to the 7 October 1951, then toured in several regional theatres before opening a six-week run in London on 18 October 1951.

One night, Winston Churchill came to watch the play and sat in the front row. As was often his habit when watching Shakespeare plays, Churchill mumbled along much of the dialogue from memory, including retaining all the cut lines, with added emphasis - which the cast found highly distracting.

Welles and Olivier would collaborate on the London stage again, with less happy results, in a 1960 production of Rhinoceros.

== Cast ==
- Othello . . . Orson Welles
- Desdemona . . . Gudrun Ure
- Iago . . . Peter Finch
- Roderigo . . . Basil Lord
- Cassio . . . John Van Eyssen
- Others, including Edmund Purdom

== Reception ==
Most reviews were positive. John Griffin, London correspondent of the Herald Tribune, wrote that it was a "star vehicle for a star actor." Cecil Wilson praised the performances of Peter Finch and Gudrun Ure. T.C. Worsley of the New Statesman praised the play's tension, although was more ambiguous about Welles's performance. Welles stated of his own performance, "I was much better in the theatre, which I did after [filming] the movie."

Not all reviews were positive - Kenneth Tynan gave a scathing review of Welles's performance, writing "There's no doubt about it, Orson Welles has the courage of his restrictions", describing his acting as "a huge shrug...Welles's Othello is the lordly and mannered performance we saw in Citizen Kane, slightly adapted to read 'Citizen Coon'."

Welles sought to make light of some of the more negative reviews. One night, he followed a performance with a midnight magic act at the Coliseum Theatre before an audience including Queen Elizabeth II and the Duke of Edinburgh, where he introduced himself: "I have just come from the St James's Theatre, where I have been murdering Desdemona - or Shakespeare, according to which newspaper you read."
