= Mima Simić =

Croatian writer, critic and activist (born 1976)

Mima Simić (born Ana Marija Simić; 4 February 1976) is a Croatian writer, film critic, translator and an LGBT media activist. She holds degrees in Comparative Literature and English Language and Literature from the Faculty of Humanities and Social Sciences, University of Zagreb and Gender Studies from the Central European University.

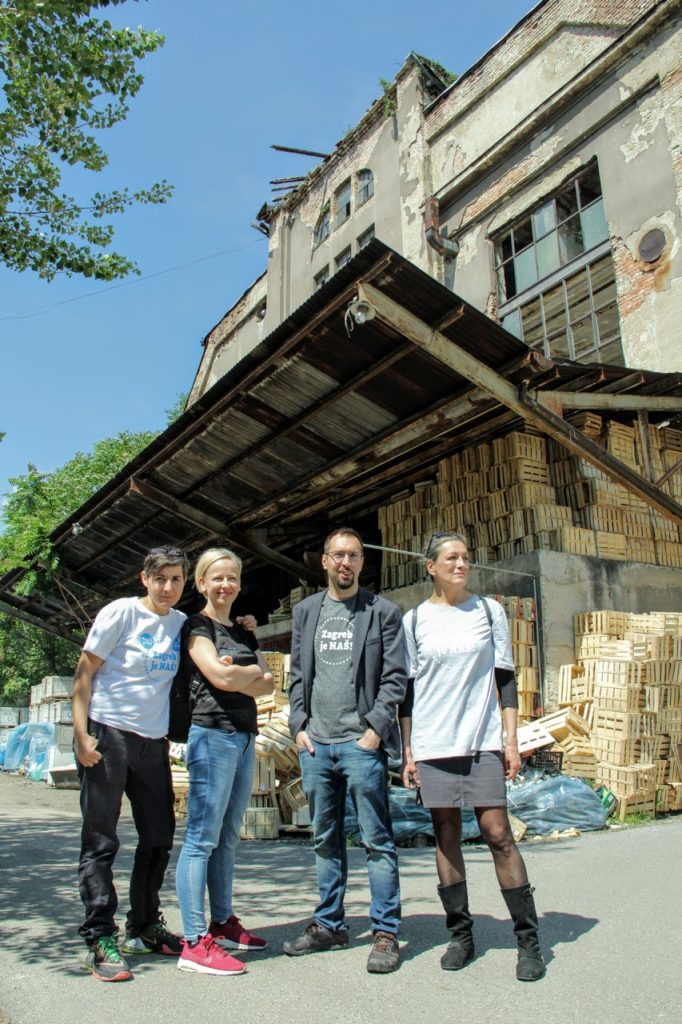
Simić (on far left) with other members of Zagreb je Nas!, 2017

== Career ==
Simić wrote for the Feral Tribune in the 2000s.

She is the author of a short story collection Pustolovine Glorije Scott (The Adventures of Gloria Scott, AGM, 2005), which is currently being made into an animated series and a collection of film essays Otporna na Hollywood (HFS, 2009). Her short stories and various other texts have been published in numerous Croatian and international magazines, journals and anthologies.

== Activism and media work ==
Simić is particularly interested in activist interventions in the media. In 2007, Simić went on Tko želi biti milijunaš?, the Croatian version of the Who Wants to Be a Millionaire? and outed herself as a lesbian. She ended up winning 125,000 HRK. For her activist engagement in 2011, she was named the Croatian LGBT person of the decade by the Zagreb Pride Committee. During the debate on 2013 Croatian constitutional referendum, Simić was the guest on Nedjeljom u dva, becoming the first out lesbian to appear in the long history of this most popular Croatian political TV show.

Simić received a literary grant from the Croatian Ministry of Culture in 2012.

From 2013 to 2015, Simić hosted the weekly TV show Peti dan (Fifth Day) on Croatian Radiotelevision.

During the leftist-liberal coalition government, Simić was named to the Croatian Ministry of Culture's committee for non-profit media in 2013, 2014, and 2015. The committee was relieved by the next and shortest nationalist-democrats coalition government.

With her band Drvena Marija (Wooden Mary), Simić took part in protests calling for the government's resignation organized by the far-left Workers' Front on 1 February 2016.

In 2017, Simić has signed the Declaration on the Common Language of the Croats, Serbs, Bosniaks and Montenegrins.

== Political work ==
Simić was an active member of Zagreb is OURS, a green-left political platform, since its start in 2017. Running for the European Parliament in the 2019 elections on the list of the Croatian left-green coalition We can!, she became the first Croatian openly lesbian politician.
