= HMS Hercules (1759) =

Third-rate ship of the line of the Royal Navy 1759–1784

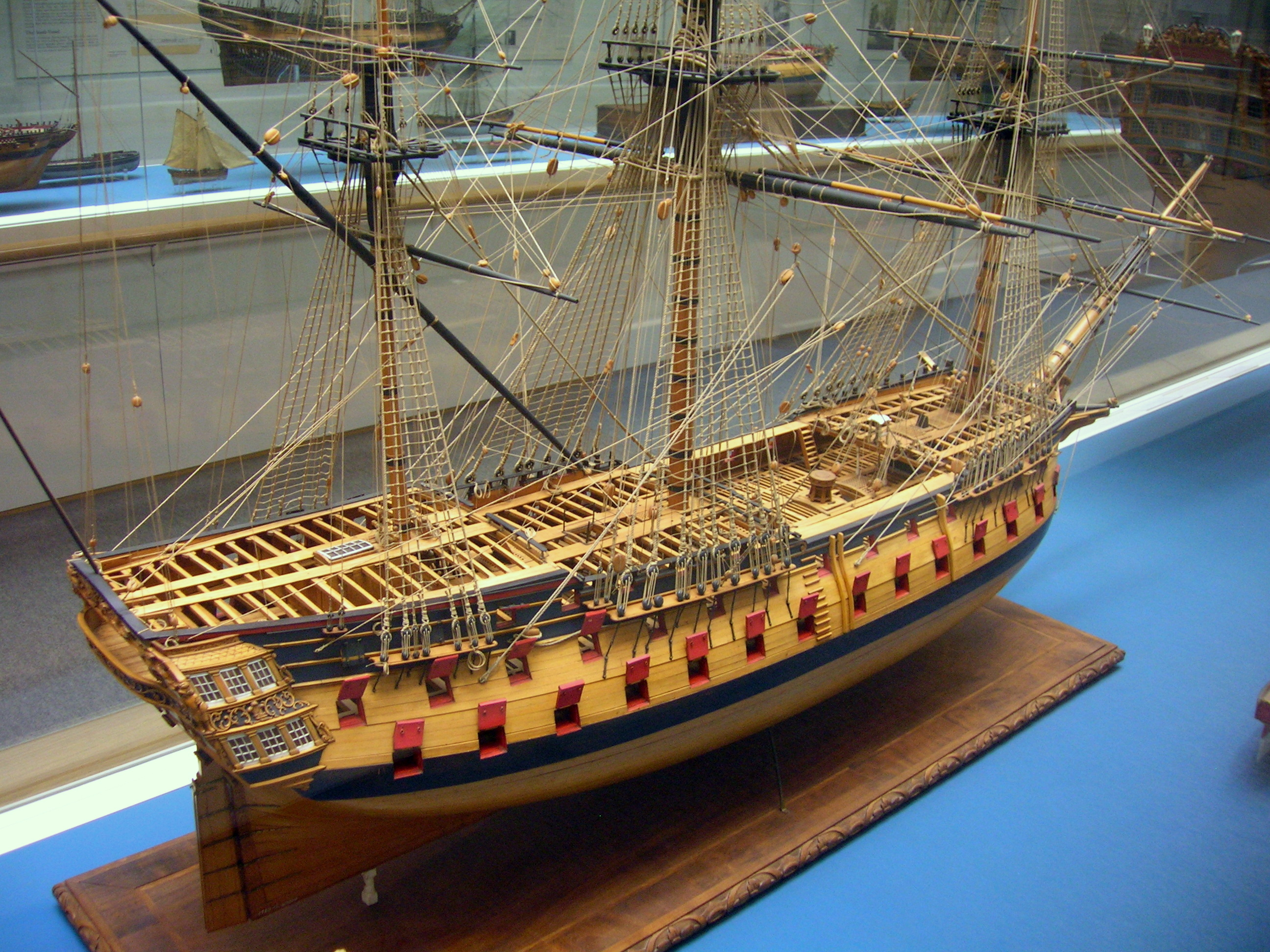
- Model of a 74-gun ship, third rate, circa 1760. Thought to be either HMS Hercules or HMS Thunderer from 1760.

History

Great Britain
- Name: HMS Hercules
- Ordered: 15 July 1756
- Builder: Deptford Dockyard
- Launched: 15 March 1759
- Fate: Sold out of the service, 1784

General characteristics
- Class & type: Hercules-class ship of the line
- Tons burthen: 160834/94 (bm)
- Length: 166 ft 6 in (50.75 m) (gundeck)
- Beam: 46 ft 6 in (14.17 m)
- Depth of hold: 19 ft 9 in (6.02 m)
- Propulsion: Sails
- Sail plan: Full-rigged ship
- Armament: 74 guns: Lower gundeck: 28 × 32 pdrs; Upper gundeck: 28 × 18 pdrs; Quarter deck: 14 × 9 pdrs; Forecastle: 4 × 9 pdrs

HMS Hercules was a 74-gun third-rate ship of the line of the Royal Navy, designed by Sir Thomas Slade and built at Deptford Dockyard by Adam Hayes and launched on 15 March 1759.

== Service history ==
On 20 November 1759, she took part in the huge conflict between the British and French fleets at the Battle of Quiberon Bay.

The ship took part as part of Admiral Rodney's fleet in the Battle of the Saintes under the command of Captain Henry Savage on 12 April 1782 against a French fleet, where she suffered six killed and 18 wounded. She was the third ship of the second wave in the part of the British line of battle and the first to hit the French flagship the Ville de Paris. Savage commanded from an armchair on the main deck due to his suffering from gout. Savage was injured in the chair, but the following treatment below deck reappeared in the chair in bandages.

She was paid off in July 1783 and sold at Plymouth in March 1784 for £1300.

== Officers of note ==
- Charles Brisbane midshipman on Hercules 1781/2
- Thomas Hurd was an officer on Hercules in 1782.
