= Valiant-class ship of the line =

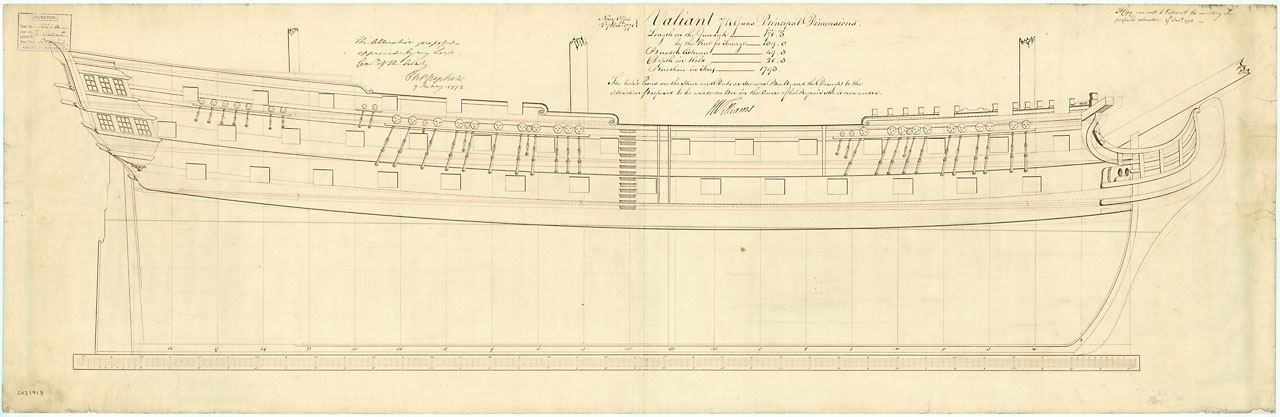
- Valiant-class

Class overview
- Name: Valiant
- Operators: Royal Navy
- Preceded by: Hercules class
- Succeeded by: Bellona class
- In service: 10 August 1759 - 1850
- Completed: 2

General characteristics
- Type: Ship of the line
- Length: 172 ft (52 m) (gundeck); 139 ft (42 m) (keel)
- Beam: 49 ft 8 in (15.14 m)
- Propulsion: Sails
- Armament: 74 guns: Gundeck: 28 × 32-pounders; Upper gundeck: 30 × 24-pounders; Quarterdeck: 10 × 9-pounders; Forecastle: 2 × 9-pounders
- Notes: Ships in class include: Valiant, Triumph

The Valiant-class ships of the line were a class of two 74-gun third rates of the Royal Navy.

== Design ==
The draught for the two Valiant-class ships was a copy of the lines of the captured French ship Invincible, which had been captured during the First Battle of Cape Finisterre. They were slightly longer than other British 74s of the time, and carried a significantly heavier armament (thirty 24-pounders on their upper gun decks as opposed to the twenty-eight 18-pounders found on the upper gun decks of all other British 74s at the time). The second of the two ships was launched in 1764, and there would not be another 'large' type 74 until the Mars-class, the first of which was launched in 1794.

== Ships ==
- HMS Valiant

Builder: Chatham Dockyard
Ordered: 21 May 1757
Launched: 10 August 1759
Fate: Broken up, 1826

- HMS Triumph

Builder: Woolwich Dockyard
Ordered: 21 May 1757
Launched: 3 March 1764
Fate: Broken up, 1850
