= Othello (1786 ship) =

British slave ship 1786–1796

History

Great Britain
- Name: Othello
- Namesake: Othello (character)
- Owner: 1786:Earle (Note: The Earles were a prominent family of merchants. They invested in several vessels, including this Othello, and its predecessor Othello, lost in 1783.); 1794:Hodgson
- Launched: 1786 at Liverpool
- Fate: Burnt 1796

General characteristics
- Tons burthen: 1786:122, or 130 (bm); 1790:208 (bm)
- Length: 68 ft 0 in (20.7 m)
- Beam: 21 ft 1 in (6.4 m) (above the wales)
- Depth of hold: 4 ft 1 in (1.2 m)
- Sail plan: Brig
- Complement: 1793: 25; 1793: 14
- Armament: February 1793: 6 × 4-pounder guns; December 1793: 10 × 3,4,&6-pounder guns
- Notes: Two decks and three masts

Othello was launched in 1786 at Liverpool for the African slave trade. She made some five voyages before she burnt off the coast of Africa in 1796. During her first voyage her master fired on another British slave ship, which gave rise to an interesting court case. As a letter of marque she recaptured a British ship in 1794.

== Career ==
Othello entered Lloyd's Register in 1787 with McGauley, master, Parke & Co. owner, and trade Liverpool-Africa.

Captain James McGauley sailed Othello from Liverpool on 20 December 1786, bound for the Bight of Biafra and Gulf of Guinea islands. At the coast of Cameroon he delivered trade goods to the natives, but payment, in the form of slaves, was slow in coming.

When the slave ship Banastre, Thomas Smith, master, arrived at Calabar, Captain Patrick Fairweather, of Tarleton, another vessel under the ownership of the Tarleton-Backhouse partnership, and a senior captain for them, sent Banastre to the coast of Cameroon. When she arrived there some natives in a canoe approached to trade with her, but were warned off by a shot from Othello that killed one of the natives. McGauley had ordered the shot fired because the natives on that coast owed him a debt and he had declared that he would permit no trade until they had paid him. In 1793 the case of Tarleton and others vs. McGauley came to trial with the plaintiffs suing McGauley for loss of trade. (Note: In the description of the case, Banastre is rendered as Banister.) The court found for the plaintiffs, establishing that it is a tort "to cause damage to a person by maliciously using any unlawful means, (e.g. fraud, or threats of assault), to induce anyone to abstain from entering into a contract with him."

McGauley eventually gathered slaves, and then delivered them to Dominica. He arrived on 2 December 1788 with 150 slaves, having embarked 185, for a mortality rate of 19%. (Note: Another source gives the number of slaves embarked as 164, for a loss rate of 8.5%.) She left Dominica on 1 February 1789, and arrived back at Liverpool on 16 March. Othello had a crew of 36 when she started out on the voyage and she lost 21 crew members during the voyage.

In 1790 Othello underwent lengthening and repairs. Her burthen increased from 122 to 208 tons. Captain John Powell sailed Othello on 16 March 1790 for the Bight of Biafra and Gulf of Guinea islands. He gathered his slaves at Cameroon, which he left on 20 October, and delivered his slaves to Grenada on 26 November. Othello had embarked 302 slaves and landed 277, for a loss rate of 8.3%. She left Grenada on 30 December and arrived back at Liverpool on 18 February 1791. She had also sailed with a crew of 26, and lost eight crew members on the voyage.

On 8 April 1791 Powell again sailed Othello to the same region. This time he gathered his slaves at Calabar. Othello left Africa on 6 November and delivered her slaves to Jamaica in December. She had embarked 273 slaves for a loss rate of 8.4%. She had also started with a crew of 24, two of whom died on the journey. During the voyage Captain William Hewitt replaced Powell. Othello arrived back at Liverpool on 16 March 1792.

Captain William Hewitt may have been the intended captain in 1793 for another voyage for the Bight of Biafra and Gulf of Guinea islands. However, Captain Thomas Jolly replaced Powell. The French Revolutionary Wars had just begun when Jolly received a letter of marque on 28 February.

Jolly sailed on 5 May 1792 and arrived at Calabar on 1 July. Othello left Africa on 17 March 1793, and arrived at Montego Bay on 20 May. She had embarked 316 slaves and landed 283, for a loss rate of 10.4%. She left Jamaica on 26 July and arrived back at Liverpool 25 September. She had started with a crew of 24 men and lost 9 on the voyage.

Captain David Christian received a letter of marque on 21 December 1793. He sailed Othello for West Central Africa and St. Helena on 14 January 1794.

On her way to deliver her slaves to Jamaica, on 4 November 1794 she recaptured Minerva. Minerva, Hayes, master, had been sailing from Cork to Saint Domingo when she was captured on 20 October. Othello sent Minerva into Antigua. Christian's letter of marque made the action legal.

Othello again delivered her slaves to Jamaica, where she arrived in July. She had embarked 342 slaves and had not lost any. Othello left Kingston on 13 October and arrived at Liverpool on 13 December. She had sailed with 31 crew and had eight men die.

On 22 June 1795 Christian again sailed Othello for the Bight of Biafra and Gulf of Guinea islands.

== Fate ==
Othella [sic] was reported to have burnt in Bonny River. This probably occurred in late 1795 or possibly in early 1796. (Note: Christian became master of Elliott later in 1796, and died in 1798 when he was master of Parr and she caught fire and blew up.) Othello may have embarked 120 slaves before she was lost, and if so, all may have died.
