= Othello (1781 ship) =

British merchant and slave ship 1769–1783

History

Great Britain
- Name: Othello
- Namesake: Othello (character)
- Owner: Heywood and Earl
- Launched: 1769 at Liverpool
- Fate: Wrecked 1783

General characteristics
- Tons burthen: 100, (bm)
- Sail plan: Brig
- Armament: 10 × 4-pounder guns
- Notes: Coppered 1780

Othello (or Ortello), was launched at Liverpool in 1769, possibly under the name Preston. Under the command of Captain James Johnson Othello made two voyages in the African slave trade in 1781 and 1782. She was lost at Tortola in 1783, during the second voyage.

== Some general background ==
Othello entered Lloyd's Register in 1781 with master James Johnson and William Earl (or Earle), owner. (Note: A database of slave voyages gives the primary owner as Benjamin Arthur Heywood, and the other owners as William Earle, Thomas Earle, William Earle (Jr), Thomas Parke, John Copland, and William Davenport. The Earles were a prominent family of merchants. They invested in several vessels, including Othello.) Othello had been lengthened in 1770, had undergone a good repair in 1778, and had received a large repair in 1780. At that time her name had been Preston.

== Transporting enslaved people ==
Othello was armed, and Johnson had received a letter of marque. He sailed from Liverpool on 1 July 1781, bound for Sierra Leone.

On the way Othello captured St Anne, of 300 tons (bm), which was sailing from Buenos Aires to Cádiz. St Anne was carrying 8,500 dry hides, 180 boxes of Peruvian bark (Cinchona), and four sacks of "fine Spanish wool". The value of the prize was put at £10,000, or £20,000, though it is not clear if that included the vessel as well. The prize-master sailed St Anne to Killybegs in September 1781 where he awaited orders from Heywood. He was concerned about the prevalence of French privateers in the Channel and the coast to Liverpool.

Johnson acquired captives in the Sierra Leone estuary and delivered them to Kingston, Jamaica, on 10 January 1782. Othello landed 190 captives. She had also had one of her 32 crewmen die on the voyage. She arrived back at Liverpool on 23 June.

== Loss ==
On his second voyage, Johnson sailed to the Windward Coast (an old name for the Ivory Coast), leaving Liverpool on 28 August 1782. He acquired captives in the region between the Rio Nuñez and the Assini River.

In spring 1783, Johnson's crew mutinied and captured the vessel. The second mate and the doctor recaptured her, but only after Johnson had died while trying to quell the mutiny. The ship was wrecked at Tortola at some point before 8 July. A total of 213 captives were rescued.

Lloyd's Register for 1783 has her name struck out and the notation "Lost".
