= Pauline Flanagan =

Irish-American stage and television actress

- Born: 29 June 1925; County Sligo
- Died: 28 June 2003 (aged 77); Ridgewood, New Jersey, United States
- Occupation: Actress
- Years active: 1957

Pauline Flanagan (29 June 1925 – 28 June 2003) was an Irish-born actress who had a long career on stage, she was best known in the United States for her role as Annie Colleary, on the television soap opera Ryan's Hope in 1979 and again in 1981. She later returned to the show as Sister Mary Joel.

== Biography ==
Flanagan was born in County Sligo, Ireland, to Patrick and Elizabeth (née Mulligan) Flanagan, who were deeply political and supported the Republican Anti-Treaty during the Irish Civil War, both served as Lord Mayor of Sligo. Flanagan was good friends with fellow Irish actresses Joan O'Hara and Paddy Croft. Flanagan spent much of the early 1950s touring with Anew McMaster, where she met Harold Pinter at the Gate's Pinter Festival.

She appeared in many Broadway plays, making her debut in 1957 with Dylan Thomas' Under Milk Wood. She starred in the 1976 Broadway revival of The Innocents. She appeared on Broadway in Philadelphia, Here I Come! in 1994.

Flanagan also acted in Off-Broadway productions several times working including with the Irish Repertory Theatre, including Juno and the Paycock (1995). She appeared in the Harold Prince play Grandchild of Kings at the Irish Repertory Theatre in February 1992, receiving the 1992 Outer Critics Circle Award nomination for Best Actress. Other Off-Broadway work included Yeats: A Celebration.

She acted in the play Summer, by Hugh Leonard at the Hudson Guild Theater, directed by Brian Murray. (Summer premiered at the Olney Theatre, Maryland, in August 1974.)

A resident of Glen Rock, New Jersey, she died at The Valley Hospital in Ridgewood, New Jersey one day before her 78th birthday of heart failure while suffering from lung cancer. She was survived by her husband, George Vogel (whom she married in 1958), a sister, Maura McNally, and her daughters Melissa Brown and Jane Holtzen.

== Awards and nominations ==
In 1997 she won the Barclays Theatre Awards for Best Actress in a Supporting Role for her role in Jennifer Johnston's Desert Lullaby, at the Lyric Theatre, Belfast. (The Barclays Theatre Awards are for outstanding regional theatre (including opera and dance) in the UK.)

She was nominated for the 1982 Drama Desk Award, Outstanding Featured Actress in a Play for Medea in which she performed on Broadway in 1982. In 2001 she won an Olivier Award, Best Supporting Actress, for her performance in Frank McGuinness' Dolly West's Kitchen at the Old Vic.
