= Return to Glennascaul =

- Orson Welles in Return to Glennascaul
- Directed by: Hilton Edwards
- Written by: Hilton Edwards
- Produced by: Micheál Mac Liammóir; Hilton Edwards
- Starring: Orson Welles
- Cinematography: Georg Fleischmann
- Edited by: Joseph Sterling
- Music by: Hans Gunther Stumpf
- Production company: Dublin Gate Theatre Productions
- Distributed by: Arthur Mayer-Edward Kingsley (US)
- Release date: 1951
- Running time: 23 minutes
- Country: Ireland
- Language: English

Return to Glennascaul, subtitled A Story That Is Told in Dublin (alternate title: Orson Welles' Ghost Story), is a 1951 Irish short film starring Orson Welles. It was written and directed by Hilton Edwards, produced by Micheál Mac Liammóir for Dublin Gate Theatre Productions and distributed by Arthur Mayer.

The plot is derived from the ubiquitous story of the vanishing hitchhiker. It is similar to Lucille Fletcher's original radio play, The Hitch-Hiker, which was first performed in 1941 on The Orson Welles Show starring Welles as the spooked driver.

== Plot summary ==
While taking a break from the filming of Othello, Orson Welles is driving in the Irish countryside one night when he offers a ride to a man with car trouble. The man, Sean Merriman, relates a strange event that happened to him at the same location.

Two women named Campbell, a mother and young adult daughter, flagged him down on a rainy night. They asked for a ride to their manor, “Glennascaul” (“Glen of the Shadows” in Irish). They invited him in for a drink. Merriman noted a Chinese print on the wall; the mother said it was one of many gifts from the daughter’s suitor, who lived in China for many years and never returned. The daughter admired Merriman’s engraved cigarette case, a legacy from an uncle who died in China long ago. The inscription “to PJM from Lucy, 1895” intrigued her. The grandfather clock striking one spurred Merriman to apologize and leave despite the daughter’s protests.

After departing, Merriman realized he left behind his cigarette case. He returned immediately but found the manor inexplicably locked up, deserted and decayed. Returning to Dublin, he tracked down a real estate agent named on a “for sale” sign on the ruined manor. The agent told him the two Campbell women died years ago in old age. He lent Merriman a set of keys to the manor. Upon re-entering Glennascaul, Merriman heard whispered voices, found all of the furnishings gone, and saw only his footprints from his previous visit in the dust on the floor. On the fireplace mantle was the cigarette case. As he heard the chimes of a clock that was no longer there, he fled the house. The voice of the daughter cried, "Don't go. You will come back?"

Having finished his tale, he shows the cigarette case to Welles, who is now sufficiently spooked. Merriman says he wrote the solicitor that handled the Campbell estate and learned that the daughter, Lucy, died eight years before he met them on the road. Welles drops off the man at his home. He leaves in a hurry when Merriman asks him in for “a cup of tea or something stronger” as the ghostly women had. As Welles drives off, he passes two flesh and blood women who wave for a ride and recognize the actor. He tries to hide his face as he speeds past.

== Cast ==
- Michael Laurence as Sean Merriman
- Shelah Richards as Mrs. Campbell
- Helena Hughes as Lucy Campbell
- John Dunne as Daly
- Isobel Couser as The Short Woman
- Ann Clery as The Tall Woman
- Orson Welles as himself (credited as “Introduced by Orson Welles”)

== Awards ==
The film was nominated for an Oscar for Best Short Subject.

== Releases ==
This film is only 23 minutes long and is an extra on the recently released reissued DVD of Welles' Othello. It was also released as Orson Welles' Ghost Story.
