= Dolly West's Kitchen =

1999 play by Frank McGuinness

Dolly West's Kitchen is a dark Irish and deeply Chekhovian play written by the playwright Frank McGuinness. It was first staged in the Abbey Theatre, Dublin, in 1999. Set during the Second World War in the town of Buncrana, County Donegal, the play tells the story of the West family and how they deal with the war in Europe and the war that ensues in their very own kitchen.

== Plot ==
The play is set in 1943 during the Second World War in the small town of Buncrana, on the border with Derry, Northern Ireland, during the Emergency. Dolly West is home after fleeing Italy before the war. She runs the household for her elderly mother Rima, her elder sister Esther and her younger brother Justin. Also living in the house is Esther's husband Ned and the housemaid Anna. Justin, a junior officer in the Irish army, is deeply nationalistic and in favour of Irish neutrality.

But questions are asked of the neutrality of both Ireland and the house, when three foreigners are invited across the border into the house by Rima. The first is Alec, an English officer and former lover of Dolly's. The other two are American soldiers, Marco and Jamie. Soon clashes over issues of loyalty, jealousy, sexual identity and love creep into Dolly West's kitchen.

== Characters ==
- Dolly West - not a stereotypical 1940s' Irish girl, she is educated, traveled and not married; she returned home from Florence because of the war
- Esther Horgan - Dolly's unhappily married sister, who is like her father
- Justin West - Dolly's volatile nationalistic Irish officer brother
- Rima West - the mother of the house, Rima is a very unconventional and wise woman
- Ned Horgan - Esther's husband
- Marco Delavicario - a flamboyantly homosexual American soldier stationed in Derry
- Jamie O'Brien - Marco's Irish-American cousin who is also an American soldier
- Alec Redding - Dolly's former lover from college, and now British soldier stationed in Derry
- Anna Owens - the young housemaid for the West family

== Original production ==
The premiere of Dolly West's Kitchen, directed by Patrick Mason, took place on 6 October 1999 in the Abbey Theatre, Dublin. The original cast was:

- Dolly West - Donna Dent
- Esther Horgan - Catherine Byrne
- Justin West - Michael Colgan
- Rima West - Pauline Flanagan
- Ned Horgan - Simon O'Gorman
- Marco Delavicario - Perry Laylon Ojeda Perry ojeda
- Jamie O'Brien - Harry Carnahan
- Alec Redding - Anthony Calf
- Anna Owens - Lucianne McEvoy

== Awards ==
- 2001 Olivier Awards - Nomination - Best New Play
- 2001 Olivier Awards - Winner (Pauline Flanagan) - Best Supporting Actress
