= Someone Who'll Watch Over Me =

1992 play by Frank McGuinness

Someone Who'll Watch over Me is a play written by Irish dramatist Frank McGuinness. The play focuses on the trials and tribulations of an Irishman, an Englishman and an American (Edward, Michael, and Adam) who are kidnapped and held hostage by unseen Arabs in Lebanon. As the three men strive for survival they also strive to overcome their personal and nationalistic differences. Related to this is each individual's own attempt to maintain sanity under the watchful eye of both captors and supposed comrades. At times the dramatic dialogue reaches a level of Beckettian absurdity, as even the audience is unable to draw a distinction between the characters' insanity and humour. We are made witness and accomplice to a humour based on something apparently ghastly, the loss of rationality.

== Productions ==
The play was first staged in July 1992, at the Hampstead Theatre, London and transferred to the West End Vaudeville Theatre for September to October 1992.

It was produced on Broadway at the Booth Theatre, opening on 29 May 1992 and closing on 13 June 1993, after 292 performances and 2 previews. Directed by Robin Lefevre, it starred Stephen Rea (Edward), James McDaniel (Adam), and Alec McCowen (Michael); Michael York took the Michael role late in the play's run. It received Tony Award nominations for Best Play and Best Actor in Play (Stephen Rea); Stephen Rea received the Theatre World Award. The show won the 1993 New York Drama Critics' Circle Award for Best Foreign Play.

It was produced at the West End New Ambassador Theatre 16 April – 22 May 2005, where reviewer Peggy Nuttall wrote: "...the best thing I've seen in a long time." Directed by Dominic Dromgoole, the play starred Jonny Lee Miller (Adam), Aidan Gillen (Edward) and David Threlfall (Michael).

Someone Who'll Watch Over Me was presented in January 2009 at the Carolina Actors Studio Theatre in Charlotte. More recently it was produced by the "Square Béal Theatre Company", showing in Virginia and Shercock, Co. Cavan during September and October 2010 and by Theatre by the Lake, Keswick, Cumbria from August to November 2011. It was also put on at the Courtyard Theatre in London in July 2010 starring Tom Weston-Jones, Joe Jameson & Alasdair Buchan.

In March 2013, on the 20th anniversary of the play's first staging in Ireland, Creaking Door Productions performed the play at The Viking Theatre and The New Theatre. Directed by Niall O'Higgins, the show starred Art Kearns (Edward), Danny Kehoe (Michael) and Conor Delaney (Adam). The show had a very successful run receiving 5 star reviews. (Someone-Who'll-Watch-Over-Me Review)

In May/June 2017 it was produced by the Irish Theatre Players in Perth, Western Australia. Directed by Andrew Baker, the show starred Paul Davey (Edward), Manuao TeAotonga (Adam) & Grant Malcolm (Michael). It was extremely well received, with many stating it was the best show the Irish Theatre Players had produced in decades. http://www.ita.org.au/2017/06/someone-wholl-watch-over-me/
