= Observe the Sons of Ulster Marching Towards the Somme =

Play written by Frank McGuinness

Observe the Sons of Ulster Marching Towards the Somme is a 1985 play by Frank McGuinness.

== Plot synopsis ==
The play centres on the experiences of eight unionist Ulstermen who volunteer to serve in the 36th (Ulster) Division at the beginning of the First World War. The story is told in a nostalgic flashback from the viewpoint of the only surviving soldier of the eight (now an unmarried old man). The play reaches a climax at the start of the terrible Battle of the Somme on July 1, 1916 – the anniversary of the Battle of the Boyne in 1690 – in which the Ulster Division suffered heavy casualties. It explores how both the Boyne and the Somme have come to have a significant place in Northern Ireland unionist consciousness. Stylistically typical of McGuinness's art, the narrative also decentres the constructed ideals of homosocial institutions, such as the military. What is somewhat ironic and notable in the play is that, though the main character throughout the play (Kenneth Pyper) is from an upper-class background, he does not join the army as an officer. This suggests Pyper's unwillingness to be part of the aristocratic society and, as well, to challenge his homosexuality. This theory is confirmed through subtext conveyed by Pyper to his Protestant comrade and boyfriend.

The play in general has many themes running through it, including homosexuality, homophobia, the inner conflict of self-respect, bravery and patriotism. The play, at some points, changes scenes from one pair of actors to the other, and then back again, to simulate the brief flashbacks of the narrator as well as increasing tension at some points in the play.

== Production history ==
It was first staged on the Peacock Stage of the Abbey Theatre, in Dublin in 1985. The play subsequently opened in London at the Hampstead Theatre in July 1986, directed by Michael Attenborough. It was revived by the Hampstead Theatre for a short run in June 2009.

=== Premiere cast and crew ===
- Geoffrey Golden – Kenneth Pyper (elder)
- Bosco Hogan – Kenneth Pyper (younger)
- Lorcan Cranitch – David Craig
- Oliver Maguire – George Anderson
- Ian McElhinney – Nat McIlwaine
- Tom Hickey – Christopher Roulston
- Michael James Ford – Martin Crawford
- Mark Lambert – William Moore
- Niall O'Brien – John Millen
- Director - Patrick Mason
- Designer - Frank Hallinan Flood

== Reception ==
It received several awards and accolades, most notably the London Evening Standard Award for Most Promising Playwright and the Christopher Ewart-Biggs Memorial Prize.
