= George Atkinson (artist) =

Irish artist and educator

Professor George Atkinson R.H.A., A.R.C.A.
- Born: 18 September 1880; Queenstown (Cobh), County Cork, Ireland
- Died: 24 March 1941 (aged 60); National College of Art, Dublin, Ireland
- Resting place: Mount Jerome Cemetery, Dublin, Ireland
- Education: Crawford School of Art, Cork, Ireland; Royal College of Art, London, England
- Known for: etching, engraving, mezzotint, painting, design
- Elected: Royal Hibernian Academy, Royal College of Art

Signature
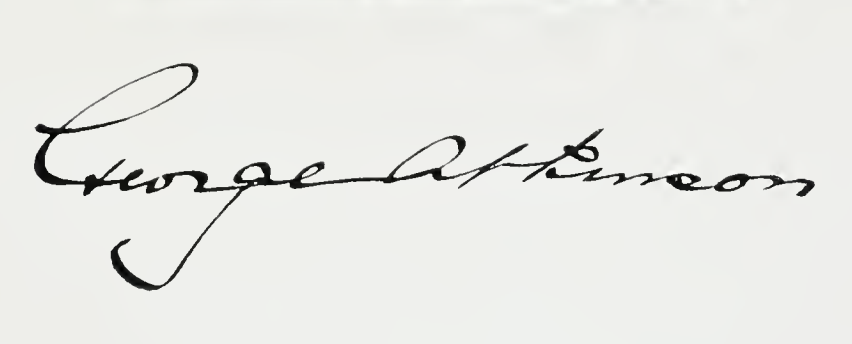

George Atkinson (18 September 1880 – 24 March 1941) was an Irish designer, printmaker, painter, and educator. Born in County Cork, Ireland, he became the director of the National College of Art in Dublin and played a significant role in the development of art education and the arts and crafts movement in Ireland during the early 20th century.

== Early life and education ==
George Atkinson was born in 1880 in Queenstown (now Cobh), the son of Thomas W. R. Atkinson, a Protestant timber mill owner and merchant. He decided to pursue art after he was inspired by the painter James Barry, also from Cork. He attended the Crawford School of Art in Cork from 1897, and worked in Dublin in from 1902.

In 1905, Atkinson moved to London to study at the Royal College of Art and was taught there by the prominent printmaker Frank Short. He remained there until 1910 before returning to Ireland. His artistic education focused on etching, mezzotint, and typography.

== Career ==
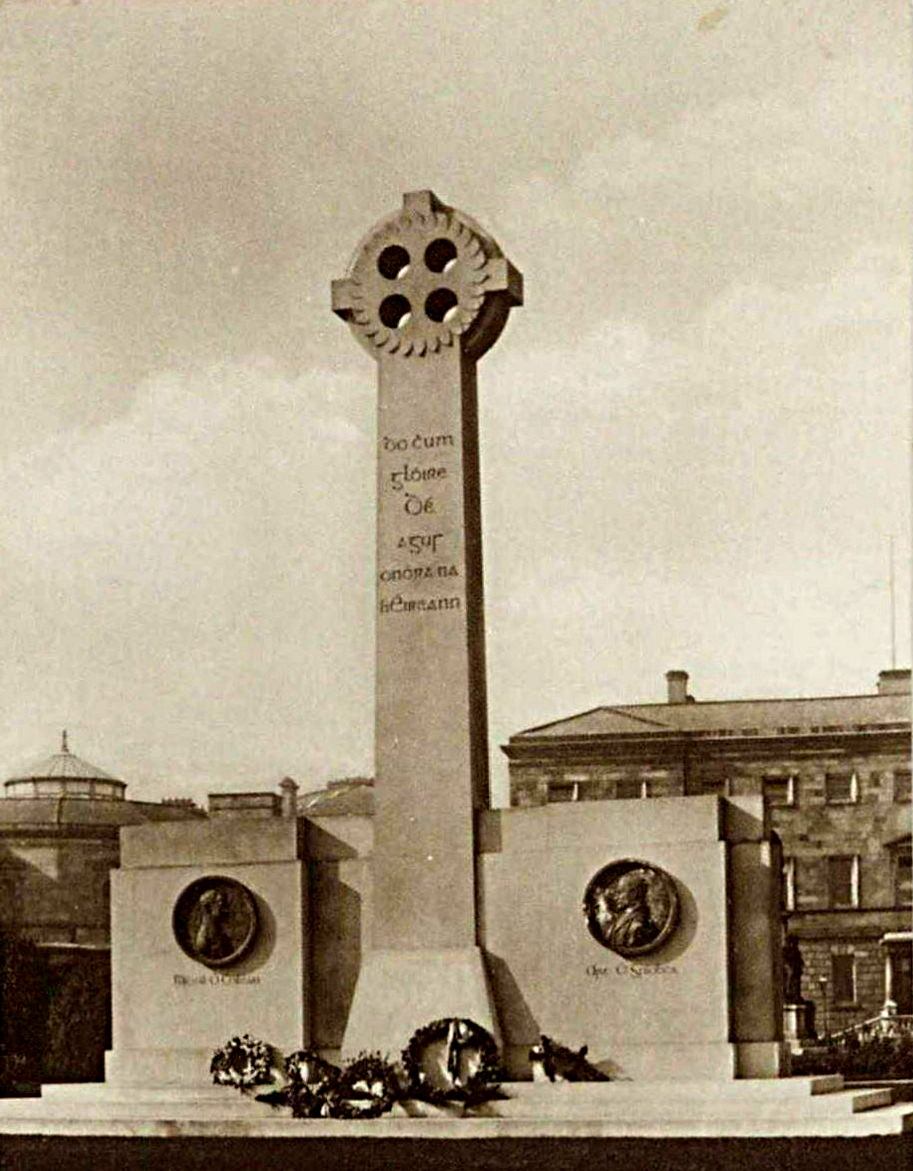
The former Griffith-Collins Cenotaph, Leinster Lawn, Dublin

He first exhibited his work in 1911 at the Royal Hibernian Academy of Arts (RHA), becoming a full member of the institution in 1916. In 1914, he began working as the assistant headmaster at the Dublin Metropolitan School of Art. In 1918, he was appointed head of the school, perhaps causing the reduction in his artistic output over the following years.

Atkinson organised the 1921 exhibition of the Arts and Crafts Society of Ireland, at which he had exhibited works in previous years. He was one of the main organisers of an exhibition at the Galerie Barbazanges in association with the 1922 World Congress of the Irish Race in Paris.

After the Irish War of Independence and establishment of the Irish Free State in 1922, Atkinson designed a temporary cenotaph which featured medallion busts by sculptor Albert Power commemorating Arthur Griffith and Michael Collins. The monument was unveiled in August 1923 and stood on Leinster Lawn in Dublin until 1939. Atkinson furnished the Celtic inscriptions on the presentation scroll for Mia Cranwill's Senate Casket, commissioned by senator Alice Stopford Green to hold to a scroll signed by the first members of the Free State Seanad.

Shannon Scheme etchings
(c. 1926–1929)

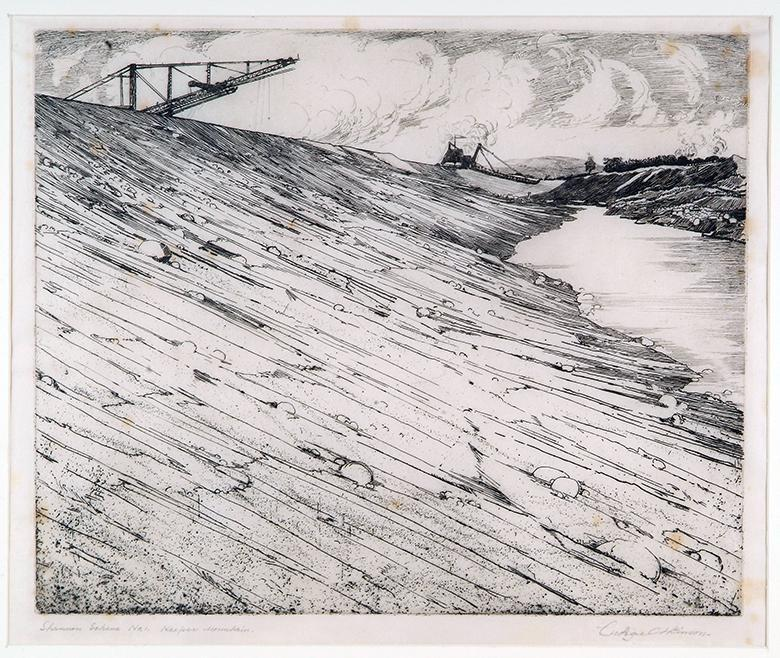
1: Keeper Mountain

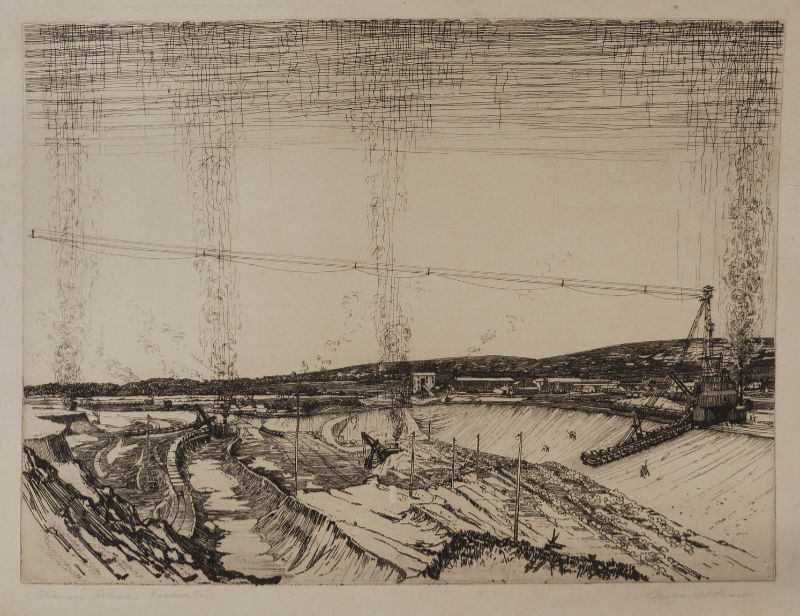
3: The Excavations

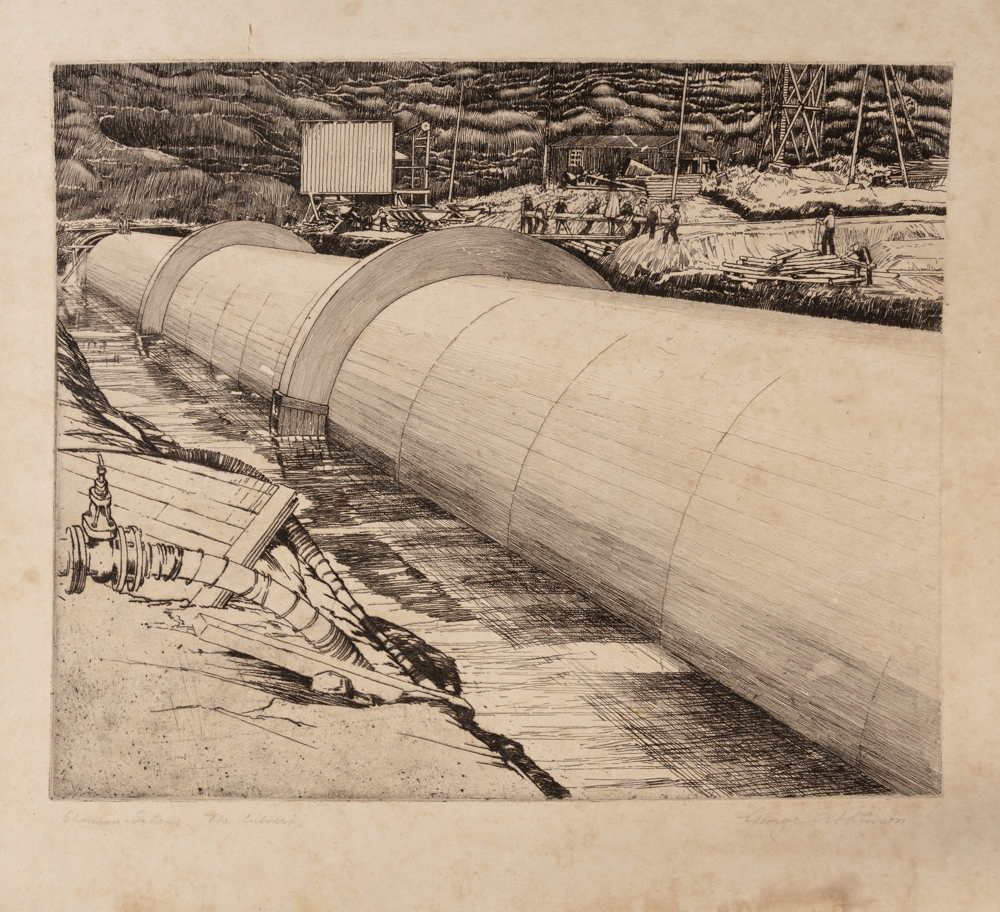
2: The Culvert

Atkinson created a series of three etchings as part of a government commission to document the construction of the Free State's ambitious Shannon hydroelectric scheme, beginning in 1925. Shannon Scheme No. 2: The Culvert was displayed at the 1933 Chicago World's Fair, to which an Irish delegation was sent by the government to showcase the new state's modernity. In this period he also continued his work to promote Irish arts culture, becoming the treasurer and organiser of the arts section of the Tailteann Games in 1924, 1928 and 1932, later becoming a trustee and chair of the finance committee.

As of 1926 he sat on the art advisory committee of the Dublin Municipal Gallery of Modern Art, and was credited as an accomplished etcher and painter, responsible for reviving the mezzotint technique in Ireland after it had fallen out of use for 100 years. In 1926 he also created the memorial to Thomas William Lyster, a bronze plaque with silver inscriptions in the National Library of Ireland, on behalf of W. B. Yeats and the Friends of the National Library.

Commemorative stamp designs

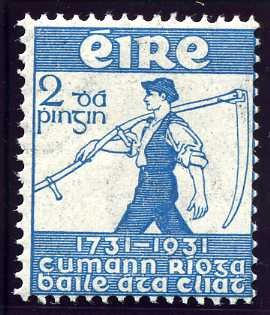
200 years of the Royal Dublin Society (1931)

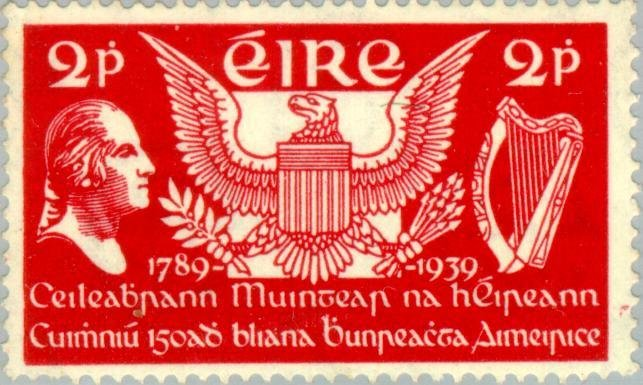
150 years of the US constitution and presidential office (1939)

In 1931, Atkinson designed a postage stamp to mark the 200th anniversary of the Royal Dublin Society. He was also responsible for the design of the 1939 postage stamp celebrating the 150th anniversary of the U.S. Constitution and the installation of its first President. As of 1939 he had become the secretary of the RHA and was active in its ongoing struggle to rebuild after the organisation's main building and collection of artworks had been destroyed by fire in the Easter Rising.

As part of the Gibson Bequest committee, Atkinson worked over the 1920s and 1930s to expand the collection of artworks at the Cork School of Art (now at Crawford Art Gallery). In 1936, Atkinson was appointed Director of the Metropolitan School of Art, retaining this position when it became the National College of Art. He held this position until his death in 1941.

== Personal life and death ==
Atkinson married in 1916 and the couple had two children. He had a long-running feud with colleague Seán Keating. Atkinson was found dead by suicide in his office at the National College of Art on 24 March 1941. He is buried in Mount Jerome Cemetery in Dublin.
