= The Breadman (play) =

The Bread Man is a 1990 play by the Irish playwright Frank McGuinness.

== Synopsis ==
The Bread Man is set in Donegal in 1970. It follows a man, Sinner Courtney who is coming to terms with the death of his father who delivered bread.

== Production history ==
The play premiered at the Gate Theatre on October 2, 1990. The production was directed by Andy Hinds and designed by Francis O'Connor.

In 2019 the Alingham Arts Festival commissioned a new production of the play directed by Keith Robinson.

== Casting history ==
Character	Original Cast, 1990	Alingham Festival Cast, 2019
Eddie Rodgers	Brendan Ellis	Sean McLoone
George Crilly	Peter Hanly	Terence McEneaney
Simon Breslin	Robert Taylor	Diarmuid McInerney
Susan Crilly	Anna Healy	Roisin Lee-Fox
Niall Wilmot	John Bergin	Niall McKee
Florence Courtney	Susan Fitzgerald	Emer McShea
The Sinner Courtney	Jim Norton	Michael McMullin
Tommy Courtney	Bosco Hogan	Conor Carney
Rose Kiely	Pat Leavy	Ailis McIntyre
James Kiely	Michael Gormley	Mark Kirby
Dan Courtney	Hugh O'Conor	Ronan Drummond
Pat Courtney	Maureen O'Brien	Farah Bogle
Albert Casey	Eamon Rohan	Ken Monaghan
