= Lee Watson =

Broadway lighting designer

Leland H. "Lee" Watson (1926 – December 8, 1989)^{7} was a Broadway and television lighting designer and theatre educator.^{5} His 1990 bio states that he worked "extensively in nearly all fields of lighting design."^{6}

== Early life and education ==
Watson was born in Charleston, Illinois and is a graduate of the University of Iowa. After military service that included fighting in the Battle of the Bulge, where his left hand was paralyzed, he returned to the US and received a Master of Fine Arts from Yale University in 1952.^{7} Lee often spoke of his Yale classmate, Lighting designer Tharon Musser and struggling to survive in New York, "eating oranges that fell from fruit trucks."

== Broadway Lighting Design ==
Watson designed lighting for 42 Broadway productions,^{6} from 1955-1961. Watson's first Broadway design was Harbor Lights which opened on October 4, 1956. Watson was lighting designer for the Tony Award-winning world premiere of The Diary of Anne Frank alongside Tony Award-winning Scenic designer Boris Aronson and Tony award-nominee Susan Strasberg as Anne in 1956. Other noted designs included the world premiere of Arthur Miller's A View from the Bridge with award-winning actor Richard Harris (1956), and A Moon for the Misbegotten at the now-demolished Bijou Theatre (1956).^{6} ^{7}

The Internet Broadway Database (IBDB) notes that Watson also designed Girls of Summer and Protective Custody in 1956, the musical review Mask and Gown, The Cave Dwellers, Miss Isobel, and the musical comedy Portofino in 1957. Lighting Designs in 1958 included the musical comedy review The Next President for which he is also credited as Scenic Designer, The Night Circus and Suddenly Last Summer off-Broadway at the York Playhouse with Anne Meacham. In 1959, he designed The Legend of Lizzie. 1960 brought A Lovely Light (also Scenic Design), The Importance of Being Oscar (also Scenic Designer), and in 1961, Do you Know the Milky Way? The New York Public Library now holds his papers. The Lee Watson papers date from 1941 to 1989 and document his career as a lighting educator and designer for theater, opera, and other live events. The collection holds lighting and scenic designs, photographs, slides, and production files that contain programs, newspaper articles, scripts, and technical lighting materials.

== Off Broadway, TV, Opera, Ballet Lighting Design ==
For 12 years, he lighted numerous Off-Broadway productions and worked in New York City with CBS network TV and other television groups.^{7} His lighting credits include over 60 operas, The Seattle World's Fair, The Cincinnati Ballet, regional theatres, industrial shows, and many architectural projects.^{6} The Internet Movie Database shows that Do you Know the Milky Way? was actually a documentary short directed by Colin Low. Watson is listed in the IMDB as the lighting director in 1951 for one of the first episodes of the 1950s game show Down You Go, filmed in Chicago for the Dumont Television Network.

== Teaching at Purdue University ==
Watson taught lighting design at Purdue University in the graduate scenography program and undergraduate theatre core until 1989. His students remember his precise questions about a project's clues as to the design needed.^{5} The dancer Loie Fuller was a favorite subject when describing the integration of light with performance.^{10}

== Death ==
Watson died at home in Lafayette, IN in 1989 after a long struggle with Leukemia.^{5} After his death, a bright, periwinkle bowtie was attached to the lighting grid in the (now defunct) Experimental Theatre in Stewart Center on the Purdue campus.^{5} He was survived by his parents, Dallas V. and Hazel Dooley Watson of Charleston.^{7}

== Affiliations ==
Watson served on the board of directors of the International Association of Lighting Designers and of United Scenic Artists local #829 in New York City. He was formerly president of the United States Institute for Theatre Technology (1980–82) and a USITT Fellow, as well as holder of a USITT Founders' Award.

== Watson Memorial Scholarship ==
The Watson Memorial Scholarship Endowment Fund in memory of Dallas, Hazel and Leland Watson is given by the Hazel Watson Scholarship foundation, which was established through private contributions as a tribute to Mrs. Hazel Watson, one of Coles County's most prominent community leaders,^{9} and is offered to a student who is currently accepted and enrolled at Eastern Illinois University with a major of study in business, political science, or theatre with a preference given to theatrical lighting.^{8}

== Books ==
Watson spent his final years revising two books, one on the practice of lighting design and also the history. Watson lamented that his publishers had asked him to separate the history books into smaller projects, which he agreed to do, then ended agreements with several publishers. Watson worried on more than one occasion that his parents, who were his only living family, would dispose of all the history materials, stacked neatly with hundreds of photos in his Purdue office. At the time of his death, the history was not published.

- Theatrical Lighting Practice by Joel Rubin and Leland H. Watson, 1968^{3}
- Lighting Design Handbook (1990)^{4}
- History of Lighting Design (unpublished at the time of his death)^{5}
