= Johann Heinrich Joseph Düntzer =

German philologist and historian of literature (1813–1901)

Johann Heinrich Joseph Düntzer (July 12, 1813 – December 16, 1901) was a German philologist and historian of literature.

== Biography ==
He was born at Cologne. After studying philology and especially ancient classics and Sanskrit at Bonn and Berlin (1830–1835), he took the degree of doctor of philosophy and established himself in 1837 at Bonn as privatdozent for classical philology. He had already, in his Goethes Faust in seiner Einheit und Ganzheit (1836) and Goethe als Dramatiker (1837), advocated a new critical method in interpreting the German classics, which he wished to see treated like the ancient classics.

He subsequently turned his attention almost exclusively to the poets of the German classical period, notably Goethe and Schiller. Düntzer's method met with much opposition and he consequently failed to obtain the professorship he coveted. From 1846 up to the time of his death in 1901 he maintained the post of librarian at the Roman Catholic gymnasium in Cologne. In 1849 he was awarded with the title of professor.

== Evaluation ==
Düntzer was a painstaking and accurate critic, but lacking in inspiration and finer literary taste, consequently his work as a biographer and commentator has, to a great extent, been superseded and discredited.

== Works ==
Among his philological writings may be mentioned:

- Die Lehre von der lateinischen Wortbildung (1836).
- Die Deklination der indogermanischen Sprachen (1839).
- Homer und der epische Kyklos (1839).
- Die homerischen Beiwörter des Götter- und Menschengeschlechts (1859).

Of his works on the German classical poets, especially Goethe, Schiller and Herder, the following are particularly worthy of note:

- Erläuterungen zu den deutschen Klassikern (1853–1892).
- Goethes Prometheus und Pandora (1850).
- Goethes Faust (2 vols., 1850–1851; 2nd edition 1857).
- Goethes Götz und Egmont (1854).
- Aus Goethes Freundeskreise (1868).
- Abhandlungen zu Goethes Leben und Werken (2 vols, 1885).
- Goethes Tagebücher der sechs ersten weimarischen Jahre (1889).
- Goethes Leben (1880; 2nd edition 1883; Engl. transl. by T Lyster, London, 1884): "Life of Goethe", Vol.1, "Life of Goethe", Vol.2.
- Schillers Leben (1881); translated into English and published as: The Life of Schiller (1883).
- Schiller und Goethe (1859).
- Übersicht und Erläuterung zum Briefwechsel zwischen Schiller und Goethe (1859).
- Herders Reise nach Italien (1859).
- Aus Herders Nachlass (3 vols., 1856–1857).
- Charlotte von Stein (1874).
