= Thomas William Lyster =

Irish librarian (1855–1922)

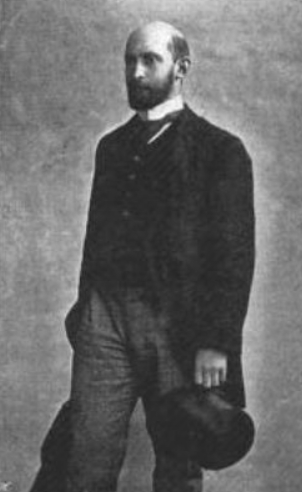
- In The Sketch, 18 December 1895
- Born: 17 December 1855; Kilkenny, Ireland
- Died: 12 December 1922 (aged 66); Dublin, Ireland
- Education: Trinity College Dublin
- Occupation: Librarian
- Spouse: Jane Robinson Campbell

Thomas William Lyster (1855–1922) was an Irish librarian and writer, director of the National Library of Ireland in Dublin between 1895 and his retirement in 1920.

== Early life and family ==
Thomas William Lyster was born 17 December 1855 in County Kilkenny to parents Thomas Lyster of Rathdowney and Jane Lyster (née Smith) of Roscrea. Lyster with his family moved to Dublin in his youth, where he remained throughout his life.

== Education ==
Initially, Lyster attended the Wesleyan Connexional School, which was founded by a group of Methodists Ministers in 1845 at St Stephens Green. After his initial schooling at Wesleyan, Lyster then attended Trinity College for further education. The admissions register of Trinity indicates Lyster enrolled into University in October 1872 at the age of 16. His enrolment was listed as "pensioner" which at the time was common and indicated he paid a set annual fee for his education and did not have any form of scholarship or fee assistance. The register also indicates at the time of entry to Trinity, that his father had no profession and that his religious background was the Church of Ireland. In the winter of 1877 Lyster graduated with a Bachelor of Arts with Honours and in the winter of 1879, he was awarded a Master of Arts.

== Early Published Work ==
While Lyster became primarily known for his role within the National Library of Ireland, he was also a well-respected author. His early work included a translation of Düntzer's "Life Of Goethe" which he translated and expanded in 1883. By 1893 he had edited and published his first original work, an anthology of Poetry titled "English Poems for young students" which ended up becoming an intermediate certificate text. In addition to his original work, Lyster was well documented to be very supportive of other writers. Most notably he encouraged W. B. Yeats' passion for writing and helped him with edits to his original manuscript of "The Island of Statues" that was published by Yeats in 1885.

== Employment to the National Library ==
In 1878, shortly after graduating university, Thomas Lyster officially joined the National Library of Ireland, and would be appointed assistant librarian at only twenty-three years of age. In 1895 Lyster would succeed William Archer as head librarian in until his retirement in 1920.

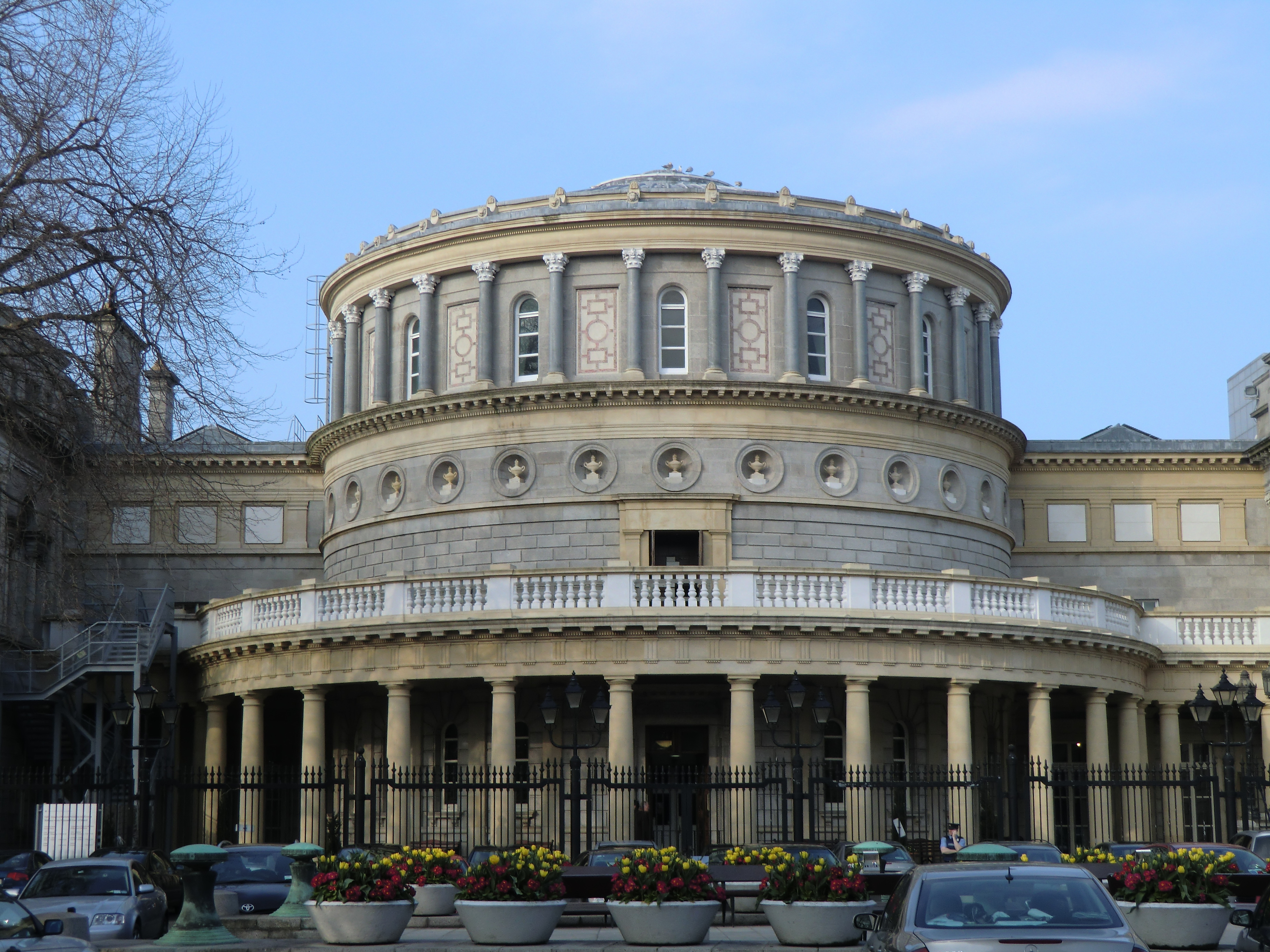
National Library of Ireland

== Career in the National Library of Ireland ==
During his time within the National Library, Lyster would become a strong advocate for the Dewey Classification System increasing accessibility of the libraries inventory to the public. Lyster would permit students to access the classified collection within the library, as well as making periodicals available at the library counter, increasing readership numbers dramatically. Lyster would later endorse reading materials for young children, providing them with designated spaces in the library, with books on topics such as poetry, geography, and science. Furthermore, Lyster's pragmatic and positive attitude would draw the attention of various readers from the library, many of whom would seek his advice and assistance. Renowned Irish author W.B. Yeats would remark that Thomas Lyster had initially encouraged him to write, and would describe him as the most zealous man he'd known.

== Library Association of Ireland ==
Thomas Lyster would go on to play a pivotal role in the establishment of Cumann na Leabharlann (The Library Association of Ireland) and the Irish Rural Libraries Association. Lyster would later be elected as the organisation's vice-president in 1899, and begin a series of public lectures advocating for the expansion of the public library system. The Library Association would be established in 1904, with the aim to promote the establishment of public libraries. In 1904, Lyster would object that it was not a pertinent time for an organisation such as this to be created, however he did voice his support for the eventual creation of an organisation in the future. Thomas Lyster would continue to serve as director of the National Library of Ireland until his retirement from the organisation in 1920.

== Later life ==
In 1903 Thomas Lyster published his work called 'The idea of a great public library' in the Library Association Record, which was inspired by John Henry Newman and his work The idea of a university. Near the end of this paper, Lyster argues against censorship and writes that "in a great library all things, good an evil, fall into their places, are seen in the just light, and proportion, and the totality of the record of human thought and feeling is a witness for what is wholesome, true and good".

Thomas Lyster was also known for the critical papers he published in The Academy and for his papers on library technique and theory. Although he published a lot of his own work, he was also known to regularly contribute to literary journals. His two articles 'Edward Dowen and his work' and 'Carlyle in Dublin' were both published in the Irish Book Lover in 1914 and 1920.

The same year that Thomas Lyster retired from his position as the director of the National Library of Ireland in 1920, he married Jane Robinson Campbell, on 28 December in Dublin.

== Death ==
Thomas and Jane were married for just under two years when Lyster died on 12 December 1922 at his home, 10 Harcourt Terrace, Dublin. After he died, it was his wife Jane who survived him. In his death notice published by The Irish Times on 16 December, no cause of death is reported but, it does state that he died suddenly.

== Legacy ==
Following his death Thomas William Lyster was remembered again in Oliver St John Gogarty's novel "As I Was Going Down Sackville Street". He was portrayed consistently in both this story and in James Joyce's famed "Ulysses" as an enthusiastic and helpful character who was always called upon to help the people in the library. He is still known as "The Quaker Librarian" in Joyce's work, though Lyster was noted as being a member of the Church of Ireland, and is a benign and kind hearted figure in Joyce's tale. This trait is common between the two novels which indicate a passion for learning and spreading knowledge as a core virtue of his character.

A memorial plaque to him is in place at the National Library, which was presented in March 1926 by W. B. Yeats on behalf of the Friends of the National Library. The text of the plaque was also composed by Yeats, who was not only a prominent member of the society but also a close friend of Lyster, the two attending many library openings and events together. It describes Lyster as an enlightened book lover and one who was eager to help the library's visitors. The memorial, a bronze plaque with silver inscriptions by George Atkinson, was installed near the entry to the main reading room.

He is also still remembered through a portrait drawn by John Butler Yeats, father of W.B. Yeats, that is hung within the library and preserved in their archives.

His wife, Jane Robinson Lyster, established a bequest in 1946 in his memory within his alma mater Trinity College Dublin. This fund is one of the college's Moderatorship Prizes and is focused on the History discipline within the institution.

== Works ==
- 1883: Heinrich Düntzer's Life of Goethe. London: Macmillan & Co. (translation)
- 1893: Select Poetry for Young Students; 2nd ed
- 1900: A series of volumes called English Poems for Young Students (editor)
- 1900: Observations on Shelf-classification. Chicago: H. Marshall & Son. (Author)
- Intermediate School Anthology
