= Fit-up =

Style of theatre

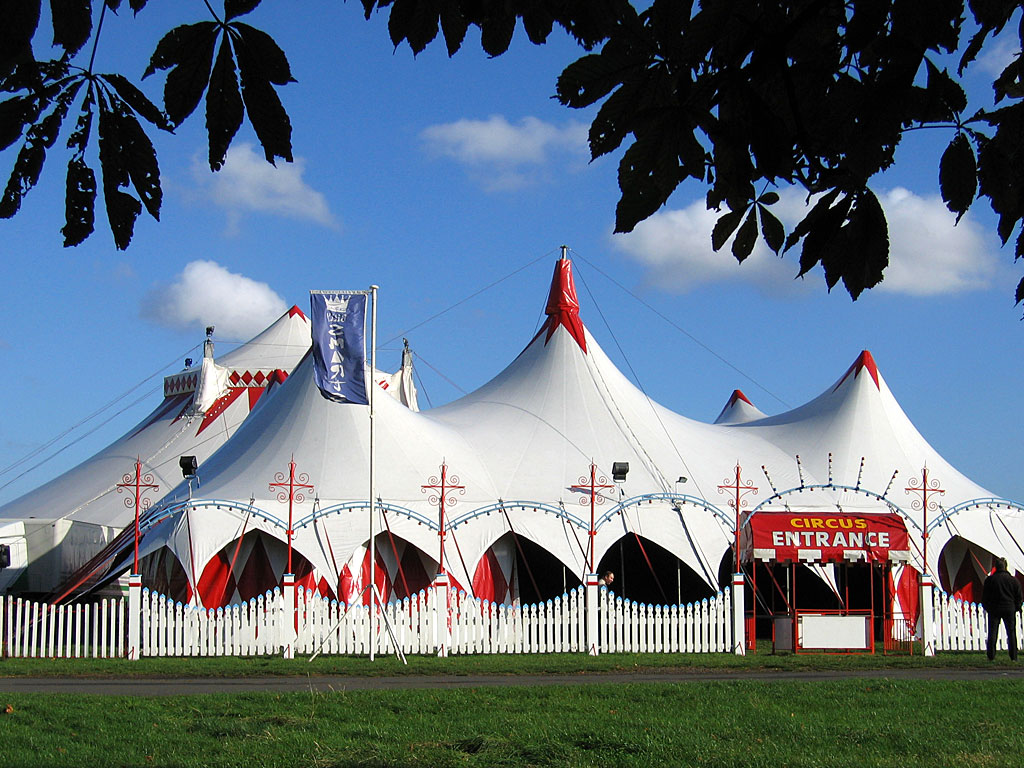
A circus is an example of a fit-up company of performers.

A fit-up is a style of theatre or circus where companies of travelling performers tour towns and villages in the provinces of Ireland, Britain and elsewhere, particularly throughout the 19th century. The term is also theatre slang to describe a stage or tent that can be transported and erected quickly for shows.

A fit-up company would be a travelling company of players which carries its scenery, props and costumes that can be set up in a temporary venue, which might be a large tent, a barn or a village hall. Fit-up companies were particularly prevalent in 19th century Ireland and a study of the performance histories of these has been made by Irish academics. The oldest of these Irish companies included the J. B. Carrickford Company and Tommy Conway/Keegan, who formed the Bohemian Minstrels in the early 19th century.

The number of fit-up companies grew at the beginning of the 20th century, with estimates of about 60 companies touring the Irish countryside by 1930. Their performances usually involved some form of variety act and a melodrama followed by a farce. While World War I made times difficult for theatres in Ireland, with conscription and travelling restrictions making it difficult for overseas performers to get to venues, the fit-up companies were able to continue largely unaffected. The company of the actor Anew McMaster formed in 1925 continued this earlier tradition and travelled to the remote parts of Ireland to perform until the middle of the 20th century. Examples in the 21st century would include travelling circuses, travelling fairs and Punch and Judy shows.

Generally, a fit-up company

carried all their props, costumes, scenery, curtains and light systems and if necessary the materials for a temporary improvised stage which they would fit-up in whatever sort of venue was available.

Theatrical companies would travel to often remote locations and fit up the local theatres or halls. Very often these travelling shows might be the only entertainment a village might see for some time and would therefore usually play to capacity audiences. They would often perform the works of classic authors such as Shakespeare. In literature the novel Nicholas Nickleby (1838) by Charles Dickens includes the Crummles troupe of travelling players that Nickleby joins. Headed by Vincent Crummles, a larger-than-life actor-manager who takes Nicholas under his wing, he and his family take their act to America to pursue greater success on the theatrical stage.
