= The Importance of Being Oscar =

1960 play by Micheál Mac Liammóir

The Importance of Being Oscar is a one man show devised by the soi-disant Irish actor Micheál Mac Liammóir and based on the writings of Oscar Wilde.

It intersperses excerpts from Wilde's plays and other writings with biographical highlights of his life. Mac Liammóir performed this show for the first time at the Gate Theatre, Dublin in 1960, took it to Broadway under the auspices of Michael Redgrave's production company with lighting design by Lee Watson, and toured with it all over the world. The show was issued on two LPs by CBS Records, and televised in Ireland by RTÉ (for which producer Chloe Gibson won a Jacob's Award), airing first on Saint Patrick's Day 1964. It was published in 1963.

Mac Liammóir adjusted his performance as new information about Wilde came to his attention; for example, he altered the accent of Wilde's gaoler when he learned that he was from Northern Ireland.

The Importance of Being Oscar was an early portrayal of Wilde as Irish, and depicts him as a "likeable charmer and a literary genius" noting but not denouncing a "curious" aspect of his character. It remained the main play about Wilde until Mac Liammóir's death in 1978.

The entertainment has since been presented by a diversity of other actors in several countries and languages. It had a West End revival in 1997 at the Savoy Theatre. In 2025 the play was presented at Jermyn Street Theatre, London.
