= Harcourt Terrace =

Street in Dublin, Ireland

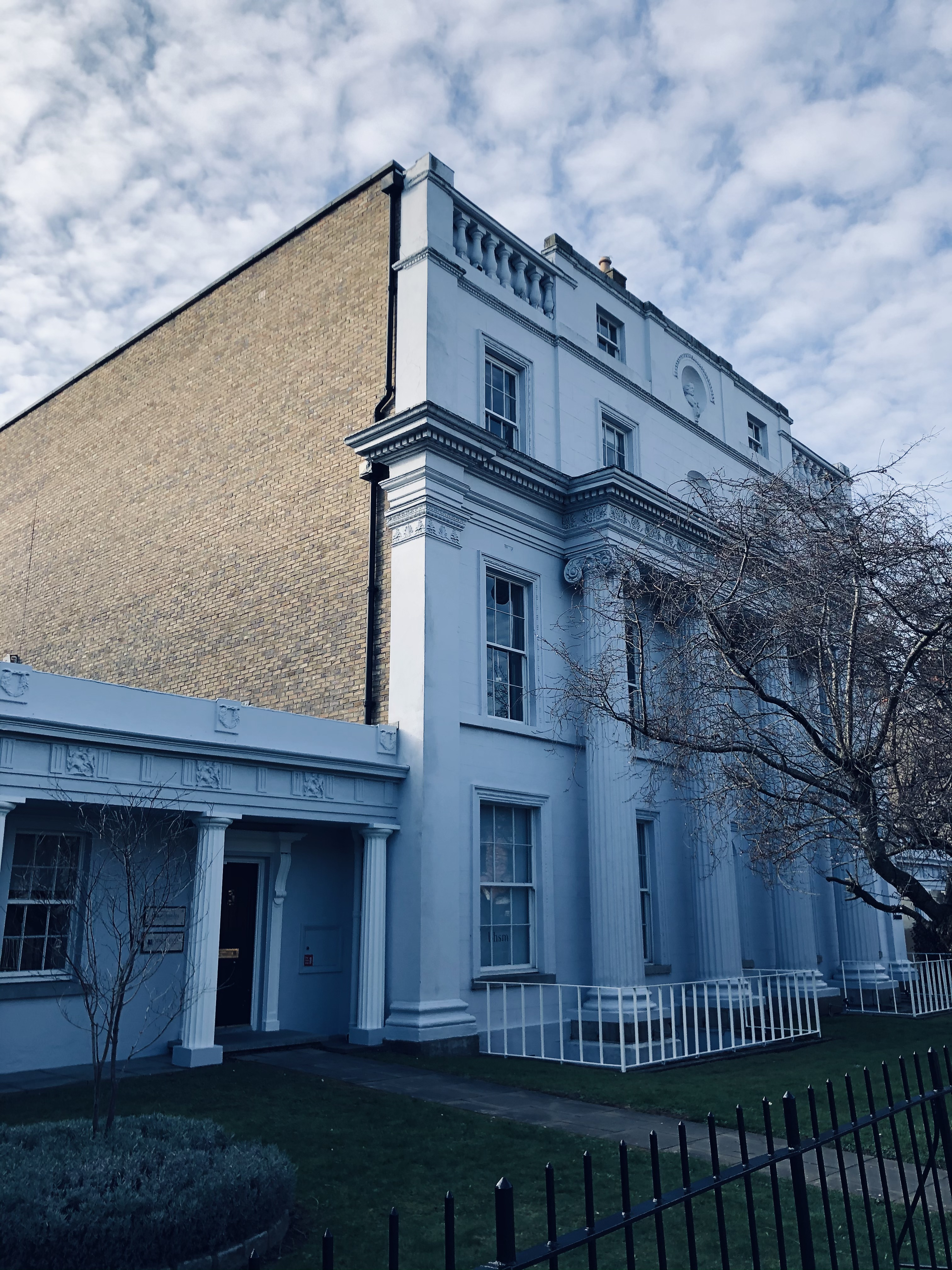
- Parthenon frieze section at a Regency-style house at 7 Harcourt Terrace

- Location within Central Dublin
- Native name: Ardán Fhearchair (Irish)
- Namesake: Simon Harcourt, 1st Earl Harcourt
- Location: Dublin, Ireland
- Postal code: D02
- Coordinates: 53.33225126175829°N 6.258087330480619°W
- north end: Charlemont Place
- south end: Adelaide Road, Harcourt Road

Harcourt Terrace (Irish: Ardán Fhearchair) is a Regency and Victorian terrace located in Dublin City, Ireland. It links the Grand Canal at Charlemont Place with Adelaide Road, near the National Concert Hall.

== History ==
The terrace first appears on maps in 1833, and is named after Simon Harcourt, 1st Earl Harcourt.

According to the National Inventory of Architectural Heritage, Harcourt Terrace, built c. 1830, is "acknowledged as Ireland's finest surviving group of Regency houses". The decoration on the terrace is based on the Parthenon marbles, an exhibit in the British Museum since 1816. The terrace was built by Charles Jaspar Joly, son of Jean Jaspar Joly, private secretary to Lord William Fitzgerald.

The building in which the current Wilder townhouse resides was built in 1878 as a nursing home for retired governesses.

Nos. 1–11 and 21–22 Harcourt Terrace are Protected Structures.

== Notable residents ==
- Michael MacLiammóir and Hilton Edwards lived in No. 4 Harcourt Terrace up until the later 1970s.
- The artist Sarah Purser had a studio in No. 11 Harcourt Terrace.
- The director of the National Library of Ireland, Thomas William Lyster lived at No. 11.

== See also ==
- List of streets and squares in Dublin
