= Anew McMaster =

British stage actor (1891–1962)

Anew McMaster in 1957

Andrew "Anew" McMaster (24 December 1891 – 24 August 1962) was a British stage actor who during his nearly 45-year acting career toured the UK, Ireland, Australia and the United States. For almost 35 years he toured as actor-manager of his own theatrical company, performing the works of Shakespeare and other playwrights.

== Early life ==
He was born as Andrew McMaster, the son of Liverpool-born Andrew McMaster (1855–1940), a Master Stevedore, and Alice Maude (née Thompson; 1865–1895). A number of sources make the erroneous claims, based on details supplied by McMaster himself, that he was born in 1893 or 1894 or even 1895 in County Monaghan in Ireland, but according to the Birth Register and the 1901 Census he was actually born in 1891 in Birkenhead, England.

Like his future brother-in-law, Micheál Mac Liammóir, who was born in London as Alfred Willmore but who claimed to have been born in Cork to Gaelic-speaking parents, McMaster reinvented himself as Irish "and claimed for himself the town of Monaghan as his birthplace, and Warrenpoint, County Down, as the scene of his earliest memories".

== Stage career ==
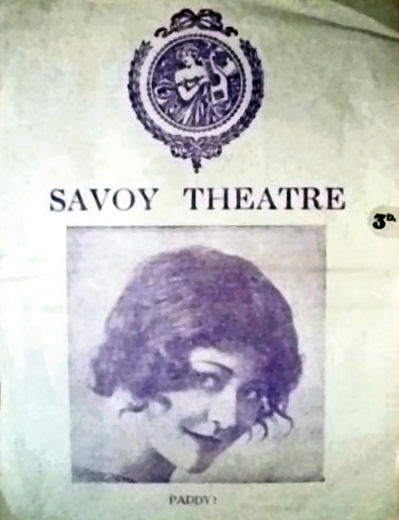
McMaster had success in Paddy the Next Best Thing at the Savoy Theatre (1920)

Aged 19, 'Mac' McMaster gave up a career in banking to pursue one on the stage. He moved to Ireland and toured that country with the O’Brien-Ireland theatrical company from 1910 to 1914. Success quickly followed with his appearance as Jack O'Hara in Paddy the Next Best Thing at the Savoy Theatre (1920). From 1921 he toured Australia in this and other plays, and in 1925 formed his own company, the McMaster Intimate Theatre Company, a 'fit-up' company to tour in the works of Shakespeare, mainly in Ireland but also in Britain and Australia; he toured with his theatrical company until 1959. One of the last actor-managers "of the old school – and an epitome of the type", on occasions McMaster would persuade a 'big name' to act with his company as a draw for audiences, and Frank Benson (1928), Sara Allgood (1929) and Mrs Patrick Campbell appeared with him.

In 1933, at the Shakespeare Memorial Theatre in Stratford-upon-Avon, he appeared as Hamlet opposite Esme Church as Gertrude, Coriolanus, Macduff in Macbeth, Leonato in Much Ado About Nothing, Prince Escalus in Romeo and Juliet, and Petruchio in The Taming of the Shrew. His greatest roles were as Othello and as Shylock in The Merchant of Venice, to which he added King Lear in 1952. Just before World War II he and his company appeared at the Chiswick Empire in a Shakespeare season. He toured the United States as James Tyrone in Eugene O'Neill's Long Day's Journey into Night in 1956. Having ‘a great organ voice’, Harold Pinter, who acted in his company in Ireland from 1951 to 1953 and called him 'Perhaps the greatest actor-manager of his time', later described McMaster as ‘evasive, proud, affectionate, shrewd, merry’. In his brief biography Mac (1968), Pinter recalled, "Mac gave about a half dozen magnificent performances of Othello while I was with him... At his best he was the finest Othello I have see. [He] stood dead in the centre of the role, and the great sweeping symphonic playing would begin, the rare tension and release within him, the arrest, the swoop, the savagery, the majesty and repose."

McMaster on tour as Othello c1959

Pinter later wrote:

I wrote ‘A Note’ in 1951, when I was touring with Anew McMaster, the Shakespearean actor-manager, throughout Southern Ireland. We presented a different play every night (seven nights a week and two matinées) and our repertoire included Hamlet, The Merchant of Venice, Julius Caesar, As You Like It, Macbeth, King Lear and Othello.
'Mac' generally took two nights off a week when the rest of the company performed plays like The Importance of Being Earnest, An Ideal Husband, Rope and An Inspector Calls but Shakespeare dominated our lives. I had in any case been obsessed with him in the preceding four years but to find myself actually performing in his plays with the extraordinary Anew McMaster was an electric experience.

Of his time touring with McMaster in 1957 the actor Henry Woolf later recalled:

[McMaster] had a very strict rule for employment – he hired whoever would accept the least money. So the quality of the company was, how shall we say, uneven... We did eight different Shakespeare plays a week, and then on Sundays, we’d put on a murder mystery or a romance or something... He had a superb voice, and very tall striking figure, and he didn’t have any inhibitions. He acted as if it was the most natural thing in the world for someone to act. It wasn’t ham; it wasn’t melodrama. If there was a height to be scaled, he would do it. He didn’t know much about the ‘Method’, or all these dogmas; he was a natural man, who felt things, very strongly. Little did I realise I was taking part in something that would disappear for ever. It was a wonderful thing, a missionary thing, bringing great plays to fairly remote areas.

McMaster's only film role was an uncredited appearance as the Judge in Sword of Sherwood Forest (1960).

== Personal life ==
In 1924 McMaster married the actress and designer Marjorie Willmore (1894–1970), the sister of Micheál Mac Liammóir. They had two children, the actors John Christopher McMaster (1925–1995) and Mary-Rose McMaster (1926–2018).

Anew McMaster died aged 70 at his home in Dublin, Ireland in 1962.

== Legacy ==
McMaster trained a generation of actors who toured with his company and went on to achieve success as actors. These included: Pauline Flanagan, Milo O'Shea, T. P. McKenna, Kenneth Haigh, Henry Woolf, Harold Pinter, Donal Donnelly and Patrick Magee. It was while they were touring with McMaster's company that the actor and dramatist Micheál Mac Liammóir and the actor and producer Hilton Edwards first met and began their lifelong partnership.

His biography, A Life Remembered: A Memoir of Anew McMaster by his daughter Mary-Rose McMaster, was published in 2017. Harold Pinter also published a short biography, Mac, in 1968.
