= The Factory Girls =

Play by Frank McGuinness

The Factory Girls is a play by Frank McGuinness.

The play is about five women whose jobs at a County Donegal, Ireland, shirt factory are under threat. It features only two male characters, and these only appear in two scenes.

The Factory Girls was first performed at the Abbey Theatre in 1982 and was the play that brought McGuinness to prominence.

== Characters ==
- Ellen, in her fifties
- Rebecca, in her late twenties
- Rosemary, sixteen
- Una, in her sixties
- Vera, in her early thirties
- Bonner, in his forties
- Rohan, in his late twenties

== Synopsis ==
On a Wednesday morning, four factory women gossip about their coworker Rosemary's consistent tardiness, as well as the poor working conditions at the factory. At lunchtime that day, they bully Rosemary about her hair loss. Ellen says the only possible solution is to wash her hair in the urine of an old maid. One of the other women, Vera, informs Ellen that the factory foreman, Rohan, has requested Ellen in his office. When Ellen returns, she reveals that union negotiations are about to begin the next day.

At the meeting the next morning, Rohan dives into declaring the factory's problems. When he declares he needs a dozen shirts in thirteen minutes, the women explode in disgust and outrage. Rohan and union leader Bonner allow the women to leave, after which they discuss the issues at hand. Bonner offers a bit of advice on how to deal with the women and leaves Rohan to his factory. The scene closes with Rohan floundering while considering his options.

In the days that follow, Vera and Ellen lead a takeover of the office, blockading themselves inside the factory. Despite Rohan's best efforts to negotiate with them, the women refuse to open the door or continue discussion. They stay there through the weekend, calling their families and arranging for a Mass to be said. The priest, Father Mitchell, tells them to go home and be thankful they have jobs at all.

The next morning, the women are awakened by a telephone call with no one on the other end. This pattern of the phone ringing with no one answering is repeated. The women become frantic with possibilities of who could be on the other end. Rebecca reprimands Vera for wanting to return to her man and addressing Ellen's control of the other women. Rebecca closes the door and the play ends on an uncertain note.
