= Micheál Mac Liammóir =

20th-century Irish actor, playwright, writer, and artist

- Mac Liammóir in The Importance of Being Oscar
- Born: Alfred Lee Willmore; 25 October 1899; Willesden, Middlesex, England
- Died: 6 March 1978 (aged 78); Dublin, Ireland
- Occupations: Actor, author, playwright, painter, poet, impresario
- Known for: Co-founding the Gate Theatre
- Partner: Hilton Edwards

Micheál Mac Liammóir (born Alfred Lee Willmore; 25 October 1899 – 6 March 1978) was an actor, designer, dramatist, writer, and impresario in 20th-century Ireland.

With his partner, Hilton Edwards, and two others, Mac Liammóir founded the Gate Theatre in Dublin, and became one of the most recognisable figures in the arts in twentieth-century Ireland. As well as acting at the Gate and internationally, he designed numerous productions, wrote eleven plays, and published stories, verse and travel books in Irish and English. He wrote and appeared in three one-man shows, of which The Importance of Being Oscar (1960) was the most celebrated, achieving more than 1,300 performances.

Born in London to an English family with no Irish connections, he emigrated to Ireland in early adulthood, changed his name, invented an Irish ancestry, and remained there for the rest of his life. His fabricated identity as a native Irishman was not exposed until many years after his death.

== Life and career ==
=== Early years ===
As King Goldfish, 1911

Mac Liammóir was born Alfred Lee Willmore, in Willesden, in north-west London, into a family with no Irish connections. He was the youngest child and only son of Alfred George Willmore (1863–1934), a forage buyer for the firm of Whitney's of Bayswater, and his wife, Mary, née Lee (1867–1918). (Note: In Mac Liammóir's fabricated version of his origins his father was "Alfred Anthony MacLiammóir".)

He attended primary school in Willesden and then attended a children's theatre academy run by Lila Field. He became a professional actor at the age of twelve; his sister Marjorie took charge of his general education and was his chaperone on tours that included visits to venues in Ireland as well as Britain. He made his debut in 1911, as King Goldfish in Field's play The Goldfish, alongside another child actor, Noël Coward. He later said, "I learned from Lila Field the absolute ABC of getting on and off the stage without disgracing oneself; I learned what a cue meant, what a stick of greasepaint was, the elements of timing, and that ghastly thing, the exploitation of childish charm". In September of that year he first worked for Sir Herbert Tree, playing Macduff's son in Macbeth. From Tree he quickly learned "a rude lesson" that charm was not enough: "I think it was Tree who first awoke the actor's imagination in me and made me feel the terror of the Witches' Coven and the horror of the ghost-haunted banquet".

Drawing by the teenage Mac Liammóir, printed in Punch in 1917

In the Christmas season of 1911, he played Michael Darling in Peter Pan, and in June 1912, he played Oliver Twist in Tree's revival of the stage version of the novel. After two further child roles, and appearances in four silent films (now lost) he temporarily abandoned acting. After a summer in Spain, visiting his grandparents and becoming fluent in Spanish, he studied painting at Willesden Polytechnic and then the Slade School of Art in 1915–16.

With a fellow student, Mary O'Keefe, he attended Irish language classes at the Ludgate Circus branch of the Gaelic League; the biographer Christopher Fitz-Simon thinks it probable that they saw plays by W. B. Yeats, Lady Gregory and J. M. Synge during the visits of the Abbey Theatre company in this period. (Note: Under the title "The Irish Players", a company from the Abbey played at the Little Theatre in 1915, giving plays by Synge and Lady Gregory, and gave Duty, a comedy about law-breaking by Irish policemen, in the music-hall bill at the London Coliseum.) Both students developed a keen interest in the Irish Literary Revival.

=== Move to Ireland ===
Mac Liammóir, now calling himself "Michael Willmore", made a brief return to the stage in February 1917, in Felix Gets a Month, a "whimsical comedy" at the Haymarket Theatre. The following month he went with O'Keefe and her mother to Ireland, the former having contracted tuberculosis and been prescribed "fresh air", the latter anxious to escape Zeppelin raids. Fitz-Simon suggests that Mac Liammóir's motive was to escape conscription into the army in the latter stages of the First World War.

In Ireland Mac Liammóir earned a modest living as a freelance illustrator for newspapers and books, acted from time to time, and designed for the Irish Theatre and Dublin Drama League. He assimilated himself into Irish culture and politics. He campaigned for Sinn Féin in the 1918 General Election, published his first book, a collection of stories in Irish, in 1922, and continued to write verse and prose in Irish and English. He experimented with various gaelicised versions of his name, including "Mac Uaimmhóir" and "Mac Liaimmhóir". He built up a fictitious identity as a native Irishman born in Cork.

During most of the 1920s Mac Liammóir continued to live with the O'Keefes. In search of a healthy environment for Mary, they moved between Switzerland and the French Riviera. He exhibited successfully in local galleries and, in 1923, at the Leigh Gallery in London. He later wrote a book of recollections – in Irish – about his travels. In 1925 he starred in a silent film, Land of Her Fathers, with a cast of mainly Abbey Theatre players.

Mary O'Keefe died in 1927. Mac Liammóir, now known by that name, returned to the theatre. His sister Marjorie had married the actor-manager Anew McMaster whose touring company Mac Liammóir joined, playing Shakespearean roles including Bassanio in The Merchant of Venice, Laertes in Hamlet and Cassio in Othello. While on tour in the south of Ireland, he met another young English actor, Hilton Edwards, who was to become his lifelong partner, both personal and professional. Mac Liammóir and Edwards decided to settle in Dublin, with the intention of setting up their own theatre there.

=== Gate Theatre ===
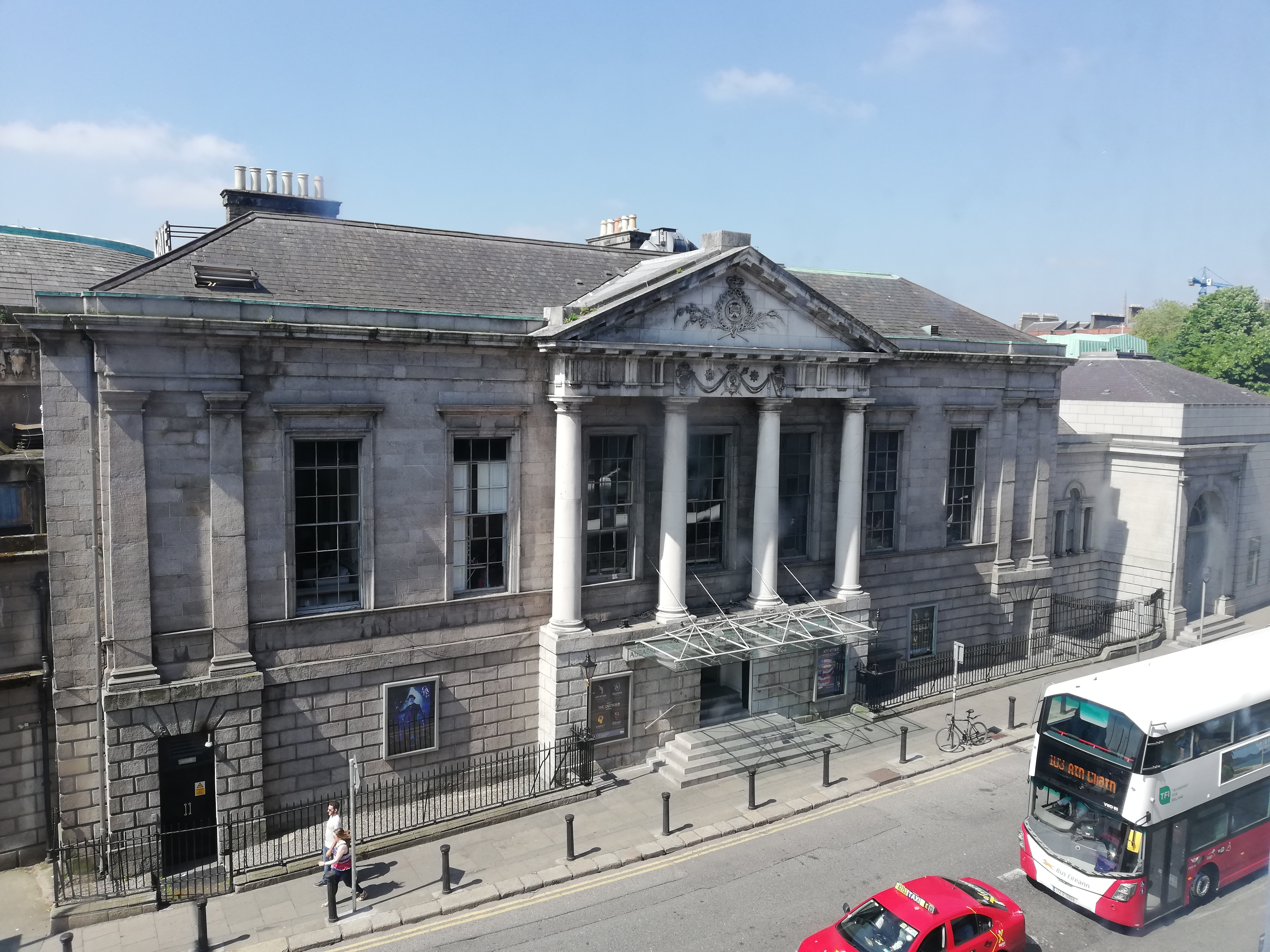
Gate Theatre, Dublin (2018 photograph)

In 1928 Mac Liammóir wrote, directed, designed and starred in Diarmuid and Gráinne for the opening of the Irish language theatre, An Taibhdhearc, in Galway. He subsequently produced twenty plays there.

Also in 1928, Mac Liammóir was one of the four founders of the Gate Theatre Studio, later simply the Gate Theatre, alongside Hilton Edwards, Daisy Bannard Cogley, and Gearóid Ó Lochlainn. Mac Liammóir and Edwards had been considering theatrical plans for Dublin, while Bannard Cogley (a friend of Mac Liammóir) and Ó Lochlainn had been discussing finding a more permanent theatre space, and they met, along with some mutual friends, in Bannard Cogley's club at 7 Harcourt Street, in spring 1928. After further meetings, the quartet rented the Peacock Theatre and launched the Gate Theatre Studio there on 14 October 1928. The theatre studio spent its early years at the 102-seat Peacock Theatre and opened with a production of Peer Gynt, and Mac Liammóir subsequently acted in and designed nearly 300 productions at the Peacock and, after the company gained its own home in 1930, on Cavendish Row, at the Gate. He appeared in a wide range of plays, from Shakespeare (Romeo and Othello) to Ibsen (Oswald in Ghosts and the title role in Brand) and Eugene O'Neill (Orin in Mourning Becomes Electra), as well as lighter pieces. Over the next fifty years the Gate Theatre company presented a programme of new or experimental plays by Wilde, Shaw, Coward and many others. Mac Liammóir and Edwards fostered the careers of new Irish dramatists such as Denis Johnston and rising young actors including Orson Welles. (Note: Welles was with the Gate company from October 1931 to February 1932, appearing in supporting roles in six productions.)

Mac Liammóir returned to the West End in 1935, with the Gate company. The theatrical paper The Era rated his Hamlet one of the best in recent years: "charged with force, intelligence, humanity and dramatic certainty … a dominating and moving piece of acting", and said that the Gate company "looks like putting the Abbey in the shade". The cosmopolitan atmosphere of Mac Liammóir and Edwards' Gate Theatre was contrasted with the earnest Celticism of the Abbey, and the two Dublin theatres were affectionately dubbed "Sodom and Begorrah".

=== Wartime and later years ===
Mac Liammóir remained based in Ireland during the Second World War. In the post-war years, he returned to the West End in his own play Ill Met by Moonlight. The Stage thought the piece "too obscure and too discursive", but praised the performances of Mac Liammóir, Edwards and their supporting cast. The following year the company played a short season on Broadway – Mac Liammóir's début there – giving his Where Stars Walk, Johnston's The Old Lady Says No!, and Shaw's John Bull's Other Island. In 1951 he played Iago to Welles's Othello in the latter's film adaptation. In his early fifties, he was unusually old for the role, but Welles wanted Iago played as an older, impotent man consumed by envy of the younger Othello. Mac Liammóir returned to the role onstage at the Dublin Festival in 1962 opposite William Marshall in the title role. (Note: Marshall was a last-minute replacement for Anew McMaster, who died shortly before the production.)

In 1954 Mac Liammóir returned to London, playing Brack in Hedda Gabler with Peggy Ashcroft as Hedda. In the role he was judged to be both sinister and amusing. Most of his work continued to be at the Gate, but in 1959 he returned to New York to play Don Pedro in Much Ado About Nothing, with John Gielgud as Benedick and Margaret Leighton as Beatrice.

Mac Liammóir's biggest theatrical success came in 1960, with his one-man show The Importance of Being Oscar, which won enthusiastic reviews and did well at the box office. It opened at the Gate, after which he played it on Broadway, in London and on tour around the world. He appeared in the piece more than 1,300 times between 1960 and 1975. He followed this in May 1963 with a new one-man entertainment I Must Be Talking to My Friends, and in 1970 presented a third, Talking About Yeats. Also in 1963 he had a key role as the ironic, mocking, unseen narrator of the multi-Oscar-winning film Tom Jones.

Despite Ireland's anti-gay laws, not repealed in their lifetimes, Edwards' and Mac Liammóir's relationship gained wide acceptance. (Note: In a possibly apocryphal tale, Mac Liammóir was said to have been arrested on an indecency charge, but acquitted when his landlady attested to the purity of his morals: "He's never once tried to take a young lady up to his room".) The writer Éibhear Walshe has described them as Ireland's only publicly acknowledged homosexuals. They were jointly created freemen of the city of Dublin in 1973, the first theatre people to be thus honoured. Before that, Mac Liammóir had received the Lady Gregory Medal for literature in 1960 and an honorary doctorate from Trinity College in 1963. In 1973, France made him a Chevalier of the Légion d'honneur.

Mac Liammóir made his final stage performance at the Gate in 1975 in The Importance of Being Oscar. He died at his and Edwards' Dublin home, 4 Harcourt Terrace, on 6 March 1978. Walshe records, "as a measure of the public acceptance of the MacLiammóir–Edwards partnership, the president of Ireland attended Micheál's funeral, two days later, at St Fintan's, Howth, Dublin, and paid his respects to Hilton Edwards as chief mourner".

Mac Liammóir continued to give the false impression that he was native Irish throughout his life, including as late as 1976 reminiscing in an interview about how he "first went to [London]" as a child, how as a young man he "would get back to Ireland as soon as [he] could" and that he was originally from Cork. For many years after his death, reference books continued to record him inaccurately as a native of Cork. (Note: See, for instance, The Macmillan Dictionary of Irish Literature (2016), p. 411.)

== Works ==
=== Plays ===
In his Who's Who in the Theatre entry, Mac Liammóir listed ten plays of which he was the author, as well as the three one-man shows, and an unspecified number of adaptations ("Jane Eyre, The Picture of Dorian Grey, A Tale of Two Cities, etc.")

- Ford of the Hurdles (1928)
- Diarmuid agus Gráinne (1929)
- Where Stars Walk (1940)
- Dancing Shadows (1941)
- Ill Met by Moonlight (1946)
- Portrait of Miriam (1947)
- The Mountains Look Different (1948)
- Home for Christmas (1950)
- A Slipper for the Moon (1954)
- Saint Patrick (1955)

One-man shows:
- The Importance of Being Oscar
- I Must Be Talking to My Friends (issued as an LP (Argo RG493))
- Talking About Yeats

=== Books ===
- Put Money in Thy Purse
- Each Actor on His Ass
- Ceo Meala Lá Seaca
- Enter a Goldfish
- All for Hecuba
- Oícheanna Sidhe
- Lá agus Oíche
- Aisteoirí Faoi Dhá Sholas
- Theatre in Ireland
- Ireland
- Bláth agus Taibhse
- An Oscar of No Importance
- W.B. Yeats and His World, with Eavan Boland

=== Films ===
The British Film Institute lists eleven films in which Mac Liammóir took part.

- Henry VIII (Page) (1911)
- Enoch Arden (1914)
- The Little Minister (Micah Dow) (1915)
- Comin' Thro' the Rye (1916)
- Land of Her Fathers (1924)
- Hamlet at Elsinore (1951)
- Othello (Iago) (1951)
- Tom Jones (Narrator) (1963)
- 30 Is a Dangerous Age, Cynthia (Irish storyteller) (1968)
- The Kremlin Letter (Sweet Alice) (1970)
- What's the Matter with Helen? (Hamilton Starr) (1971)

=== Ballet scenarios ===
An Cóitín Dearg (The Red Petticoat), choreography by Joan Denise Moriarty, music by Aloys Fleischmann, costume and set designs by MacLiammóir, first performed in May 1951 in Cork by the Cork Ballet Company, accompanied by the Cork Symphony Orchestra.

The Enchanted Stream, based on the poem by W.B. Yeats 'Song of Wandering Aengus', choreography by Anton Dolin, music Rondes de Printemps by Debussy, décor by Edward Delany, first performed by the London Festival Ballet, accompanied by the London Philharmonic Orchestra, at the Dublin International Theatre Festival of 1959.

Full Moon for the Bride, choreography by Joan Denise Moriarty, music by A. J. Potter, costume and set designs by MacLiammóir, first performed in Cork and then in Dublin's Gaiety Theatre in November 1974 by the Cork Ballet Company, accompanied by the Cork Symphony Orchestra, conducted by Aloys Fleischmann.

== Biographies ==
Books about Mac Liammóir include Micheál Mac Liammóir: Designs & Illustrations 1917–1972, by Richard Pine and Orla Murphy (1973); Enter Certain Players: Edwards–MacLiammoir and the Gate 1928–1978, edited by Peter Luke (1978); a biography, The Importance of Being Micheál by Micheál Ó hAodha (1990) and The Boys: A Double Biography, by Christopher Fitz-Simon (1996).

In 1985, Orson Welles was the narrator for Two People... With One Pulse, a documentary film about Mac Liammoir and Edwards. To mark Mac Liammóir's centenary in 1999 the BBC commissioned a documentary, Dear Boy: The Story of Michéal Mac Liammóir, which included rare archive footage.

Mac Liammóir is the subject of the 1990 play The Importance of Being Micheál by John Keyes; Frank McGuinness's play 2008 Gates of Gold is inspired by Edwards and Mac Liammóir; and Mac Liammóir is the subject of Antoine Ó Flatharta's 2023 play Wáltsáil Abhaile.

== Commemorations ==
The annual Dublin Gay Theatre Festival presents the "Michéal Mac Liammóir Award for Outstanding Performance by a Male".

== Notes, references and sources ==
=== Sources ===
- Castle, Charles (1972). Noël. London: W H Allen. ISBN 978-1-34-907795-3.
- Herbert, Ian, ed. (1977). Who's Who in the Theatre (sixteenth ed.). London and Detroit: Pitman Publishing and Gale Research. ISBN 978-0-273-00163-8.
- Hogan, Robert (2016). The Macmillan Dictionary of Irish Literature. London: Macmillan. ISBN 978-0-491-00534-0.
- Mac Liammóir, Micheál (1952). Put Money in Thy Purse: The Diary of the Film "Othello". London: Methuen. OCLC 786105342.
- Morley, Sheridan (2006). Theatre's Strangest Acts: Extraordinary But True Tales from the History of Theatre. London: Robson. ISBN 978-1-86-105674-0.
- Parker, John, ed. (1939). Who's Who in the Theatre (ninth ed.). London: Sir Isaac Pitman and Sons. OCLC 1036973910.
- Taylor, John Russell (1998). Orson Welles: A Celebration. London: Pavilion. ISBN 978-1-86-205127-0.
- Vaněk, Joe (2005). Scene Change: One Hundred Years of Theatre Design at the Abbey Theatre. Dublin: Irish Museum of Modern Art. ISBN 978-1-90-381139-9.
- Wallace, Martin (1983). 100 Irish Lives. Newton Abbot: David & Charles. ISBN 978-0-38-920364-3.

Academic articles on Mac Liammóir available in open access regime

- Markus, Radvan. "Micheál mac Liammóir, the Irish Language, and the Idea of Freedom." Marguérite Corporaal and Ruud van den Beuken, eds. A Stage of Emancipation: Change and Progress at the Dublin Gate Theatre. Liverpool: Liverpool University Press, 2021, 113–131.
- Dean, Joan Fitzpatrick, and Radvan Markus. "The Internationalist Dramaturgy of Hilton Edwards and Micheál mac Liammóir." Ondřej Pilný, Ruud van den Beuken, Ian R. Walsh, eds. Cultural Convergences: The Dublin Gate Theatre, 1928–1960. London: Palgrave Macmillan, 2021, 15–46.
