= Frank McGuinness =

Irish writer (born 1953)

- Born: 29 July 1953 (age 73); Buncrana, County Donegal, Ireland
- Occupations: Playwright, poet, translator
- Writing career
- Genres: Drama, Poetry
- Notable works: The Factory Girls, Observe the Sons of Ulster Marching Towards the Somme, Someone Who'll Watch Over Me, Dolly West's Kitchen

Professor Frank McGuinness (born 1953) is an Irish writer. As well as his own plays, which include The Factory Girls, Observe the Sons of Ulster Marching Towards the Somme, Someone Who'll Watch Over Me and Dolly West's Kitchen, he is recognised for a "strong record of adapting literary classics, having translated the plays of Racine, Sophocles, Ibsen, Garcia Lorca, and Strindberg to critical acclaim". He has also published six collections of poetry, and two novels. McGuinness was Professor of Creative Writing at University College Dublin (UCD) from 2007 to 2018.

== Biography ==
McGuinness was born in Buncrana, a town located on the Inishowen Peninsula of County Donegal, Ireland. He was educated locally and at University College Dublin, where he studied Pure English and medieval studies to postgraduate level.

He first came to prominence with his play The Factory Girls, but established his reputation with his play about World War I, Observe the Sons of Ulster Marching Towards the Somme, which was staged in Dublin's Abbey Theatre and internationally. The play made a name for him when it was performed at Hampstead Theatre, drawing comments about McGuinness's Irish Catholic background. It won numerous awards including the London Evening Standard Award for Most Promising Playwright for McGuinness and the Christopher Ewart-Biggs Memorial Prize. He has also written new versions of classic dramas, including works by Henrik Ibsen, Anton Chekhov, and Euripides, adapting the literal translations of others. In addition, he wrote the screenplay for the film Dancing at Lughnasa, adapting the stage play by fellow Ulsterman Brian Friel.

McGuinness's first poetry anthology, Booterstown, was published in 1994. Several of his poems have been recorded by Marianne Faithfull, including Electra, After the Ceasefire and The Wedding.

McGuinness previously lectured in Linguistics and Drama at the University of Ulster, Medieval Studies at University College, Dublin and English at the National University of Ireland, Maynooth. Then he was a writer-in-residence lecturing at University College Dublin before being appointed Professor of Creative Writing in the School of English, Drama and Film there.

== Original plays ==
Frank McGuinness has explained, "My earliest writing was … song lyrics. I would have loved to have been … Paul McCartney … Joni Mitchell". Desiring to write something "substantial", however, he "tossed a coin" between a play and a novel, and decided to write a play. The Glass God, a one-act play written by McGuinness for the company Platform Group Theatre, was premiered at the Lourdes Hall Theatre in Dublin in 1982. It was one of three one-act plays presented under the collective title of Shrapnel.

McGuinness' first full-length play, The Factory Girls, also premiered in 1982, and dealt with a group of female workers facing redundancy from a small town in Donegal. McGuinness explained that he was inspired by "the women in my family". A critic has highlighted its "Wednesday to Sunday time frame", in a link to Catholic imagery which, surprisingly given its theme, indicates that this is in fact "a passion play". "When I wrote 'The Factory Girls'," McGuiness has explained, "I desperately wanted to bring across the audience a sense that I came from a sophisticated background, [because] I come from a background where language is very dangerous, where language is very layered."

McGuinness' second play, Observe the Sons of Ulster Marching towards the Somme, was first staged in 1985. The play, about a group of Protestant soldiers in the First World War, was not primarily political in intent, but, according to the playwright, was originally inspired by "a great story". Observe the Sons of Ulster has been described as "a theater of ghosts", a play where "a community is figured as spectral".

The play which followed, Innocence, dealt with the painter Caravaggio. It took its name from one of his paintings, The Sacrifice of Isaak, about the Biblical story of the father whose faith is tested by God's request that he kill his son. In the painting, a sheep watches the sacrifice about to take place and looks appalled at human cruelty, its innocence shattered. McGuinness was inspired by "this innocent sheep" who, at the end of the story, will be sacrificed instead of the child. "Only Caravaggio would remember the sheep" in the story, McGuinness says.

His next play, Carthaginians, premiered in 1989, was concerned with the Bloody Sunday events in Northern Ireland. In 1972, in Derry, British soldiers shot unarmed civilians who were taking part in a march against internment and killed 14 people. McGuinness has described Carthaginians as "My play on the Catholic imagination …", stating that "the keyword in [the play] is the word 'perhaps'". It has been claimed that Carthaginians should be placed primarily "within a body of translations and adaptations of ancient Greek tragedy in the Irish theatre of the 1980s and 1990s". A number of critics have suggested that Ibsen is the main influence in the plays of McGuinness, something corroborated by the writer himself, who has also explained that "... there is of course another influence, that of Shakespeare...". It was this influence that triggered the composition of Carthaginians and "Observe the Sons of Ulster Marching towards the Somme". In the author's own words: "I decided, right, let's grab the unicorn by the horn, and see what happens". McGuinness has declared that he had "wanted to construct a five-act Shakespearean play", and to use "narrative in a way that I hope no one had done before". He has described the play as "a big brute", adding that, among his works to date, "I suspect 'this play will last'".

Someone Who'll Watch Over Me, first staged in 1992, is a play about the 1986 Lebanon hostage crisis. It is in effect a tragi-comedy which explores the relationship between three hostages, one American, one Irish and one English. Despite their contrasting backgrounds and beliefs the play soon erodes away their differences and brings to the fore the shared humanity that they rely on in order to cope with the horrors and uncertainties of their incarceration. In his introduction to Frank McGuinness: Plays 2 (a collection of plays which included Mary and Lizzie, Someone Who'll Watch Over Me, Dolly West's Kitchen and The Bird Sanctuary) McGuinness explains, "At their hearts' core these plays centre around rituals and the need to disrupt ritual. […] In their tee-total captivity, Edward, Michael and Adam throw a wild party, somehow knowing that it's a wake. After these engagements, nothing will be the same. Comedy thrives on change. I suppose these plays are about change. Are they comedies? When they want to be."

The play Dolly West's Kitchen, premiered in 1999, is set during the Second World War in Buncrana. This time was euphemistically referred to in the Republic of Ireland as "The Emergency". McGuinness has explained that the arrival of US troops into the town of Buncrana was not only an invasion in terms of the military presence, but also an "invasion of sexuality", as the soldiers made quite an impression in the town. But the main theme in the play "… was to do with a gigantic sorrow in my life, which is that my mother died". This was the heart of the story, because, McGuinness explained, when the mother dies, "the children have to grow up".

The play Gates of Gold, premiered in 2002, was commissioned by The Gate Theatre in Dublin to celebrate its anniversary. The theatre was founded by Micheál Mac Liammóir and Hilton Edwards, who were lifelong partners in life and work, and the play is about them. McGuinness, who is himself gay and whose plays often contain gay relationships or explore more traditional family drama from an outsider's perspective, has explained that he "wanted to write a play that was a great celebration of homosexual marriage, love, partnership". The playwright has a drawing of MacLiammoir, by Norah McGuinness, in his sitting room, a work "which I bought with the royalties of the Factory Girls", so the actor is literally a constant presence in McGuinness' life. Gates of Gold looks at the dying days of MacLiammoir, because McGuinness wanted to write "something darker and stranger", and less predictable, about these two pioneers of theatre.

Premiered in 2007, There Came a Gipsy Riding asks the question of "how do you survive the greatest loss, the loss of a child...", to conclude that "you don't recover, but you do learn to live with it". A critic summarised this "impressive drama" as "a concentrated piece that intricately dissects a middle-class family at war with itself following the suicide of one of their three children".

The play The Hanging Gardens, premiered in 2007, is concerned with Alzheimer's disease, and the devastating effect it has on its sufferers and the people around them. McGuinness explained that: "I hope the audience laughs. And that they're shocked. I try to give them something more than they expect." One reviewer declared that the play "holds us, moves us, alarms us."

== Adaptation ==
McGuinness is as well known for his play adaptations as for his original plays. He has adapted classics by Sophocles, Jean Racine, Henrik Ibsen, Molière, Valle-Inclan, Federico García Lorca, as well as short works by Strindberg and Pirandello, a short story by James Joyce, and novels by Stoker and Du Maurier. His ability to distil the raw force from classic Greek drama, in particular, has been noted by critics. He sometimes takes noticeable liberties in his adaptations, in order to strengthen characterisation—for example by making the alienated protagonist of Rebecca into an Anglo-Irish woman from a once privileged family—or to underline the theme of the play—for example in Rebecca "I've invented a scene in which Mrs Danvers confronts Max and says, 'You loved her, but she didn't love you'", or in Barbaric Comedies, a play about a world of amoral grotesquerie, he added a sexual assault scene. Some of these liberties have been controversial. By and large, McGuinness' adaptations have been hailed as reworkings that "breath[e] life" into the originals.

== Poetry ==
Frank McGuinness began his writing career as a poet. As a university student, he has explained, "I sent some poems to the 'Irish Press' and the wonderful [general editor] David Marcus wrote back to me saying [']I'm going to publish them['], and 'You are a writer'. He didn't know what he was unleashing but that was the beginning really. A terrific thing to say when you're 20 or 21. And I went from there". 'Booterstown' (1994), is rooted in the town of the same name; 'The Stone Jug' (2003) is a sequence of sixty sonnets; 'Dulse' (2008), takes its name from a Latin word meaning 'sweet', which is also the name of an edible seaweed used in Ireland. Broadly, McGuinness poetic style is characterised by the use of clear solid unrhymed lines designed to echo in the mind of the listener or reader. The poems often seek to organise emotion, and sometimes represent probing psychological sketches. They are concerned with relationships, events, and the significance of the everyday. The poems are snapshots, often inspired by personal experience, but sometimes created to supplement or assist in delineating fictional characters for his plays. One critic has claimed that McGuinness's poetic work is characterised by its "reliance on dramatic monologue and on intense lyricism". The Memorial Garden at University College Dublin, designed in a circular shape, features a carved stone with a short poem written by Frank McGuinness for the site: "This silence is round / So is remembrance, / they say".

== Fiction ==
Frank McGuinness' first novel, Arimathea, was published in 2013. It has been described as "[a] story of salvation". The book is set in a village in Donegal in 1950, registering the effect of the arrival of an Italian painter who "came from out foreign and … spoke wild funny". The story, told from the point of view of various characters, is inspired by a historic Italian artist who was commissioned to paint the Stations of the Cross in the catholic church of Buncrana in the 1900s. McGuinness wrote the book as research for his play The Hanging Gardens, but never thought it would be published as a novel. The story of the play deals with a novelist who contracts Alzheimer's disease, and progressively loses control of his mind; in order to understand the character better, McGuinness decided to try to write a novel that that man could have written, and the result was Arimathea. In addition to this piece of work, McGuinness also conducted other research for the play, by interviewing people with experience of elderly parents being affected by Alzheimer's disease. While one reviewer claimed that "there is nothing like [this novel] in the history of Irish fiction", another stated that Arimathea is "a distinctively Irish book, and one in which echoes of Joyce vie with those of Máirtín Ó Cadhain". Many commentators pointed out that this choral novel, told in a series of monologues, makes good use of Frank McGuinness' experience in the theatre, including his ability to render individualised voices. His background as a poet may also have been relevant to Arimathea's investment in suggestion as a method and silence as an idea. "[T]he final effect" of the novel, as one reviewer put it, "is to lead the reader to consider those voices not yet heard, and the private agonies that are never shared".

Frank McGuinness' second novel, The Woodcutter and His Family, published in September 2017, deals with the last days of James Joyce in Zurich. The novel is made of four sections, monologues from James, his partner Nora, their daughter Lucia, and son Giorgio, who are given the names of characters from Joyce's play Exiles. At the book launch, Joycean scholar professor Anne Fogarty spoke of her surprise at opening the book to meet the voice of Giorgio Joyce, a figure neglected by Joycean scholars. Fogarty said that McGuinness' novel has "liberated" the Joyce family from historiographers and biographers, and described the book as "wise and witty". At the launch, Frank McGuinness explained that he fell under the spell of Joyce as a young man, when he heard Joni Mitchel read out the opening one and a half pages from the novel 'Portrait of the Artist'. McGuinness also said that he was aware, in taking on the project of a novel about the Joyces, that he was "putting my head into a zoo-worth of lions' mouths", but that this would not stop him. The Woodcutter and His Family is notable also because it deliberately changes historical facts. While focusing on the Joyce family, the book also includes a portrait of the Irish playwright Samuel Beckett, a friend of the Joyces.

== Short fiction ==
McGuinness has published a number of short stories. The short story "Paprika", from 2014, appeared in a collection of new stories by Irish writers. "Paprika" is a tale of murder, centered on a disgruntled, mentally unstable operatic white tenor, who is currently playing the role of Othello in an opera, wearing blackface. The story is told through "the pompous voice" of the protagonist, "who veers between grandiosity and despair". Structured as a fluid but self-conscious monologue, the piece has various levels of association, including a subversion ─or an update─ of the plot of Shakespeare's play Othello, an investigation on the performance of identity, and a dissection of the 'logic' of inequality, and employing "[t]he shards of childhood", to "pierce the narrative in an unusual and thought-provoking [way]."

In 2018, McGuinness published his first collection of short fiction, Paprika, consisting of twelve stories. It is published by Brandon, an imprint of The O'Brien Press in Dublin. The stories have been described as "uproarious and outrageous, [tending] to depict insecure, unhinged individuals who find themselves on the wrong side of a comfortable life. A startling collection"

== Opera ==
Frank McGuinness's first opera libretto was Thebans, produced in 2014 at the English National Opera in London. The opera is a version of the trilogy of plays by Sophocles. He was invited to write the libretto by composer Julian Anderson. Adapting this substantial body of work onto a single story 100 minutes long was a considerable challenge. Recalling his initial conversations with the composer, McGuinness explained: "The first thing I said was: I know it will have to be much, much shorter. We looked at a two-page speech. "I can get this down to six lines," I told him – and then did just that." The Theban trilogy, comprising Oedipus Rex, Oedipus at Colonus, and Antigone, has been occasionally performed as a chronologically ordered, three-play show. For his version, McGuinness made the decision to change the traditional order in the story. He explained that "I've always thought that putting [the play Antigone] at the end of the evening short-changes it remarkably. Although it's the final part of the trilogy, it never feels like the end; in fact, it almost feels as if it were by a different writer." While some critics did not approve of the switch, they still described the opera as "distinctly impressive".

McGuinness' priority in producing the libretto was to make the original text accessible to a contemporary audience. "I'm trying to make this accessible", McGuinness declared, "and to write as beautiful a text as I can for the singers to sing. And that is what I think they are, these stories that have haunted us: they are something beautiful, something brutal, and the beauty and brutality confound each other." The original trilogy is "revered as a foundational document of western civilisation", and one of the main achievements of this "dazzling new opera", a reviewer pointed out, was that "it blows apart this crippling reverence and presents the drama afresh"

One reviewer underlined the fact that "McGuinness has whittled Sophocles's plays down to a succession of very short, simple lines that can be easily heard when sung across an auditorium", and that "Anderson's music fills the emotional space around these lines", to conclude that "[f]or all the antiquity of its roots, Thebans may point to the future of opera". Another reviewer declared that Frank McGuinness "has supplied what seems an eminently settable, elegant condensation of the drama", and that the opera as a whole offers "[t]he superb assurance of the writing metallically intent but underpinned by a novel harmonic richness".

== Film and television ==
McGuinness has written a number of film scripts. His script for Dancing at Lughnasa (Dir. Pat O'Connor, 2005) was an adaptation of the play of the same title by Brian Friel. This film's "most significant transformation of the play", one critic has pointed out, is the shifting of a defining dancing scene from the end of the first Act to the end of the story, which "reveals the defining principle of the film: it turns memory into ritual". McGuinness was also the author of the original script for "Talk of Angels", the cinema adaptation of Kate O'Brien's banned novel Mary Lavelle, although the script was considerably modified in the final production.

Discussing his childhood, McGuinness has explained that, while there were no books around when he was growing up, in addition to newspapers, they had "television, which is the great subverter, a wonderful wonderful (sic) source of entertainment at the time". His television films include Scout (BBC 1987), directed by Danny Boyle, about the talent scout for the football team Manchester United in Northern Ireland, and A Song for Jenny (BBC 2015), adapted from Julie Nicholson's book of the same title, about the aftermath of the 2005 Islamist terrorist bombings in London. McGuinness was also the scriptwriter for the ground-breaking television film "A Short Stay in Switzerland" (BBC 2009), dealing with euthanasia. In addition, McGuinness has scripted a number of documentaries for television, including The Messiah XXI (RTÉ, 2000), commemorating the premiere of Handel's oratorio Messiah in Dublin in 1791, and Happy Birthday Oscar Wilde (RTÉ, 2004), celebrating the Irish writer.

== Themes and opinions ==
Major recurring features of McGuinness's playwriting include the treatment of historical events and the prominent inclusion of gay or bisexual characters.

A writer's task, McGuiness declared in 2015, is "to do something that no one has done before, to discover". In the same interview, he added that: "The enquiring mind, the radical mind, will always be ill at ease about what is said about a particular subject."

== Awards and honours ==
Source for entries 1985-1999:

- 1985 London Evening Standard "Award for Most Promising Playwright" for Observe the Sons of Ulster Marching Towards the Somme
- 1985 Rooney Prize for Irish Literature for Observe the Sons …
- 1985 Arts Council Bursary for Observe the Sons …
- 1985 Harvey's Best Play Award for Observe the Sons …
- 1985 Cheltenham Literary Prize for Observe the Sons …
- 1986 London Fringe Awards for Best Play and Best Playwright New to the Fringe for Observe the Sons …
- 1986 Plays and Players Award for Most Promising Playwright for Observe the Sons …
- 1987 Ewart-Biggs Peace Prize for Observe the Sons …
- 1990 Prague International Television Awards for The Hen House (BBC2)
- 1992 New York Drama Critics Circle for Someone Who'll Watch Over Me
- 1992 Writers' Guild Award for Best Play for Someone Who'll Watch Over Me
- 1992 Independent Sunday Best Play of the Year Award for Someone Who'll Watch Over Me
- 1992 Oliver Award nomination for Someone Who'll Watch Over Me
- 1992 Tony Award nomination for Someone Who'll Watch Over Me
- 1992 Ireland Fund Literary Award
- 1996 Tony Award for Best Revival for A Doll's House
- 1997 French Order of Arts and Letters
- 1999 Oliver Award nomination for Best New Play for Dolly West's Kitchen
- 2010 BAFTA nomination for Best Single Drama for A Short Stay in Switzerland
- 2014 Irish PEN Award
- 2019 Tip O'Neill Irish Diaspora Award
- 2019 UCD Ulysses Medal

== List of works ==
=== Plays ===
- The Glass God (Platform Theatre Group, Dublin, 1982)
- The Factory Girls (Abbey Theatre, Dublin, 1982)
- Borderlands (TEAM Educational Theatre Company, 1984)
- Gatherers (TEAM Educational Theatre Company, 1985)
- Ladybag (Damer Theatre, Dublin for Dublin Theatre Festival, 1985)
- Baglady (Abbey Theatre, Dublin, 1985)
- Observe the Sons of Ulster Marching Towards the Somme (Abbey, 1985; Hampstead Theatre, London, 1986)
- Innocence (Gate Theatre, Dublin, 1986)
- Times in It (Peacock stage of Abbey Theatre, Dublin 1988: triple bill consisting of 'Feed the Money and Keep Them Coming'; 'Brides of Ladybag' and 'Flesh and Blood')
- Carthaginians (Abbey, 1988; Hampstead, 1989)
- Mary and Lizzie ([The Pit] Barbican / RSC, London, 1989)
- The Bread Man (The Gate Theatre, Dublin, 1990)
- Someone Who'll Watch Over Me—based on Brian Keenan's 'An Evil Cradling' (1992) (Hampstead, West End and Broadway, 1992)
- The Bird Sanctuary (Abbey Theatre, Dublin, 1993; Pittsburgh Public Theatre, 2005; )
- Mutabilitie (RNT, 1997)
- Dolly West's Kitchen (Abbey Theatre, Dublin, 1999)
- Speaking Like Magpies (RSC, The Swan Theatre, Stratford-upon-Avon, 2005)
- Gates of Gold (Gate Theatre, Dublin, 2002. UK premiere Finborough Theatre, 2004. West End transfer 2006.)
- There Came a Gypsy Riding (Almeida Theatre, London, 2007)
- The Holy Moley Jesus Story (Greash Theatre, Dublin, 2008)
- Greta Garbo Came to Donegal (Tricycle Theatre, London, 2010)
- The Match Box (Everyman Playhouse, Liverpool, 2012)
- The Hanging Gardens (Abbey Theatre, Dublin, 2013)
- Éamonn Ceannt, in 'Signatories' (Kilmainham Gaol, Dublin, 2016)
- The Visiting Hour (Gate Theatre, Dublin 2021)
- Dinner with Groucho (Civic Theatre, Dublin, 2022)

=== Adaptations ===
- Dracula, from the novel by Bram Stoker (Druid Theatre, Galway, 1986)
- Yerma by Federico García Lorca (Abbey, 1987)
- Rosmersholm by Henrik Ibsen (National Theatre, London—The Cotesloe--, 1987)
- The Threepenny Opera by Bertolt Brecht (The Gate Theatre, Dublin, 1991)
- Peer Gynt by Henrik Ibsen (Gate, 1988; RSC and world tour, 1994)
- Hedda Gabler by Henrik Ibsen (Roundabout Theatre, Broadway, 1994)
- Uncle Vanya by Anton Chekhov (Field Day Production on tour, Derry, 1995; Tricycle Theatre, London, 1995)
- The Caucasian Chalk Circle by Bertolt Brecht (RNT at the Oliver Theatre, London, 1997)
- A Doll's House by Henrik Ibsen (Playhouse Theatre, London, 1996; Belasco Theatre, NY, 1997; Fairfax Victorian Arts Centre, Melbourne, 1998)
- Electra by Sophocles (Minerva Theatre, Chichester, 1997; McCarter Theatre, Princeton, 1998; Ethel Barrymore Theatre, NY, 1998; The Project Theatre, Dublin, 2004—directed by Frank McGuinness--; The Old Vic, London, 2014)
- Three Sisters by Anton Chekhov (Gate and Royal Court, 1990)
- The House of Bernarda Alba by Federico Garcia Lorca (Lyric Theatre, Belfast, 1991)
- The Man with the Flower in his Mouth by Luigi Pirandello (The Project Theatre, Dublin 1993—double bill with 'The Stronger')
- The Stronger by August Strindberg (The Project Theatre, Dublin 1993—double bill with 'The Man with the Flower...')
- The Storm by Alexander Ostrovsky (The Almeida Theatre Company, London, 1998)
- Miss Julie by August Strindberg (Theatre Royal Haymarket, London, 2000;
- Barbaric Comedies by Ramón María del Vallé-Inclán—originally a cycle of three plays under that common title: 'Silver Face', 'Rampant Eagle', and 'Wolves Romance' (Abbey Theatre, Dublin, 2000; King's Theatre, Edinburgh, 2000)
- Hecuba by Euripides
- The Wild Duck by Henrik Ibsen (The Abbey Theatre, Dublin 2003)
- Hecuba by Euripides (Donmar Warehouse, London, 2004)
- Rebecca, from a novel by Daphne du Maurier (Theatre Royal, Newcastle-upon-Thyne, 2005)
- Phaedra by Racine (Donmar Warehouse, London, 2006)
- There Came a Gypsy Riding(Almeida Theatre, London, 2007)
- Oedipus by Sophocles (Royal National Theatre, 2008)
- Helen by Euripides (Shakespeare's Globe, 2008)
- John Gabriel Borkman by Henrik Ibsen (Abbey Theatre, 2010)
- Ghosts by Henrik Ibsen (London Classic Theatre, 2011)
- Damned by Despair by Tirso de Molina (English National Theatre, London, 2012)
- The Dead, from the short story by James Joyce (Abbey Theatre, Dublin, 2012)
- Tartuffe, by Molière (Abbey Theatre, Dublin, 2023)

=== Screenplays ===
- Scout (BBC2, 1987)
- The Hen House (BBC Northern Ireland, 1989)
- Dancing at Lughnasa, adaptation of play by Brian Friel) (Dir. Pat O'Connor, 1998)
- Talk of Angels, adaptation of the novel Mary Lavelle by Kate O'Brien (novelist). Anne Guedes, and Frank McGuinness (Dir. Nick Hamm, 1998)
- A Short Stay in Switzerland (BBC TV, 2009, based on the true story of Dr Anne Turner)
- A Song for Jenny (BBC TV, 2015)

=== Poetry ===
- Booterstown (Gallery Press, 1994)
- In Loving Memory (Limerick City Gallery of Art, 1989, with photographs by Amelia Stein)
- The Sea with no Ships (Gallery Press, 1999)
- The Stone Jug (Gallery Press, 2003)
- Dulse (Gallery Press, 2007)
- In a Town of Five Thousand People (Gallery Press, 2012)
- The Wedding Breakfast (Gallery Press, 2019)
- May Twenty-second (Gallery Press, 2022)

=== Opera ===
- Thebans—Libretto by Frank McGuinness, after Sophocles, set to music by Julian Anderson (London Opera Company, 2014)

=== Musical ===
- Donegal (Abbey Theatre Dublin, 2016)

=== Fiction ===
- Arimathea (Brandon, 2013)
- The Woodcutter & his Family (O'Brien Press, 2017)
- Paprika: Stories (Brandon, 2018)

== Personal life ==
McGuinness is gay. He has been in a relationship with his partner, Philip, since 1979.
