= Citizen Kane =

1941 drama film by Orson Welles

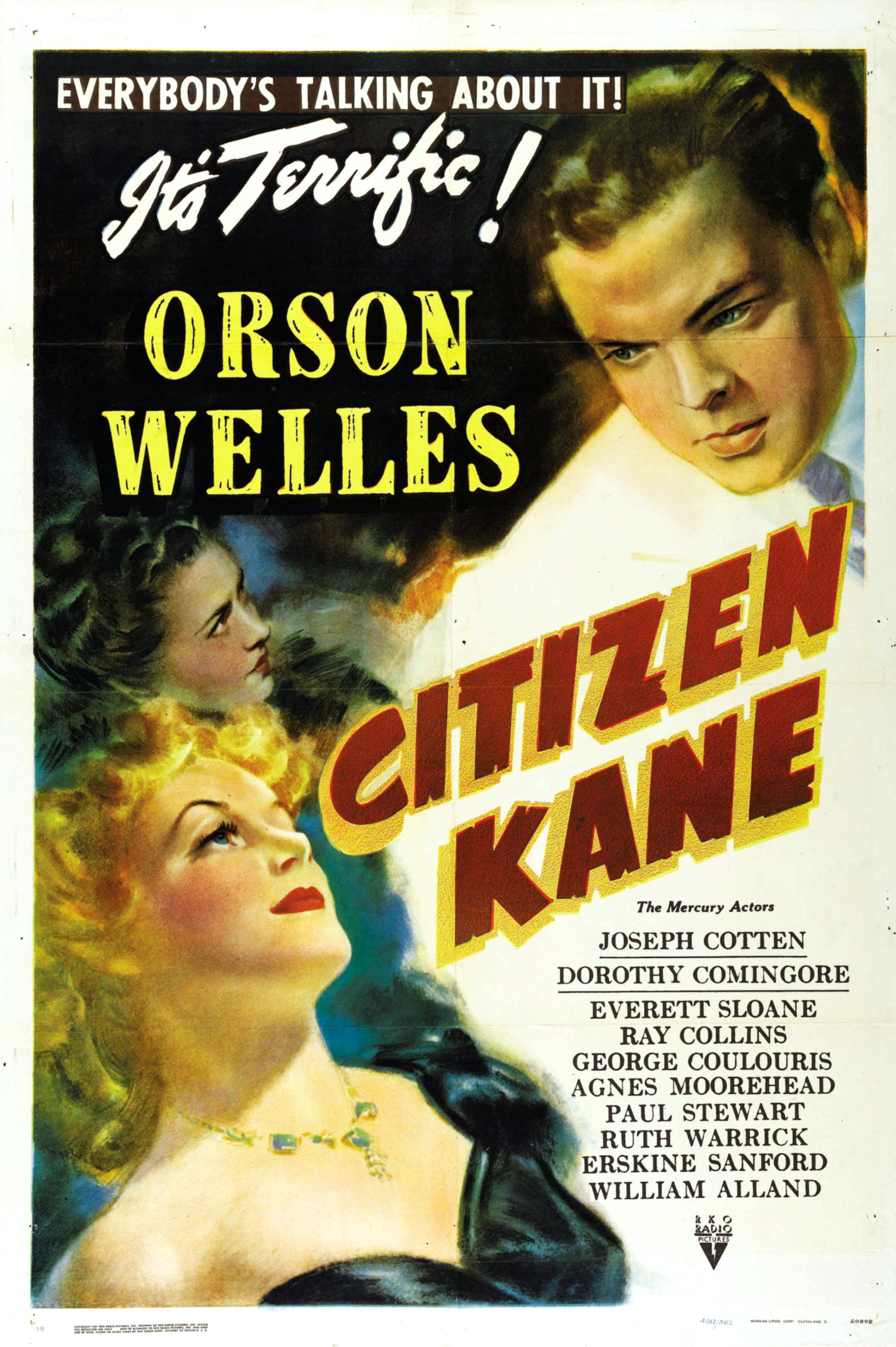
- Theatrical release poster (Style B) by William Rose
- Directed by: Orson Welles
- Screenplay by: Herman J. Mankiewicz; Orson Welles
- Produced by: Orson Welles
- Starring: Orson Welles; Joseph Cotten; Dorothy Comingore; Everett Sloane; Ray Collins; George Coulouris; Agnes Moorehead; Paul Stewart; Ruth Warrick; Erskine Sanford; William Alland
- Cinematography: Gregg Toland
- Edited by: Robert Wise
- Music by: Bernard Herrmann
- Production companies: RKO Radio Pictures; Mercury Productions
- Distributed by: RKO Radio Pictures
- Release dates: May 1, 1941 (Palace Theatre); September 5, 1941 (United States)
- Running time: 119 minutes
- Country: United States
- Language: English
- Budget: $839,727
- Box office: $1.8 million (re-release)

Citizen Kane is a 1941 American drama film directed, produced by, and starring Orson Welles and co-written by Welles and Herman J. Mankiewicz, and was Welles's first feature film. The quasi-biographical film examines the life and legacy of Charles Foster Kane, played by Welles, a composite character based on American media barons William Randolph Hearst and Joseph Pulitzer, and Chicago tycoons Samuel Insull and Harold McCormick, as well as aspects of the screenwriters' own lives.

After the Broadway success of Welles's Mercury Theatre and the controversial 1938 radio broadcast "The War of the Worlds" on The Mercury Theatre on the Air, Welles was courted by Hollywood. He signed a contract with RKO Pictures in 1939. Although it was unusual for an untried director, he was given freedom to develop his own story, to use his own cast and crew, and to have final cut privilege. Following two abortive attempts to get a project off the ground, he wrote the screenplay for Citizen Kane with Herman J. Mankiewicz. Principal photography took place in 1940, the same year that its innovative trailer was shown, and the film was released in 1941.

Upon its release, Hearst prohibited any mention of the film in his newspapers. Although it was a critical success, Citizen Kane failed to recoup its costs at the box office. The film faded from view after its release, but returned to public attention when it was praised by French critics such as André Bazin and re-released in 1956. In 1958, the film was voted number nine on the prestigious Brussels 12 list at the 1958 World Expo.

Citizen Kane is frequently cited as the greatest film ever made. For 50 years (five decennial polls: 1962, 1972, 1982, 1992 and 2002), it stood at number one in the British Film Institute's Sight and Sound decennial poll, and it topped the American Film Institute's 100 Years ... 100 Movies list in 1998, as well as its 2007 update. The Library of Congress selected Citizen Kane as an inductee of the 1989 inaugural group of 25 films for preservation in the United States National Film Registry for being "culturally, historically, or aesthetically significant". The film was nominated for Academy Awards in nine categories and it won for Best Writing (Original Screenplay) by Mankiewicz and Welles. Citizen Kane is praised for Gregg Toland's cinematography, Robert Wise's editing, Bernard Herrmann's score and its narrative structure, all of which have been considered innovative and precedent-setting.

== Plot ==
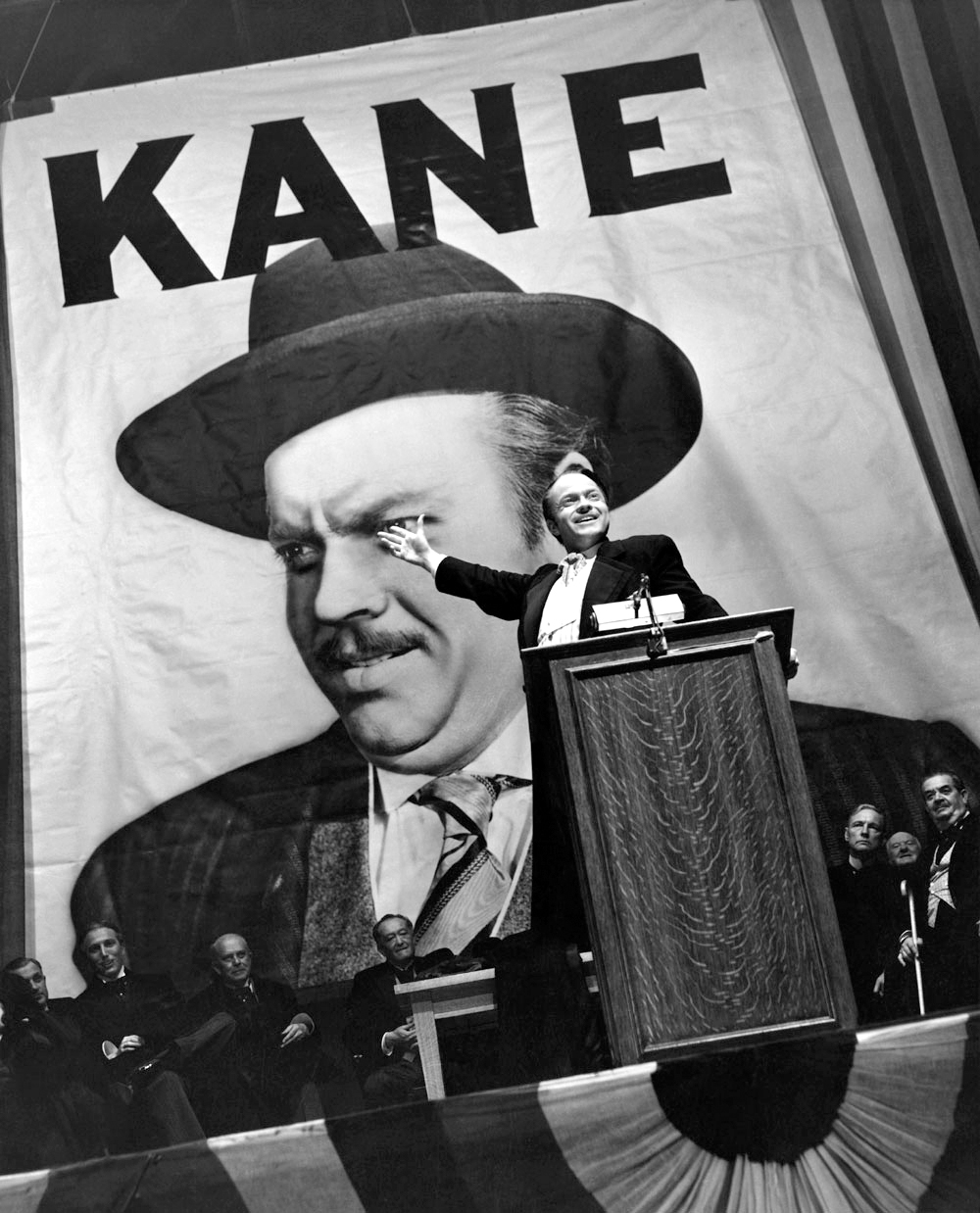
Favored to win election as governor, Kane makes a campaign speech at Madison Square Garden.

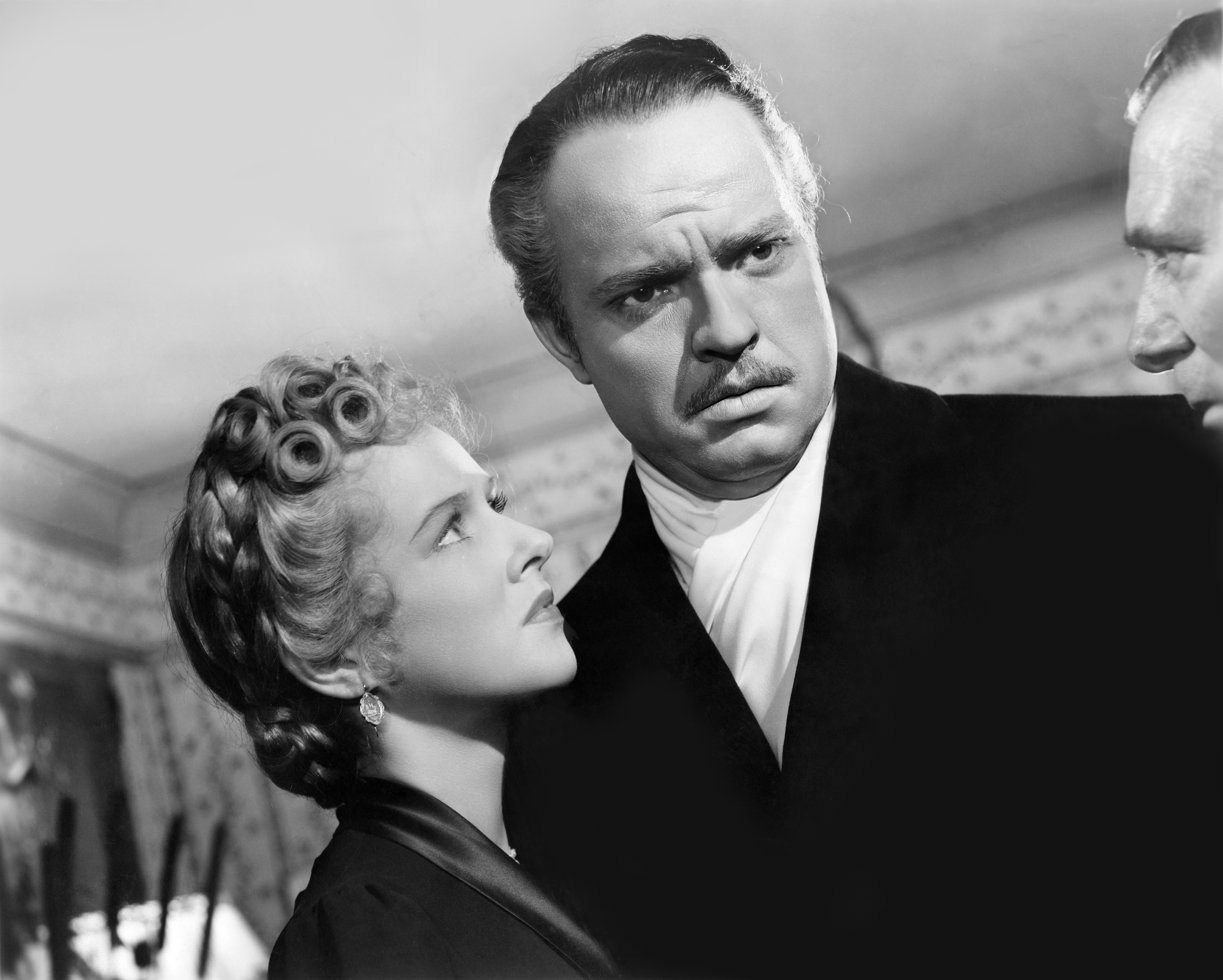
The affair between Kane and Susan Alexander (Dorothy Comingore) is exposed by his political opponent, Boss Jim W. Gettys (Ray Collins).

On a vast palatial estate in Florida, elderly wealthy newspaper publisher and industry magnate Charles Foster Kane dies in his mansion, Xanadu, uttering his last word, "Rosebud". With Kane's death sensational news around the world, a newsreel producer tasks reporter Jerry Thompson with discovering the meaning of "Rosebud". Thompson sets out to interview Kane's friends and associates. He tries to approach Kane's second wife, Susan Alexander Kane, now an alcoholic nightclub owner, but she refuses to talk to him.

Thompson goes to the private archive of the late banker Walter Parks Thatcher, where he learns of Kane's early years in a Colorado boarding house. When gold was discovered in 1871 through a mining deed belonging to Kane's mother, Mary Kane, she hired Thatcher to establish a trust that would provide for Kane's education and assume guardianship of him, protecting him from his brutal father. While the young Kane plays happily in the snow with his sled, his parents introduce him to Thatcher and tell him he will live with him, prompting the boy to angrily strike Thatcher with his sled and attempt to run away.

At age 25, Kane gained control of his trust and, through the mine's productivity and Thatcher's shrewd investing, becomes one of the richest men in the world. Kane bought the New York Inquirer newspaper and embarked on a career of yellow journalism, publishing scandalous articles that attacked Thatcher's (and his own) business interests. Thompson interviews Kane's personal business manager, Mr. Bernstein, who recalls that Kane hired the best journalists available to build the Inquirer's circulation. Kane rose to power by successfully manipulating public opinion regarding the Spanish–American War and marrying Emily Norton, the niece of the President of the United States, before eventually selling the newspaper to Thatcher in the aftermath of the 1929 stock market crash.

Thompson interviews Kane's estranged best friend, Jedediah Leland, in a retirement home. Leland says that Kane's marriage to Emily disintegrated over the years, despite their having a son, and he began an affair with amateur singer Susan Alexander while running for Governor of New York as a "fighting liberal". His opponent, Jim W. Gettys, discovered the affair, revealing it to Emily and the press, the public scandal ending Kane's political career. Kane married Susan and forced her into becoming an opera singer, which she had neither talent nor ambition for, and built a large opera house in Chicago for her to perform in. Kane fired Leland from the Inquirer after he wrote a bad review of Susan's disastrous opera debut, finishing and printing the negative review himself. Susan protested that she never wanted the opera career anyway, but Kane forced her to continue the season.

Susan consents to an interview with Thompson and describes the aftermath of her opera career, which Kane allowed her to end after she attempted suicide. After many unhappy years at Xanadu, Kane and Susan's relationship turns bitter and violent, prompting Susan to leave. Kane's butler Raymond recounts that, after Susan moved out of Xanadu, Kane began violently destroying the contents of her former bedroom. When Kane discovered a snow globe, he calmed down and tearfully said "Rosebud". Having exhausted every lead, Thompson concludes that he cannot solve the mystery and that the meaning of Kane's last word will remain unknown. Kane's possessions at Xanadu are catalogued or discarded by the mansion's staff, who find the sled the eight-year-old Kane was playing on the day he was taken from his home in Colorado, and throw it into a furnace with other items. Unbeknownst to anyone, the sled's trade name is "Rosebud".

== Cast ==
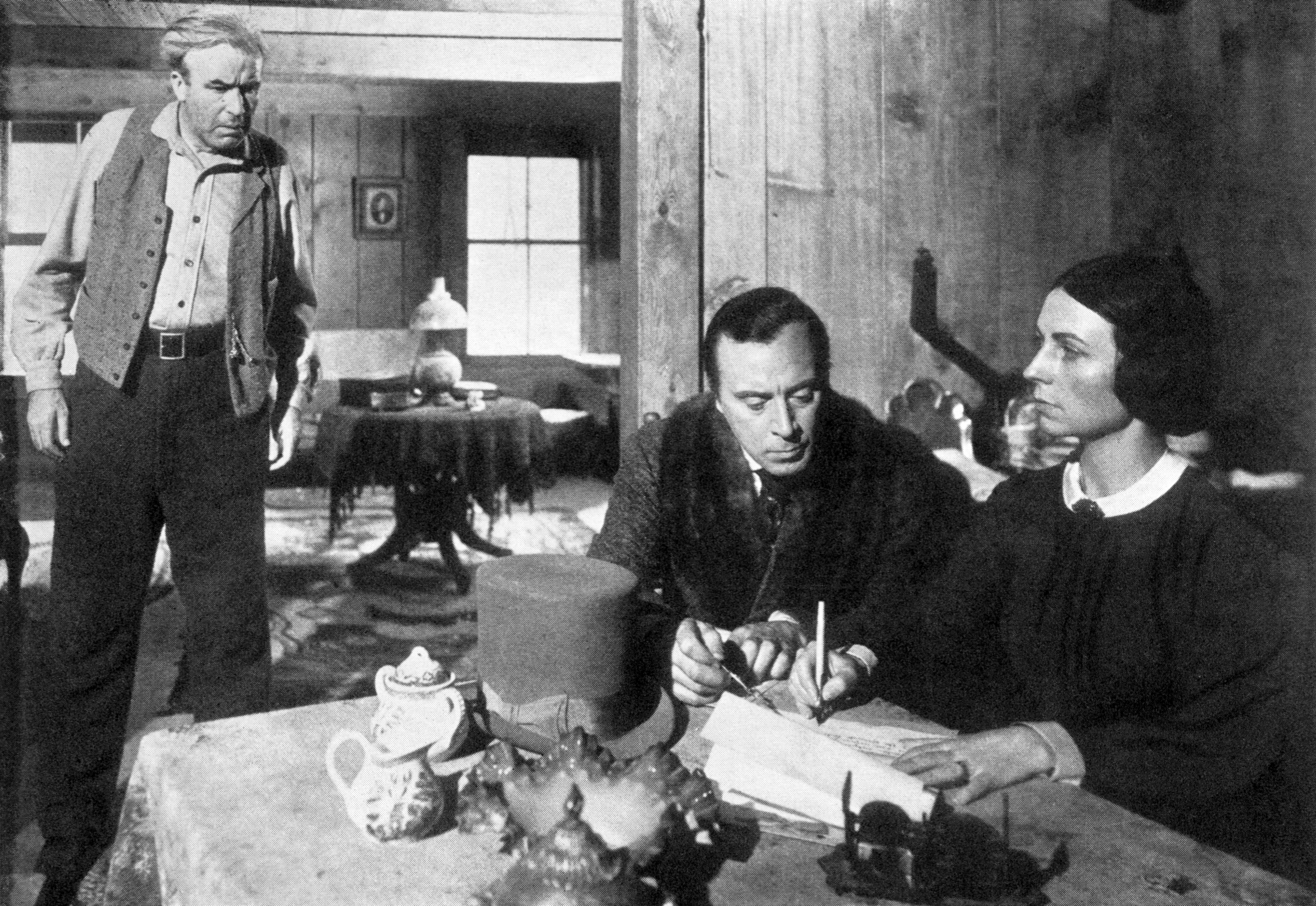
Harry Shannon, George Coulouris and Agnes Moorehead

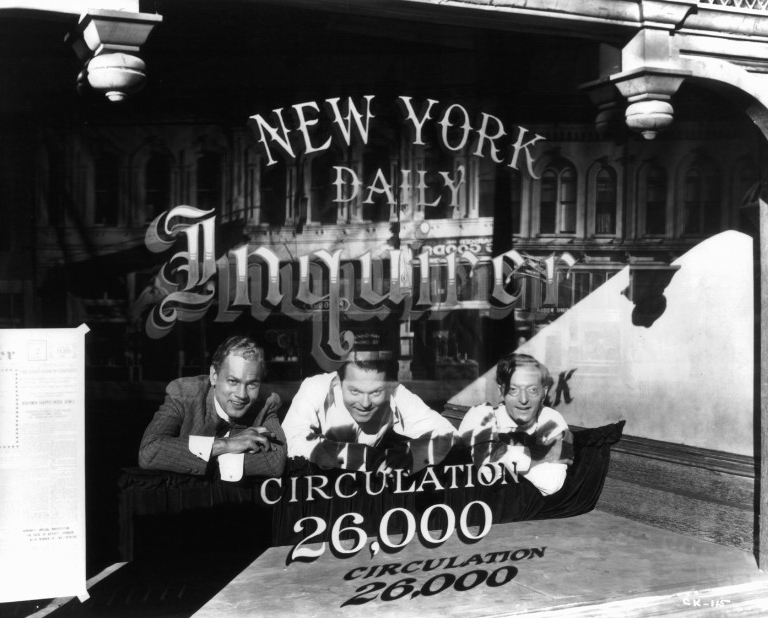
Joseph Cotten, Orson Welles and Everett Sloane

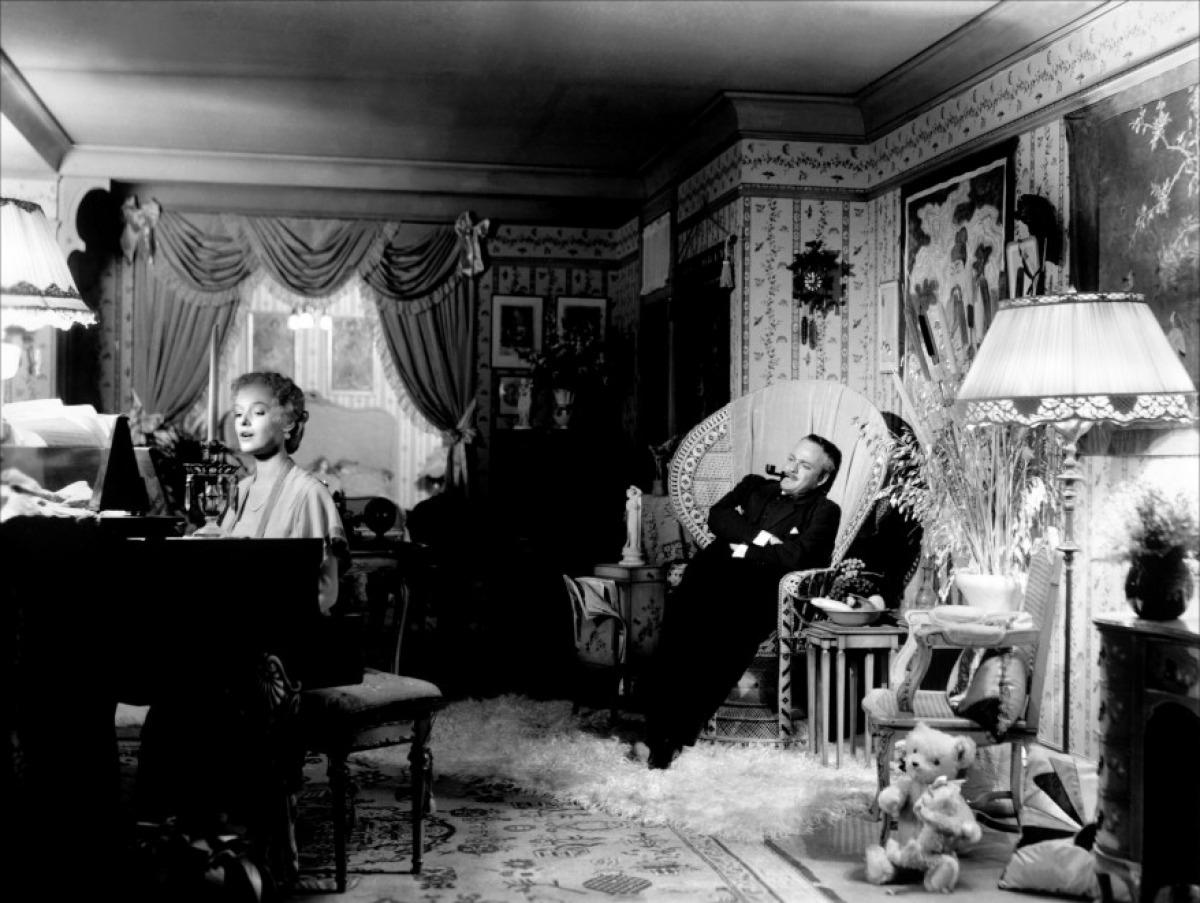
Dorothy Comingore and Orson Welles

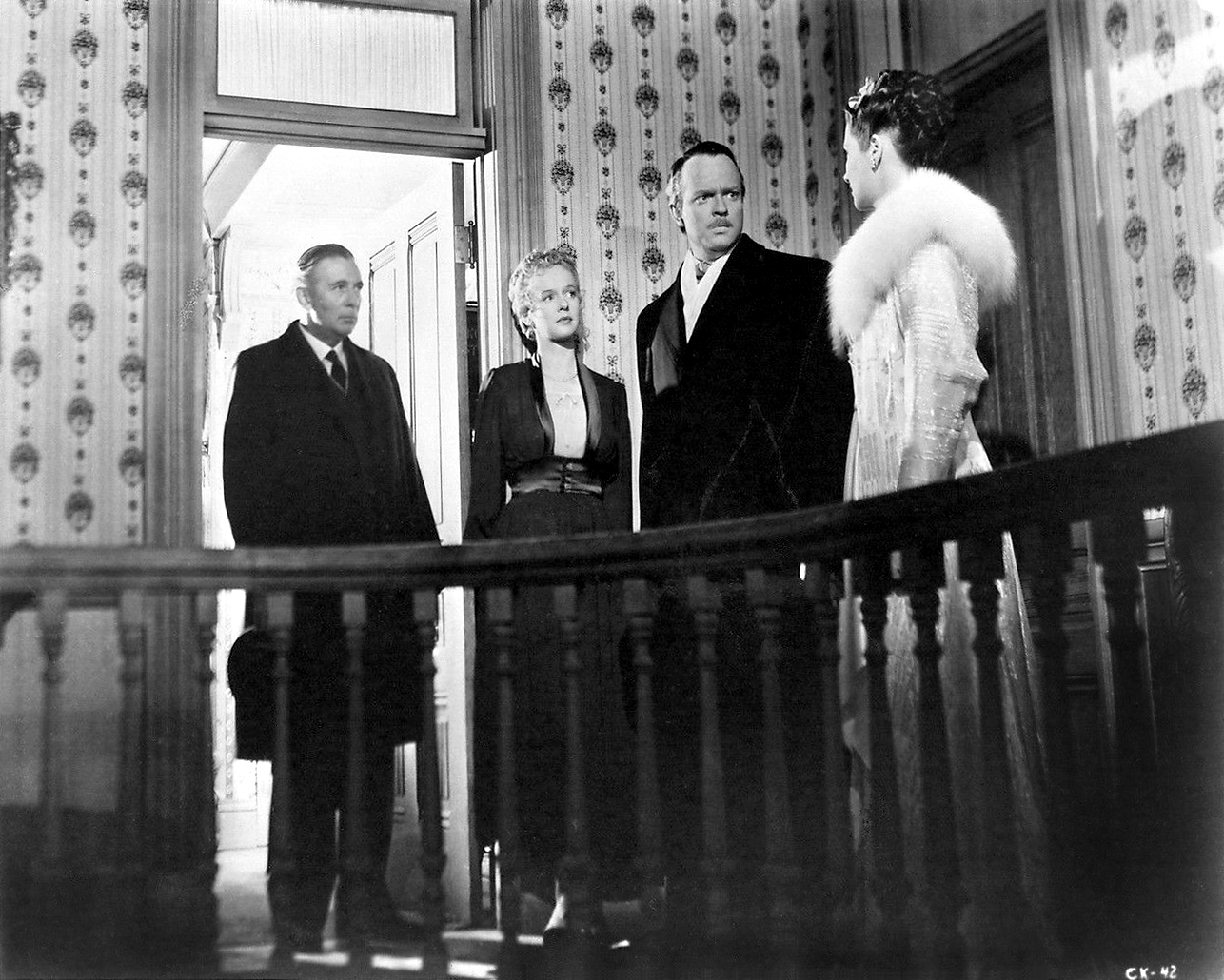
Ray Collins, Dorothy Comingore, Orson Welles and Ruth Warrick

The beginning of the film's ending credits states that "Most of the principal actors in Citizen Kane are new to motion pictures. The Mercury Theatre is proud to introduce them." The cast is then listed in the following order, with Orson Welles' credit for playing Charles Foster Kane appearing last:

- Joseph Cotten as Jedediah Leland, Kane's best friend and drama critic for The Inquirer. Cotten also appears (hidden in darkness) in the News on the March screening room.
- Dorothy Comingore as Susan Alexander Kane, Kane's mistress and second wife.
- Agnes Moorehead as Mary Kane, Kane's mother.
- Ruth Warrick as Emily Monroe Norton Kane, Kane's first wife.
- Ray Collins as Jim W. Gettys, Kane's political rival for the post of Governor of New York.
- Erskine Sanford as Herbert Carter, editor of The Inquirer. Sanford also appears (hidden in darkness) in the News on the March screening room.
- Everett Sloane as Mr. Bernstein, Kane's friend and business manager at The Inquirer.
- William Alland as Jerry Thompson, a reporter for News on the March. Alland also voices the narrator of the News on the March newsreel.
- Paul Stewart as Raymond, Kane's butler.
- George Coulouris as Walter Parks Thatcher, a banker who becomes Kane's legal guardian.
- Fortunio Bonanova as Signor Matiste, vocal coach of Susan Alexander Kane.
- Gus Schilling as John, headwaiter at the El Rancho nightclub. Schilling also appears (hidden in darkness) in the News on the March screening room.
- Philip Van Zandt as Mr. Rawlston, News on the March producer.
- Georgia Backus as Bertha Anderson, attendant at the library of Walter Parks Thatcher.
- Harry Shannon as Jim Kane, Kane's father.
- Sonny Bupp as Charles Foster Kane III, Kane's son.
- Buddy Swan as Charles Foster Kane, age eight.
- Orson Welles as Charles Foster Kane, a wealthy newspaper publisher.

Additionally, Charles Bennett appears as the entertainer at the head of the chorus line in the Inquirer party sequence, and cinematographer Gregg Toland makes a cameo appearance as an interviewer depicted in part of the News on the March newsreel. Actor Alan Ladd, still unknown at that time, makes a small appearance as a reporter smoking a pipe at the end of the film.

== Production ==
=== Development ===
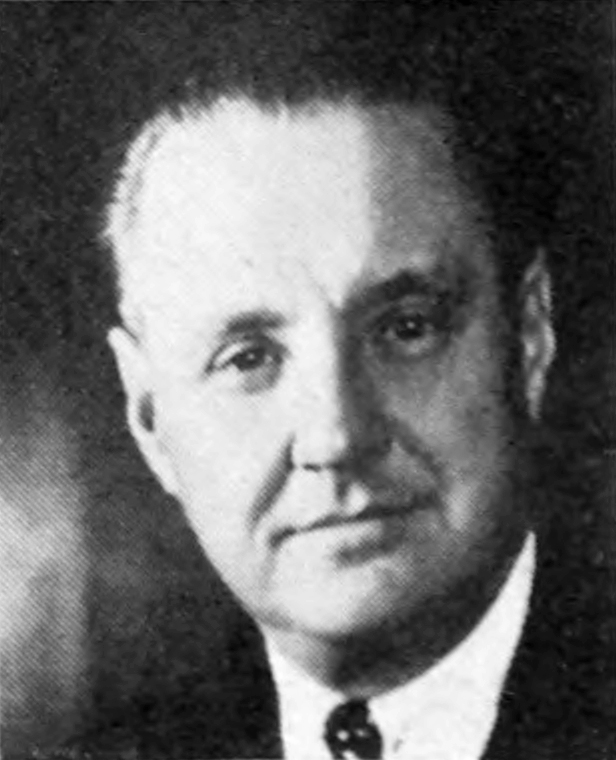
Welles's 1938 radio broadcast of "The War of the Worlds" caught the attention of RKO studio chief George J. Schaefer.

Hollywood had shown interest in Welles as early as 1936. He turned down three scripts sent to him by Warner Bros. In 1937, he declined offers from David O. Selznick, who asked him to head his film company's story department, and William Wyler, who wanted him for a supporting role in Wuthering Heights. "Although the possibility of making huge amounts of money in Hollywood greatly attracted him," wrote biographer Frank Brady, "he was still totally, hopelessly, insanely in love with the theater, and it is there that he had every intention of remaining to make his mark."

Following the 1938 "The War of the Worlds" broadcast of his CBS radio series The Mercury Theatre on the Air, Welles was lured to Hollywood with a remarkable contract. RKO Pictures studio head George J. Schaefer wanted to work with Welles after the notorious broadcast, believing that Welles had a gift for attracting mass attention. RKO was also uncharacteristically profitable and was entering into a series of independent production contracts that would add more artistically prestigious films to its roster. Throughout the spring and early summer of 1939, Schaefer constantly tried to lure the reluctant Welles to Hollywood. Welles was in financial trouble after failure of his plays Five Kings and The Green Goddess. At first he simply wanted to spend three months in Hollywood and earn enough money to pay his debts and fund his next theatrical season. Welles first arrived on July 20, 1939, and on his first tour, he called the movie studio "the greatest electric train set a boy ever had".

Welles signed his contract with RKO on August 21, which stipulated that Welles would act in, direct, produce and write two films. Mercury would get $100,000 for the first film by January 1, 1940, plus 20% of profits after RKO recouped $500,000, and $125,000 for a second film by January 1, 1941, plus 20% of profits after RKO recouped $500,000. The most controversial aspect of the contract was granting Welles complete artistic control of the two films so long as RKO approved both projects' stories and the budget did not exceed $500,000. RKO executives would not be allowed to see any footage until Welles chose to show it to them, and no cuts could be made to either film without Welles's approval. Welles was allowed to develop the story without interference, select his own cast and crew, and have the right of final cut. Granting the final cut privilege was unprecedented for a studio because it placed artistic considerations over financial investment. The contract was deeply resented in the film industry, and the Hollywood press took every opportunity to mock RKO and Welles. Schaefer remained a great supporter and saw the unprecedented contract as good publicity. Film scholar Robert L. Carringer wrote, "The simple fact seems to be that Schaefer believed Welles was going to pull off something really big almost as much as Welles did himself."

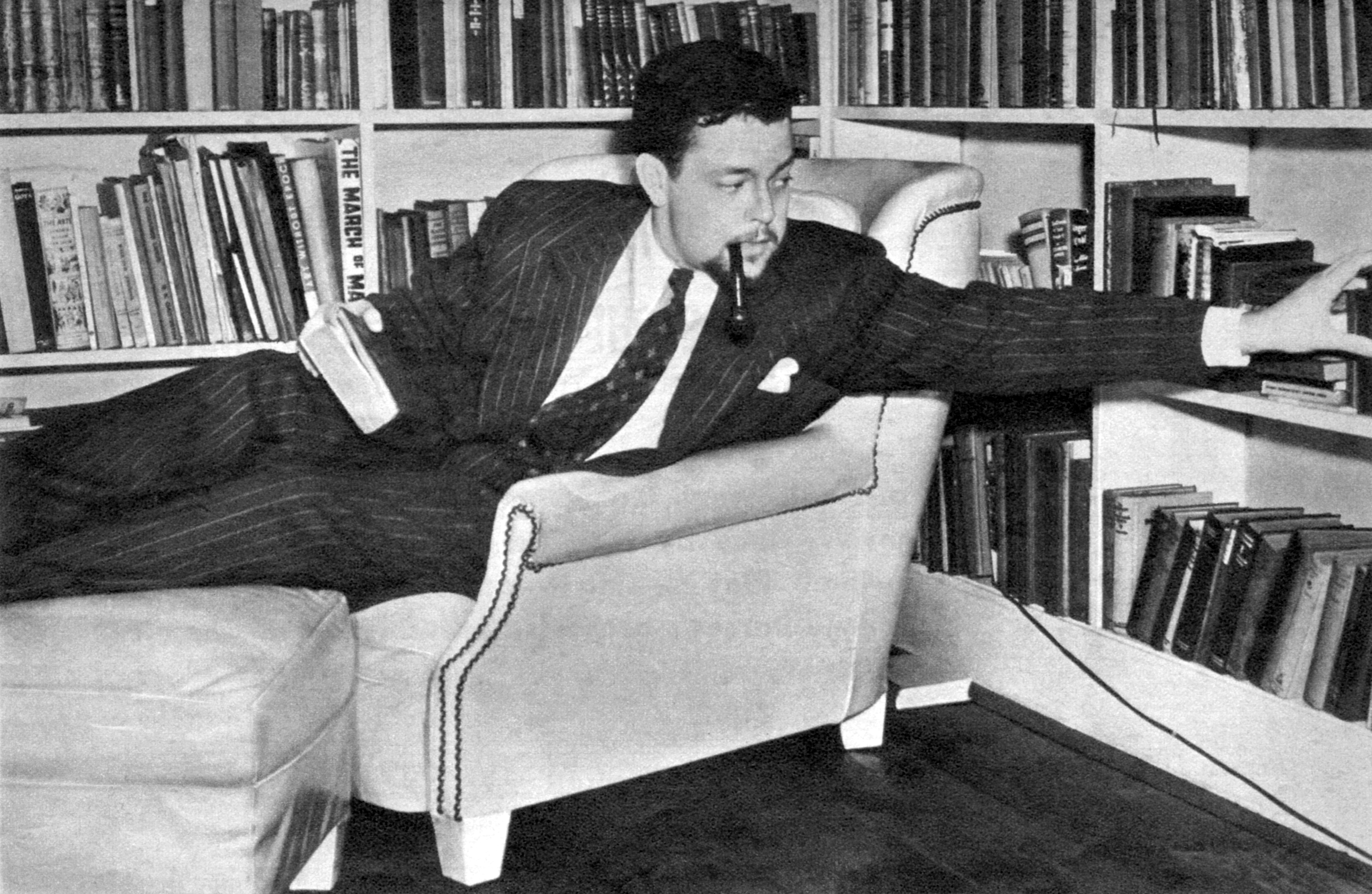
Orson Welles at his Hollywood home in 1939, during the long months it took to launch his first film project

Welles spent the first five months of his RKO contract trying to get his first project going, without success. "They are laying bets over on the RKO lot that the Orson Welles deal will end up without Orson ever doing a picture there," wrote The Hollywood Reporter. It was agreed that Welles would film Heart of Darkness, previously adapted for The Mercury Theatre on the Air, which would be presented entirely through a first-person camera. After elaborate pre-production and a day of test shooting with a hand-held camera—unheard of at the time—the project never reached production because Welles was unable to trim $50,000 from its budget. (Note: "I did a very elaborate production for [Heart of Darkness], such as I've never done again—never could," Welles said. "I shot my bolt on preproduction on that picture. We designed every camera setup and everything else—did enormous research in aboriginal, Stone Age cultures in order to reproduce what the story called for. I'm sorry not to have got the chance to do it.") (Note: Welles later used the subjective camera in The Magnificent Ambersons, in a sequence that was later all but eliminated because it did not work in that picture. "Heart of Darkness is one of the few stories that it's very well adapted to, because it relies so heavily on narration," Welles said. "The camera was going to be Marlow ... He's in the pilot house and he can see himself reflected in the glass through which you see the jungle. So it isn't that business of a hand-held camera mooching around pretending to walk like a man.") Schaefer told Welles that the $500,000 budget could not be exceeded; as war loomed, revenue was declining sharply in Europe by the fall of 1939.

He then started work on the idea that became Citizen Kane. Knowing the script would take time to prepare, Welles suggested to RKO that while that was being done—"so the year wouldn't be lost"—he make a humorous political thriller. Welles proposed The Smiler with a Knife, from a novel by Cecil Day-Lewis. When that project stalled in December 1939, Welles began brainstorming other story ideas with screenwriter Herman J. Mankiewicz, who had been writing Mercury radio scripts. "Arguing, inventing, discarding, these two powerful, headstrong, dazzlingly articulate personalities thrashed toward Kane", wrote biographer Richard Meryman.

=== Screenplay ===
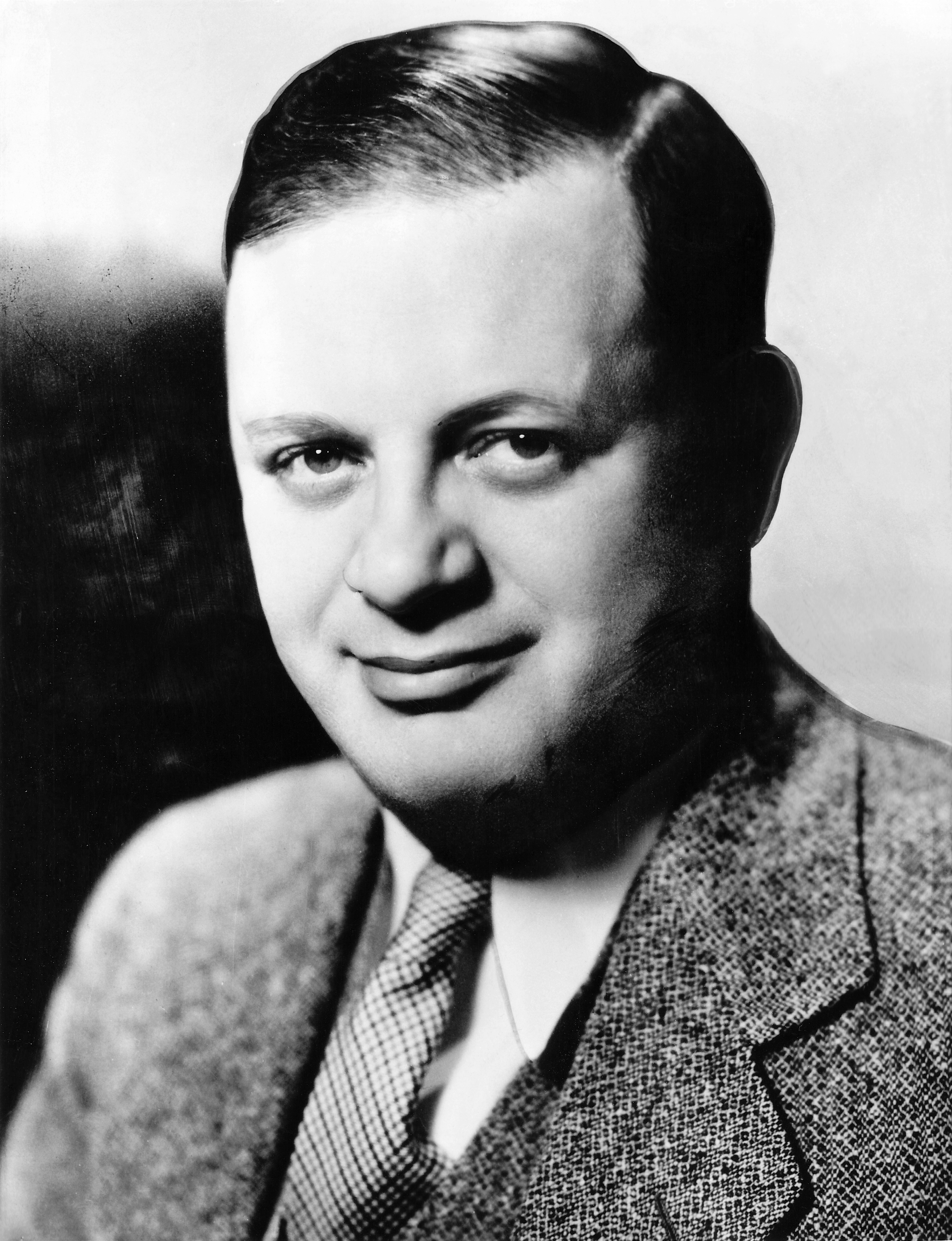
Herman J. Mankiewicz co-wrote the script in early 1940. He and Welles separately re-wrote and revised each other's work until Welles was satisfied with the finished product.

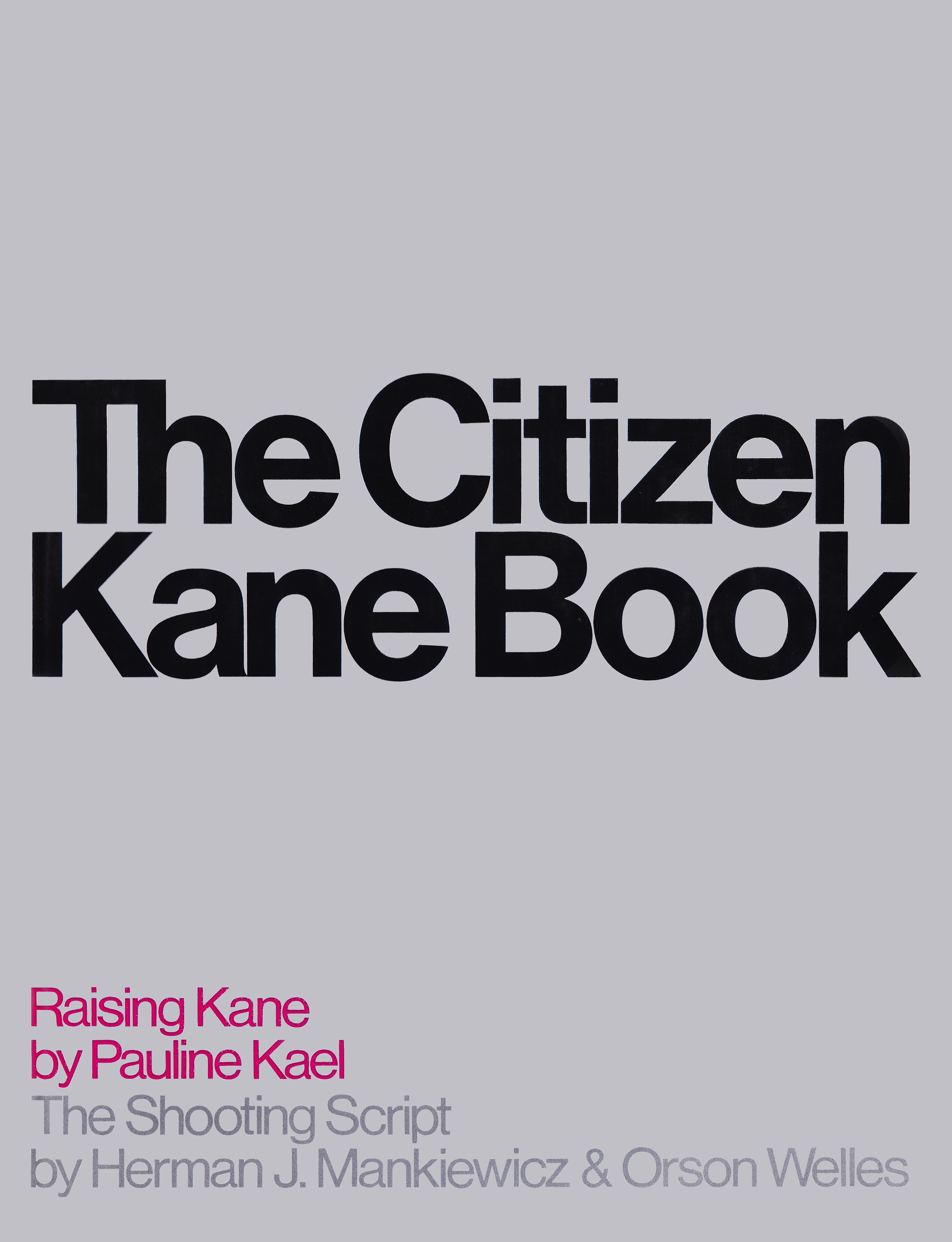
Pauline Kael's controversial essay "Raising Kane" was published in The New Yorker and in The Citizen Kane Book (1971).

I wished to make a motion picture which was not a narrative of action so much as an examination of character. For this, I desired a man of many sides and many aspects. It was my idea to show that six or more people could have as many widely divergent opinions concerning the nature of a single personality...There have been many motion pictures and novels rigorously obeying the formula of the "success story". I wished to do something quite different. I wished to make a picture which might be called a "failure story".

— Press statement issued by Welles regarding the impending release of Citizen Kane (January 15, 1941)

One of the long-standing controversies about Citizen Kane has been the authorship of the screenplay. Welles conceived the project with screenwriter Herman J. Mankiewicz, who was writing radio plays for Welles's CBS Radio series, The Campbell Playhouse. Mankiewicz based the original outline on the life of William Randolph Hearst, whom he knew socially and came to hate after being exiled from Hearst's circle.

In February 1940 Welles supplied Mankiewicz with 300 pages of notes and put him under contract to write the first draft screenplay under the supervision of John Houseman, Welles's former partner in the Mercury Theatre. Welles later explained, "I left him on his own finally, because we'd started to waste too much time haggling. So, after mutual agreements on storyline and character, Mank went off with Houseman and did his version, while I stayed in Hollywood and wrote mine." Taking these drafts, Welles drastically condensed and rearranged them, then added scenes of his own. The industry accused Welles of underplaying Mankiewicz's contribution to the script, but Welles countered the attacks by saying, "At the end, naturally, I was the one making the picture, after all—who had to make the decisions. I used what I wanted of Mank's and, rightly or wrongly, kept what I liked of my own."

The contract stated that Mankiewicz was to receive no credit for his work, as he was hired as a script doctor. Before he signed the contract Mankiewicz was advised by his agents that all credit for his work belonged to Welles and the Mercury Theatre, the "author and creator". As the film neared release, however, Mankiewicz began wanting a writing credit and even threatened to take out full-page advertisements in trade papers and to get his friend Ben Hecht to write an exposé for The Saturday Evening Post. Mankiewicz also threatened to go to the Screen Writers Guild and claim full credit for writing the entire script by himself.

After lodging a protest with the Screen Writers Guild, Mankiewicz withdrew it, then vacillated. The question was resolved in January 1941 when the studio, RKO Pictures, awarded Mankiewicz credit. The guild credit form listed Welles first, Mankiewicz second. Welles's assistant Richard Wilson said that the person who circled Mankiewicz's name in pencil, then drew an arrow that put it in first place, was Welles. The official credit reads, "Screenplay by Herman J. Mankiewicz and Orson Welles". Mankiewicz's rancor toward Welles grew over the remaining twelve years of his life.

Questions over the authorship of the Citizen Kane screenplay were revived in 1971 by influential film critic Pauline Kael, whose controversial 50,000-word essay "Raising Kane" was commissioned as an introduction to the shooting script in The Citizen Kane Book, published in October 1971. In it she called Citizen Kane the "culmination" of that "sustained feat of careless magic we call 'thirties comedy.'" The book-length essay first appeared in February 1971, in two consecutive issues of The New Yorker magazine. In the ensuing controversy, Welles was defended by colleagues, critics, biographers and scholars, but his reputation was damaged by its charges. The essay's thesis was later questioned and some of Kael's findings were also contested in later years.

Questions of authorship continued to come into sharper focus with Carringer's 1978 thoroughly researched essay, "The Scripts of Citizen Kane". (Note: First published in Critical Inquiry, "The Scripts of Citizen Kane" was described by Rosenbaum as "the definitive piece of scholarship on the authorship of Kane—and sadly one of the least well known". He wrote that many biographers may wrongly assume that Carringer included all of its facts in his later book, The Making of Citizen Kane.) Carringer studied the collection of script records—"almost a day-to-day record of the history of the scripting"—that was then still intact at RKO. He reviewed all seven drafts and concluded that "the full evidence reveals that Welles's contribution to the Citizen Kane script was not only substantial but definitive."

=== Casting ===
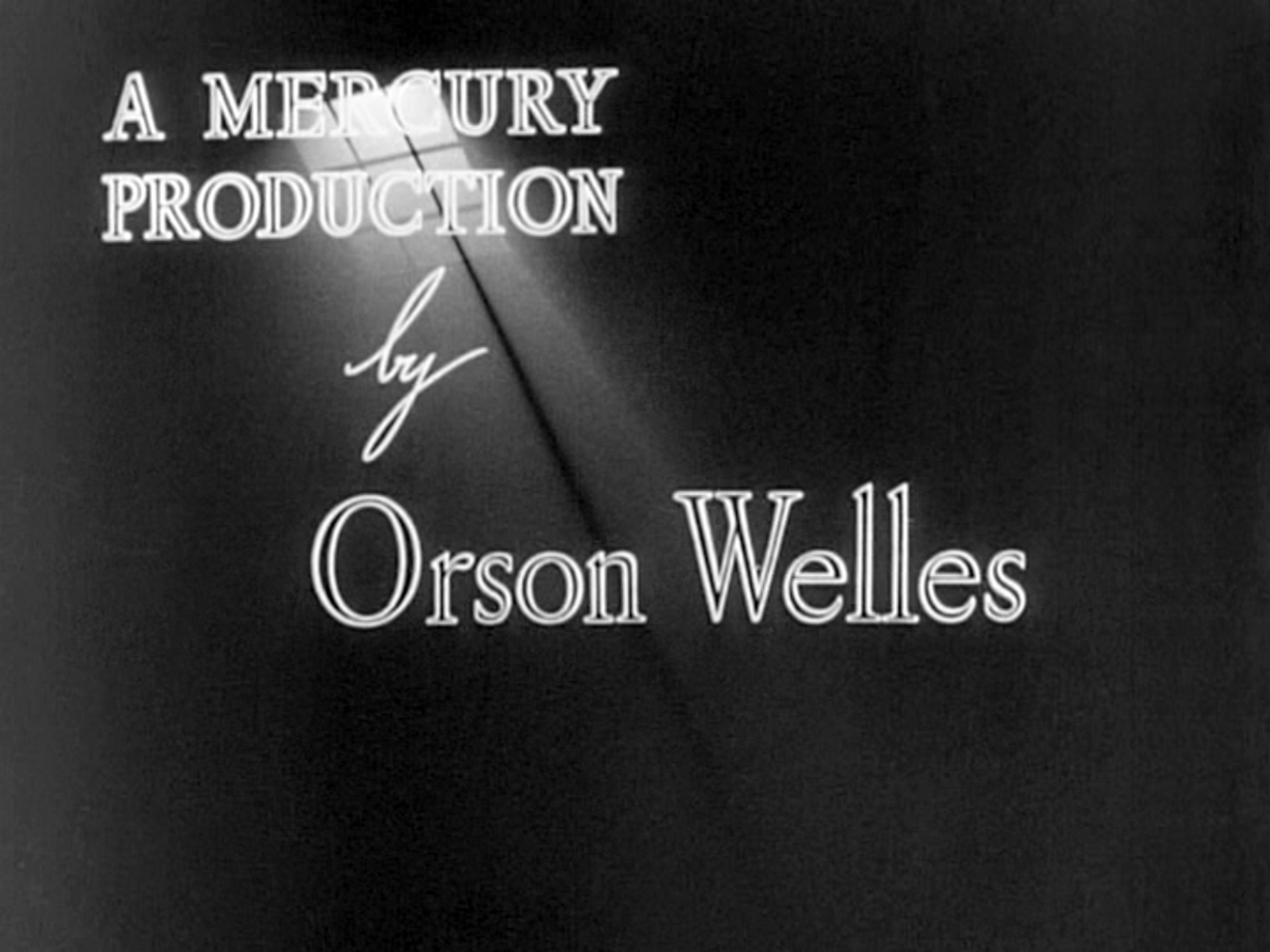
The Mercury Theatre was an independent repertory theatre company founded by Orson Welles and John Houseman in 1937. The company produced theatrical presentations, radio programs, films, promptbooks and phonographic recordings.

Citizen Kane was a rare film in that its principal roles were played by actors new to motion pictures. Ten were billed as Mercury Actors, members of the skilled repertory company assembled by Welles for the stage and radio performances of the Mercury Theatre, an independent theater company he founded with Houseman in 1937. "He loved to use the Mercury players," wrote biographer Charles Higham, "and consequently he launched several of them on movie careers."

The film represents the feature film debuts of William Alland, Ray Collins, Joseph Cotten, Agnes Moorehead, Erskine Sanford, Everett Sloane, Paul Stewart and Welles himself. Despite never having appeared in feature films, some of the cast members were already well known to the public. Cotten had recently become a Broadway star in the hit play The Philadelphia Story with Katharine Hepburn and Sloane was well known for his role on the radio show The Goldbergs. (Note: According to RKO records, Sloane was paid $2,400 for shaving his head.) Mercury actor George Coulouris was a star of the stage in New York and London.

Not all of the cast came from the Mercury Players. Welles cast Dorothy Comingore, an actress who played supporting parts in films since 1938 using the name "Linda Winters", as Susan Alexander Kane. A discovery of Charlie Chaplin, Comingore was recommended to Welles by Chaplin, who then met Comingore at a party in Los Angeles and immediately cast her.

Welles had met stage actress Ruth Warrick while visiting New York on a break from Hollywood and remembered her as a good fit for Emily Norton Kane, later saying that she looked the part. Warrick told Carringer that she was struck by the extraordinary resemblance between herself and Welles's mother when she saw a photograph of Beatrice Ives Welles. She characterized her own personal relationship with Welles as motherly.

"He trained us for films at the same time that he was training himself," recalled Agnes Moorehead. "Orson believed in good acting, and he realized that rehearsals were needed to get the most from his actors. That was something new in Hollywood: nobody seemed interested in bringing in a group to rehearse before scenes were shot. But Orson knew it was necessary, and we rehearsed every sequence before it was shot."

When The March of Time narrator Westbrook Van Voorhis asked for $25,000 to narrate the News on the March sequence, Alland demonstrated his ability to imitate Van Voorhis, and Welles cast him.

Welles later said that casting character actor Gino Corrado in the small part of the waiter at the El Rancho broke his heart. Corrado had appeared in many Hollywood films, often as a waiter, and Welles wanted all of the actors to be new to films. Other uncredited roles went to Thomas A. Curran as Teddy Roosevelt in the faux newsreel; Richard Baer as Hillman, a man at Madison Square Garden, and a man in the News on the March screening room; and Alan Ladd, Arthur O'Connell and Louise Currie as reporters at Xanadu.

=== Filming ===
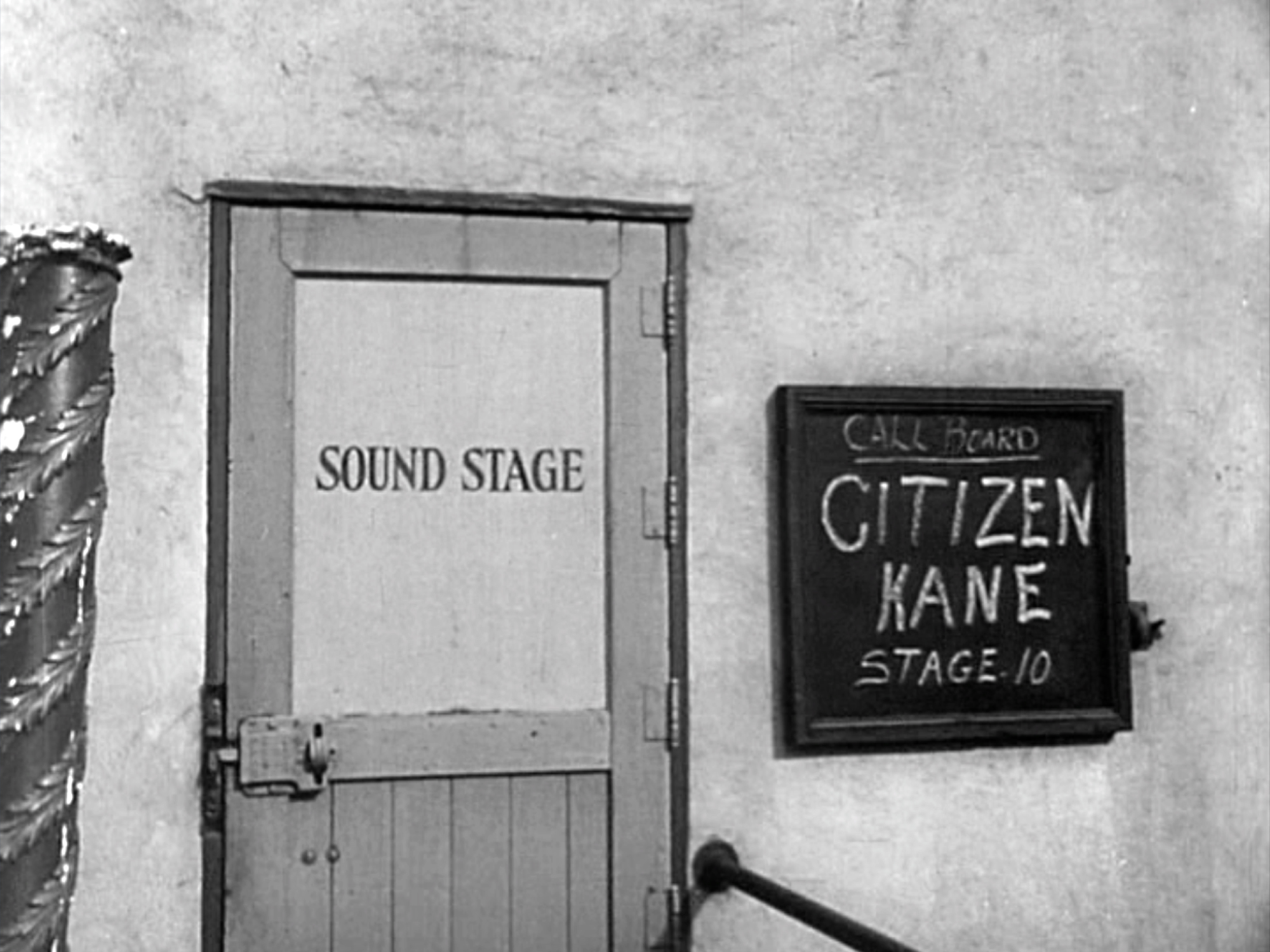
Sound stage entrance, as seen in the Citizen Kane trailer

Production advisor Miriam Geiger quickly compiled a handmade film textbook for Welles, a practical reference book of film techniques that he studied carefully. He then taught himself filmmaking by matching its visual vocabulary to The Cabinet of Dr. Caligari, which he ordered from the Museum of Modern Art, and films by Frank Capra, René Clair, Fritz Lang, King Vidor and Jean Renoir. The one film he genuinely studied was John Ford's Stagecoach, which he watched 40 times. "As it turned out, the first day I ever walked onto a set was my first day as a director," Welles said. "I'd learned whatever I knew in the projection room—from Ford. After dinner every night for about a month, I'd run Stagecoach, often with some different technician or department head from the studio, and ask questions. 'How was this done?' 'Why was this done?' It was like going to school."

Welles's cinematographer for the film was Gregg Toland, described by Welles as "just then, the number-one cameraman in the world." To Welles's astonishment, Toland visited him at his office and said, "I want you to use me on your picture." He had seen some of the Mercury stage productions (including Caesar) and said he wanted to work with someone who had never made a movie. RKO hired Toland on loan from Samuel Goldwyn Productions in the first week of June 1940.

"And he never tried to impress us that he was doing any miracles," Welles recalled. "I was calling for things only a beginner would have been ignorant enough to think anybody could ever do, and there he was, doing them." Toland later explained that he wanted to work with Welles because he anticipated the first-time director's inexperience and reputation for audacious experimentation in the theater would allow the cinematographer to try new and innovative camera techniques that typical Hollywood films would never have allowed him to do. Unaware of filmmaking protocol, Welles adjusted the lights on set as he was accustomed to doing in the theater; Toland quietly re-balanced them, and was angry when one of the crew informed Welles that he was infringing on Toland's responsibilities. During the first few weeks of June, Welles had lengthy discussions about the film with Toland and art director Perry Ferguson in the morning, and in the afternoon and evening he worked with actors and revised the script.

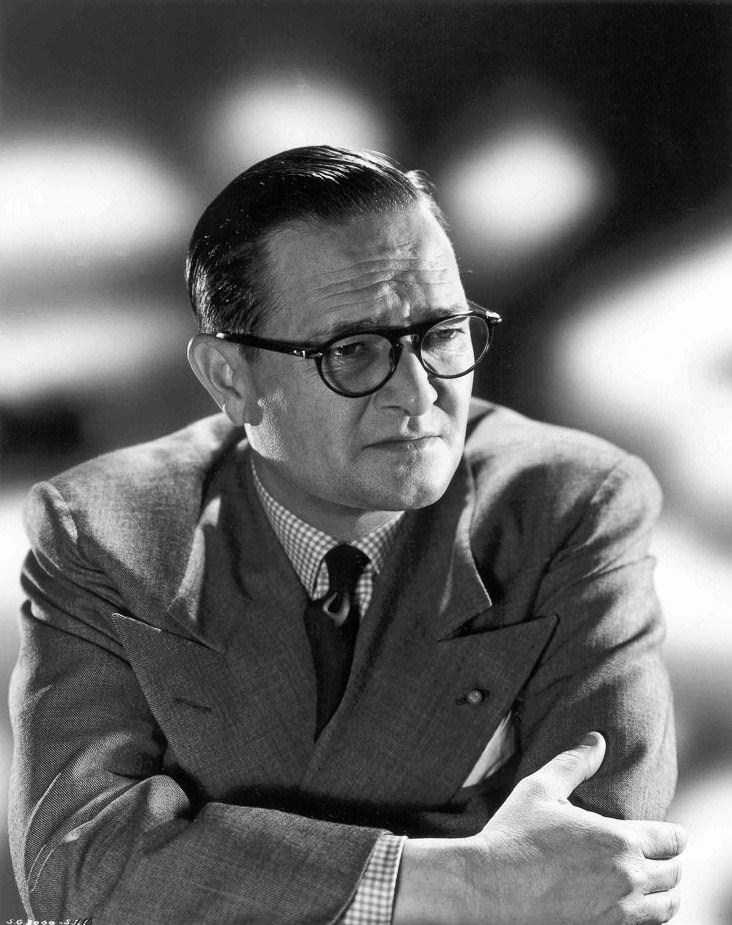
Cinematographer Gregg Toland wanted to work with Welles for the opportunity of trying experimental camera techniques that other films did not allow.

On June 29, 1940—a Saturday morning when few inquisitive studio executives would be around—Welles began filming Citizen Kane. After the disappointment of having Heart of Darkness canceled, Welles followed Ferguson's suggestion (Note: Speaking to Bogdanovich, Welles corrects himself when speaking about who suggested the "test" shooting: "That was Toland's idea—no, it was Ferguson's idea, the art director.") and deceived RKO into believing that he was simply shooting camera tests. "But we were shooting the picture," Welles said, "because we wanted to get started and be already into it before anybody knew about it."

At the time RKO executives were pressuring him to agree to direct a film called The Men from Mars, to capitalize on "The War of the Worlds" radio broadcast. Welles said that he would consider making the project but wanted to make a different film first. At this time he did not inform them that he had already begun filming Citizen Kane.

The early footage was called "Orson Welles Tests" on all paperwork. The first "test" shot was the News on the March projection room scene, economically filmed in a real studio projection room in darkness that masked many actors who appeared in other roles later in the film. (Note: "I used the whole Mercury cast, heavily disguised by darkness," Welles said. "And there they all are—if you look carefully, you can see them. Everybody in the movie is in it. ... Yes, I'm there.") "At $809 Orson did run substantially beyond the test budget of $528—to create one of the most famous scenes in movie history," wrote Barton Whaley.

The next scenes were the El Rancho nightclub scenes and the scene in which Susan attempts suicide. (Note: No figures can be found for the cost of filming Susan's attempted suicide, but filming the nightclub scene was budgeted at $1,038 and cost $1,376.79.) Welles later said that the nightclub set was available after another film had wrapped and that filming took 10 to 12 days to complete. For these scenes Welles had Comingore's throat sprayed with chemicals to give her voice a harsh, raspy tone. Other scenes shot in secret included those in which Thompson interviews Leland and Bernstein, which were also shot on sets built for other films.

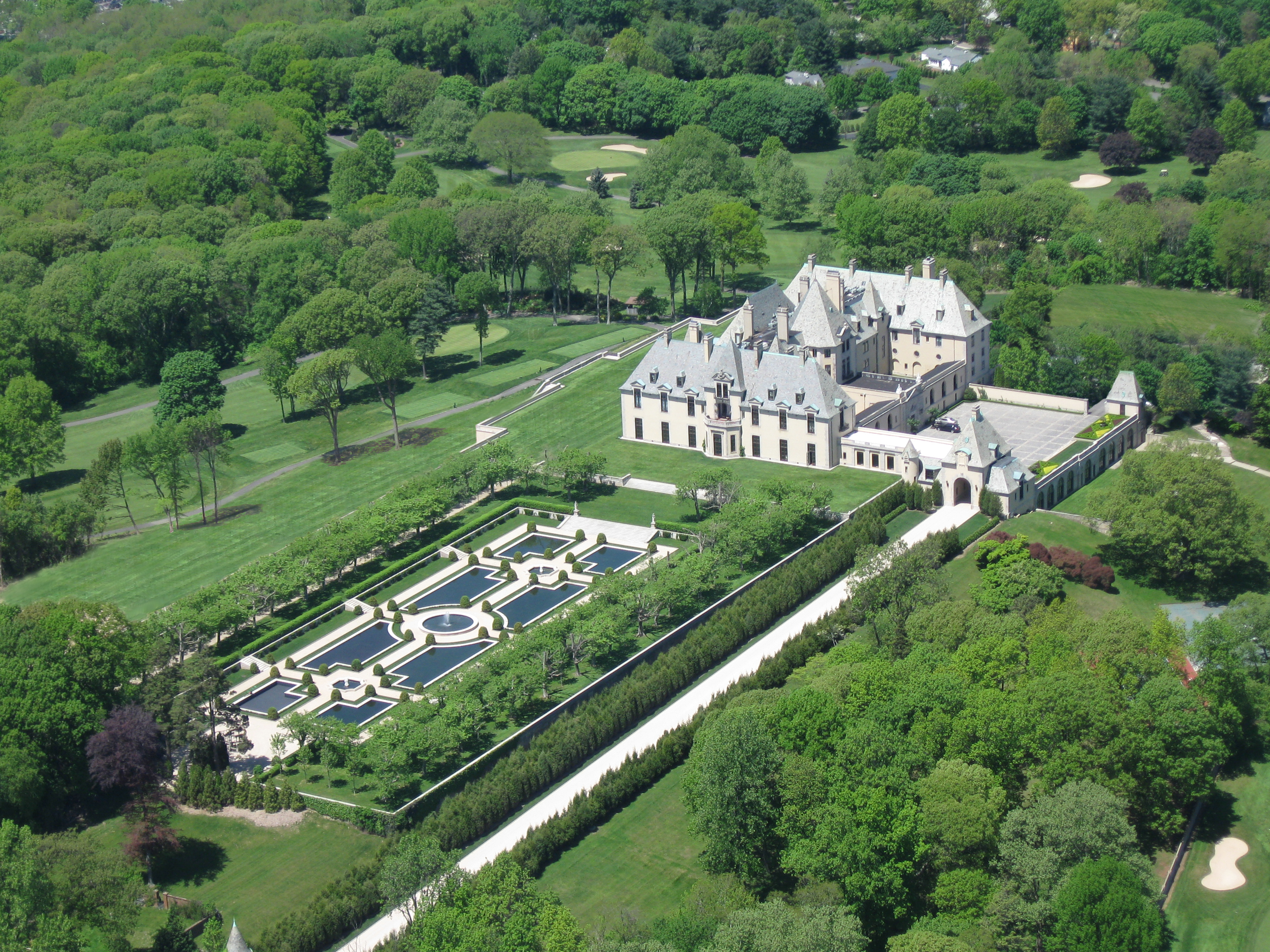
Aerial view of Otto Hermann Kahn's Oheka Castle that portrays the fictional Xanadu

During production, the film was referred to as RKO 281. Most of the filming took place in what is now Stage 19 on the Paramount Pictures lot in Hollywood. There was some location filming at Balboa Park in San Diego and the San Diego Zoo. Photographs of German-Jewish investment banker Otto Hermann Kahn's real-life estate Oheka Castle were used to portray the fictional Xanadu.

In the end of July, RKO approved the film and Welles was allowed to officially begin shooting, despite having already been filming "tests" for several weeks. Welles leaked stories to newspaper reporters that the "tests" had been so good that there was no need to re-shoot them. The first "official" scene to be shot was the breakfast montage sequence between Kane and his first wife Emily. To strategically save money and appease the RKO executives who opposed him, Welles rehearsed scenes extensively before actually shooting and filmed very few takes of each shot set-up. Welles never shot master shots for any scene after Toland told him that Ford never shot them. To appease the increasingly curious press, Welles threw a cocktail party for selected reporters, promising that they could watch a scene being filmed. When the journalists arrived Welles told them they had "just finished" shooting for the day but still had the party. Welles told the press that he was ahead of schedule (without factoring in the month of "test shooting"), thus discrediting claims that after a year in Hollywood without making a film he was a failure in the film industry.

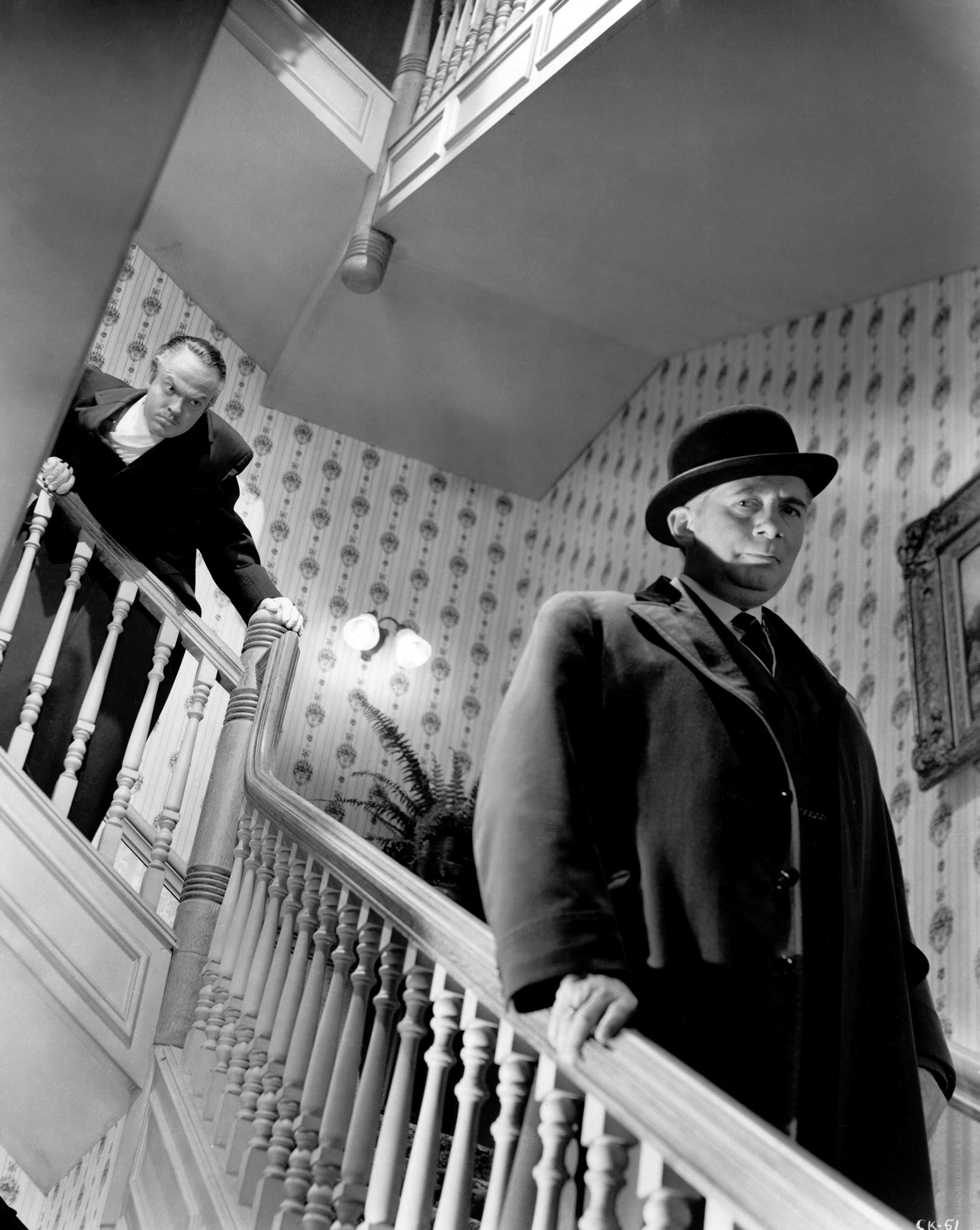
Welles fell ten feet (3.0 m) while shooting the scene in which Kane shouts at the departing Boss Jim W. Gettys; his injuries required him to direct from a wheelchair for two weeks.

Welles usually worked 16 to 18 hours a day on the film. He often began work at 4 a.m. since the special effects make-up used to age him for certain scenes took up to four hours to apply. Welles used this time to discuss the day's shooting with Toland and other crew members. The special contact lenses used to make Welles look elderly proved very painful, and a doctor was employed to place them into Welles's eyes. Welles had difficulty seeing clearly while wearing them, which caused him to badly cut his wrist when shooting the scene in which Kane breaks up the furniture in Susan's bedroom. While shooting the scene in which Kane shouts at Gettys on the stairs of Susan Alexander's apartment building, Welles fell ten feet; an X-ray revealed two bone chips in his ankle.

The injury required him to direct the film from a wheelchair for two weeks. He eventually wore a steel brace to resume performing on camera; it is visible in the low-angle scene between Kane and Leland after Kane loses the election. (Note: "It took nerve to shoot from down there, with that steel brace right in front of the camera, but I thought rightly that at that point they'd be looking at Leland and not at me.") For the final scene, a stage at the Selznick studio was equipped with a working furnace, and multiple takes were required to show the sled being put into the fire and the word "Rosebud" consumed. Paul Stewart recalled that on the ninth take the Culver City Fire Department arrived in full gear because the furnace had grown so hot the flue caught fire. "Orson was delighted with the commotion", he said.

When "Rosebud" was burned, Welles precisely choreographed every aspect of the scene while he had composer Bernard Herrmann's cue playing on the set.

Unlike Schaefer, many members of RKO's board of governors did not like Welles or the control that his contract gave him. However such board members as Nelson Rockefeller and NBC chief David Sarnoff were sympathetic to Welles. Throughout production Welles had problems with these executives not respecting his contract's stipulation of non-interference and several spies arrived on set to report what they saw to the executives. When the executives would sometimes arrive on set unannounced the entire cast and crew would suddenly start playing softball until they left. Before official shooting began the executives intercepted all copies of the script and delayed their delivery to Welles. They had one copy sent to their office in New York, resulting in it being leaked to press.

Principal shooting wrapped October 24. Welles then took several weeks away from the film for a lecture tour, during which he also scouted additional locations with Toland and Ferguson. Filming resumed November 15 with some re-shoots. Toland had to leave due to a commitment to shoot Howard Hughes' The Outlaw, but Toland's camera crew continued working on the film and Toland was replaced by RKO cinematographer Harry J. Wild. The final day of shooting on November 30 was Kane's death scene. Welles boasted that he only went 21 days over his official shooting schedule, without factoring in the month of "camera tests". According to RKO records, the film cost $839,727. Its estimated budget had been $723,800.

=== Post-production ===
Citizen Kane was edited by Robert Wise and assistant editor Mark Robson. Both would become successful film directors. Wise was hired after Welles finished shooting the "camera tests" and began officially making the film. Wise said that Welles "had an older editor assigned to him for those tests and evidently he was not too happy and asked to have somebody else. I was roughly Orson's age and had several good credits." Wise and Robson began editing the film while it was still shooting and said that they "could tell certainly that we were getting something very special. It was outstanding film day in and day out."

Welles gave Wise detailed instructions and was usually not present during the film's editing. The film was very well planned out and intentionally shot for such post-production techniques as slow dissolves. The lack of coverage made editing easy since Welles and Toland edited the film "in camera" by leaving few options of how it could be put together. Wise said the breakfast table sequence took weeks to edit and get the correct "timing" and "rhythm" for the whip pans and overlapping dialogue. The News on the March sequence was edited by RKO's newsreel division to give it authenticity. They used stock footage from Pathé News and the General Film Library.

During post-production Welles and special effects artist Linwood G. Dunn experimented with an optical printer to improve certain scenes that Welles found unsatisfactory from the footage. Whereas Welles was often immediately pleased with Wise's work, he would require Dunn and post-production audio engineer James G. Stewart to re-do their work several times until he was satisfied.

Welles hired Bernard Herrmann to compose the film's score. Where most Hollywood film scores were written quickly, in as few as two or three weeks after filming was completed, Herrmann was given 12 weeks to write the music. He had sufficient time to do his own orchestrations and conducting, and worked on the film reel by reel as it was shot and cut. He wrote complete musical pieces for some of the montages, and Welles edited many of the scenes to match their length.

== Style ==
Film scholars and historians view Citizen Kane as Welles's attempt to create a new style of filmmaking by studying various forms of it and combining them into one. However, Welles stated that his love for cinema began only when he started working on the film. When asked where he got the confidence as a first-time director to direct a film so radically different from contemporary cinema, he responded, "Ignorance, ignorance, sheer ignorance—you know there's no confidence to equal it. It's only when you know something about a profession, I think, that you're timid or careful."

David Bordwell wrote that "The best way to understand Citizen Kane is to stop worshipping it as a triumph of technique." Bordwell argues that the film did not invent any of its famous techniques such as deep focus cinematography, shots of the ceilings, chiaroscuro lighting and temporal jump-cuts, and that many of these stylistics had been used in German Expressionist films of the 1920s, such as The Cabinet of Dr. Caligari. But Bordwell asserts that the film did put them all together for the first time and perfected the medium in one single film. In a 1948 interview, D. W. Griffith said, "I loved Citizen Kane and particularly loved the ideas he took from me."

Arguments against the film's cinematic innovations were made as early as 1946 when French historian Georges Sadoul wrote, "The film is an encyclopedia of old techniques." He pointed out such examples as compositions that used both the foreground and the background in the films of Auguste and Louis Lumière, special effects used in the films of Georges Méliès, shots of the ceiling in Erich von Stroheim's Greed and newsreel montages in the films of Dziga Vertov.

French film critic André Bazin defended the film, writing, "In this respect, the accusation of plagiarism could very well be extended to the film's use of panchromatic film or its exploitation of the properties of gelatinous silver halide." Bazin disagreed with Sadoul's comparison to Lumière's cinematography since Citizen Kane used more sophisticated lenses, but acknowledged that it had similarities to such previous works as The Power and the Glory. Bazin stated that "even if Welles did not invent the cinematic devices employed in Citizen Kane, one should nevertheless credit him with the invention of their meaning." Bazin championed the techniques in the film for its depiction of heightened reality, but Bordwell believed that the film's use of special effects contradicted some of Bazin's theories.

=== Storytelling techniques ===
Citizen Kane rejects the traditional linear, chronological narrative and tells Kane's story entirely in flashbacks using different points of view, many of them from Kane's aged and forgetful associates, the cinematic equivalent of the unreliable narrator in literature. Welles also dispenses with the idea of a single storyteller and uses multiple narrators to recount Kane's life, a technique not used previously in Hollywood films. Each narrator recounts a different part of Kane's life, with each story overlapping another. The film depicts Kane as an enigma, a complicated man who leaves viewers with more questions than answers as to his character, such as the newsreel footage where he is attacked for being both a communist and a fascist.

The technique of flashbacks had been used in earlier films, notably The Power and the Glory (1933), but no film was as immersed in it as Citizen Kane. Thompson the reporter acts as a surrogate for the audience, questioning Kane's associates and piecing together his life.

Films typically had an "omniscient perspective" at the time, which Marilyn Fabe says give the audience the "illusion that we are looking with impunity into a world which is unaware of our gaze". Citizen Kane also begins in that fashion until the News on the March sequence, after which we the audience see the film through the perspectives of others. The News on the March sequence gives an overview of Kane's entire life (and the film's entire story) at the beginning of the film, leaving the audience without the typical suspense of wondering how it will end. Instead, the film's repetitions of events compels the audience to analyze and wonder why Kane's life happened the way that it did, under the pretext of finding out what "Rosebud" means. The film then returns to the omniscient perspective in the final scene, when only the audience discovers what "Rosebud" is.

=== Cinematography ===
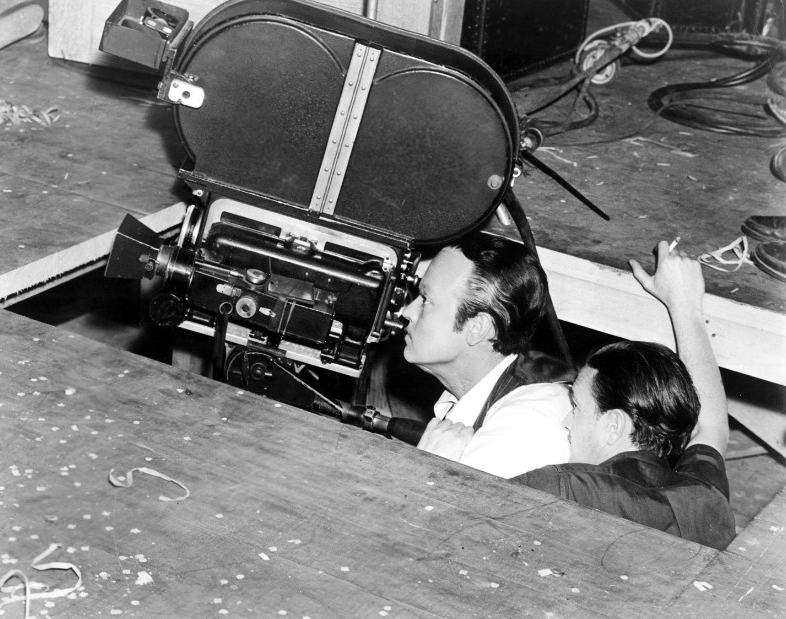
Welles and cinematographer Gregg Toland prepare to film the post-election confrontation between Kane and Leland, shot from an extremely low angle that required cutting into the set floor.

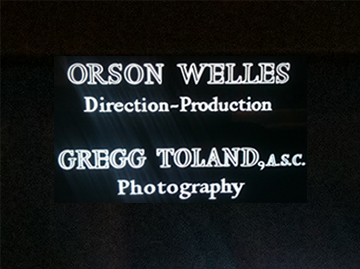
Welles placed Toland's credit with his own to acknowledge the cinematographer's contributions.

The most innovative technical aspect of Citizen Kane is the extended use of deep focus, where the foreground, background and everything in between are all in sharp focus. Cinematographer Toland did this through his experimentation with lenses and lighting. Toland described the achievement in an article for Theatre Arts magazine, made possible by the sensitivity of modern speed film:

New developments in the science of motion picture photography are not abundant at this advanced stage of the game but periodically one is perfected to make this a greater art. Of these I am in an excellent position to discuss what is termed "Pan-focus", as I have been active for two years in its development and used it for the first time in Citizen Kane. Through its use, it is possible to photograph action from a range of eighteen inches from the camera lens to over two hundred feet away, with extreme foreground and background figures and action both recorded in sharp relief. Hitherto, the camera had to be focused either for a close or a distant shot, all efforts to encompass both at the same time resulting in one or the other being out of focus. This handicap necessitated the breaking up of a scene into long and short angles, with much consequent loss of realism. With pan-focus, the camera, like the human eye, sees an entire panorama at once, with everything clear and lifelike.

Another unorthodox method used in the film was the low-angle shots facing upwards, thus allowing ceilings to be shown in the background of several scenes. Every set was built with a ceiling, which broke with studio convention, and many were constructed of fabric that concealed microphones. Welles felt that the camera should show what the eye sees, and that it was a bad theatrical convention to pretend that there was no ceiling—"a big lie in order to get all those terrible lights up there," he said. He became fascinated with the look of low angles, which made even dull interiors look interesting. One extremely low angle is used to photograph the encounter between Kane and Leland after Kane loses the election. A hole was dug for the camera, which required drilling into the concrete floor.

Welles credited Toland on the same title card as himself. "It's impossible to say how much I owe to Gregg," he said. "He was superb." He called Toland "the best director of photography that ever existed."

=== Sound ===
Citizen Kane's sound was recorded by Bailey Fesler and re-recorded in post-production by audio engineer James G. Stewart, both of whom had worked in radio. Stewart said that Hollywood films never deviated from a basic pattern of how sound could be recorded or used, but with Welles "deviation from the pattern was possible because he demanded it." Although the film is known for its complex soundtrack, much of the audio is heard as it was recorded by Fesler and without manipulation.

Welles used techniques from radio like overlapping dialogue. The scene in which characters sing "Oh, Mr. Kane" was especially complicated and required mixing several soundtracks together. He also used different "sound perspectives" to create the illusion of distances, such as in scenes at Xanadu where characters speak to each other at far distances. Welles experimented with sound in post-production, creating audio montages, and chose to create all of the sound effects for the film instead of using RKO's library of sound effects.

Welles used an aural technique from radio called the "lightning-mix". Welles used this technique to link complex montage sequences via a series of related sounds or phrases. For example, Kane grows from a child into a young man in just two shots. As Thatcher hands eight-year-old Kane a sled and wishes him a Merry Christmas, the sequence suddenly jumps to a shot of Thatcher fifteen years later, completing the sentence he began in both the previous shot and the chronological past. Other radio techniques include using a number of voices, each saying a sentence or sometimes merely a fragment of a sentence, and splicing the dialogue together in quick succession, such as the projection room scene. The film's sound cost $16,996, but was originally budgeted at $7,288.

Film critic and director François Truffaut wrote that "Before Kane, nobody in Hollywood knew how to set music properly in movies. Kane was the first, in fact the only, great film that uses radio techniques. ... A lot of filmmakers know enough to follow Auguste Renoir's advice to fill the eyes with images at all costs, but only Orson Welles understood that the sound track had to be filled in the same way." Cedric Belfrage of The Clipper wrote "of all of the delectable flavours that linger on the palate after seeing Kane, the use of sound is the strongest."

=== Make-up ===
The make-up for Citizen Kane was created and applied by Maurice Seiderman, a junior member of the RKO make-up department. He had not been accepted into the union, which recognized him as only an apprentice, but RKO nevertheless used him to make up principal actors. "Apprentices were not supposed to make up any principals, only extras, and an apprentice could not be on a set without a journeyman present," wrote make-up artist Dick Smith, who became friends with Seiderman in 1979. "During his years at RKO I suspect these rules were probably overlooked often." "Seiderman had gained a reputation as one of the most inventive and creatively precise up-and-coming makeup men in Hollywood," wrote biographer Frank Brady.

On an early tour of RKO, Welles met Seiderman in the small make-up lab that he created for himself in an unused dressing room. "Welles fastened on to him at once," wrote biographer Charles Higham, as Seiderman had developed his own makeup methods "that ensured complete naturalness of expression—a naturalness unrivaled in Hollywood." Seiderman developed a thorough plan for aging the principal characters, first making a plaster cast of the face of each of the actors who aged. He made a plaster mold of Welles's body down to the hips.

"My sculptural techniques for the characters' aging were handled by adding pieces of white modeling clay, which matched the plaster, onto the surface of each bust," Seiderman told Norman Gambill. When Seiderman achieved the desired effect, he cast the clay pieces in a soft plastic material that he formulated himself. These appliances were then placed onto the plaster bust and a four-piece mold was made for each phase of aging. The castings were then fully painted and paired with the appropriate wig for evaluation.

Before the actors went before the cameras each day, the pliable pieces were applied directly to their faces to recreate Seiderman's sculptural image. The facial surface was underpainted in a flexible red plastic compound; The red ground resulted in a warmth of tone that was picked up by the panchromatic film. Over that was applied liquid grease paint, and finally a colorless translucent talcum. Seiderman created the effect of skin pores on Kane's face by stippling the surface with a negative cast made from an orange peel.

Welles often arrived on the set at 2:30 am, as application of the sculptural make-up took 3½ hours for the oldest incarnation of Kane. The make-up included appliances to age Welles's shoulders, breast, and stomach. "In the film and production photographs, you can see that Kane had a belly that overhung," Seiderman said. "That was not a costume, it was the rubber sculpture that created the image. You could see how Kane's silk shirt clung wetly to the character's body. It could not have been done any other way."

Seiderman worked with Charles Wright on the wigs. These went over a flexible skull cover that Seiderman created and sewed into place with elastic thread. When he found the wigs too full, he untied one hair at a time to alter their shape. Kane's mustache was inserted into the makeup surface a few hairs at a time, to realistically vary the color and texture. He also made scleral lenses for Welles, Dorothy Comingore, George Coulouris, and Everett Sloane to dull the brightness of their young eyes. The lenses took a long time to fit properly, and Seiderman began work on them before devising any of the other makeup. "I painted them to age in phases, ending with the blood vessels and the arcus senilis of old age." Seiderman's tour de force was the breakfast montage, shot all in one day. "Twelve years, two years shot at each scene," he said.

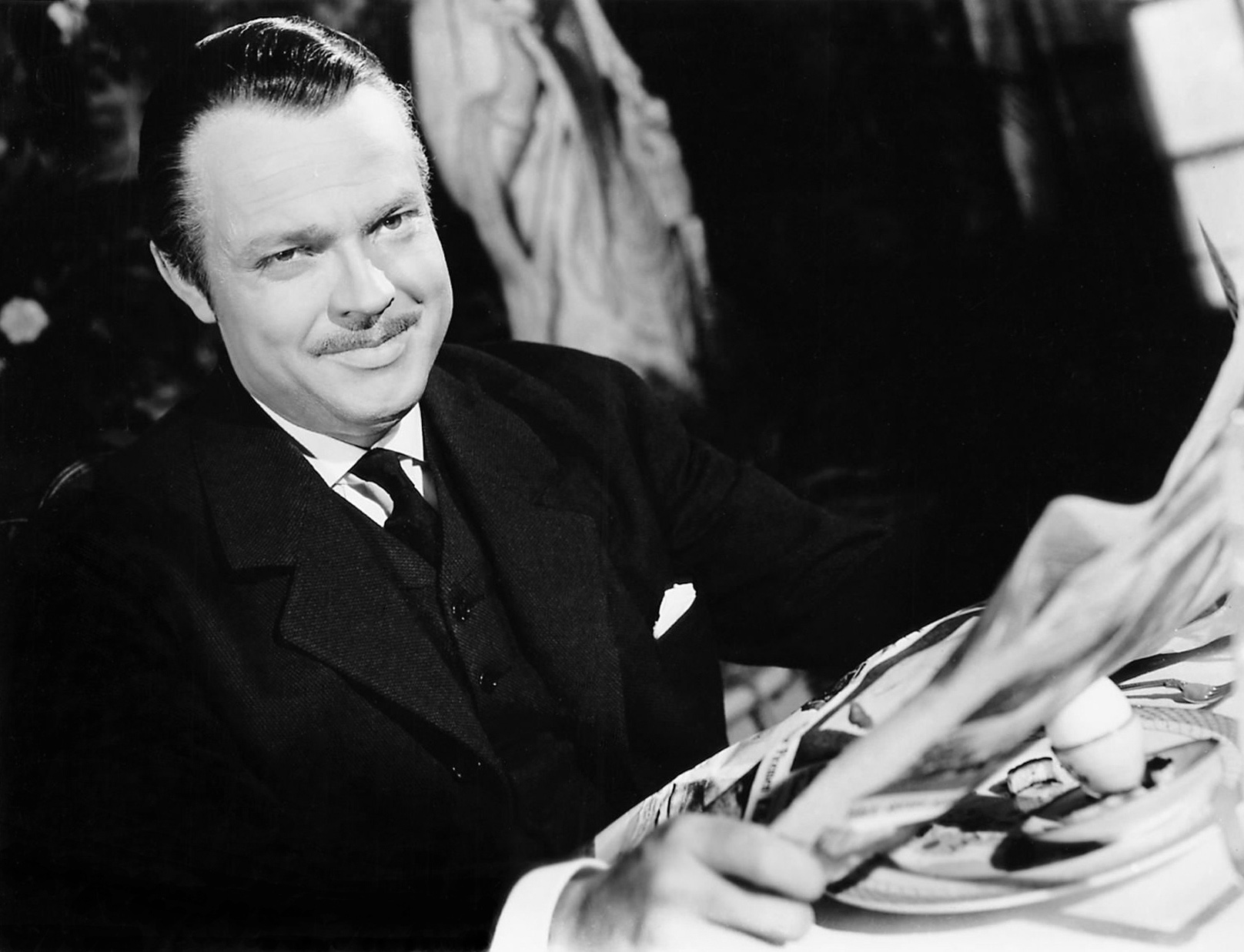
Kane ages convincingly in the breakfast montage, make-up artist Maurice Seiderman's tour de force

The major studios gave screen credit for make-up only to the department head. When RKO make-up department head Mel Berns refused to share credit with Seiderman, who was only an apprentice, Welles told Berns that there would be no make-up credit. Welles signed a large advertisement in the Los Angeles newspaper:

THANKS TO EVERYBODY WHO GETS SCREEN CREDIT FOR "CITIZEN KANE"
AND THANKS TO THOSE WHO DON'T
TO ALL THE ACTORS, THE CREW, THE OFFICE, THE MUSICIANS, EVERYBODY
AND PARTICULARLY TO MAURICE SEIDERMAN, THE BEST MAKE-UP MAN IN THE WORLD

=== Sets ===
Although credited as an assistant, the film's art direction was done by Perry Ferguson. Welles and Ferguson got along during their collaboration. In the weeks before production began Welles, Toland and Ferguson met regularly to discuss the film and plan every shot, set design and prop. Ferguson would take notes during these discussions and create rough designs of the sets and story boards for individual shots. After Welles approved the rough sketches, Ferguson made miniature models for Welles and Toland to experiment on with a periscope in order to rehearse and perfect each shot. Ferguson then had detailed drawings made for the set design, including the film's lighting design. The set design was an integral part of the film's overall look and Toland's cinematography.

In the original script the Great Hall at Xanadu was modeled after the Great Hall in Hearst Castle and its design included a mixture of Renaissance and Gothic styles. "The Hearstian element is brought out in the almost perverse juxtaposition of incongruous architectural styles and motifs," wrote Carringer. Before RKO cut the film's budget, Ferguson's designs were more elaborate and resembled the production designs of early Cecil B. DeMille films and Intolerance. The budget cuts reduced Ferguson's budget by 33 percent and his work cost $58,775 total, which was below average at that time.

To save costs Ferguson and Welles re-wrote scenes in Xanadu's living room and transported them to the Great Hall. A large staircase from another film was found and used at no additional cost. When asked about the limited budget, Ferguson said "Very often—as in that much-discussed 'Xanadu' set in Citizen Kane—we can make a foreground piece, a background piece, and imaginative lighting suggests a great deal more on the screen than actually exists on the stage." According to the film's official budget there were 81 sets built, but Ferguson said there were between 106 and 116.

Still photographs of Oheka Castle in Huntington, New York, were used in the opening montage, representing Kane's Xanadu estate. Ferguson also designed statues from Kane's collection with styles ranging from Greek to German Gothic. The sets were also built to accommodate Toland's camera movements. Walls were built to fold and furniture could quickly be moved. The film's famous ceilings were made out of muslin fabric and camera boxes were built into the floors for low angle shots. Welles later said that he was proud that the film production value looked much more expensive than the film's budget. Although neither worked with Welles again, Toland and Ferguson collaborated in several films in the 1940s.

=== Special effects ===
The film's special effects were supervised by RKO department head Vernon L. Walker. Welles pioneered several visual effects to cheaply shoot things like crowd scenes and large interior spaces. For example, the scene in which the camera in the opera house rises dramatically to the rafters, to show the workmen showing a lack of appreciation for Susan Alexander Kane's performance, was shot by a camera craning upwards over the performance scene, then a curtain wipe to a miniature of the upper regions of the house, and then another curtain wipe matching it again with the scene of the workmen. Other scenes effectively employed miniatures to make the film look much more expensive than it truly was, such as various shots of Xanadu.

Some shots included rear screen projection in the background, such as Thompson's interview of Leland and some of the ocean backgrounds at Xanadu. Bordwell claims that the scene where Thatcher agrees to be Kane's guardian used rear screen projection to depict young Kane in the background, despite this scene being cited as a prime example of Toland's deep focus cinematography. A special effects camera crew from Walker's department was required for the extreme close-up shots such as Kane's lips when he says "Rosebud" and the shot of the typewriter typing Susan's bad review.

Optical effects artist Dunn claimed that "up to 80 percent of some reels was optically printed." These shots were traditionally attributed to Toland for years. The optical printer improved some of the deep focus shots. One problem with the optical printer was that it sometimes created excessive graininess, such as the optical zoom out of the snow globe. Welles decided to superimpose snow falling to mask the graininess in these shots. Toland said that he disliked the results of the optical printer, but acknowledged that "RKO special effects expert Vernon Walker, ASC, and his staff handled their part of the production—a by no means inconsiderable assignment—with ability and fine understanding."

Any time deep focus was impossible—as in the scene in which Kane finishes a negative review of Susan's opera while at the same time firing the person who began writing the review—an optical printer was used to make the whole screen appear in focus, visually layering one piece of film onto another. However, some apparently deep-focus shots were the result of in-camera effects, as in the famous scene in which Kane breaks into Susan's room after her suicide attempt. In the background, Kane and another man break into the room, while simultaneously the medicine bottle and a glass with a spoon in it are in closeup in the foreground. The shot was an in-camera matte shot. The foreground was shot first, with the background dark. Then the background was lit, the foreground darkened, the film rewound, and the scene re-shot with the background action.

=== Music ===
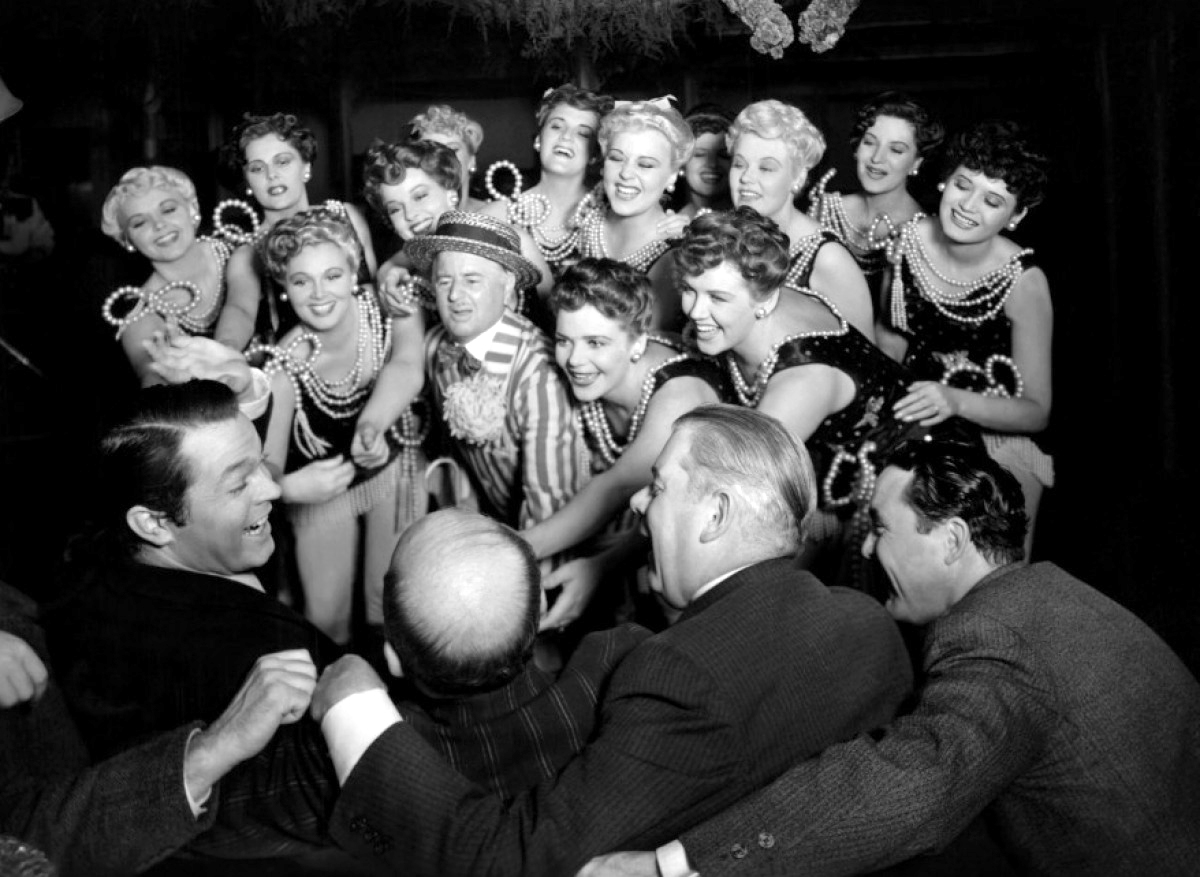
Incidental music includes the publisher's theme, "Oh, Mr. Kane", a tune by Pepe Guízar with special lyrics by Herman Ruby.

Kane was the first film scored by Bernard Herrmann, who had composed for Welles's Mercury Theatre on the Air. Because it was Herrmann's first film score, RKO wanted to pay him only a small fee, but Welles insisted he be paid at the same rate as Max Steiner.

Herrmann drew on radio techniques for his score: "The movies frequently overlook opportunities for musical cues that last only a few seconds—that is, from five to fifteen seconds at the most—the reason being that the eye usually covers this transition. On the other hand, in radio drama, every scene must be bridged by some sort of sound device, so that even five seconds of music becomes a vital instrument in telling the ear the scene is shifting. I felt that in this film, where photographic contrasts were often so sharp and sudden, a brief cue—even two or three chords—might heighten the effect immeasurably ... Sound effects were often blended in Citizen Kane, with the music, to add intensity to certain scenes. This was also a carry-over from radio technique."

The score established Herrmann as an important new film composer and eschewed the typical Hollywood practice of scoring a film with virtually non-stop music. Instead Herrmann used what he later described as "radio scoring", musical cues typically 5–15 seconds in length that bridge the action or suggest a different emotional response. The breakfast montage sequence begins with a graceful waltz theme and gets darker with each variation on that theme as the passage of time leads to the hardening of Kane's personality and the breakdown of his first marriage.

Herrmann realized that musicians slated to play his music were hired for individual unique sessions; there was no need to write for existing ensembles. This meant that he was free to score for unusual combinations of instruments, even instruments that are not commonly heard. In the opening sequence, for example, the tour of Kane's estate Xanadu, Herrmann introduces a recurring leitmotif played by low woodwinds, including a quartet of alto flutes.

For Susan Alexander Kane's operatic sequence, Welles suggested that Herrmann compose a witty parody of a Mary Garden vehicle, an aria from Salammbô. "Our problem was to create something that would give the audience the feeling of the quicksand into which this simple little girl, having a charming but small voice, is suddenly thrown," Herrmann said. Writing in the style of a 19th-century French Oriental opera, Herrmann put the aria in a key that would force the singer to strain to reach the high notes, culminating in a high D, well outside the range of Susan Alexander. Soprano Jean Forward dubbed the vocal part for Comingore. Houseman claimed to have written the libretto, based on Jean Racine's Athalie and Phedre, although some confusion remains since Lucille Fletcher remembered preparing the lyrics. Fletcher, then Herrmann's wife, wrote the libretto for his opera Wuthering Heights.

Music enthusiasts consider the scene in which Susan Alexander Kane attempts to sing the famous cavatina "Una voce poco fa" from Il barbiere di Siviglia by Gioachino Rossini with vocal coach Signor Matiste as especially memorable for depicting the horrors of learning music through mistakes.

Some incidental music came from other sources. Welles heard the tune used for the publisher's theme, "Oh, Mr. Kane", in Mexico. Called "A Poco No", the song was written by Pepe Guízar and special lyrics were written by Herman Ruby. "In a Mizz", a 1939 jazz song by Charlie Barnet and Haven Johnson, bookends Thompson's second interview of Susan Alexander Kane. "I kind of based the whole scene around that song," Welles said. "The music is by Nat Cole—it's his trio." Later—beginning with the lyrics, "It can't be love"—"In a Mizz" is performed at the Everglades picnic, framing the fight in the tent between Susan and Kane. Musicians including bandleader Cee Pee Johnson (drums), Alton Redd (vocals), Raymond Tate (trumpet), Buddy Collette (alto sax) and Buddy Banks (tenor sax) are featured. All of the music used in the newsreel came from the RKO music library, edited at Welles's request by the newsreel department to achieve what Herrmann called "their own crazy way of cutting". The News on the March theme that accompanies the newsreel titles is "Belgian March" by Anthony Collins, from the film Nurse Edith Cavell. Other examples are an excerpt from Alfred Newman's score for Gunga Din (the exploration of Xanadu), Roy Webb's theme for Reno (the growth of Kane's empire), and bits of Webb's score for Five Came Back (introducing Walter Parks Thatcher).

Herrmann concluded that "two full weeks were spent in the dubbing room, and music under our supervision was often re-recorded six or seven times before the proper dynamic level was achieved. The result is an exact projection of the original musical ideas in the score. Technically, no composer could ask for more."

Herrmann explained his use of motifs:

I am not a great believer in the leitmotiv as a device for motion picture music—but in this film its use was practically imperative, because of the story itself and the manner in which it is unfolded.

There are two main motifs. One—a simple four-note figure in the brass—is that of Kane's power. It is given out in the first two bars of the film. The second motif is that of Rosebud. Heard as a solo in the vibraphone, it first appears in the death scene at the very beginning of the picture. It is heard again and again throughout the film in various guises, and if followed closely, is a clue to the ultimate identity of Rosebud itself.

The motif of power is also transformed, becoming a vigorous piece of ragtime, a hornpipe polka and, at the end of the picture, a commentary on Kane's life.

In 1972, Herrmann said, "I was fortunate to start my career with a film like Citizen Kane, it's been a downhill run ever since!" Welles loved Herrmann's score and told director Henry Jaglom that it was 50 percent responsible for the film's artistic success.

=== Editing ===
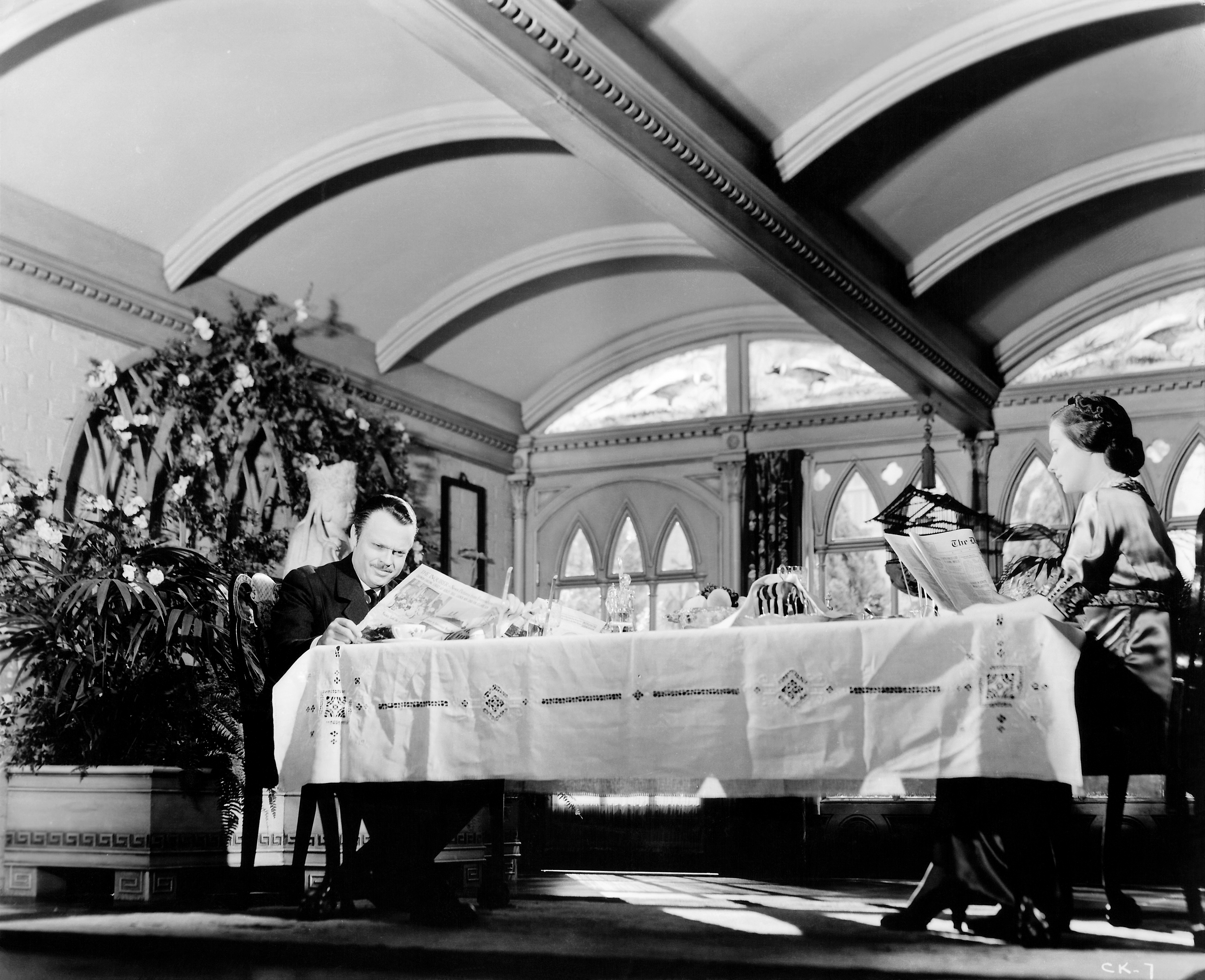
Orson Welles and Ruth Warrick in the breakfast montage

One of the editing techniques used in Citizen Kane was the use of montage to collapse time and space, using an episodic sequence on the same set while the characters changed costume and make-up between cuts so that the scene following each cut would look as if it took place in the same location, but at a time long after the previous cut. In the breakfast montage, Welles chronicles the breakdown of Kane's first marriage in five vignettes that condense 16 years of story time into two minutes of screen time. Welles said that the idea for the breakfast scene "was stolen from The Long Christmas Dinner by Thornton Wilder ... a one-act play, which is a long Christmas dinner that takes you through something like 60 years of a family's life." The film often uses long dissolves to signify the passage of time and its psychological effect of the characters, such as the scene in which the abandoned sled is covered with snow after the young Kane is sent away with Thatcher.

Welles was influenced by the editing theories of Sergei Eisenstein by using jarring cuts that caused "sudden graphic or associative contrasts", such as the cut from Kane's deathbed to the beginning of the News on the March sequence and a sudden shot of a shrieking cockatoo at the beginning of Raymond's flashback. Although the film typically favors mise-en-scène over montage, the scene in which Kane goes to Susan Alexander's apartment after first meeting her is the only one that is primarily cut as close-ups with shots and counter shots between Kane and Susan. Fabe says that "by using a standard Hollywood technique sparingly, [Welles] revitalizes its psychological expressiveness."

== Sources ==
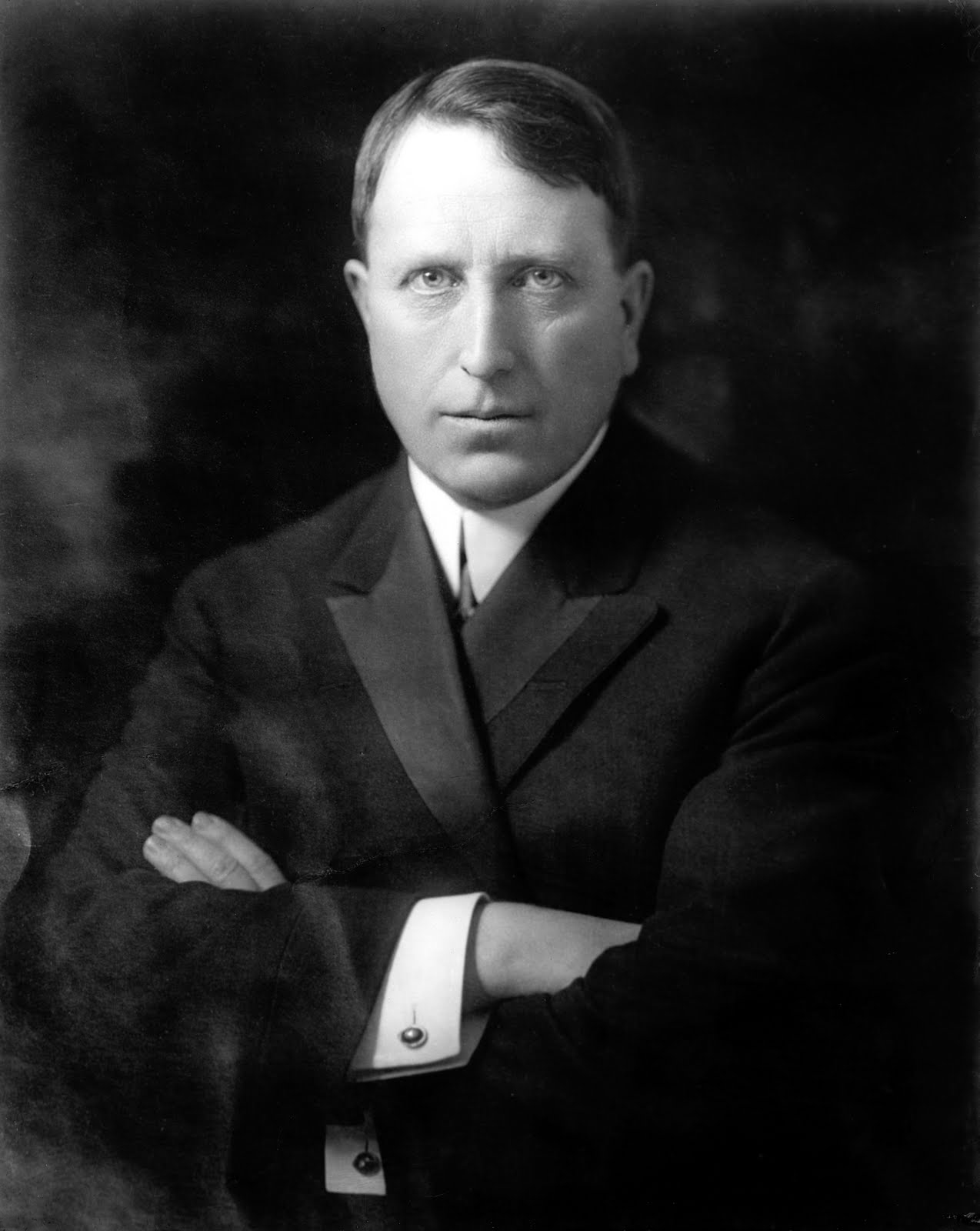
Although various sources were used as a model for Kane, William Randolph Hearst was the primary inspiration.

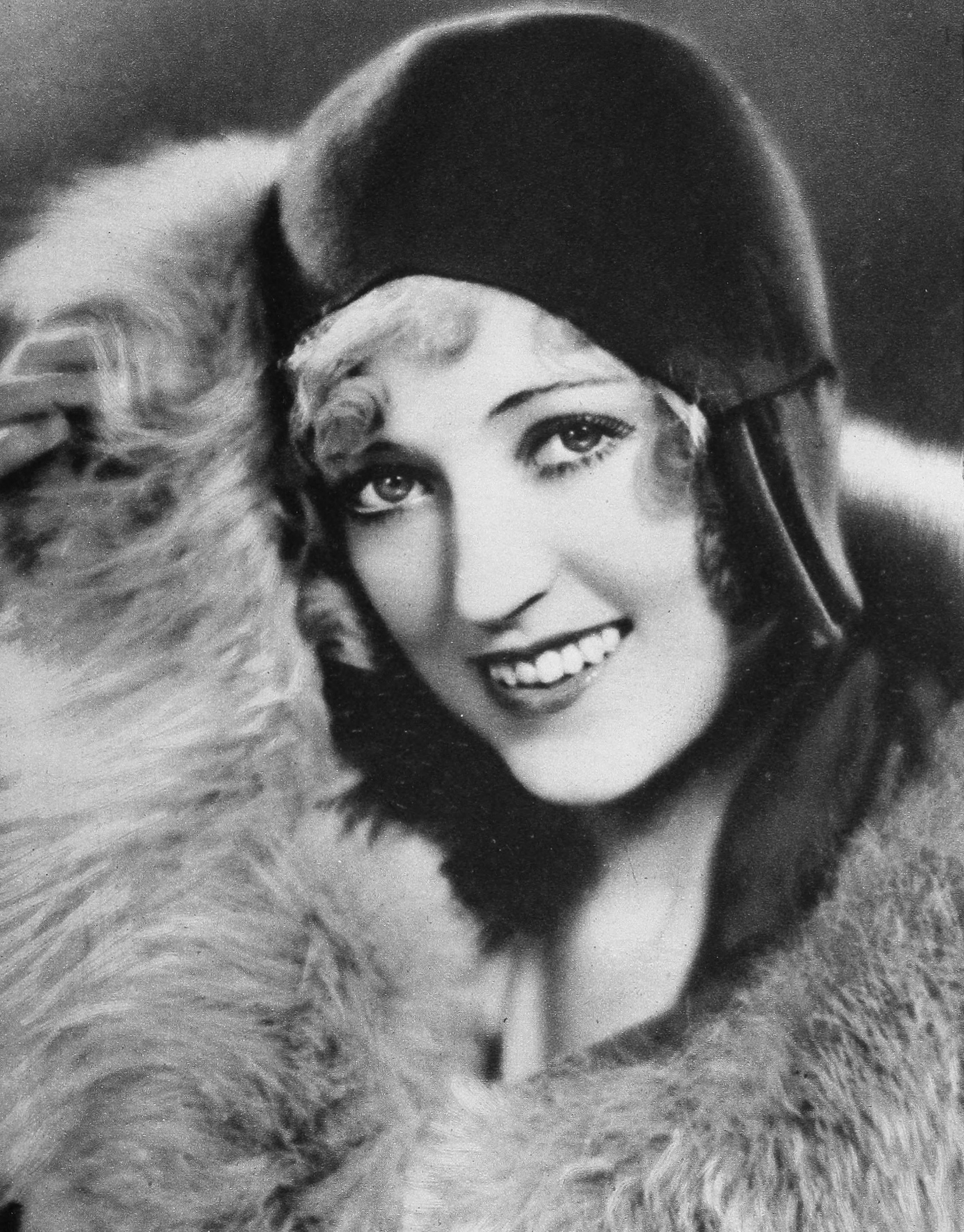
Hearst was disturbed by the film's supposed depiction of Marion Davies, but Welles always denied that Susan Alexander Kane was based on Davies.

Welles never confirmed a principal source for the character of Charles Foster Kane. Houseman wrote that Kane is a synthesis of different personalities, with Hearst's life used as the main source. Some events and details were invented, and Houseman wrote that he and Mankiewicz also "grafted anecdotes from other giants of journalism, including Pulitzer, Northcliffe and Mank's first boss, Herbert Bayard Swope". Welles said, "Mr. Hearst was quite a bit like Kane, although Kane isn't really founded on Hearst in particular. Many people sat for it, so to speak." He specifically acknowledged that aspects of Kane were drawn from the lives of two business tycoons familiar from his youth in Chicago—Samuel Insull and Harold Fowler McCormick. (Note: Welles states, "There's all that stuff about McCormick and the opera. I drew a lot from that from my Chicago days. And Samuel Insull." A known supporter of President Roosevelt, the fact that both McCormick and Hearst were opposed to FDR's successful attempts to control radio and moderate control of print may have been an incentive for Welles to use his film as a smear against both men.)

The character of Jedediah Leland was based on drama critic Ashton Stevens, George Stevens's uncle and Welles's close boyhood friend. Some detail came from Mankiewicz's own experience as a drama critic in New York.

Many assumed that the character of Susan Alexander Kane was based on Marion Davies, Hearst's mistress whose career he managed. This assumption was a major reason Hearst tried to destroy Citizen Kane. (Note: Charlie Lederer insisted that Hearst and Davies never saw Citizen Kane and condemned it based on the outrage of trusted friends, wrote his stepdaughter (and Welles's daughter) Chris Welles Feder. "In Charlie's view, Hearst was more distressed by the movie's insinuation ... that Marion was a failed and pathetic alcoholic that he was by any unflattering references to himself.") Welles denied that the character was based on Davies, whom he called "an extraordinary woman—nothing like the character Dorothy Comingore played in the movie". He cited Insull's building of the Chicago Opera House, and McCormick's lavish promotion of the opera career of his second wife, Ganna Walska, as direct influences on the screenplay.

The character of political boss Jim W. Gettys is based on Charles F. Murphy, a leader in New York City's infamous Tammany Hall political machine.

Welles credited "Rosebud" to Mankiewicz. Biographer Richard Meryman wrote that the symbol of Mankiewicz's own damaged childhood was a treasured bicycle, stolen while he visited the public library and not replaced by his family as punishment. He regarded it as the prototype of Charles Foster Kane's sled. In his 2015 Welles biography, Patrick McGilligan reported that Mankiewicz himself stated that the word "Rosebud" was taken from the name of a famous racehorse, Old Rosebud. Mankiewicz had a bet on the horse in the 1914 Kentucky Derby, which he won, and McGilligan wrote that "Old Rosebud symbolized his lost youth, and the break with his family". In testimony for a copyright infringement suit brought by Hearst biographer Ferdinand Lundberg, Mankiewicz said, "I had undergone psycho-analysis, and Rosebud, under circumstances slightly resembling the circumstances in [Citizen Kane], played a prominent part." Gore Vidal has argued in The New York Review of Books that "Rosebud was what Hearst called his friend Marion Davies's clitoris".

The News on the March sequence that begins the film satirizes the journalistic style of The March of Time, the news documentary and dramatization series presented in movie theaters by Time Inc. From 1935 to 1938 Welles was a member of the uncredited company of actors that presented the original radio version.

Houseman claimed that banker Walter P. Thatcher was loosely based on J. P. Morgan. Bernstein was named for Dr. Maurice Bernstein, appointed Welles's guardian; Sloane's portrayal was said to be based on Bernard Herrmann. Herbert Carter, editor of The Inquirer, was named for actor Jack Carter.

== Political themes ==
Laura Mulvey explored the anti-fascist themes of Citizen Kane in her 1992 monograph for the British Film Institute. The News on the March newsreel presents Kane keeping company with Hitler and other dictators while he smugly assures the public that there will be no war. She wrote that the film reflects "the battle between intervention and isolationism" then being waged in the United States; the film was released six months before the attack on Pearl Harbor, while President Franklin D. Roosevelt was laboring to win public opinion for entering World War II. "In the rhetoric of Citizen Kane," Mulvey writes, "the destiny of isolationism is realised in metaphor: in Kane's own fate, dying wealthy and lonely, surrounded by the detritus of European culture and history."

Journalist Ignacio Ramonet has cited the film as an early example of mass media manipulation of public opinion and the power that media conglomerates have on influencing the democratic process. He believes that this early example of a media mogul influencing politics is outdated and that today "there are media groups with the power of a thousand Citizen Kanes." Media mogul Rupert Murdoch is sometimes labeled as a latter-day Citizen Kane.

Comparisons have also been made between the career and character of Donald Trump and Charles Foster Kane. Citizen Kane is reported to be one of Trump's favorite films, and his biographer Tim O'Brien has said that Trump is fascinated by and identifies with Kane.

== Pre-release controversy ==
To ensure that Hearst's life's influence on Citizen Kane was a secret, Welles limited access to dailies and managed the film's publicity. A December 1940 feature story in Stage magazine compared the film's narrative to Faust and made no mention of Hearst.

The film was scheduled to premiere at RKO's flagship theater Radio City Music Hall on February 14, but in early January 1941 Welles was not finished with post-production work and told RKO that it still needed its musical score. Writers for national magazines had early deadlines and so a rough cut was previewed for a select few on January 3, 1941 for such magazines as Life, Look and Redbook. Gossip columnist Hedda Hopper (an arch-rival of Louella Parsons, the Hollywood correspondent for Hearst papers) showed up to the screening uninvited. Most of the critics at the preview said that they liked the film and gave it good advanced reviews. Hopper wrote negatively about it, calling the film a "vicious and irresponsible attack on a great man" and criticizing its corny writing and old fashioned photography.

Friday magazine ran an article drawing point-by-point comparisons between Kane and Hearst and documented how Welles had led on Parsons. Up until this Welles had been friendly with Parsons. The magazine quoted Welles as saying that he could not understand why she was so nice to him and that she should "wait until the woman finds out that the picture's about her boss." Welles immediately denied making the statement and the editor of Friday admitted that it might be false. Welles apologized to Parsons and assured her that he had never made that remark.

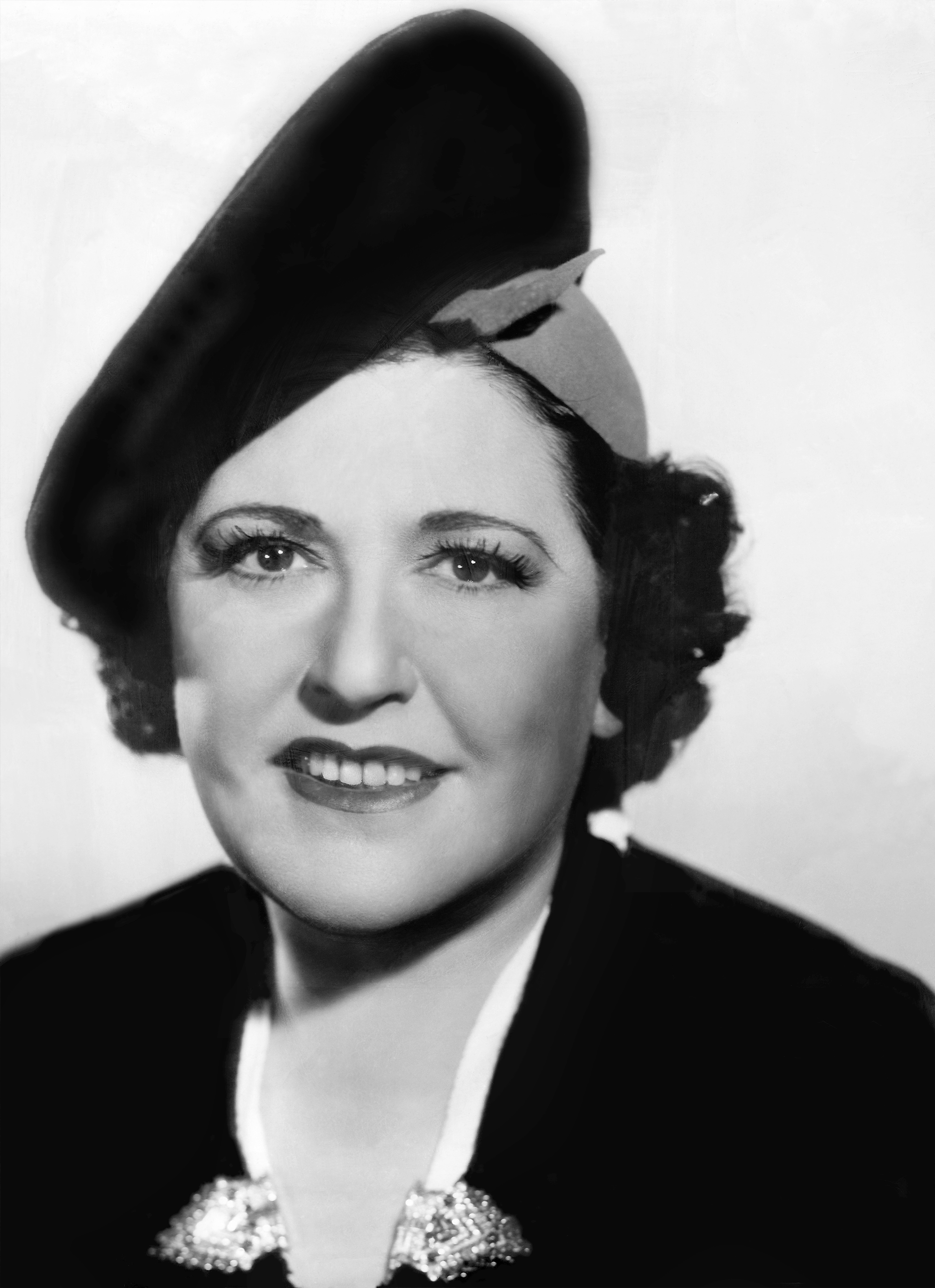
Film columnist and Hearst employee Louella Parsons was humiliated by Citizen Kane and made numerous threats to prevent the film's release.

Shortly after Friday's article, Hearst sent Parsons an angry letter complaining that he had learned about Citizen Kane from Hopper and not her. The incident made a fool of Parsons and compelled her to start attacking Welles and the film. Parsons demanded a private screening of the film and personally threatened Schaefer on Hearst's behalf, first with a lawsuit and then with a vague threat of consequences for everyone in Hollywood. On January 10 Parsons and two lawyers working for Hearst were given a private screening of the film. James G. Stewart was present at the screening and said that she walked out of the film.

Soon after, Parsons called Schaefer and threatened RKO with a lawsuit if they released Kane. She also contacted the management of Radio City Music Hall and demanded that they should not screen it. The next day, the front page headline in Daily Variety read, "HEARST BANS RKO FROM PAPERS." Hearst began this ban by suppressing promotion of RKO's Kitty Foyle, but in two weeks the ban was lifted for everything except Kane.

When Schaefer did not submit to Parsons she called other studio heads and made more threats on behalf of Hearst to expose the private lives of people throughout the entire film industry. Welles was then threatened with an exposé about his romance with the married actress Dolores del Río, who wanted the affair kept secret until her divorce was finalized. In a statement to journalists Welles denied that the film was about Hearst. Hearst began preparing an injunction against the film for libel and invasion of privacy, but Welles's lawyer told him that he doubted Hearst would proceed due to the negative publicity and required testimony that an injunction would bring.

The Hollywood Reporter ran a front-page story on January 13 that Hearst papers were about to run a series of editorials attacking Hollywood's practice of hiring refugees and immigrants for jobs that could be done by Americans. The goal was to put pressure on the other studios to force RKO to shelve Kane. Many of those immigrants had fled Europe after the rise of fascism and feared losing the haven of the United States. Soon afterwards, Schaefer was approached by Nicholas Schenck, head of Metro-Goldwyn-Mayer's parent company, with an offer on the behalf of Louis B. Mayer and other Hollywood executives to RKO Pictures of $805,000 to destroy all prints of the film and burn the negative.

Once RKO's legal team reassured Schaefer, the studio announced on January 21 that Kane would be released as scheduled, and with one of the largest promotional campaigns in the studio's history. Schaefer brought Welles to New York City for a private screening of the film with the New York corporate heads of the studios and their lawyers. There was no objection to its release provided that certain changes, including the removal or softening of specific references that might offend Hearst, were made. Welles agreed and cut the running time from 122 minutes to 119 minutes. The cuts satisfied the corporate lawyers.

== Trailer ==
The film's trailer

The trailer contains the only existing behind-the-scenes footage of the film: Welles narrates a tour around the film set, introduces the principal cast members, and offers a brief overview of Kane's character.

While Citizen Kane is frequently cited as a groundbreaking, influential film, Simon Callow argues its trailer was no less original in its approach. Callow writes that it has "great playful charm ... it is a miniature documentary, almost an introduction to the cinema ... Teasing, charming, completely original, it is a sort of conjuring trick: Without his face appearing once on the screen, Welles entirely dominates its five [sic] minutes' duration."

== Release ==
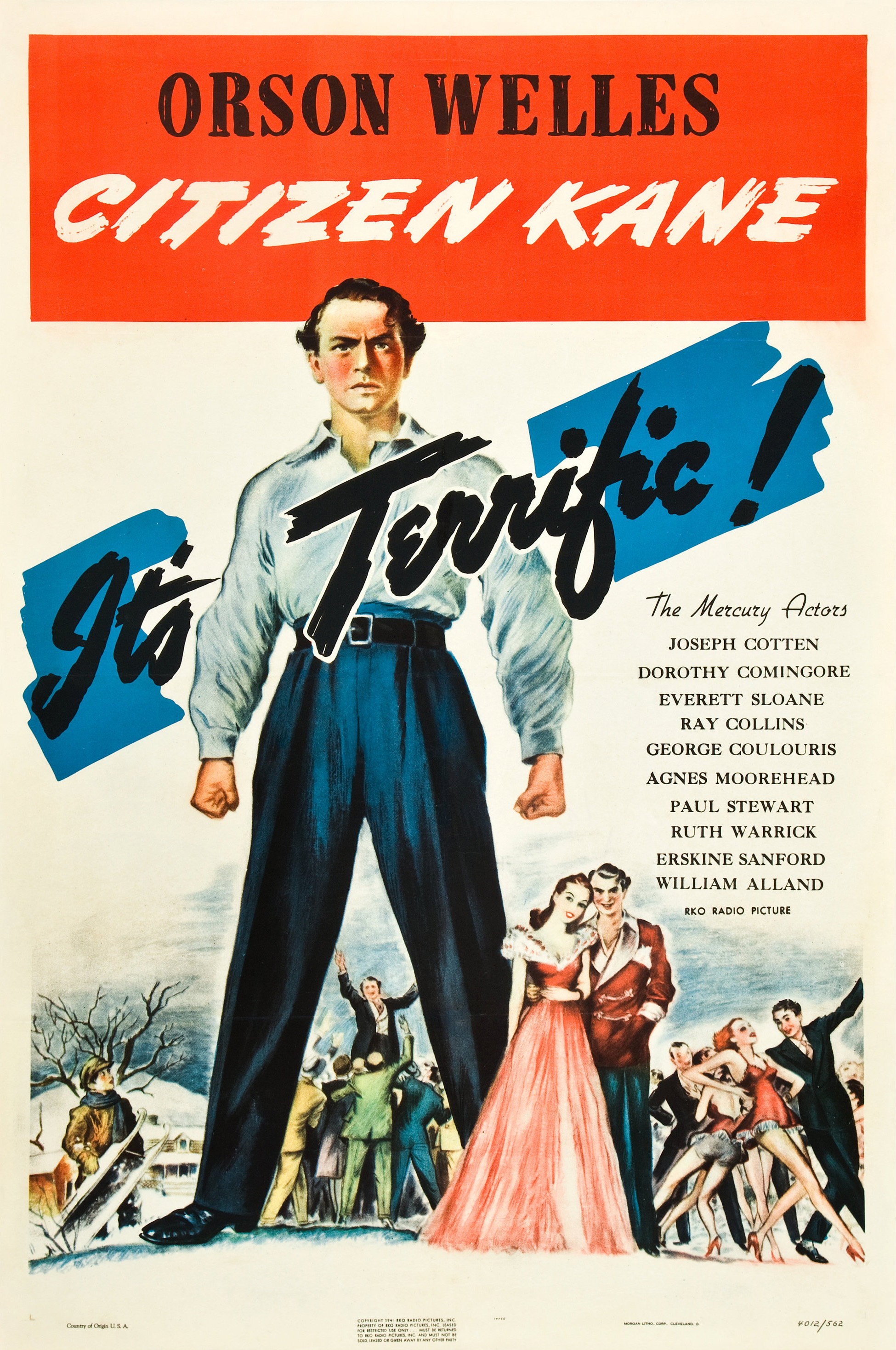
Theatrical release poster (Style A)

Radio City Music Hall's management refused to screen Citizen Kane for its premiere. A possible factor was Parsons's threat that The American Weekly would run a defamatory story on the grandfather of major RKO stockholder Nelson Rockefeller. Other exhibitors feared being sued for libel by Hearst and refused to show the film. In March, Welles threatened the RKO board of governors with a lawsuit if they did not release the film. Schaefer stood by Welles and opposed the board of governors. When RKO still delayed the film's release Welles offered to buy the film for $1 million and the studio finally agreed to release the film on May 1.

Schaefer managed to book a few theaters willing to show the film. Hearst papers refused to accept advertising. RKO's publicity advertisements for the film erroneously promoted it as a love story.

Kane opened at the RKO Palace Theatre on Broadway in New York on May 1, 1941, in Chicago on May 6, and in Los Angeles on May 8. Welles said that at the Chicago premiere that he attended the theater was almost empty.

=== Contemporary response ===
Reviews fell into three categories: highly positive, mixed, and negative. The day following the premiere of Citizen Kane, The New York Times critic Bosley Crowther wrote that "it comes close to being the most sensational film ever made in Hollywood... Count on Mr. Welles: he doesn't do things by halves. ... Upon the screen he discovered an area large enough for his expansive whims to have free play. And the consequence is that he has made a picture of tremendous and overpowering scope, not in physical extent so much as in its rapid and graphic rotation of thoughts. Mr. Welles has put upon the screen a motion picture that really moves". Cecilia Ager, reviewing it in PM, wrote, "Seeing it, it's as if you never really saw a movie before."

The Washington Post called it "one of the most important films in the history" of filmmaking. The Washington Evening Star said Welles was a genius who created "a superbly dramatic biography of another genius" and "a picture that is revolutionary". New York Daily News critic Kate Cameron called it "one of the most interesting and technically superior films that has ever come out of a Hollywood studio". New York World-Telegram critic William Boehnel said that the film was "staggering and belongs at once among the greatest screen achievements". Time magazine wrote that "it has found important new techniques in picture-making and story-telling." Life magazine's review said that "few movies have ever come from Hollywood with such powerful narrative, such original technique, such exciting photography." John C. Mosher of The New Yorker called the film's style "like fresh air" and raved "Something new has come to the movie world at last." Anthony Bower of The Nation called it "brilliant" and praised the cinematography and performances by Welles, Comingore and Cotten. John O'Hara's Newsweek review called it the best picture he'd ever seen and said Welles was "the best actor in the history of acting." Welles called O'Hara's review "the greatest review that anybody ever had."

In the UK C. A. Lejeune of The Observer called it "The most exciting film that has come out of Hollywood in twenty-five years" and Dilys Powell of The Sunday Times said the film's style was made "with the ease and boldness and resource of one who controls and is not controlled by his medium." Edward Tangye Lean of Horizon praised the film's technical style, calling it "perhaps a decade ahead of its contemporaries." (Note: Kevin Brownlow believes that Lean's brother David was influential on (if not co-writer of) this review. Years later Welles thanked David Lean for the article.)

Other reviews were mixed. Edwin Schallert of the Los Angeles Times said it was brilliant and skillful at times, but had an ending that "rather fizzled". The Chicago Tribune called the film interesting and different but "its sacrifice of simplicity to eccentricity robs it of distinction and general entertainment value". Otis Ferguson of The New Republic said it was "the boldest free-hand stroke in major screen production since Griffith and Bitzer were running wild to unshackle the camera", but also criticized its style, calling it a "retrogression in film technique" and stating that "it holds no great place" in film history. Ferguson reacted to some of the film's celebrated visual techniques by calling them "just willful dabbling" and "the old shell game." In a rare film review, filmmaker Erich von Stroheim criticized the film's story and non-linear structure, but praised the technical style and performances, and wrote "Whatever the truth may be about it, Citizen Kane is a great picture and will go down in screen history. More power to Welles!"

Some prominent critics wrote negative reviews. None of them dismissed the film as being altogether bad, noting the film's undeniable technical effects, but they did find fault with the narrative. Eileen Creelman of The New York Sun called it "a cold picture, unemotional, a puzzle rather than a drama". In his 1941 review for Sur, Jorge Luis Borges famously called the film "a labyrinth with no center" and predicted that its legacy would be a film "whose historical value is undeniable but which no one cares to see again." The Argus Weekend Magazine critic Erle Cox called the film "amazing" but thought that Welles's break with Hollywood traditions was "overdone". Tatler's James Agate called it "the well-intentioned, muddled, amateurish thing one expects from high-brows"; he admitted that it was "a quite good film" but insisted that it "tries to run the psychological essay in harness with your detective thriller, and doesn't quite succeed." Other people who disliked the film were W. H. Auden and James Agee. After watching the film on January 29, 1942, future British star Kenneth Williams, then aged 15, curtly described the film in his first diary as "boshey rot".

=== Reception from the public ===
The film did well in cities and larger towns, but it fared poorly in more remote areas. RKO still had problems getting exhibitors to show the film. For example, one chain controlling more than 500 theaters got Welles's film as part of a package but refused to play it, reportedly out of fear of Hearst. Hearst's disruption of the film's release damaged its box office performance and, as a result, it lost $160,000 during its initial run. The film earned $23,878 during its first week in New York. By the ninth week it only made $7,279. Overall it lost money in New York, Boston, Chicago, Los Angeles, San Francisco and Washington, D.C., but made a profit in Seattle.

Moviegoers who saw the picture generally spread negative word of mouth among their neighbors, and exhibitors in the United States and Canada were not shy about voicing their reactions, as published in Motion Picture Herald. A few theater owners were discerning, recognizing the startling new techniques but conceding the poor box office performance was "likely to make your auditorium resound from vacuousness like the giant stone walls in Kane's incredible castle. Boxoffice or no boxoffice, this unusual film is without doubt a step toward elevating the artistic plane of the motion picture in general." A college-town exhibitor reported, "I thought it was fine, as did the majority of people who attended the performances. However, there were some who either did not like it or did not get it. Business was just average." "Don't try to tell me Orson Welles isn't a genius; herein he has produced a mighty fine picture, and herewith he has established for me the lowest gross that I have ever, ever experienced. I would have sworn that such ridiculous receipts were utterly impossible. If you cater to film connoisseurs, this picture is made for you. But me, I hurt all over." Others were more blunt: "Nobody liked this and said so. We took in just enough to pay for it so considered ourselves very lucky." "One day after showing this we still feel hesitant about walking abroad without an escort. Half of the few dozen that paid to see this masterpiece walked out, and the other half remained only to think up new dirty cracks to cast in our direction on the way out." "High priced picture. But I made a little money on my help. They took off three days because they were afraid of being all alone in the theatre." "You can stand in front of a mirror and call yourself 'sucker' when you play this one. It does not have one redeeming feature. It will not draw; those that do come will not know what it is all about." A Minnesota exhibitor summed up the situation for rural areas: "My patrons still don't know what it was all about. Too long and too deep. No boxoffice value to small towns."

=== Hearst's response ===
Hearing about Citizen Kane enraged Hearst so much that he banned any advertising, reviewing, or mentioning of it in his papers, and had his journalists libel Welles. Welles used Hearst's opposition as a pretext for previewing the film in several opinion-making screenings in Los Angeles, lobbying for its artistic worth against the hostile campaign that Hearst was waging. A special press screening took place in early March. Henry Luce was in attendance and reportedly wanted to buy the film from RKO for $1 million to distribute it himself. The reviews for this screening were positive. A Hollywood Review headline read, "Mr. Genius Comes Through; 'Kane' Astonishing Picture". The Motion Picture Herald reported about the screening and Hearst's intention to sue RKO. Time wrote that "The objection of Mr. Hearst, who founded a publishing empire on sensationalism, is ironic. For to most of the several hundred people who have seen the film at private screenings, Citizen Kane is the most sensational product of the U.S. movie industry." A second press screening occurred in April.

When Schaefer rejected Hearst's offer to suppress the film, Hearst banned every newspaper and station in his media conglomerate from reviewing—or even mentioning—the film. He also had many movie theaters ban it, and many did not show it through fear of being socially exposed by his massive newspaper empire. The Oscar-nominated documentary The Battle Over Citizen Kane solely blames the failure of Citizen Kane on Hearst's actions. The film did decent business at the box office; it went on to be the sixth highest grossing film in its year of release, a modest success its backers found acceptable. Nevertheless, the film's commercial performance fell short of its creators' expectations. Hearst's biographer David Nasaw points out that Hearst's actions were not the only reason Kane failed, however: the innovations Welles made with narrative, as well as the dark message at the heart of the film (that the pursuit of success is ultimately futile) meant that a popular audience could not appreciate its merits.

Hearst's attacks against Welles went beyond attempting to suppress the film. Welles said that while he was on his post-filming lecture tour a police detective approached him at a restaurant and advised him not to go back to his hotel. A 14-year-old girl had reportedly been hidden in the closet of his room, and two photographers were waiting for him to walk in. Knowing he would be jailed after the resulting publicity, Welles did not return to the hotel but waited until the train left town the following morning.

In March 1941, Welles directed a Broadway version of Richard Wright's Native Son (and, for luck, used a "Rosebud" sled as a prop). Native Son received positive reviews, but Hearst-owned papers used the opportunity to attack Welles as a communist. The Hearst papers vociferously attacked Welles after his April 1941 radio play, "His Honor, the Mayor", produced for The Free Company radio series on CBS.

Welles described his chance encounter with Hearst in an elevator at the Fairmont Hotel on the night Citizen Kane opened in San Francisco. Hearst and Welles's father were acquaintances, so Welles introduced himself and asked Hearst if he would like to come to the opening. Hearst did not respond. "As he was getting off at his floor, I said, 'Charles Foster Kane would have accepted.' No reply", recalled Welles. "And Kane would have, you know. That was his style—just as he finished Jed Leland's bad review of Susan as an opera singer."

In 1945, Hearst journalist Robert Shaw wrote that the film got "a full tide of insensate fury" from Hearst papers, "then it ebbed suddenly. With one brain cell working, the chief realized that such hysterical barking by the trained seals would attract too much attention to the picture. But to this day the name of Orson Welles is on the official son-of-a-bitch list of every Hearst newspaper".

Despite Hearst's attempts to destroy the film, since 1941 references to his life and career have usually included a reference to Citizen Kane, such as the headline "Son of Citizen Kane Dies" for the obituary of Hearst's son. In 2012, the Hearst estate agreed to screen the film at Hearst Castle in San Simeon, breaking Hearst's ban on the film.

== Re-evaluation ==
Modern critics have given Citizen Kane an even more positive response. Review aggregation website Rotten Tomatoes reports that 99% of 137 critics gave the film a positive review, with an average rating of 9.9/10. Rotten Tomatoes summarizes the critical consensus as, "Orson Welles's epic tale of a publishing tycoon's rise and fall is entertaining, poignant, and inventive in its storytelling, earning its reputation as a landmark achievement in film". By April 2021, it was noted that the addition of an 80-year-old negative review from the Chicago Tribune reduced the film's rating from 100% to 99% on the site; Citizen Kane held its 100% rating until early 2021. On Metacritic, however, the film still has a very rare weighted average score of 100 out of 100 based on 19 critics, indicating "universal acclaim".

The film was included by the Vatican in a list of important films compiled in 1995, under the category of "Art". The February 2020 issue of New York Magazine lists Citizen Kane as among "The Best Movies That Lost Best Picture at the Oscars."

Roger Ebert wrote of it, "Its surface is as much fun as any movie ever made. Its depths surpass understanding. I have analyzed it a shot at a time with more than 30 groups, and together we have seen, I believe, pretty much everything that is there on the screen. The more clearly I can see its physical manifestation, the more I am stirred by its mystery."

=== Accolades ===
Award	Category	Nominee(s)	Result
Academy Awards	Outstanding Motion Picture	Mercury	Nominated
Academy Awards	Best Director	Orson Welles	Nominated
Academy Awards	Best Actor	Orson Welles	Nominated
Academy Awards	Best Original Screenplay	Herman J. Mankiewicz and Orson Welles	Won
Academy Awards	Best Art Direction–Interior Decoration – Black-and-White	Perry Ferguson, Van Nest Polglase, Al Fields and Darrell Silvera	Nominated
Academy Awards	Best Cinematography – Black-and-White	Gregg Toland	Nominated
Academy Awards	Best Film Editing	Robert Wise	Nominated
Academy Awards	Best Scoring of a Dramatic Picture	Bernard Herrmann	Nominated
Academy Awards	Best Sound Recording	John Aalberg	Nominated
DVD Exclusive Awards	Best Audio Commentary	Roger Ebert	Won
National Board of Review Awards	Best Film		Won
National Board of Review Awards	Top Ten Films		Won
National Board of Review Awards	Best Acting	George Coulouris	Won
National Board of Review Awards	Best Acting	Orson Welles	Won
National Film Preservation Board	National Film Registry		Inducted
New York Film Critics Circle Awards	Best Film		Won
New York Film Critics Circle Awards	Best Director	Orson Welles	Nominated
New York Film Critics Circle Awards	Best Actor	Orson Welles	Nominated
Online Film & Television Association Awards	Hall of Fame – Motion Picture		Won
Online Film Critics Society Awards	Best Overall DVD		Nominated
Satellite Awards	Best Classic DVD	Citizen Kane: Ultimate Collector's Edition	Nominated
Saturn Awards	Best DVD/Blu-Ray Special Edition Release	Citizen Kane: 70th Anniversary Ultimate Collector's Edition	Nominated
Village Voice Film Poll	Best Film of the Century		Won

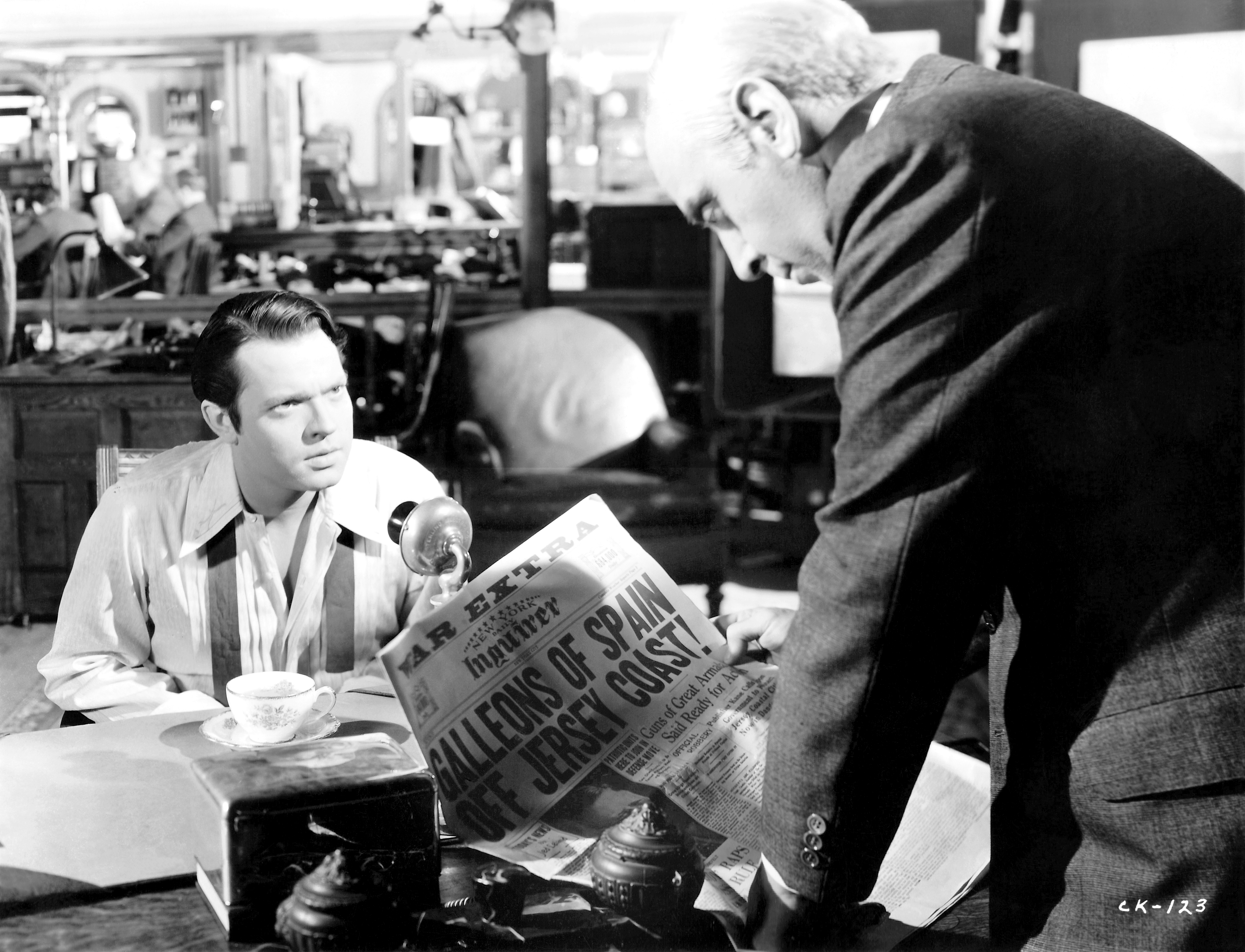
The National Board of Review recognized both Welles and George Coulouris for their performances in Citizen Kane, which was also voted the best film of 1941.

It was widely believed the film would win most of its Academy Award nominations, but it received only the award for Best Original Screenplay. Variety reported that block voting by screen extras deprived Citizen Kane of Best Picture and Best Actor, and similar prejudices were likely to have been responsible for the film receiving no technical awards. In 2006, the Writers Guild of America ranked its screenplay 4th in WGA's list of 101 Greatest Screenplays.

== Legacy ==
Citizen Kane was the only film made under Welles's original contract with RKO Pictures, which gave him complete creative control. Welles's new business manager and attorney permitted the contract to lapse. In July 1941, Welles reluctantly signed a new and less favorable deal with RKO under which he produced and directed The Magnificent Ambersons (1942), produced Journey into Fear (1943), and began It's All True, a film he agreed to do without payment. In the new contract Welles was an employee of the studio and lost the right to final cut, which later allowed RKO to modify and re-cut The Magnificent Ambersons over his objections. In June 1942, Schaefer resigned the presidency of RKO Pictures and Welles's contract was terminated by his successor.

The European release of Kane was delayed until after World War II, premiering in Paris in 1946. Initial reception by French critics was influenced by negative views from Jean-Paul Sartre and Georges Sadoul, who criticized Hollywood's cultural sophistication and the film's nostalgic use of flashbacks. However, critic André Bazin delivered a transformative speech in 1946 that shifted public opinion. Bazin praised the film for its innovative use of mise-en-scène and deep focus cinematography, advocating for a filmic realism that allows audiences to engage more actively with the narrative. Bazin's essays, especially "The Technique of Citizen Kane", played a crucial role in enhancing the film's reputation, arguing it revolutionized film language and aesthetics. His defense of Citizen Kane as a work of art influenced other critics and contributed to a broader re-evaluation of the film in Europe and the United States.

In the U.S., the film was initially neglected until it began appearing on television in the 1950s and was re-released in theaters. American film critic Andrew Sarris was significant in reviving its reputation, describing it as a profoundly influential American film. Over the decades, Citizen Kane has been consistently ranked highly in critical surveys and polls, often cited as 'the greatest film ever made.'

The film's narrative structure, cinematography and themes have influenced countless filmmakers and films worldwide, asserting its place as a cornerstone in the history of cinema. Martin Scorsese recalls, "I saw Citizen Kane on TV...And I began to become aware of editing and camera positions...Welles was not afraid of being self-conscious with the camera and making self-referential remarks with the camera." Steven Spielberg says

It means everything to me... It is an icon of courage...It's about courage and audacity, and I'm making this my way, and I'm going to make this my way, and I'm going to deepen the focus...we're going to see from one inch to infinity in every shot, and we're going to see ceilings, and we're going to tell a very convoluted mystery story about a man's life. It is just one of the greatest movies ever made.

In 1982, Spielberg bought one of the prop sleds from Citizen Kane. Spielberg called Kane 'the most classic movie ever made," and the sled "a symbolic emblem of quality in the film business."

Roger Ebert wrote,

Citizen Kane knows that the sled is not the answer. It explains what Rosebud is, but not what Rosebud means. The film's construction shows how our lives, after we're gone, survive only in the memories of others, and those memories butt up against the walls we erect and the roles we play. There is the Kane who made shadow figures with his fingers, and the Kane who hated the traction trust; the Kane who chose his mistress over his marriage and political career, the Kane who entertained millions, the Kane who died alone.

There is a master image in Citizen Kane that you might easily miss. The tycoon has overextended himself and is losing control of his empire. After he signs the papers of his surrender, he turns and walks into the back of the shot. Deep focus allows Welles to play a trick of perspective. Behind Kane on the wall is a window that seems to be of ordinary size. But as he walks towards it, we see it is farther away and much higher than we thought. Eventually he stands beneath its lower sill, shrunken and diminished. Then as he walks towards us, his stature grows again. A man always seems the same size to himself, because he does not stand where we stand when we look at him.

== Rights and home media ==
The composited camera negative of Citizen Kane is believed to be lost forever. The most commonly reported explanation is that it was destroyed in a New Jersey film laboratory fire in the 1970s. However, in 2021, Nicolas Falacci revealed that he had been told "the real story" by a colleague, when he was one of two employees in the film restoration lab which assembled the 1991 "restoration" from the best available elements. Falacci noted that throughout the process he had daily visits in 1990–91 from an unnamed "older RKO executive showing up every day – nervous and sweating". According to Falacci's colleague, this elderly man was keen to cover up a clerical error he had made decades earlier when in charge of the studio's inventory, which had resulted in the original camera negatives being sent to a silver reclamation plant, destroying the nitrate film to extract its valuable silver content. Falacci's account is impossible to verify, but it would have been fully in keeping with industry standard practice for many decades, which was to destroy prints and negatives of countless older films deemed non-commercially viable, to extract the silver.

Subsequent prints were derived from a master positive (a fine-grain preservation element) made in the 1940s and originally intended for use in overseas distribution. Modern techniques were used to produce a pristine print for a 50th Anniversary theatrical reissue in 1991 which Paramount Pictures released for then-owner Turner Broadcasting System, which earned $1.6 million in North America and $1.8 million worldwide.

In 1955, RKO sold the American television rights to its film library, including Citizen Kane, to C&C Television Corp. In 1960, television rights to the pre-1959 RKO's live-action library were acquired by United Artists. RKO kept the non-broadcast television rights to its library.

In 1976, when home video was in its infancy, entrepreneur Snuff Garrett bought cassette rights to the RKO library for what United Press International termed "a pittance". In 1978 The Nostalgia Merchant released the film through Media Home Entertainment. By 1980 the 800-title library of The Nostalgia Merchant was earning $2.3 million a year. RKO Home Video released the film on VHS and Betamax in 1985.

On December 3, 1984, The Criterion Collection released the film as its first LaserDisc. It was made from a fine grain master positive provided by the UCLA Film and Television Archive. In 1992 Criterion released a new 50th Anniversary Edition LaserDisc. This version had an improved transfer and additional special features, including the documentary The Legacy of Citizen Kane and Welles's early short "The Hearts of Age".

Turner Broadcasting System acquired broadcast television rights to the RKO library in 1986 and the full worldwide rights to the library in 1987. The RKO Home Video unit was reorganized into Turner Home Entertainment that year. In 1991 Turner released a 50th Anniversary Edition on VHS and as a collector's edition that includes the film, the documentary Reflections On Citizen Kane, Harlan Lebo's 50th anniversary album, a poster and a copy of the original script. In 1996, Time Warner acquired Turner and Warner Home Video absorbed Turner Home Entertainment. In 2011, Time Warner's Warner Bros. unit had distribution rights for the film.

In 2001, Warner Home Video released a 60th Anniversary Collectors Edition DVD. The two-disc DVD included feature-length commentaries by Roger Ebert and Peter Bogdanovich, as well as a second DVD with the feature-length documentary The Battle Over Citizen Kane (1999). It was simultaneously released on VHS. The DVD was criticized for being "too bright, too clean; the dirt and grime had been cleared away, but so had a good deal of the texture, the depth, and the sense of film grain."

In 2003, Welles's daughter Beatrice Welles sued Turner Entertainment, claiming the Welles estate is the legal copyright holder of the film. She claimed that Welles's deal to terminate his contracts with RKO meant that Turner's copyright of the film was null and void. She also claimed that the estate of Orson Welles was owed 20% of the film's profits if her copyright claim was not upheld. In 2007 she was allowed to proceed with the lawsuit, overturning the 2004 decision in favor of Turner Entertainment on the issue of video rights.

In 2011, it was released on Blu-ray and DVD in a 70th anniversary edition. It was called "the Blu-ray release of the year" by the San Francisco Chronicle, ironically owned by the Hearst family at this point. Supplements included everything available on the 2001 Warner Home Video release, including The Battle Over Citizen Kane DVD. A 70th Anniversary Ultimate Collector's Edition added a third DVD with RKO 281 (1999), an award-winning TV movie about the making of the film. Its packaging extras included a hardcover book and a folio containing mini reproductions of the original souvenir program, lobby cards, and production memos and correspondence. The transfer for the US releases were scanned as 4K resolution from three different 35mm prints and rectified the quality issues of the 2001 DVD. The rest of the world continued to receive home video releases based on the older transfer. This was partially rectified in 2016 with the release of the 75th Anniversary Edition in both the UK and US, which was a straight repackaging of the main disc from the 70th Anniversary Edition.

On August 11, 2021, Criterion announced their first Ultra HD Blu-ray releases would include Citizen Kane. Citizen Kane was released on November 23, 2021, as a 4K and 3-Blu-ray-disc package. However, the release was recalled because at the half-hour mark on the regular Blu-ray, the contrast fell sharply, which resulted in a much darker image than what was supposed to occur.

=== Colorization controversy ===
In the 1980s, Citizen Kane became a catalyst in the controversy over the colorization of black-and-white films. One proponent of film colorization was Ted Turner, whose Turner Entertainment Company owned the RKO library. A Turner Entertainment spokesperson initially stated that Citizen Kane would not be colorized, but in July 1988 Turner said, "Citizen Kane? I'm thinking of colorizing it." Criticism increased when filmmaker Henry Jaglom stated that shortly before his death Welles had implored him "don't let Ted Turner deface my movie with his crayons."

In February 1989, Turner Entertainment President Roger Mayer announced that work to colorize the film had been stopped due to provisions in Welles's 1939 contract with RKO that "could be read to prohibit colorization without permission of the Welles estate." Turner had only colorized the final reel of the film before abandoning the project. In 1991 one minute of the colorized test footage was included in the BBC Arena documentary The Complete Citizen Kane. (Note: The colorized Citizen Kane footage appears at approximately 1:17:00.) The colorization controversy was a factor in the passage of the National Film Preservation Act in 1988 which created the National Film Registry the following year.

== Bibliography ==
- Bazin, André. The Technique of Citizen Kane. Paris, France: Les Temps modernes 2, number 17, 1947. pp. 943–949.
- Biskind, Peter (ed.), Jaglom, Henry and Welles, Orson. My Lunches with Orson: Conversations between Henry Jaglom and Orson Welles. New York: Metropolitan Books, 2013. ISBN 978-0-8050-9725-2.
- Bogdanovich, Peter and Welles, Orson. This is Orson Welles. HarperPerennial 1992. ISBN 0-06-092439-X
- Bogdanovich, Peter and Welles, Orson (uncredited). "The Kane Mutiny", in Esquire, October 1972. (Note: Reprinted in Gottesman, Ronald (ed.). Focus on Citizen Kane. Englewood Cliffs, New Jersey: Prentice-Hall, 1976. ISBN 0-13-949214-3) (Note: Excerpted in "My Orson", Bogdanovich's new introduction to the second edition of This is Orson Welles)
- Brady, Frank. Citizen Welles: A Biography of Orson Welles. New York: Charles Scribner's Sons, 1989. ISBN 0-385-26759-2.
- Callow, Simon. Orson Welles: The Road to Xanadu. London: Jonathan Cape, 1995. ISBN 0-224-03852-4
- Carringer, Robert L. The Making of Citizen Kane. Berkeley and Los Angeles: University of California Press, 1985. ISBN 0-520-05367-2 hardcover; 1996 revised and updated edition ISBN 0-520-20567-7 paperback
- Carringer, Robert L. "The Scripts of Citizen Kane", in Critical Inquiry No. 5, 1978. (Note: Reprinted in Gottesman, Ronald (ed.). Perspectives on Citizen Kane. New York: G. K. Hall & Co., 1996. ISBN 978-0-8161-1616-4) (Note: Reprinted in Naremore, James (ed.). Orson Welles's Citizen Kane: A Casebook in Criticism. Oxford: Oxford University Press, 2004. ISBN 978-0-19-515892-2)
- Cook, David A. A History of Narrative Film. W.W. Norton Company, 2004. ISBN 0-393-97868-0
- Gottesman, Ronald (ed.). Focus on Citizen Kane. Englewood Cliffs, New Jersey: Prentice-Hall, 1976. ISBN 0-13-949214-3
- Gottesman, Ronald (ed.). Perspectives on Citizen Kane. New York: G. K. Hall & Co., 1996. ISBN 978-0-8161-1616-4
- Heylin, Clinton. Despite the System: Orson Welles Versus the Hollywood Studios, Chicago Review Press, 2005. ISBN 1-55652-547-8
- Howard, James. The Complete Films of Orson Welles. New York: Carol Publishing Group, 1991. ISBN 0-8065-1241-5.
- Kael, Pauline, Welles, Orson and Mankiewicz, Herman J. The Citizen Kane Book. Boston: Little, Brown and Company, 1971. (Note: Contains Kael's controversial essay "Raising Kane", originally printed in The New Yorker (February 20 and 27, 1971), as well as the full script by Mankiewicz and Welles.)
- Leaming, Barbara. Orson Welles, A Biography. New York: Viking Press, 1985. ISBN 978-0-618-15446-3.
- Meryman, Richard. Mank: The Wit, World and Life of Herman Mankiewicz. New York: William Morrow and Company, 1978. ISBN 978-0-688-03356-9.
- Mulvey, Laura. Citizen Kane. London: British Film Institute, 1992. ISBN 0-85170-339-9
- Naremore, James (ed.). Orson Welles's Citizen Kane: A Casebook in Criticism. Oxford: Oxford University Press, 2004. ISBN 978-0-19-515892-2
- Nasaw, David. The Chief: The Life of William Randolph Hearst. New York: Houghton Mifflin, 2000. ISBN 978-0-618-15446-3
- Rippy, Marguerite H. Orson Welles and the Unfinished RKO Projects: A Postmodern Perspective. Southern Illinois University Press, Illinois, 2009. ISBN 978-0-8093-2912-0
- Rosenbaum, Jonathan. "I Missed It at the Movies: Objections to 'Raising Kane'", in Film Comment, Spring 1972. (Note: Reprinted in Rosenbaum, Jonathan (ed.). Discovering Orson Welles. Berkeley: University of California Press, 2007, ISBN 978-0-520-25123-6)
- Stern, Sydney Ladensohn. The Brothers Mankiewicz: Hope, Heartbreak, and Hollywood Classics. Jackson: University Press of Mississippi, 2019. ISBN 978-1617032677

== See also ==
- List of cult films
