= Art Nouveau =

1890–1911 European style of art and architecture

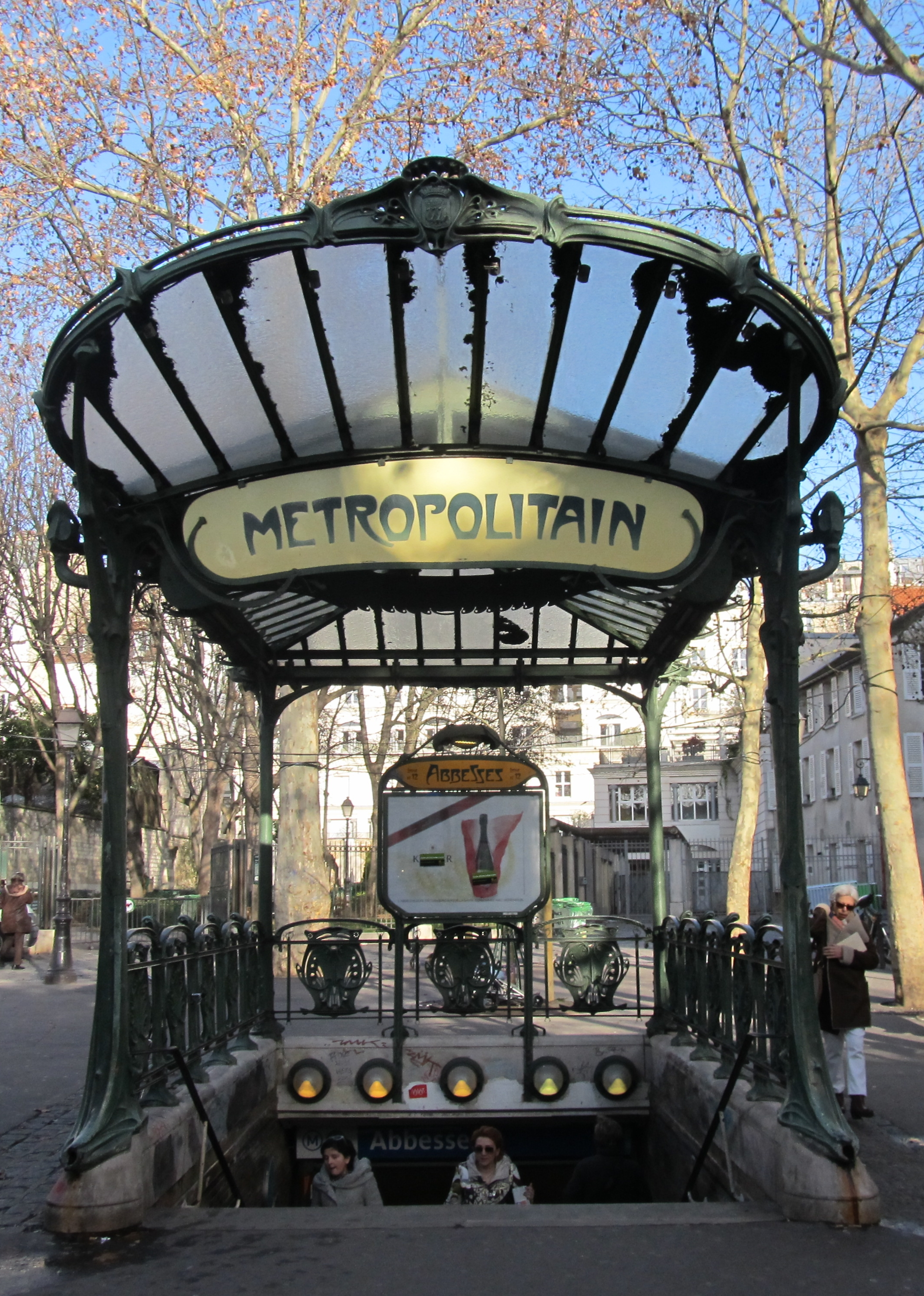
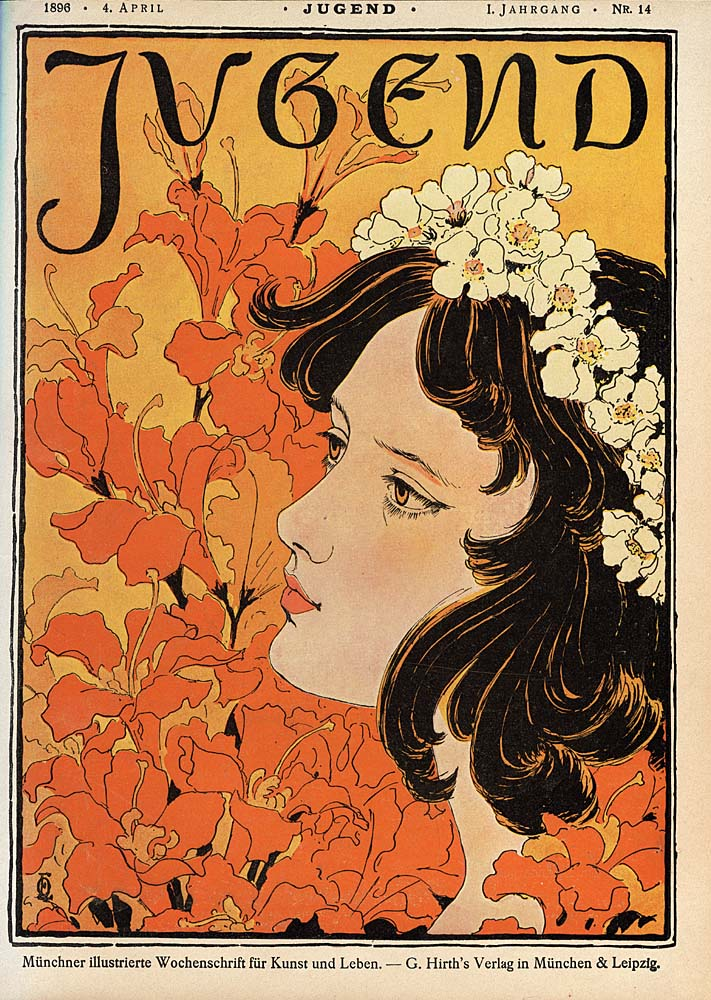
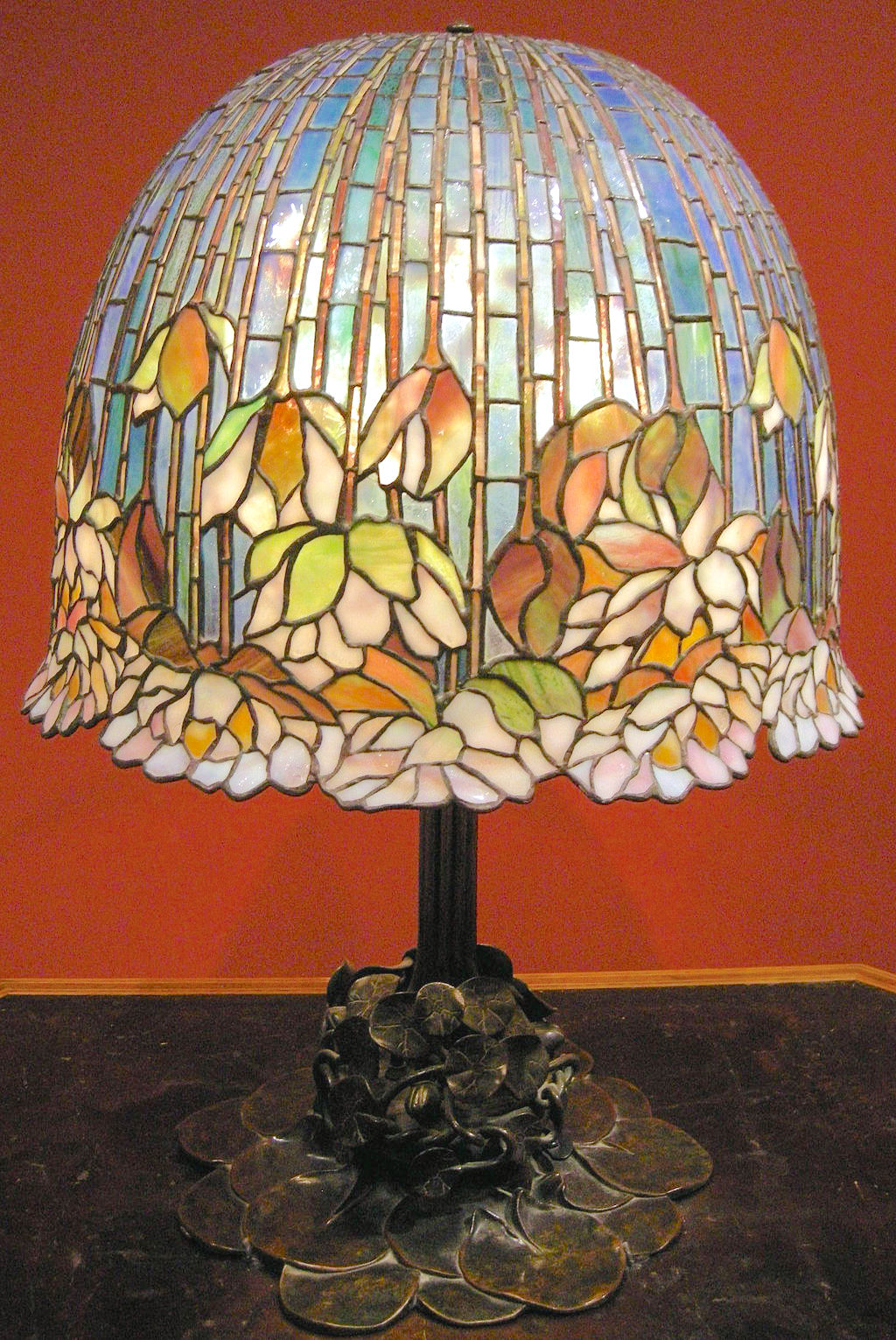
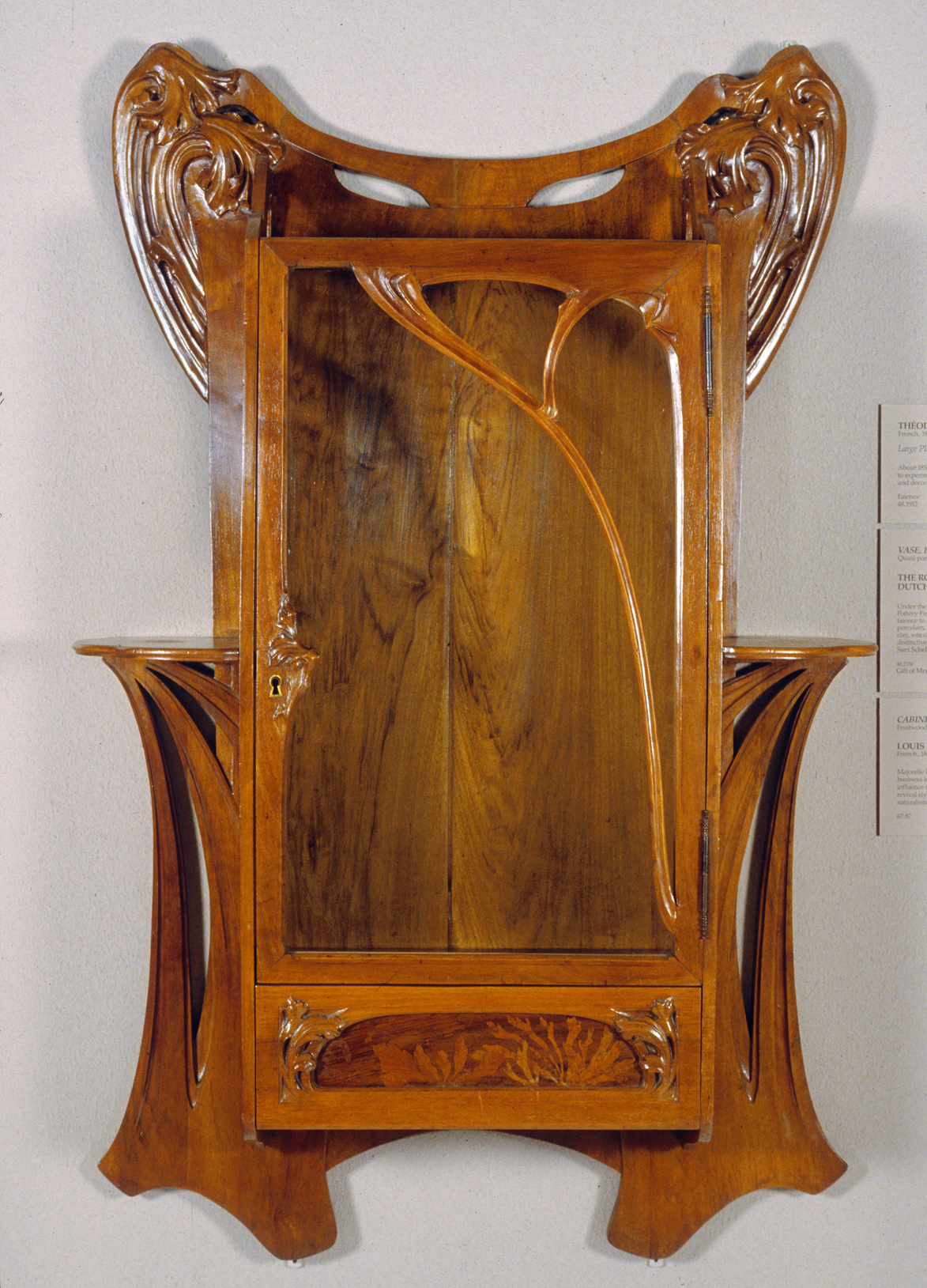
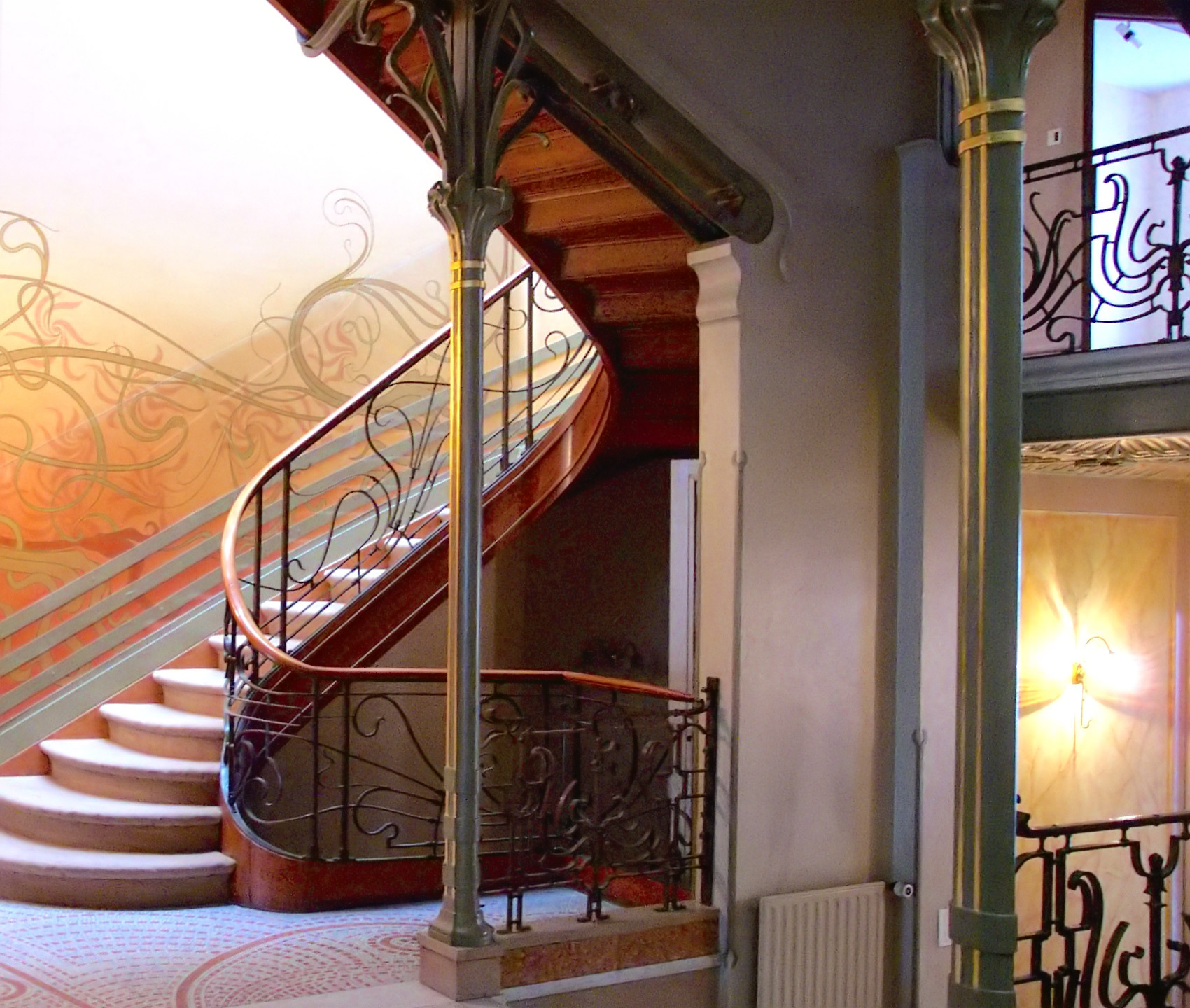
- Clockwise from top left: Paris Métro station Abbesses by Hector Guimard (1900); cover of Jugend magazine by Otto Eckmann (1896); wall cabinet by Louis Majorelle; interior of the Hôtel Tassel in Brussels by Victor Horta (1892–1893); lamp by Louis Comfort Tiffany (1900–1910)

Additional media
- Years active: c. 1883–1914
- Location: Western world

Art Nouveau (/ˌɑːr(t) nuːˈvoʊ/ AR(T) noo-VOH; French: [aʁ nuvo]; lit. 'New Art') is an international style of art, architecture, and applied art, especially the decorative arts. It was often inspired by natural forms such as the sinuous curves of plants and flowers. Other characteristics of Art Nouveau were a sense of dynamism and movement, often given by asymmetry or whiplash lines, and the use of modern materials, particularly iron, glass, ceramics and later concrete, to create unusual forms and larger open spaces. It was popular between 1890 and 1910 during the Belle Époque period, and was a reaction against the academicism, eclecticism and historicism of 19th-century architecture and decorative art.

One major objective of Art Nouveau was to break down the traditional distinction between fine arts (especially painting and sculpture) and applied arts. It was most widely used in interior design, graphic arts, furniture, glass art, textiles, ceramics, jewellery and metal work. The style responded to leading 19th-century theoreticians, such as French architect Eugène-Emmanuel Viollet-le-Duc (1814–1879) and British art critic John Ruskin (1819–1900). In Britain, it was influenced by William Morris and the Arts and Crafts movement. German architects and designers sought a spiritually uplifting Gesamtkunstwerk ('total work of art') that would unify the architecture, furnishings, and art in the interior in a common style, to uplift and inspire the residents.

The first Art Nouveau houses and interior decoration appeared in Brussels in the 1890s, in the architecture and interior design of houses designed by Paul Hankar, Henry van de Velde, and especially Victor Horta, whose Hôtel Tassel was completed in 1893. It moved quickly to Paris, where it was adapted by Hector Guimard, who saw Horta's work in Brussels and applied the style to the entrances of the new Paris Métro. It reached its peak at the 1900 Paris International Exposition, which introduced the Art Nouveau work of artists such as Louis Tiffany. It appeared in graphic arts in the posters of Alphonse Mucha, and the glassware of René Lalique and Émile Gallé.

From Britain, Belgium and France, Art Nouveau spread to the rest of Europe, taking on different names and characteristics in each country (see Naming section below). It often appeared not only in capitals, but also in rapidly growing cities that wanted to establish artistic identities (Turin and Palermo in Italy; Glasgow in Scotland; Munich and Darmstadt in Germany; Barcelona in Catalonia, Spain), as well as in centres of independence movements (Helsinki in Finland, then part of the Russian Empire).

By 1914, with the beginning of the First World War, Art Nouveau was largely exhausted. In the 1920s, it was replaced as the dominant architectural and decorative art style by Art Deco and then modernism. The Art Nouveau style began to receive more positive attention from critics in the late 1960s, with a major exhibition of the work of Hector Guimard at the Museum of Modern Art in 1970.

== Naming ==
The term Art Nouveau was first used in the 1880s in the Belgian journal L'Art Moderne to describe the work of Les Vingt, twenty painters and sculptors seeking reform through art. The name was popularized by the Maison de l'Art Nouveau ('House of the New Art'), an art gallery opened in Paris in 1895 by the Franco-German art dealer Siegfried Bing. In Britain, the French term Art Nouveau was commonly used, while in France, it was often called by the term Style moderne (akin to the British term Modern Style), or Style 1900. In France, it was also sometimes called Style Jules Verne (after the novelist Jules Verne), Style Métro (after Hector Guimard's iron and glass subway entrances), Art Belle Époque, or Art fin de siècle.

Art Nouveau is known by different names in different languages: Jugendstil in German, Stile Liberty in Italian, Modernisme in Catalan, and also known as the Modern Style in English. The style is often related to, but not always identical with, styles that emerged in many countries in Europe and elsewhere at about the same time. Their local names were often used in their respective countries to describe the whole movement.

- In Austria and the neighbouring countries then part of the Austro-Hungarian Empire, it was called Wiener Jugendstil ('Viennese youth style'), or Secessionsstil ('Secession style'), after the artists of the Vienna Secession (Hungarian: szecesszió, Czech: secese, Slovak: secesia, Polish: secesja).
- In Belgium, it was sometimes termed Style coup de fouet ('Whiplash style'), Paling Stijl ('Eel Style'), or Style nouille ('Noodle style') by its detractors.
- In Britain, besides Art Nouveau, it was known as the Modern Style, or, because of the works of the Glasgow School, as the Glasgow style.
- In Denmark, it is known as Skønvirke ('Work of beauty').
- In Germany and Scandinavia, it was called Reformstil ('Reform style'), or Jugendstil ('Youth style'), after the popular German art magazine Jugend, as well as Wellenstil ('Wave style'), or Lilienstil ('Lily style'). It is now called Jugend in Finland, Sweden, and Norway; Juugend in Estonia; and Jūgendstils in Latvia. In Finland, it was also called Kalevala Style.
- In Italy, it was often called stile Liberty ('Liberty style'), after Arthur Lasenby Liberty, the founder of London's Liberty & Co, whose textile designs were popular. It was also sometimes called stile floreale ('floral style') or arte nuova ('new art'; not in use anymore).
- In Japan, Shiro-Uma.
- In the Netherlands, jugendstil, Nieuwe Kunst ('New Art'), Nieuwe Stijl ('New style'), vermicellistijl, slaoliestijl, Berlagestijl or Binnenhuisstijl.
- In Poland, Secesja ('Secession').
- In Portugal, Arte nova ('New Art').
- In Romania, Arta 1900 ('1900 Art'), Arta Nouă ('New Art'), or Noul Stil ('New Style').
- In Spain, Modernismo, Modernisme (in Catalan) and Arte joven ('Young art').
- In Switzerland, style sapin ('fir-tree style').
- In the United States, due to its association with Louis Comfort Tiffany, it was sometimes called the Tiffany style.
- The term Modern was used in then Russian Empire and still used in current successor states such as Azerbaijan, Kazakhstan, Russia, and Ukraine, while it is called Modernas in Lithuania. For painting, the name of the Mir Iskusstva ('World of Art') movement was also used.

== History ==
=== Origins ===
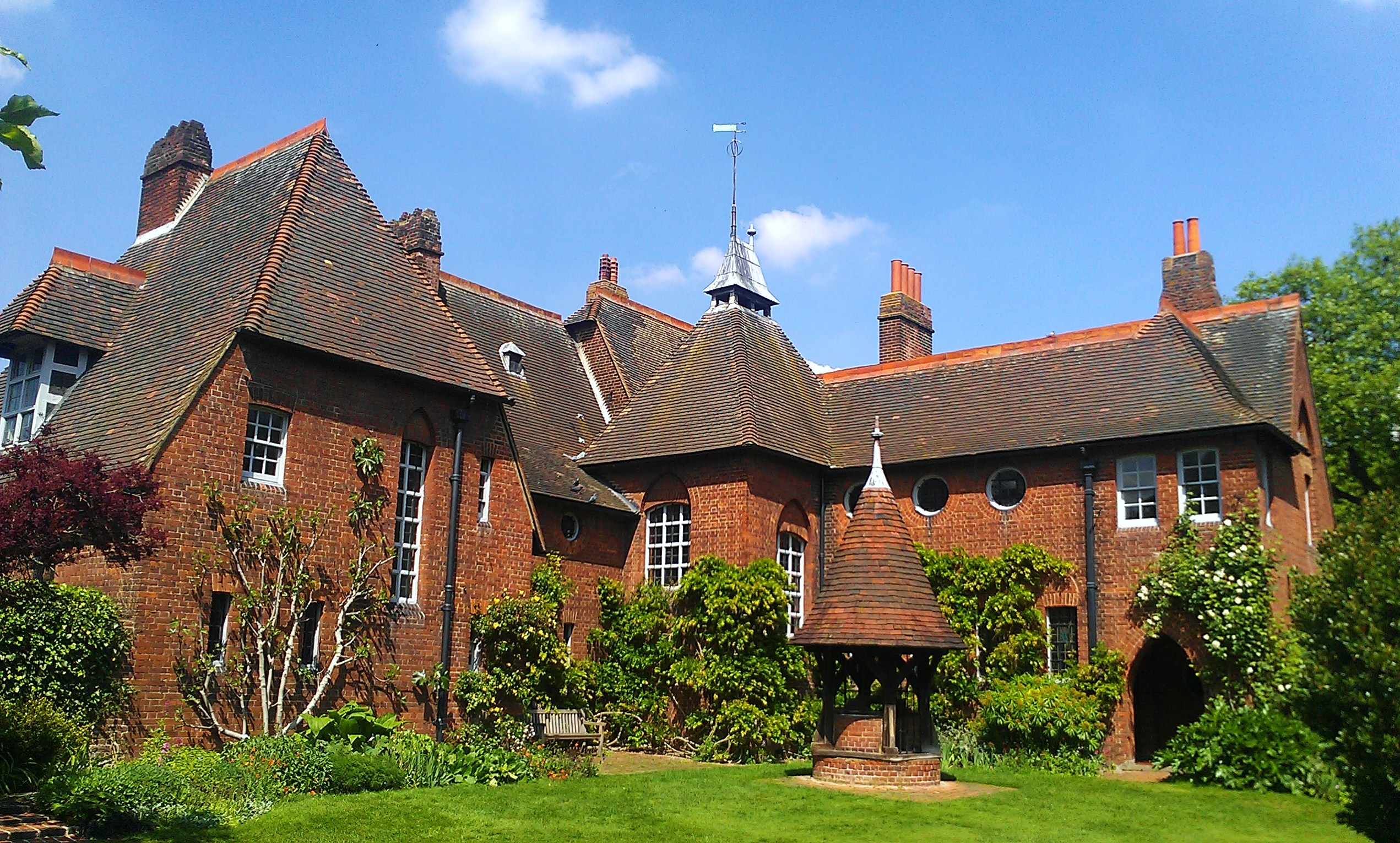
Red House in Bexleyheath (London) by William Morris and Philip Webb (1859)

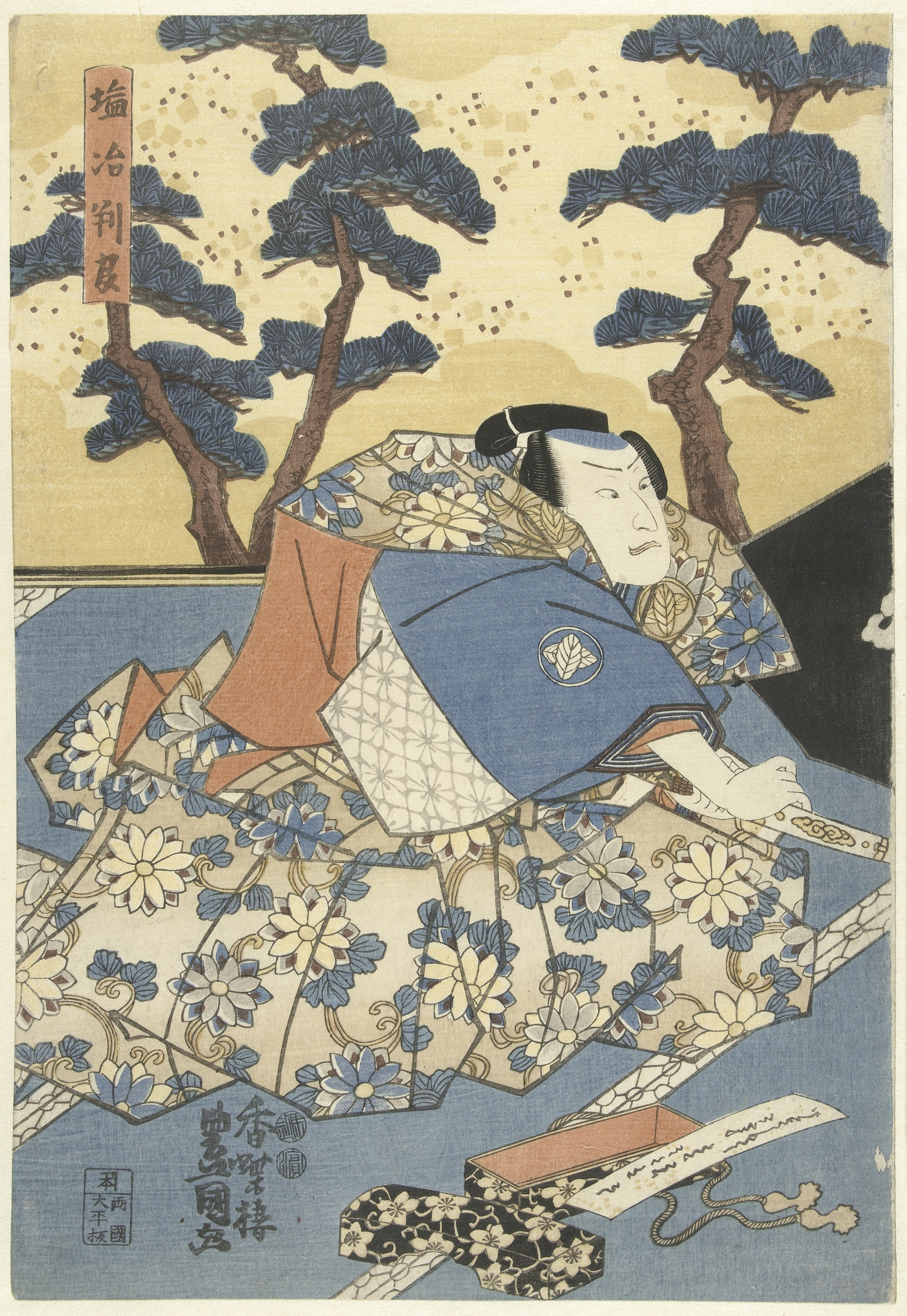
Japanese woodblock print by Utagawa Kunisada (1850s)

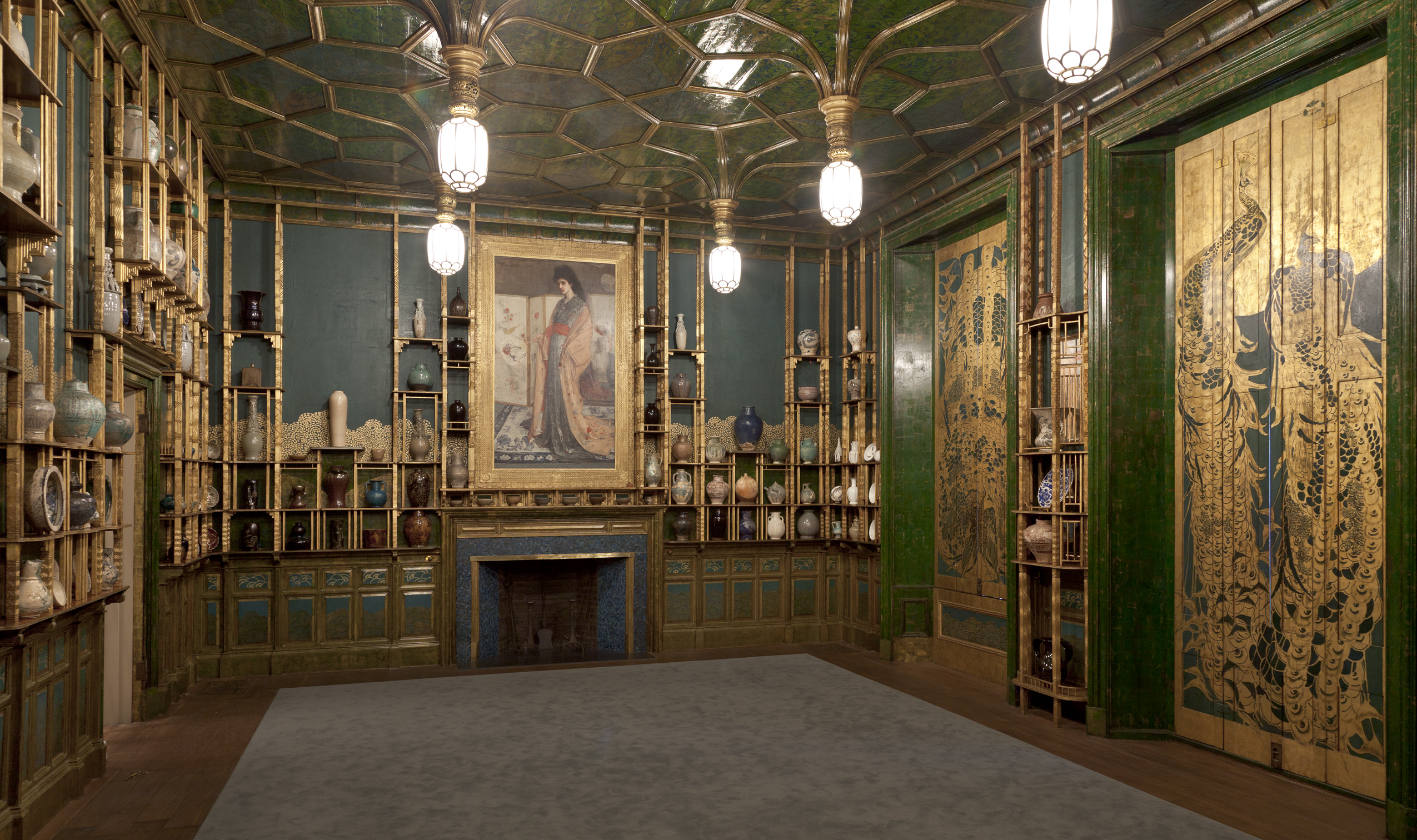
The Peacock Room by James McNeill Whistler (1876–77), now in the Freer Gallery of Art, Washington, D.C.

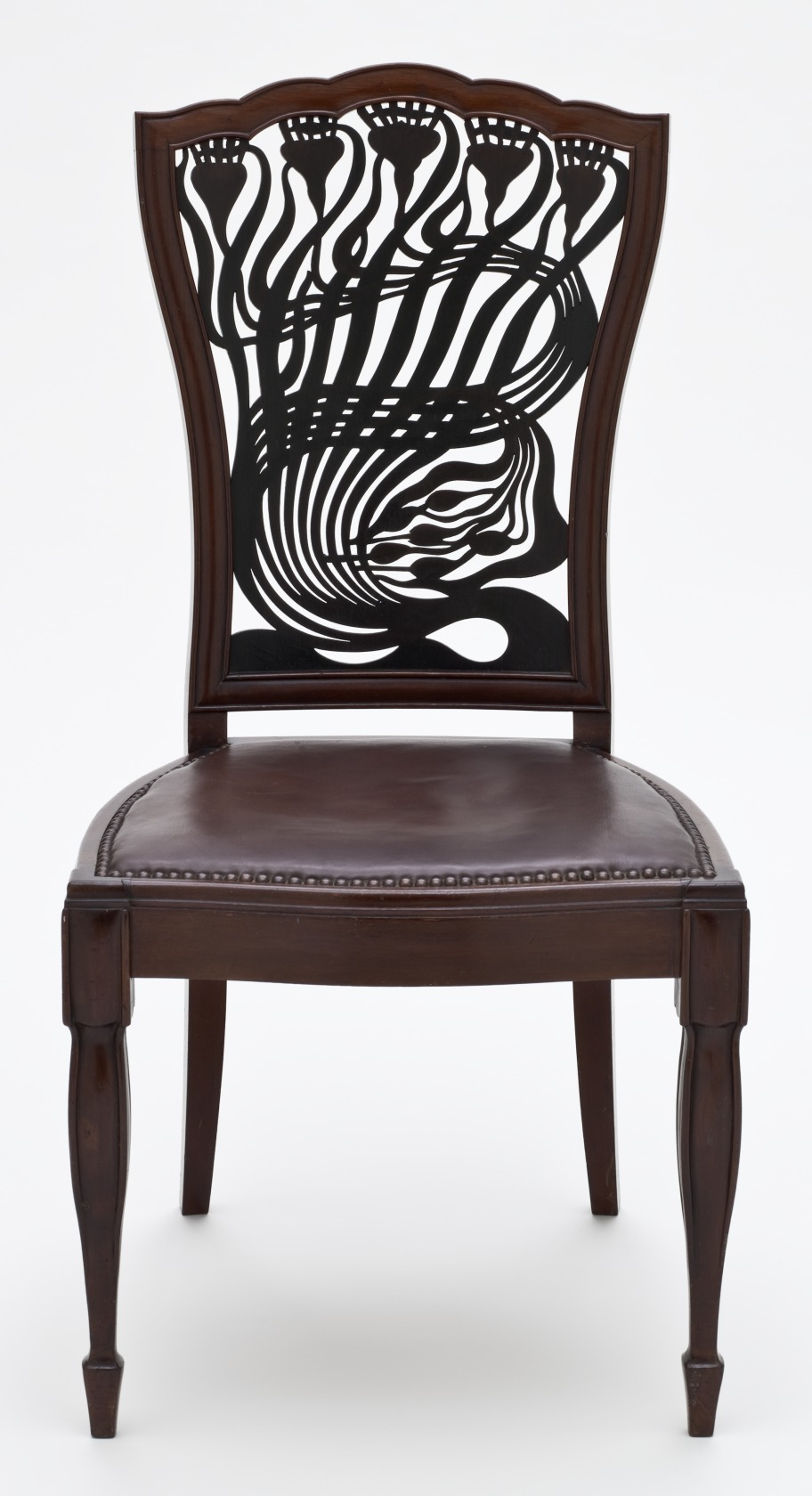
Chair designed by Arthur Mackmurdo (1882–83)

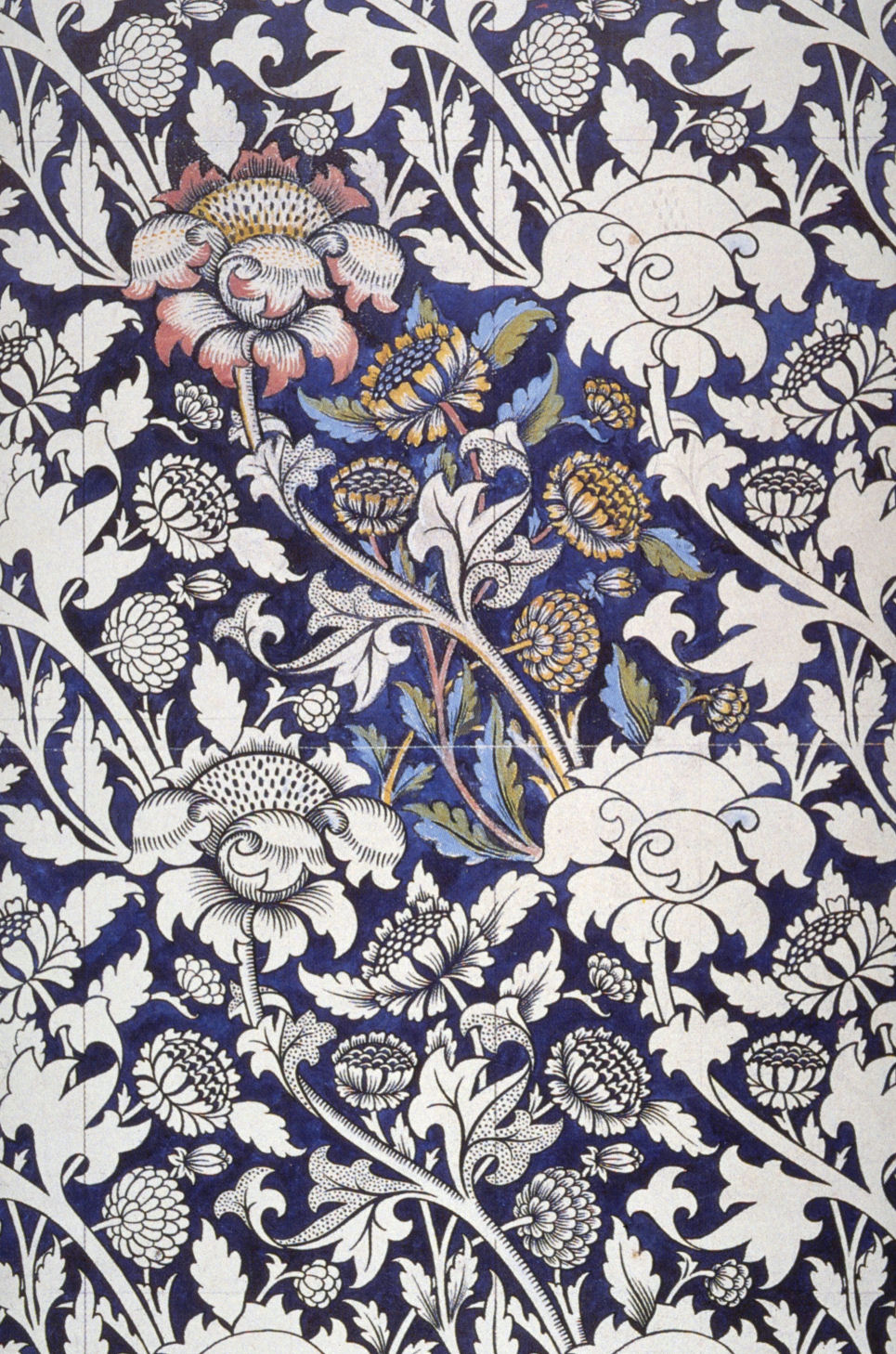
William Morris printed textile design (1883)

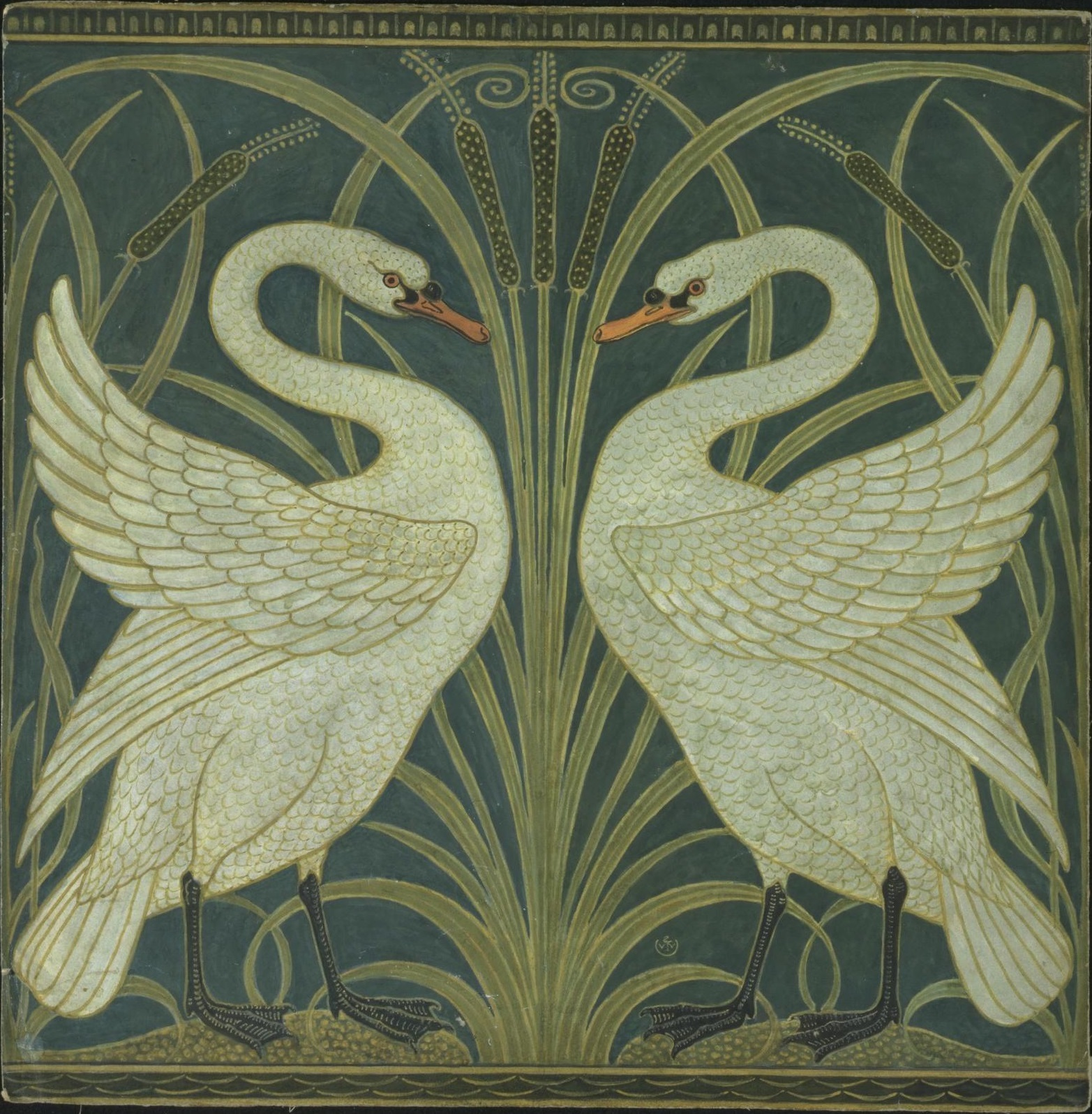
Swan, rush and iris wallpaper design by Walter Crane (1883)

The new art movement had its roots in Britain, in the floral designs of William Morris, and in the Arts and Crafts movement founded by the pupils of Morris. Early prototypes of the style include the Red House with interiors by Morris and architecture by Philip Webb (1859), and the lavish Peacock Room by James Abbott McNeill Whistler. The new movement was also strongly influenced by the Pre-Raphaelite painters, including Dante Gabriel Rossetti and Edward Burne-Jones, and especially by British graphic artists of the 1880s, including Selwyn Image, Heywood Sumner, Walter Crane, Alfred Gilbert, and especially Aubrey Beardsley. The chair designed by Arthur Mackmurdo has been recognized as a precursor of Art Nouveau design.

In France, it was influenced by the architectural theorist and historian Eugène Viollet-le-Duc, a declared enemy of the historical Beaux-Arts architectural style, whose theories on rationalism were derived from his study of medieval art:

- Function should define form.
- Unity of the arts and the abolition of any distinction between major art (architecture) and minor arts (decorative arts).
- Nature's logic is the model to be used for architecture.
- Architecture should adapt itself to man's environment and needs.
- Use of modern technologies and materials.

Viollet-le-Duc was himself a precursor of Art Nouveau: in 1851, at Notre-Dame de Paris, he created a series of mural paintings typical of the style. These paintings were removed in 1945 as deemed non academic. At the Château de Roquetaillade in the Bordeaux region, his interior decorations dating from 1865 also anticipate Art Nouveau. In his 1872 book Entretiens sur l'architecture, he wrote, "Use the means and knowledge given to us by our times, without the intervening traditions which are no longer viable today, and in that way we can inaugurate a new architecture. For each function its material; for each material its form and its ornament." This book influenced a generation of architects, including Louis Sullivan, Victor Horta, Hector Guimard, and Antoni Gaudí.

The French painters Maurice Denis, Pierre Bonnard, and Édouard Vuillard played an important part in integrating fine arts painting with decoration. "I believe that before everything a painting must decorate", Denis wrote in 1891. "The choice of subjects or scenes is nothing. It is by the value of tones, the coloured surface and the harmony of lines that I can reach the spirit and wake up the emotions." These painters all did both traditional painting and decorative painting on screens, in glass, and in other media.

Another important influence on the new style was Japonism. This was a wave of enthusiasm for Japanese woodblock printing, particularly the works of Hiroshige, Hokusai, and Utagawa Kunisada, which were imported into Europe beginning in the 1870s. The enterprising Siegfried Bing founded a monthly journal, Le Japon artistique in 1888, and published thirty-six issues before it ended in 1891. It influenced both collectors and artists, including Gustav Klimt. The stylised features of Japanese prints appeared in Art Nouveau graphics, porcelain, jewellery, and furniture. Since the beginning of 1860, a Far Eastern influence suddenly manifested. In 1862, art lovers from London or Paris, could buy Japanese artworks, because in that year, Japan appeared for the first time as an exhibitor at the International Exhibition in London. Also in 1862, in Paris, La Porte Chinoise store, on Rue de Rivoli, was open, where Japanese ukiyo-e and other objects from the Far East were sold. In 1867, Examples of Chinese Ornaments by Owen Jones appeared, and in 1870 Art and Industries in Japan by R. Alcock, and two years later, O. H. Moser and T. W. Cutler published books about Japanese art. Some Art Nouveau artists, like Victor Horta, owned a collection of Far Eastern art, especially Japanese.

New technologies in printing and publishing allowed Art Nouveau to quickly reach a global audience. Art magazines, illustrated with photographs and colour lithographs, played an essential role in popularising the new style. The Studio in England, Arts et idèes and Art et décoration in France, and Jugend in Germany allowed the style to spread rapidly to all corners of Europe. Aubrey Beardsley in England, and Eugène Grasset, Henri de Toulouse-Lautrec, and Félix Vallotton achieved international recognition as illustrators. With the posters by Jules Chéret for dancer Loie Fuller in 1893, and by Alphonse Mucha for actress Sarah Bernhardt in 1895, the poster became not just advertising, but an art form. Sarah Bernhardt set aside large numbers of her posters for sale to collectors.

=== Development – Brussels (1893–1898) ===
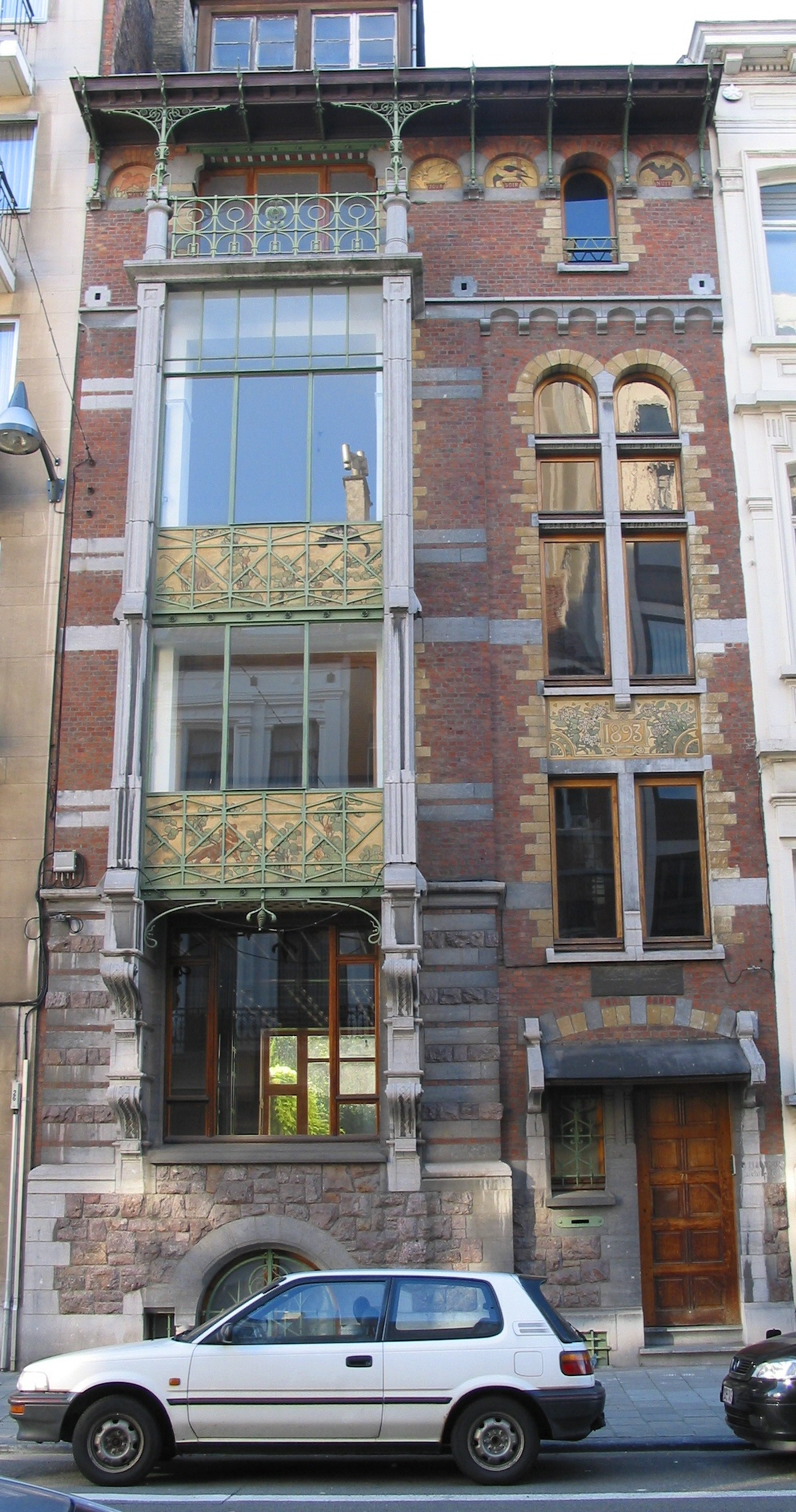
Hankar House by Paul Hankar (1893)

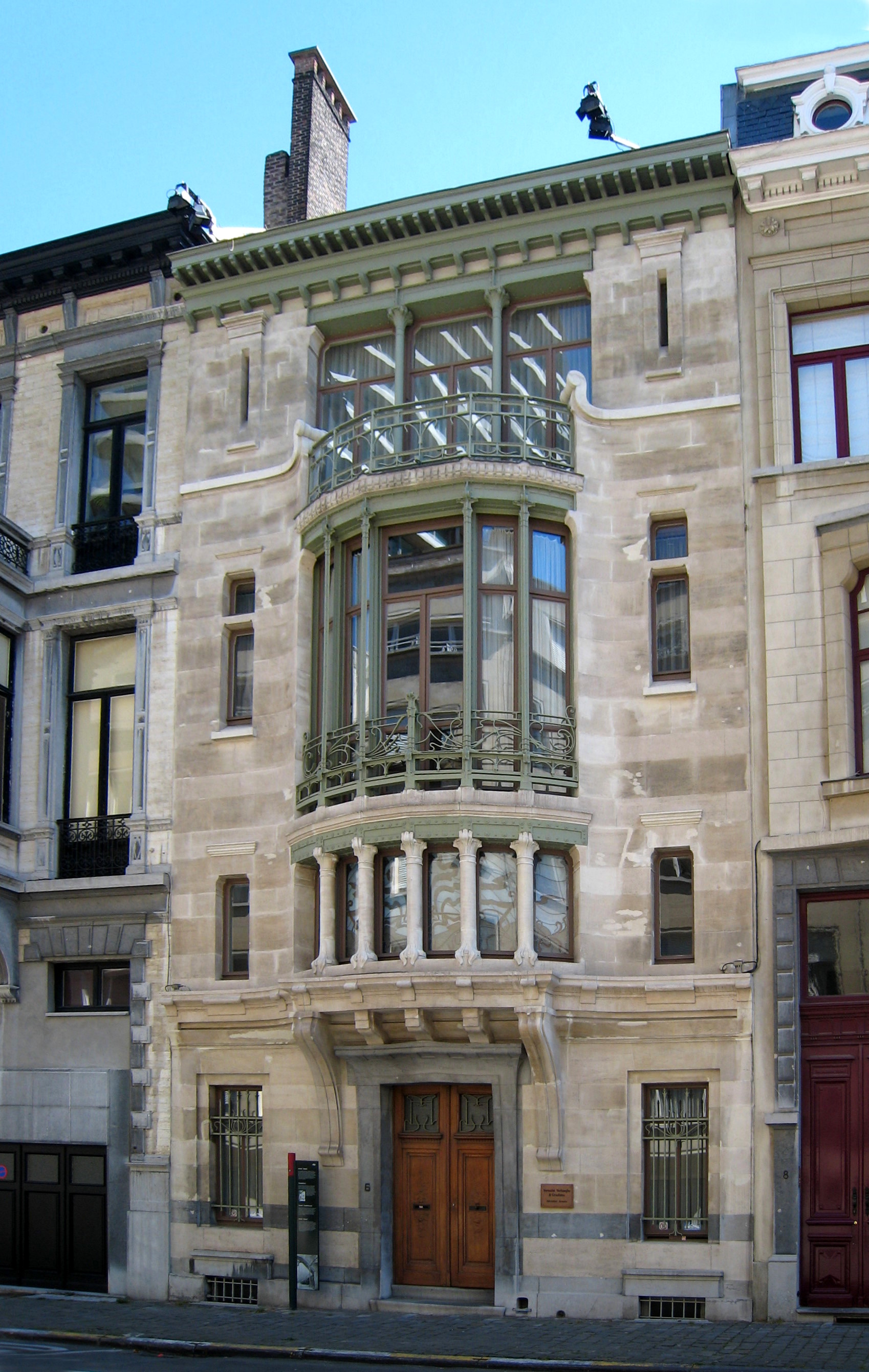
Façade of the Hôtel Tassel by Victor Horta (1892–93)

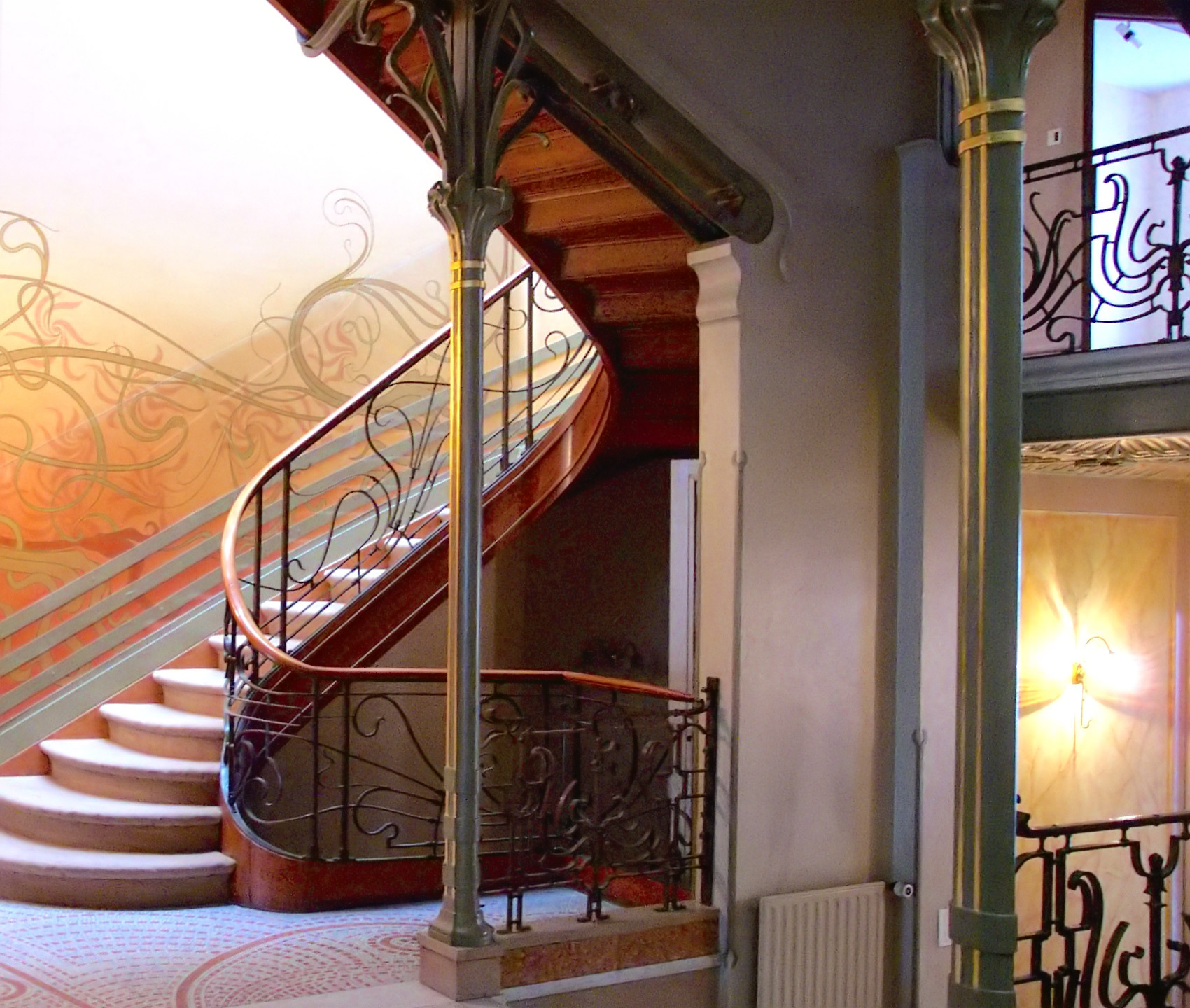
Stairway of the Hôtel Tassel

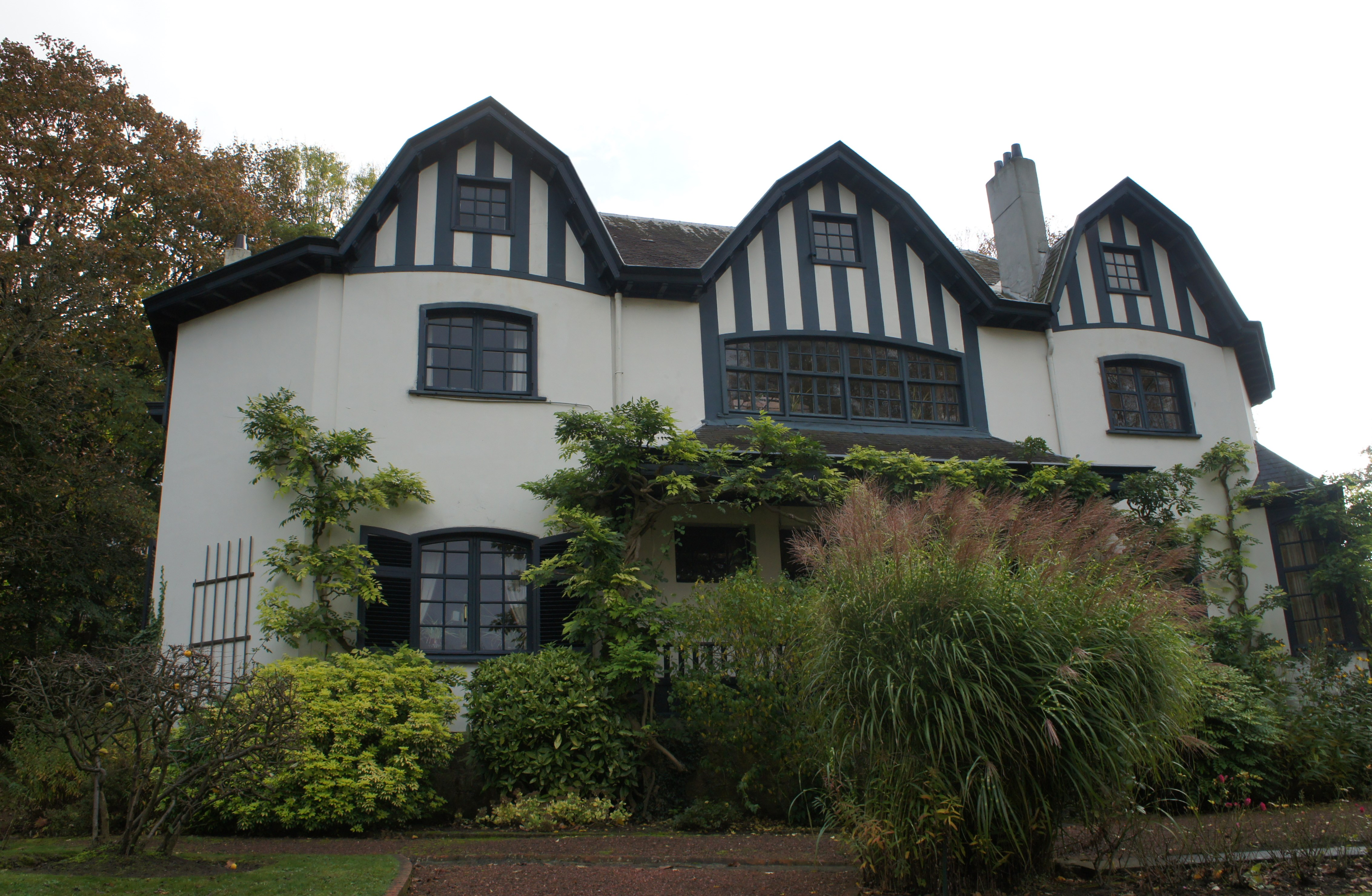
Villa Bloemenwerf by Henry van de Velde (1895)

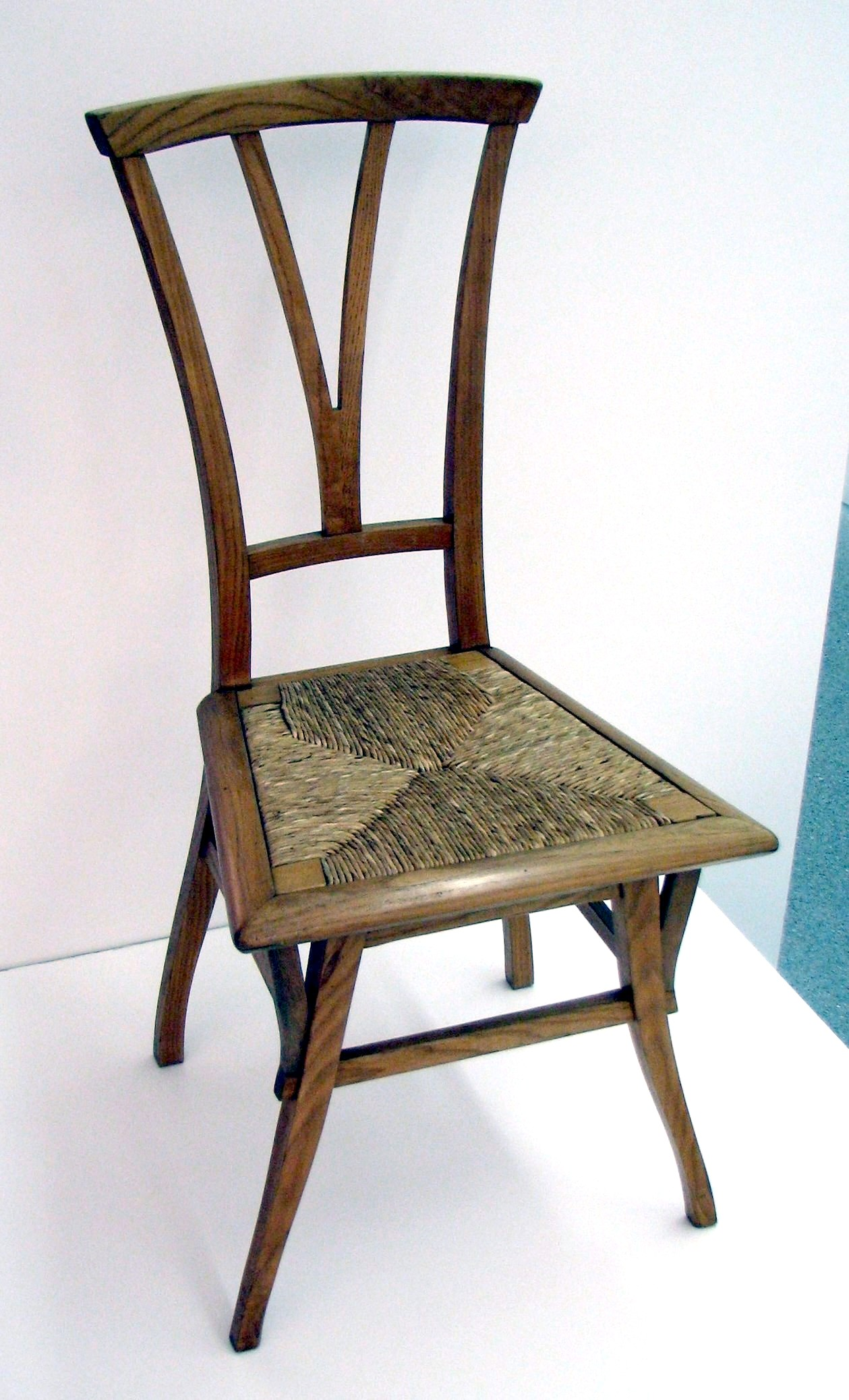
Chair by Van de Velde for the Villa Bloemenwerf (1895)

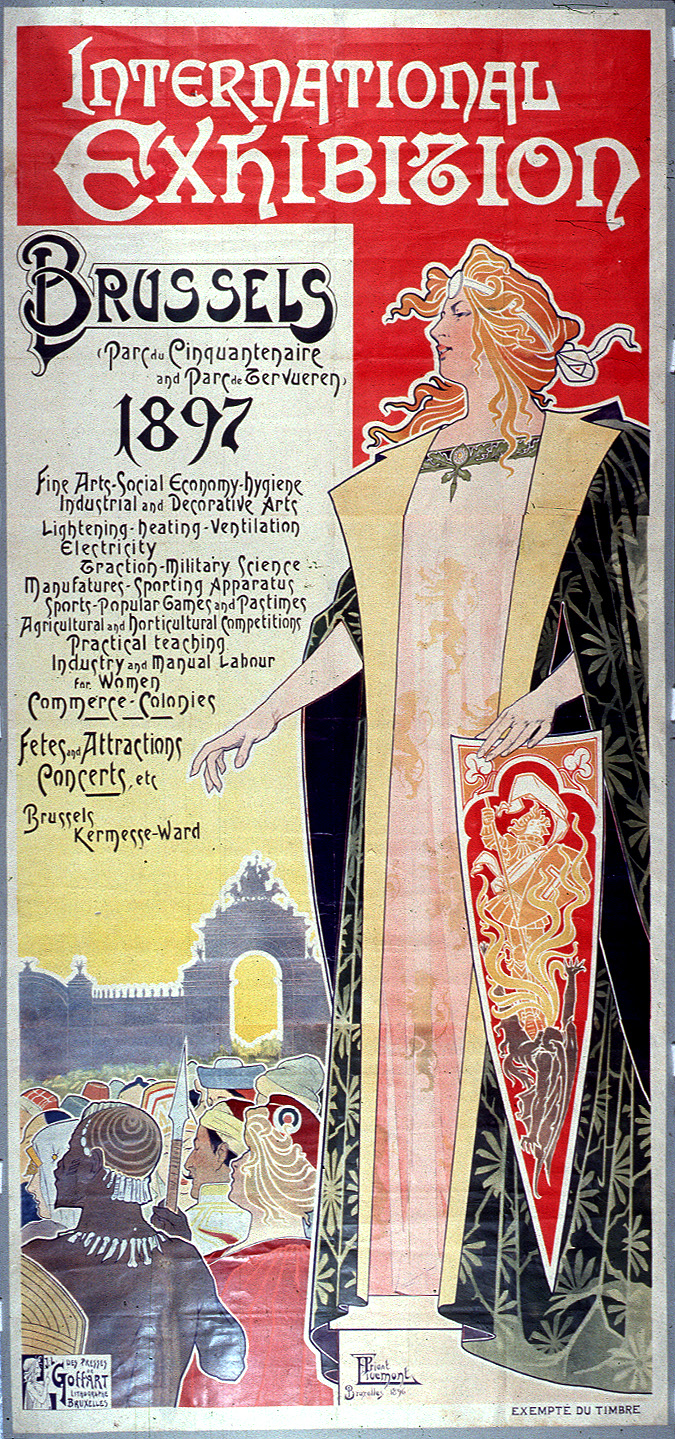
Poster for the International Exposition by Privat Livemont (1897)

The first Art Nouveau town houses, the Hankar House by Paul Hankar (1893) and the Hôtel Tassel by Victor Horta (1892–1893), were built almost simultaneously in Brussels. They were similar in their originality, but very different in their design and appearance.

Victor Horta was among the most influential architects of early Art Nouveau, and his Hôtel Tassel (1892–1893) in Brussels is one of the style's landmarks. Horta's architectural training was as an assistant to Alphonse Balat, architect to King Leopold II, constructing the monumental iron and glass Royal Greenhouses of Laeken. He was a great admiror of Viollet-le-Duc, with whose ideas he completely identified. In 1892–1893, he put this experience to a very different use. He designed the residence of the scientist and professor Émile Tassel on a very narrow and deep site. The central element of the house was the stairway, not enclosed by walls, but open, decorated with a curling wrought-iron railing, and placed beneath a high skylight. The floors were supported by slender iron columns like the trunks of trees. The mosaic floors and walls were decorated with delicate arabesques in floral and vegetal forms, which became the most popular signature of the style. In a short period, Horta built three more town houses, all with open interiors, and all with skylights for maximum interior light: the Hôtel Solvay, the Hôtel van Eetvelde (for Edmond van Eetvelde), and the Maison & Atelier Horta. All four are now part of a UNESCO World Heritage Site.

Paul Hankar was also an innovator of early Art Nouveau. Born at Frameries, in Hainaut, the son of a master stone cutter, he had studied ornamental sculpture and decoration at the Royal Academy of Fine Arts in Brussels from 1873 to 1884, whilst working as an ornamental sculptor. From 1879 to 1894, he worked in the studio of the architect Hendrik Beyaert, a master of eclectic and neoclassical architecture. Through Beyaert, Hankar also became an admirer of Viollet-le-Duc. In 1893, Hankar designed and built the Hankar House, his own residence in Brussels. With a goal to create a synthesis of fine arts and decorative arts, he brought together the sculptor René Janssens and the painter Albert Ciamberlani to decorate the interior and exterior with sgraffiti, or murals. The façade and balconies featured iron decoration and curling lines in stylised floral patterns, which became an important feature of Art Nouveau. Based on this model, he built several houses for his artist friends. He also designed a series of innovative glass display windows for Brussels shops, restaurants and galleries, in what a local critic called "a veritable delirium of originality". He died in 1901, just as the movement was beginning to receive recognition.

Henry van de Velde, born in Antwerp, was another founding figure in the birth of Art Nouveau. Van de Velde's designs included the interior of his residence in Brussels, the Villa Bloemenwerf (1895). The exterior of the house was inspired by the Red House, the residence of writer and theorist William Morris, the founder of the Arts and Crafts movement. Trained as a painter, Van de Velde turned to illustration, then to furniture design, and finally to architecture. For the Villa Bloemenwerf, he created the textiles, wallpaper, silverware, jewellery, and even clothing, that matched the style of the residence. Van de Velde went to Paris, where he designed furniture and decoration for the German-French art dealer Siegfried Bing, whose Paris gallery gave the style its name. He was also an early Art Nouveau theorist, demanding the use of dynamic, often opposing lines. Van de Velde wrote: "A line is a force like all the other elementary forces. Several lines put together but opposed have a presence as strong as several forces". In 1906, he departed Belgium for Weimar (Germany), where he founded the Grand-Ducal School of Arts and Crafts, where the teaching of historical styles was forbidden. He played an important role in the German Werkbund, before returning to Belgium.

The debut of Art Nouveau architecture in Brussels was accompanied by a wave of Decorative Art in the new style. Important artists included Gustave Strauven, who used wrought iron to achieve baroque effects on Brussels façades; the furniture designer Gustave Serrurier-Bovy, known for his highly original chairs and articulated metal furniture; and the jewellery designer Philippe Wolfers, who made jewellery in the form of dragonflies, butterflies, swans and serpents.

The Brussels International Exposition held in 1897 brought international attention to the style; Horta, Hankar, Van de Velde, and Serrurier-Bovy, among others, took part in the design of the fair, and Henri Privat-Livemont created the poster for the exhibition.

=== Paris – Maison de l'Art Nouveau (1895) and Castel Beranger (1895–1898) ===
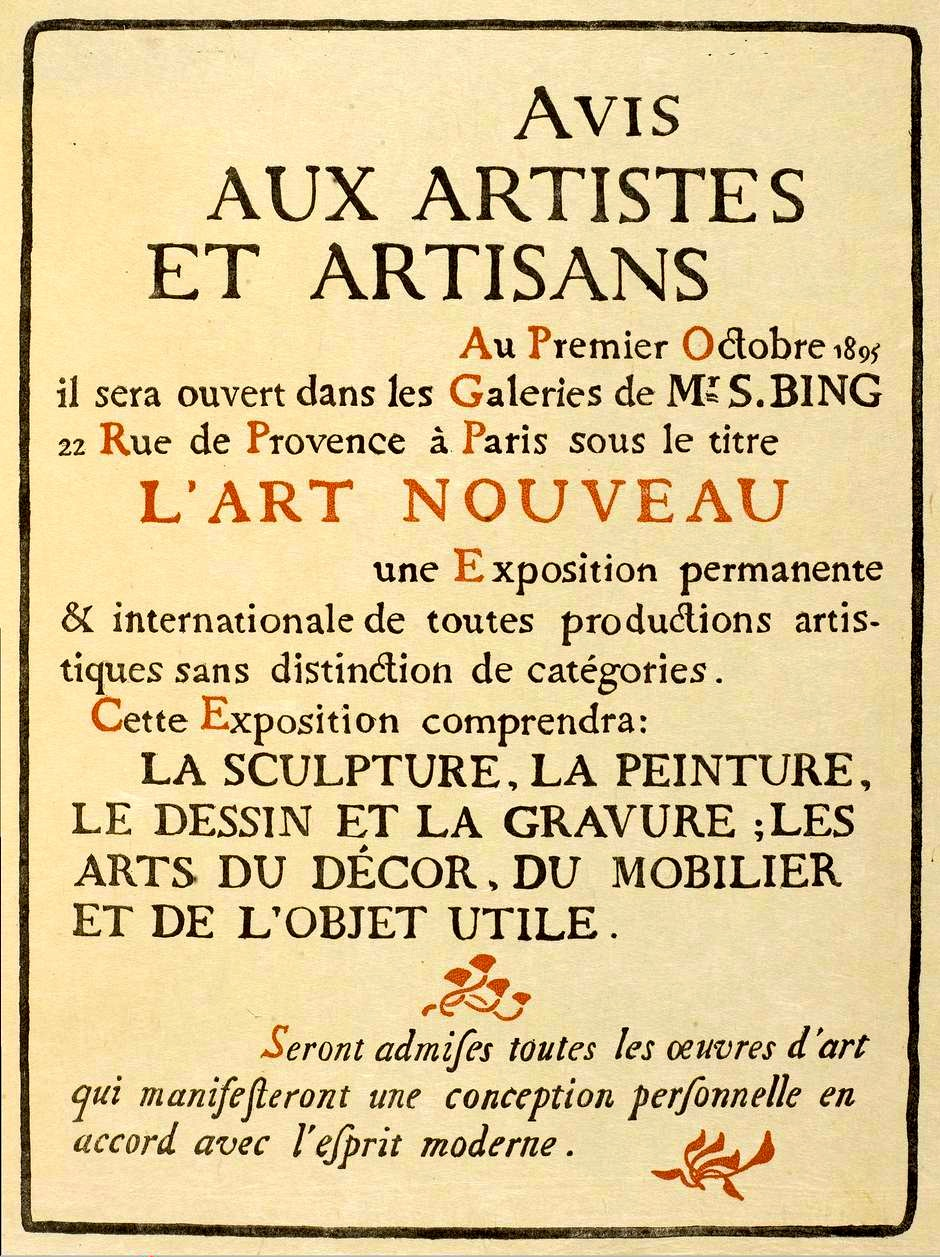
Siegfried Bing invited artists to show modern works in his new Maison de l'Art Nouveau (1895).

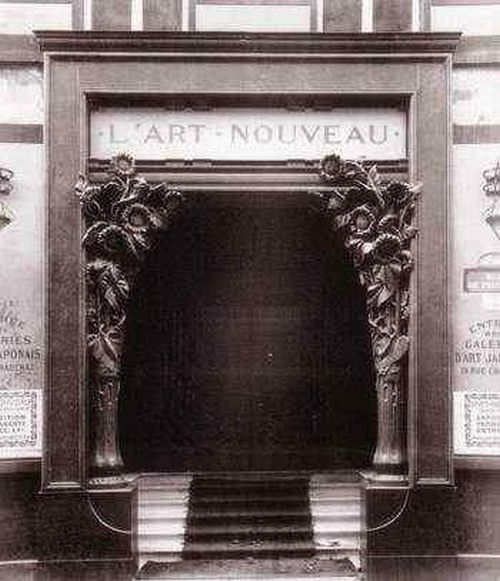
The Maison de l'Art Nouveau gallery of Siegfried Bing (1895)

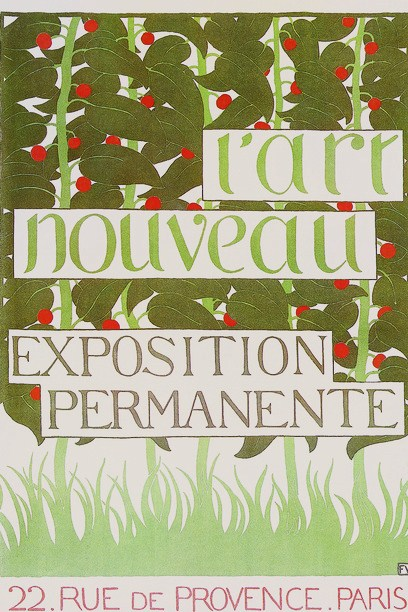
Poster by Félix Vallotton for the new Maison de l'Art Nouveau (1896)

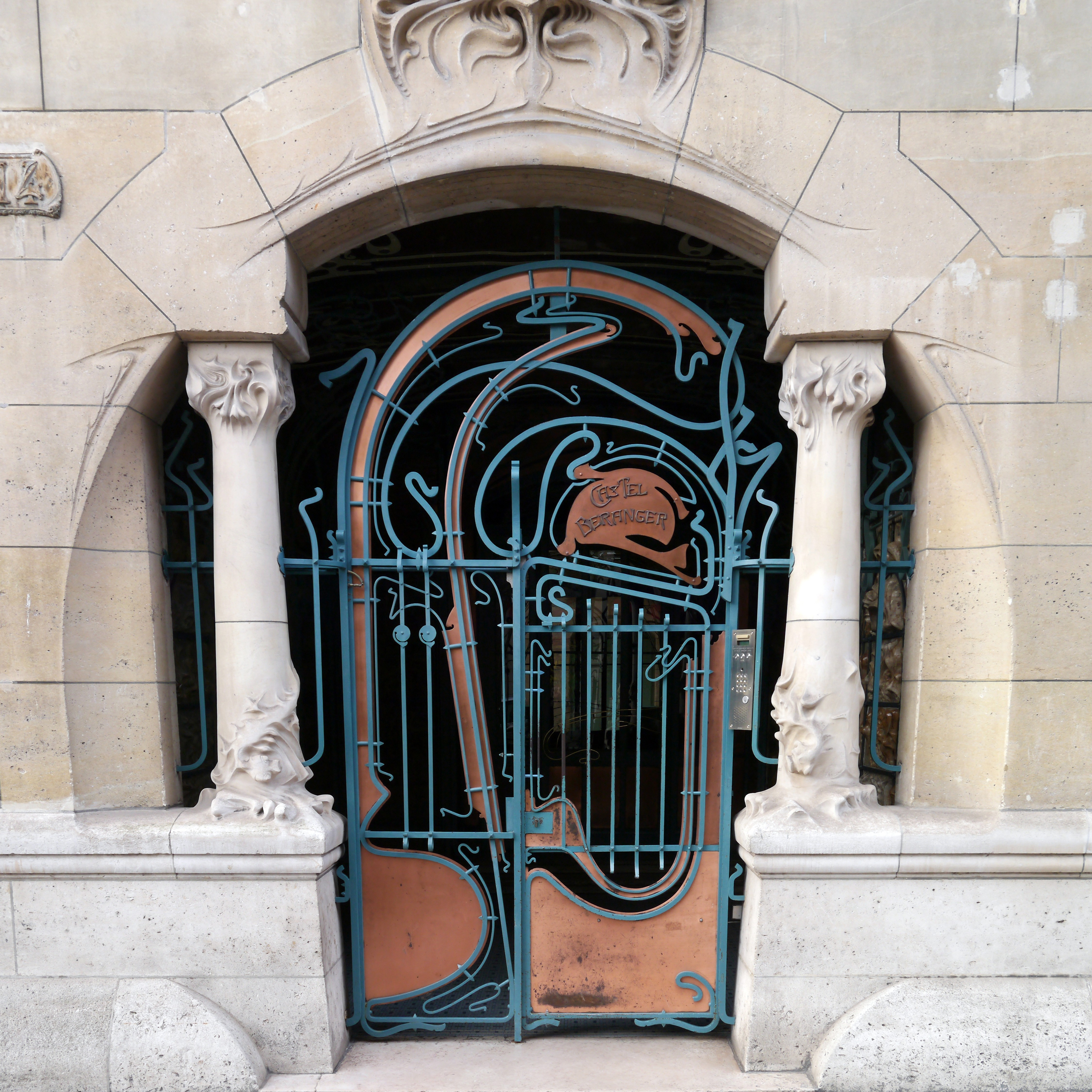
Gateway of the Castel Béranger by Hector Guimard (1895–1898)

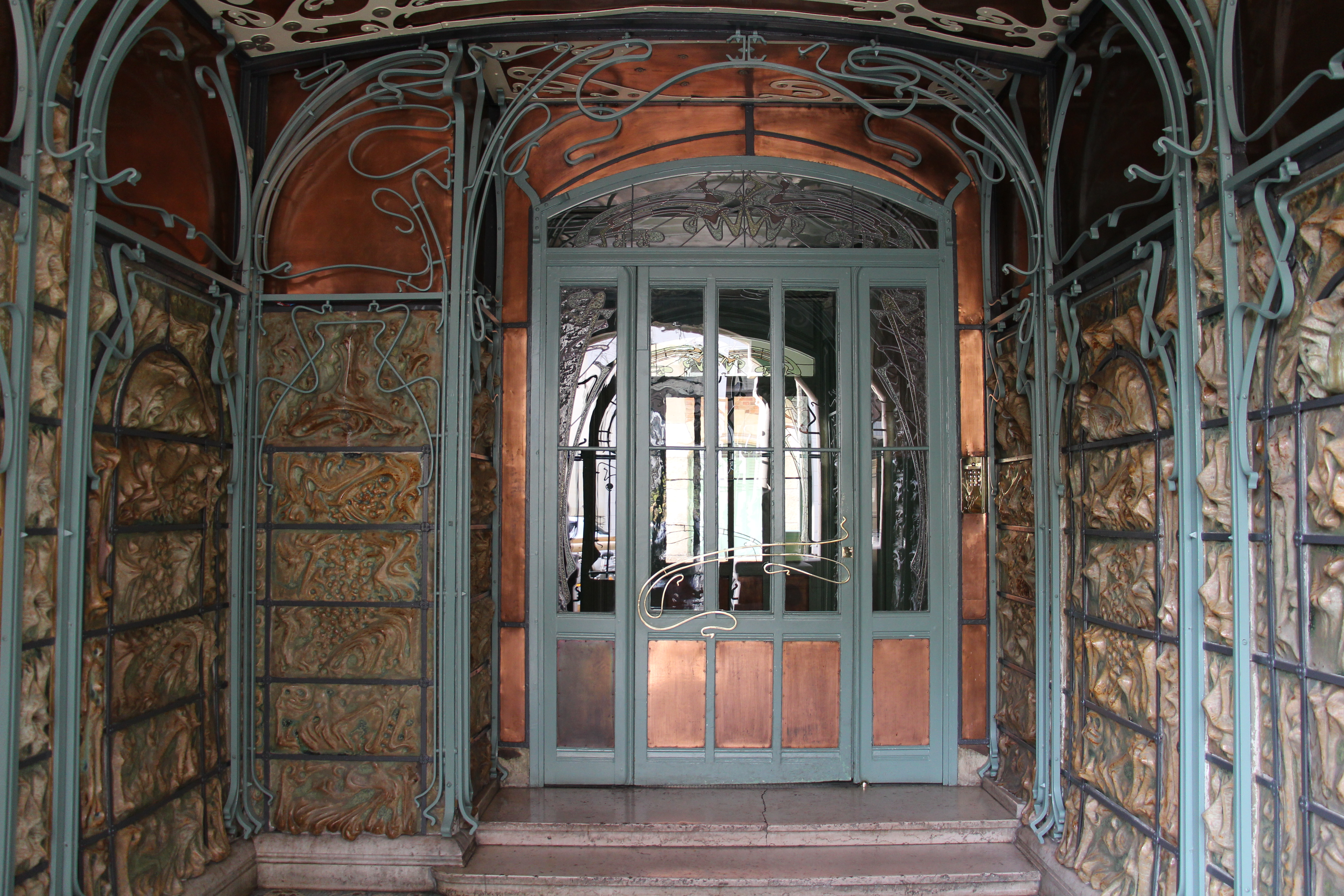
Breezeway of the Castel Béranger, with wall plates by Alexandre Bigot

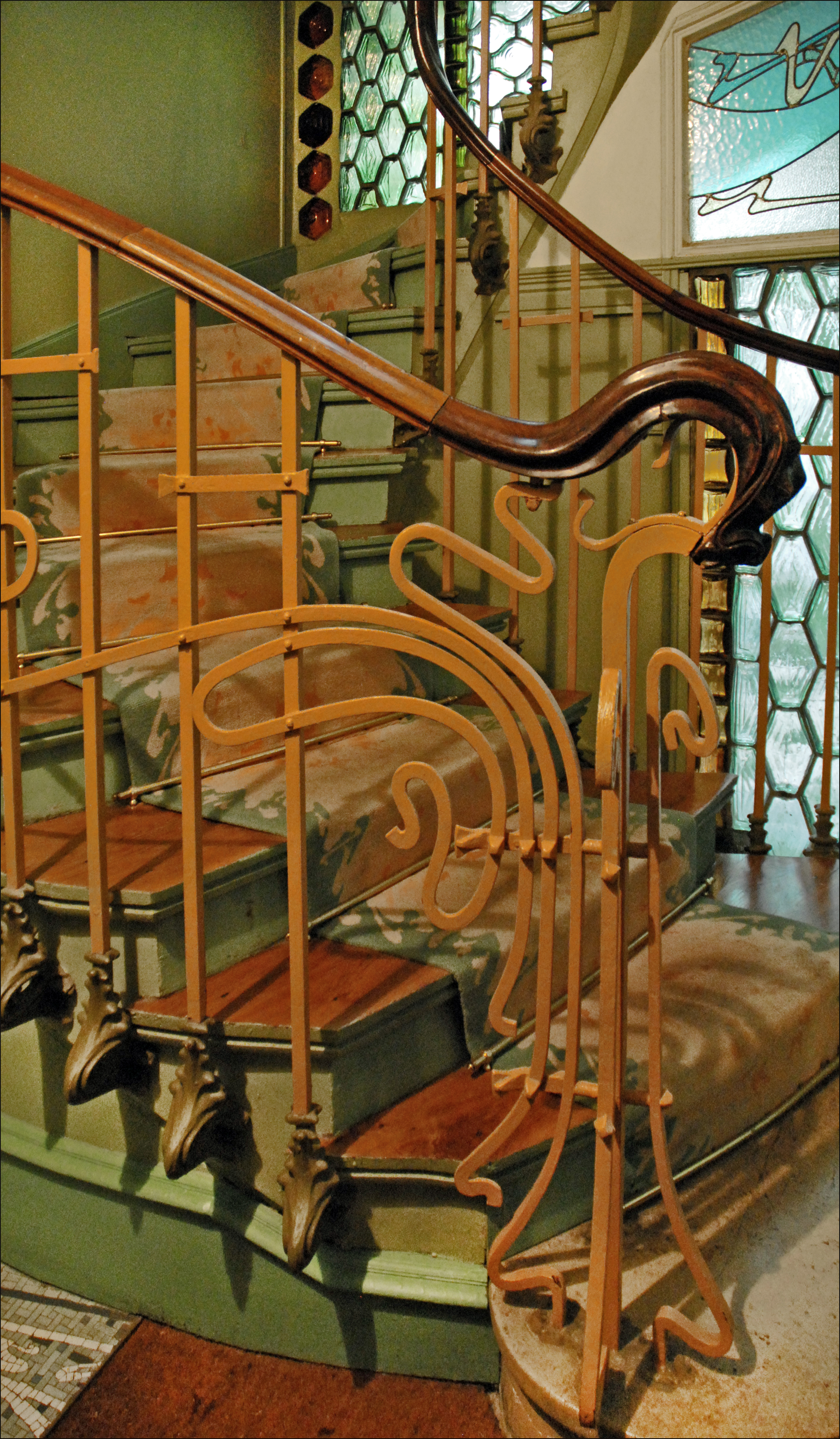
Detail of main stairway of the Castel Béranger

The Franco-German art dealer and publisher Siegfried Bing played a key role in publicising the style. In 1891, he founded a magazine devoted to the art of Japan, which helped publicise Japonism in Europe. In 1892, he organised an exhibit of seven artists, among them Pierre Bonnard, Félix Vallotton, Édouard Vuillard, Toulouse-Lautrec, and Eugène Grasset, which included both modern painting and decorative work. This exhibition was shown at the Société Nationale des Beaux-Arts in 1895. In the same year, Bing opened a new gallery at 22 Rue de Provence in Paris, the Maison de l'Art Nouveau, devoted to new works in both the fine and decorative arts. The interior and furniture of the gallery were designed by the Belgian architect Henry van de Velde, one of the pioneers of Art Nouveau architecture. The Maison de l'Art Nouveau showed paintings by Georges Seurat, Paul Signac and Toulouse-Lautrec, glass from Louis Comfort Tiffany and Émile Gallé, jewellery by René Lalique, and posters by Aubrey Beardsley. The works shown there were not at all uniform in style. Bing wrote in 1902, "Art Nouveau, at the time of its creation, did not aspire in any way to have the honor of becoming a generic term. It was simply the name of a house opened as a rallying point for all the young and ardent artists impatient to show the modernity of their tendencies."

The style was quickly noticed in neighbouring France. After visiting Horta's Hôtel Tassel, Hector Guimard built the Castel Béranger, among the first Paris buildings in the new style, between 1895 and 1898. (Note: By some researchers Hôtel Jassedé (1893) is also attributed to Art Nouveau) Parisians had been complaining of the monotony of the architecture of the boulevards built under Napoleon III by Georges-Eugène Haussmann. The Castel Béranger was a curious blend of Neo-Gothic and Art Nouveau, with curving whiplash lines and natural forms. Guimard, a skilled publicist for his work, declared: "What must be avoided at all cost is...the parallel and symmetry. Nature is the greatest builder of all, and nature makes nothing that is parallel and nothing that is symmetric."

Parisians welcomed Guimard's original and picturesque style; the Castel Béranger was chosen as one of the best new façades in Paris, launching Guimard's career. Guimard was given the commission to design the entrances for the new Paris Métro system, which brought the style to the attention of the millions of visitors to the city's 1900 Exposition Universelle.

=== Paris Exposition Universelle (1900) ===
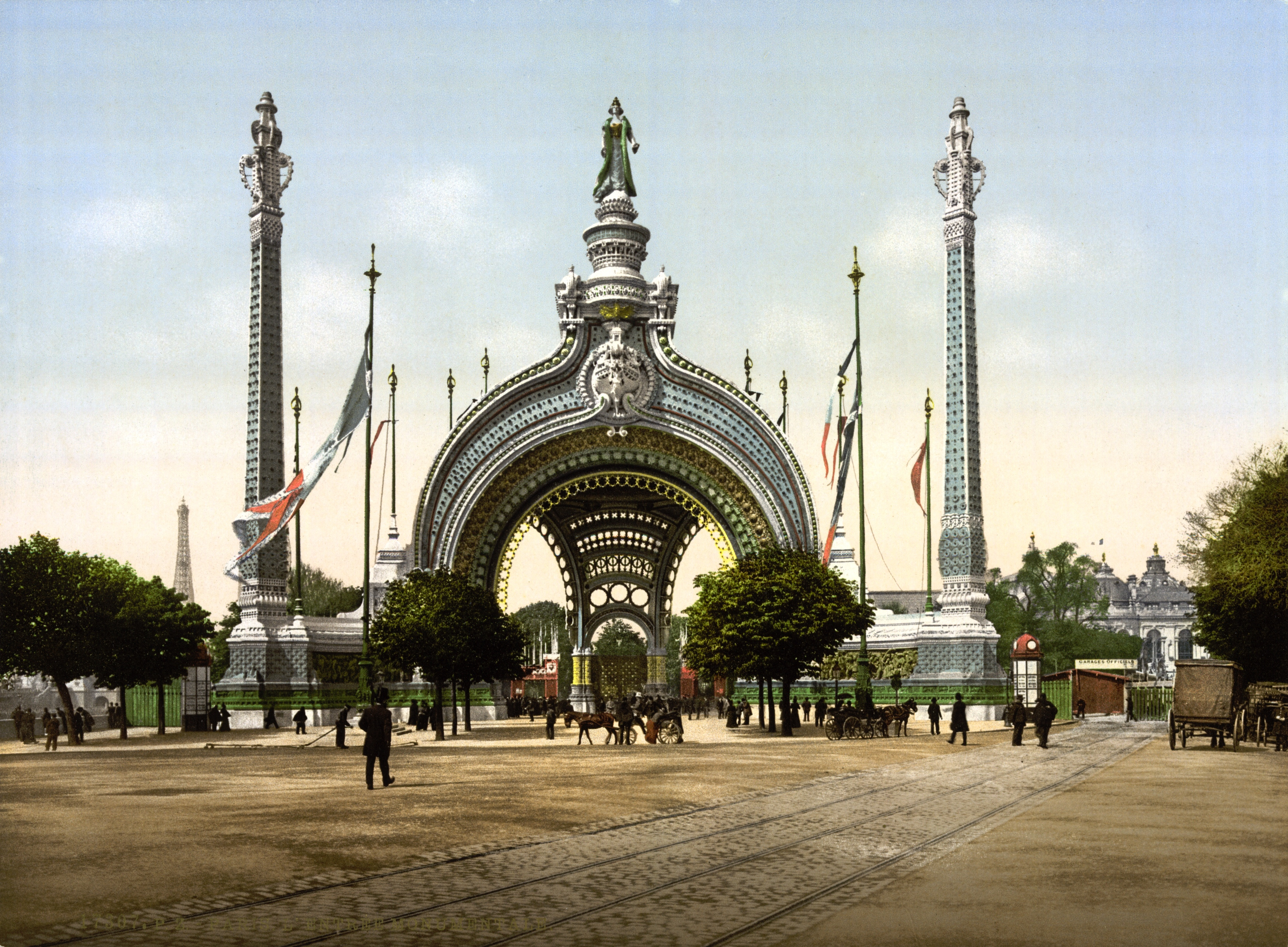
Main entrance to the Paris 1900 Exposition Universelle

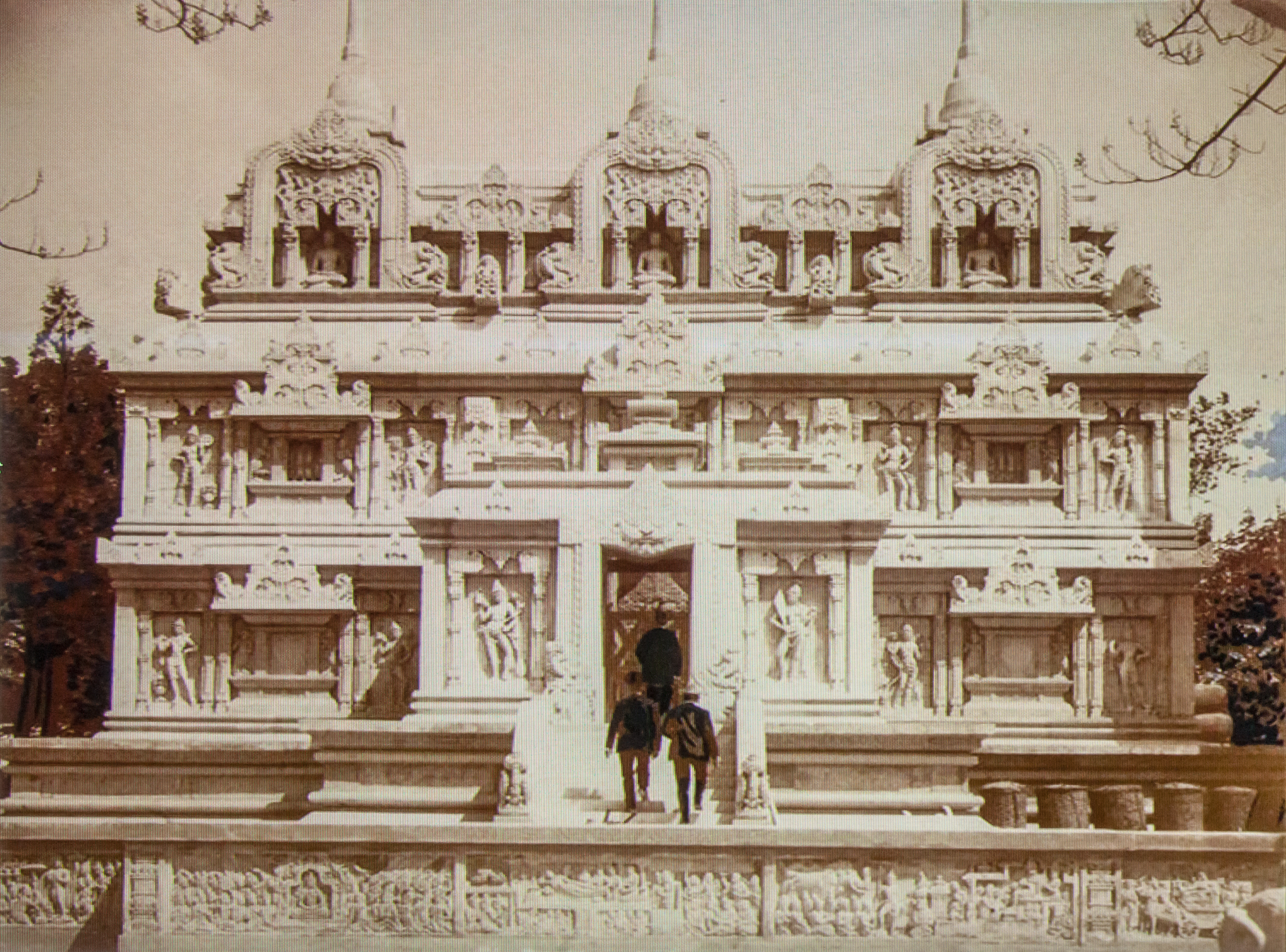
The Bigot Pavilion, showcasing the work of ceramics artist Alexandre Bigot

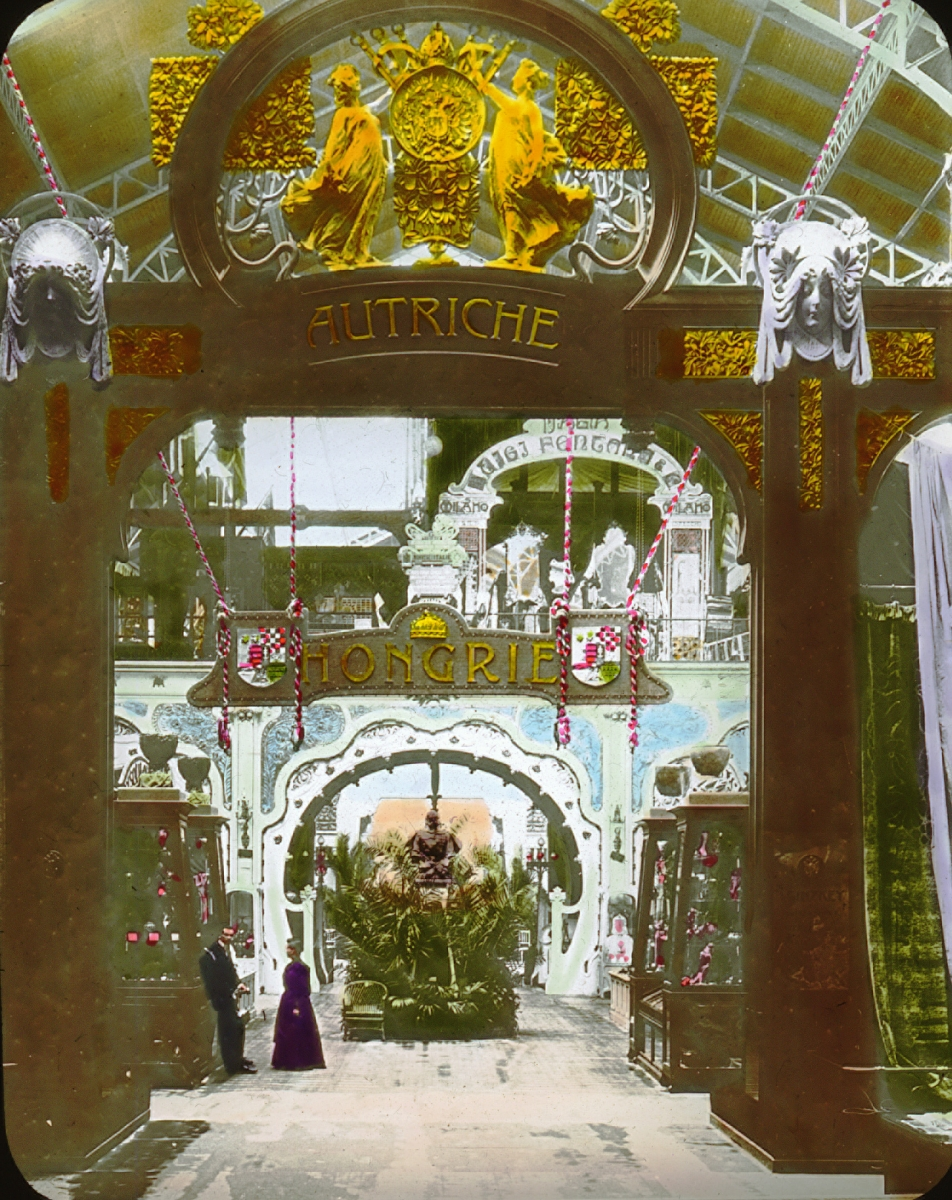
Entrance to the Austrian Pavilion, with exhibits designed by Josef Hoffmann

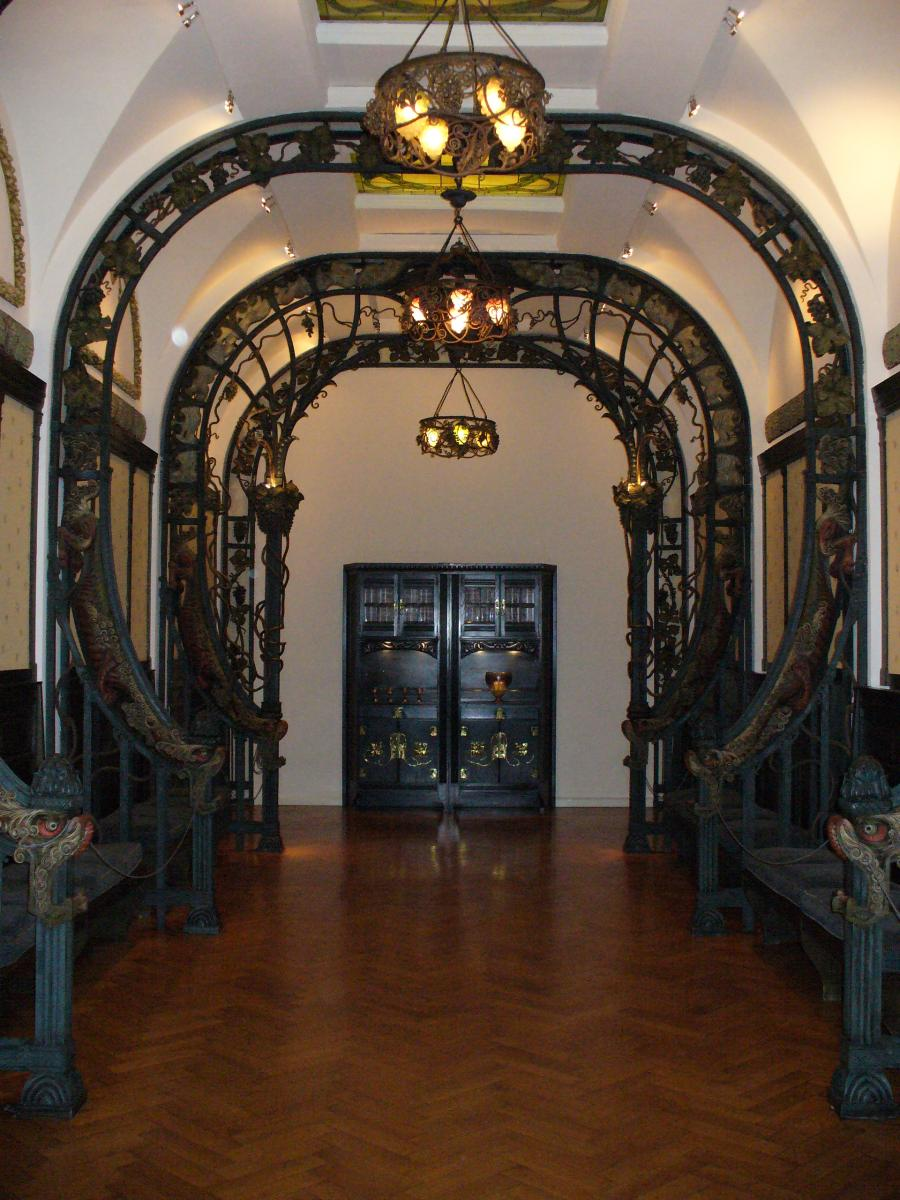
The German Pavilion, designed by Bruno Möhring

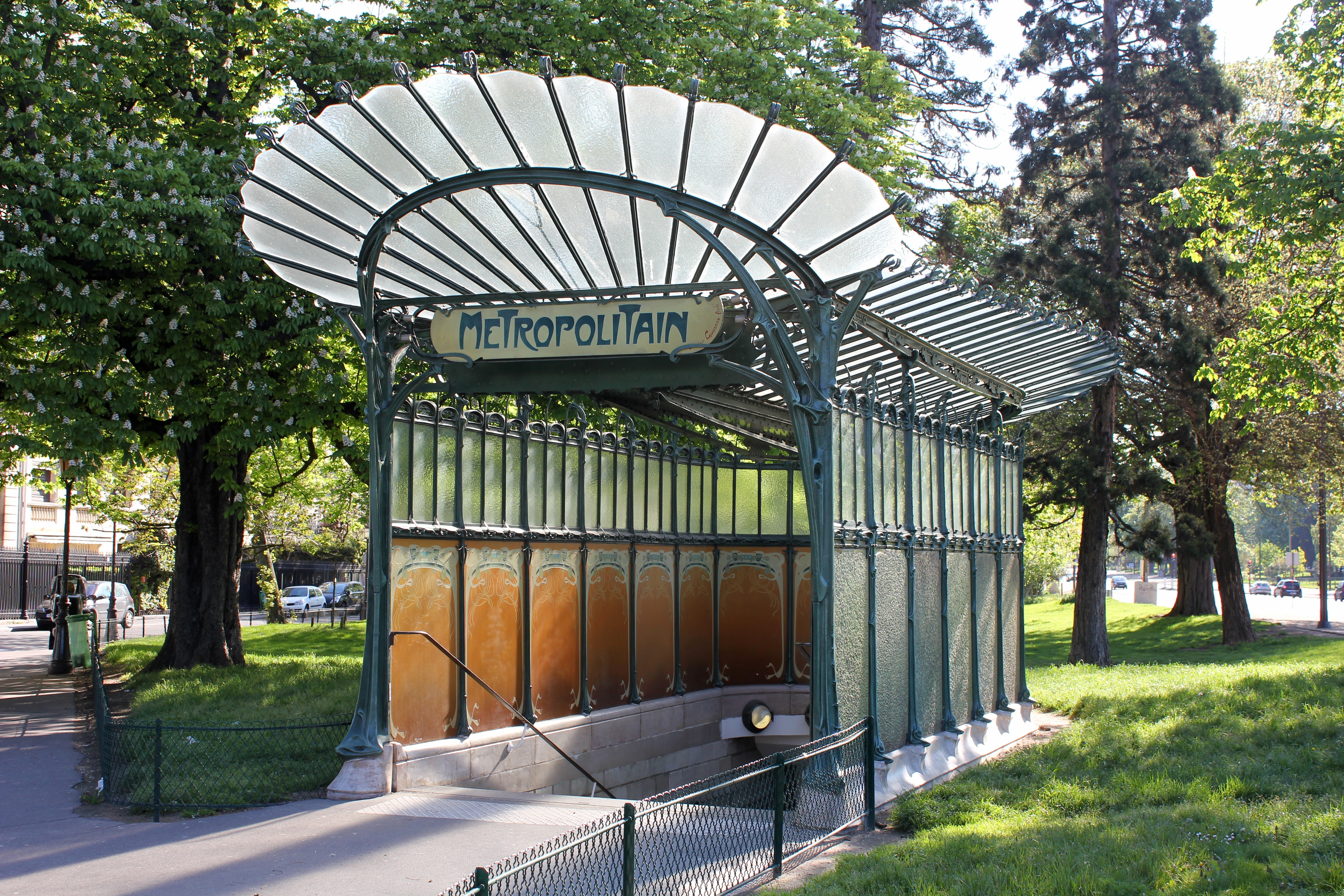
Paris metro station entrance at Porte Dauphine designed by Hector Guimard

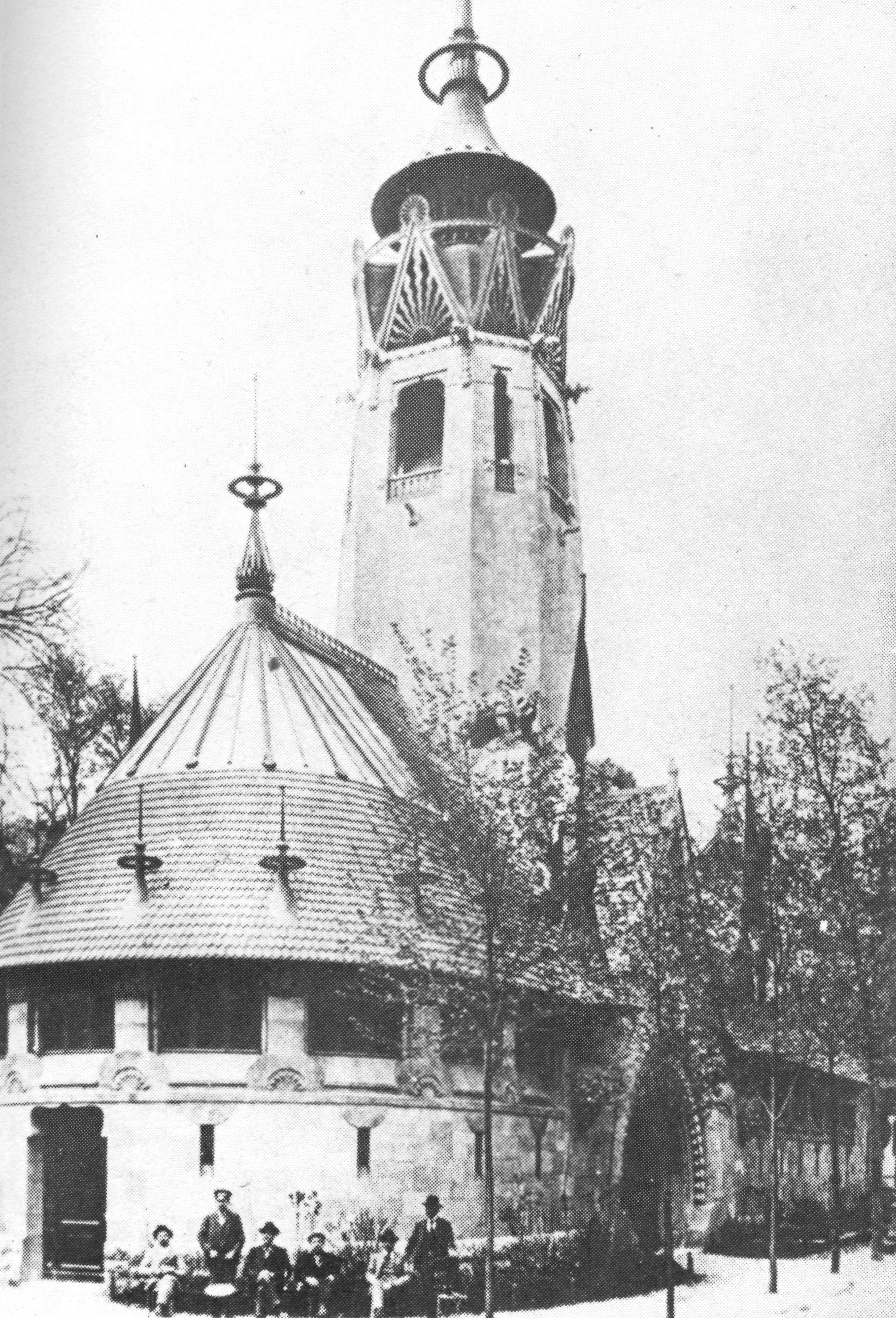
The Finnish Pavilion, designed by Armas Lindgren and Eliel Saarinen

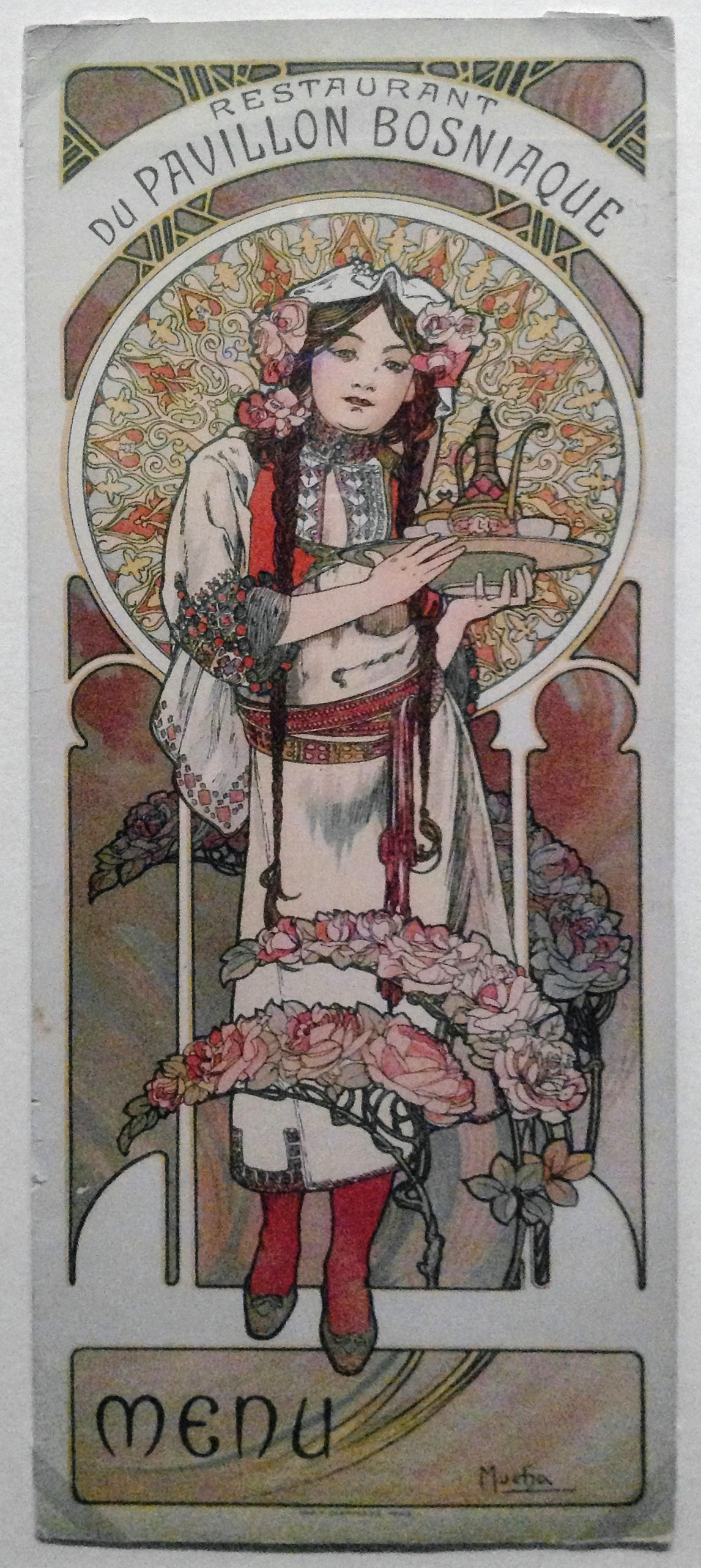
Menu designed by Alphonse Mucha for the restaurant of the Bosnian Pavilion

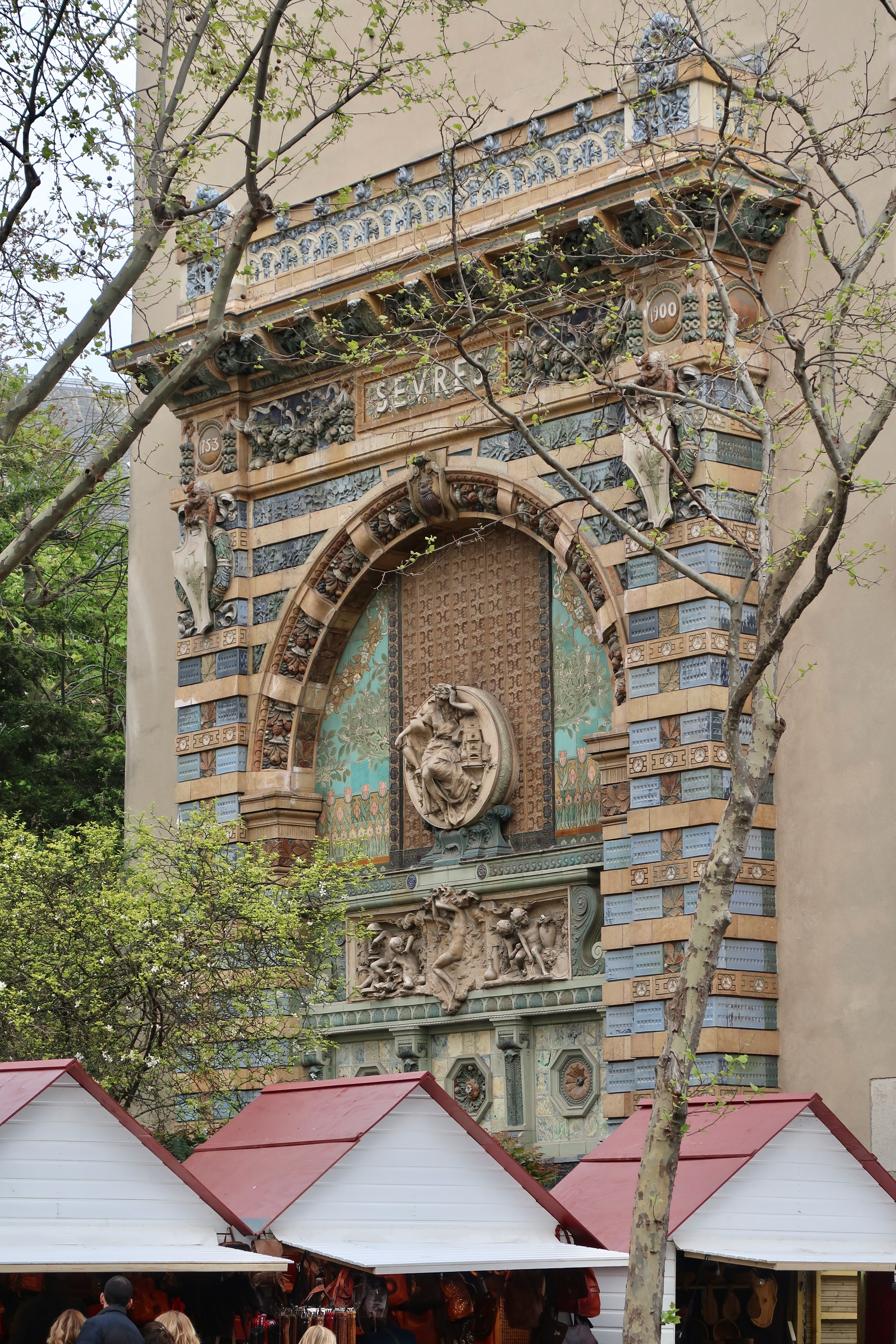
Portico of the Sevres Porcelain Pavilion, now on Square Félix-Desruelles

The Paris 1900 Exposition universelle marked the high point of Art Nouveau. Between April and November 1900, it attracted nearly fifty million visitors from around the world, and showcased the architecture, design, glassware, furniture and decorative objects of the style. The architecture of the Exposition was often a mixture of Art Nouveau and Beaux-Arts architecture: the main exhibit hall, the Grand Palais had a Beaux-Arts façade completely unrelated to the spectacular Art Nouveau stairway and exhibit hall in the interior.

French designers all made special works for the Exhibition: Lalique crystal and jewellery; jewellery by Henri Vever and Georges Fouquet; Daum glass; the Manufacture nationale de Sèvres in porcelain; ceramics by Alexandre Bigot; sculpted glass lamps and vases by Émile Gallé; furniture by Edward Colonna and Louis Majorelle; and many other prominent arts and crafts firms. At the 1900 Paris Exposition, Siegfried Bing presented a pavilion called Art Nouveau Bing, which featured six different interiors entirely decorated in the style.

The Exposition was the first international showcase for Art Nouveau designers and artists from across Europe and beyond. Prize winners and participants included Alphonse Mucha, who made murals for the pavilion of Bosnia-Herzegovina and designed the menu for the restaurant of the pavilion; the decorators and designers Bruno Paul and Bruno Möhring from Berlin; Carlo Bugatti from Turin; Bernhardt Pankok from Bavaria; The Russian architect-designer Fyodor Schechtel, and Louis Comfort Tiffany (Tiffany & Co.) from the United States. The Viennese architect Otto Wagner was a member of the jury, and presented a model of the Art Nouveau bathroom of his own town apartment in Vienna, featuring a glass bathtub. Josef Hoffmann designed the Viennese exhibit at the Paris exposition, highlighting the designs of the Vienna Secession. Eliel Saarinen first won international recognition for his imaginative design of the pavilion of Finland.

While the Paris Exposition was by far the largest, other expositions did much to popularise the style. The 1888 Barcelona Universal Exposition marked the beginning of the Modernisme style in Spain, with some buildings of Lluís Domènech i Montaner. The Esposizione internazionale d'arte decorativa moderna of 1902 in Turin, showcased designers from across Europe, including Belgian Victor Horta and Viennese Joseph Maria Olbrich, along with local Italian artists such as Carlo Bugatti, Galileo Chini, and Eugenio Quarti.

== Local variations ==
=== Art Nouveau in France ===
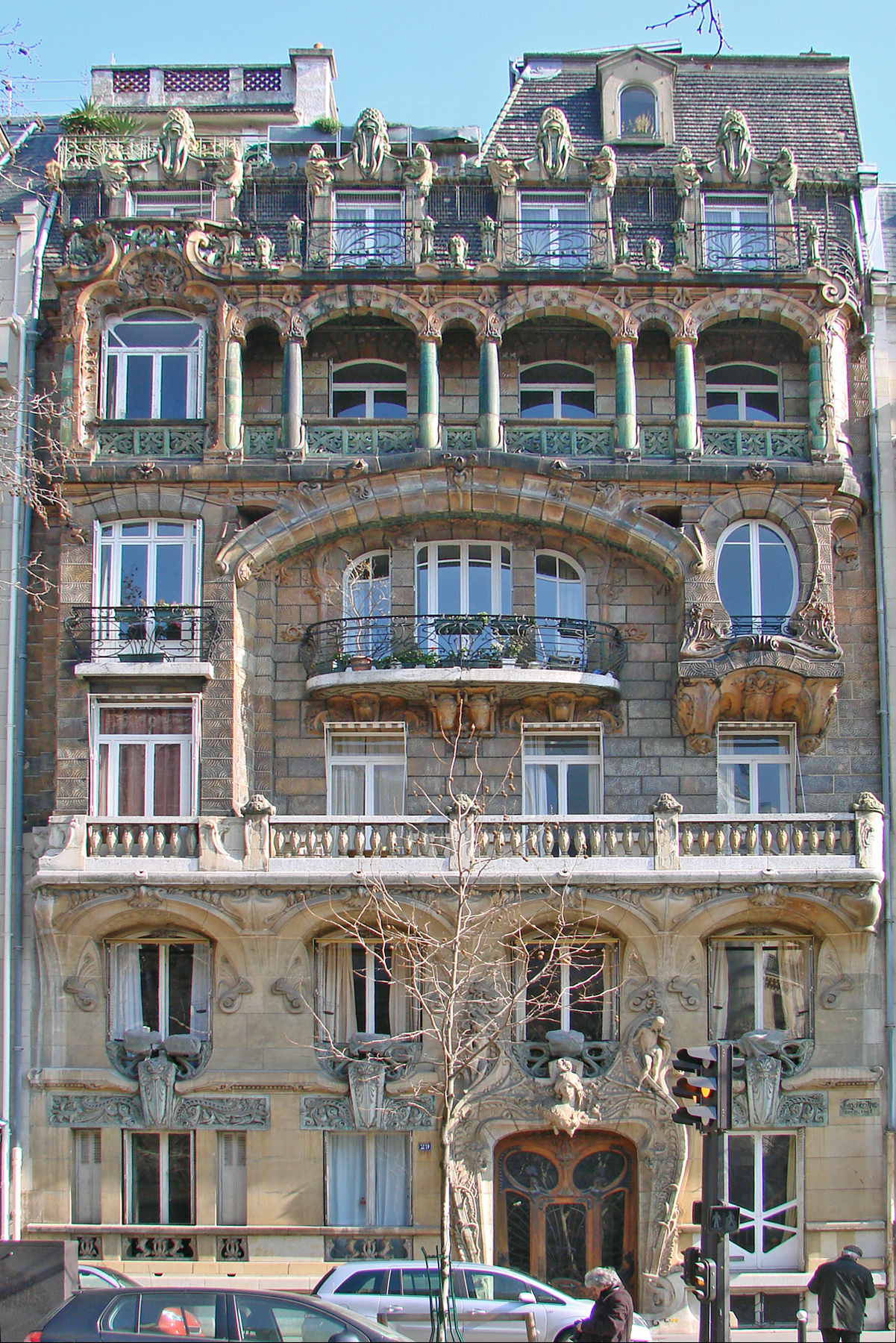
Façade of the Lavirotte Building by Jules Lavirotte at 29, avenue Rapp, Paris (1901)

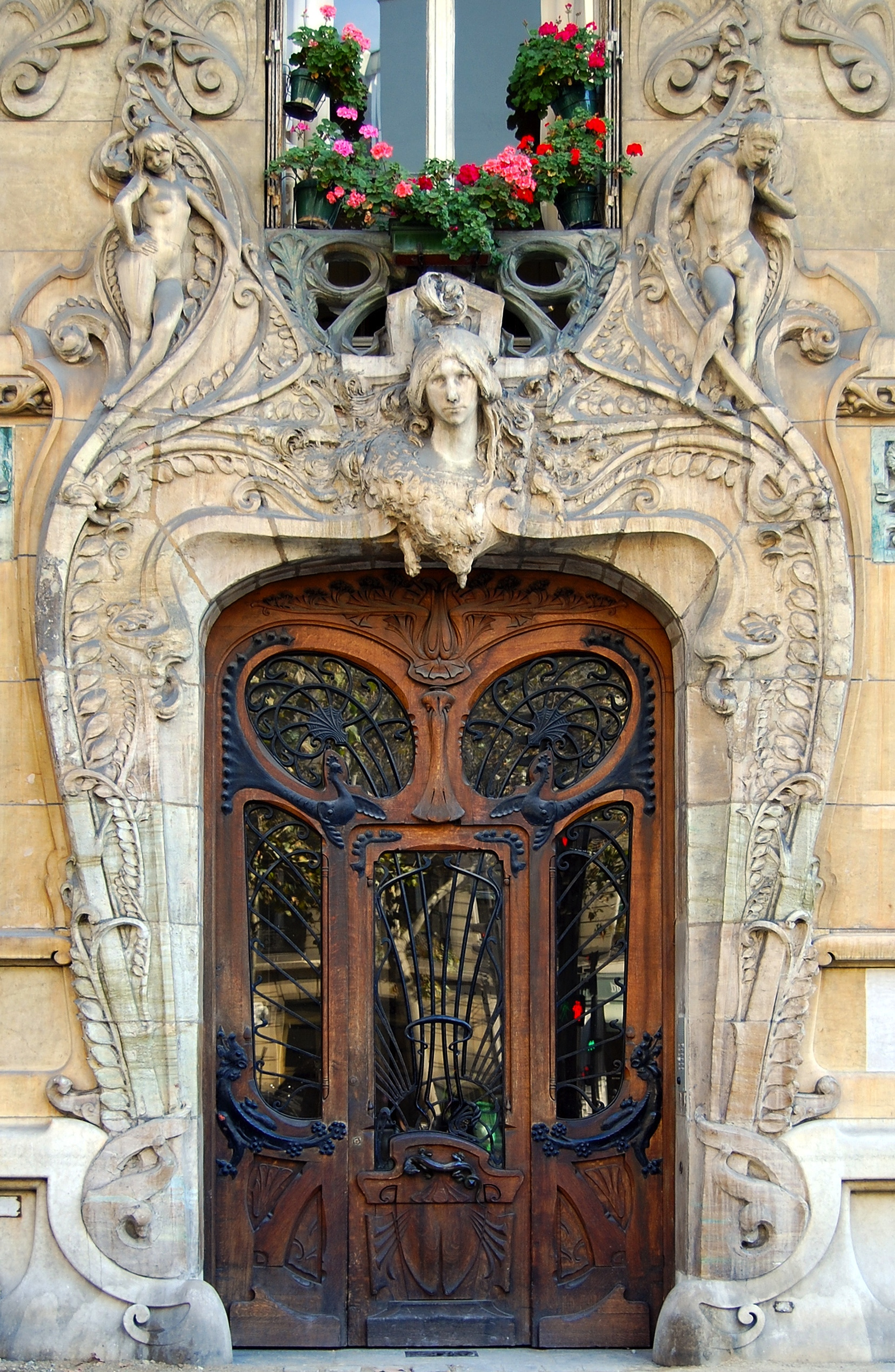
Doorway of the Lavirotte Building, with ceramic sculptures by Jean-Baptiste Larrivé

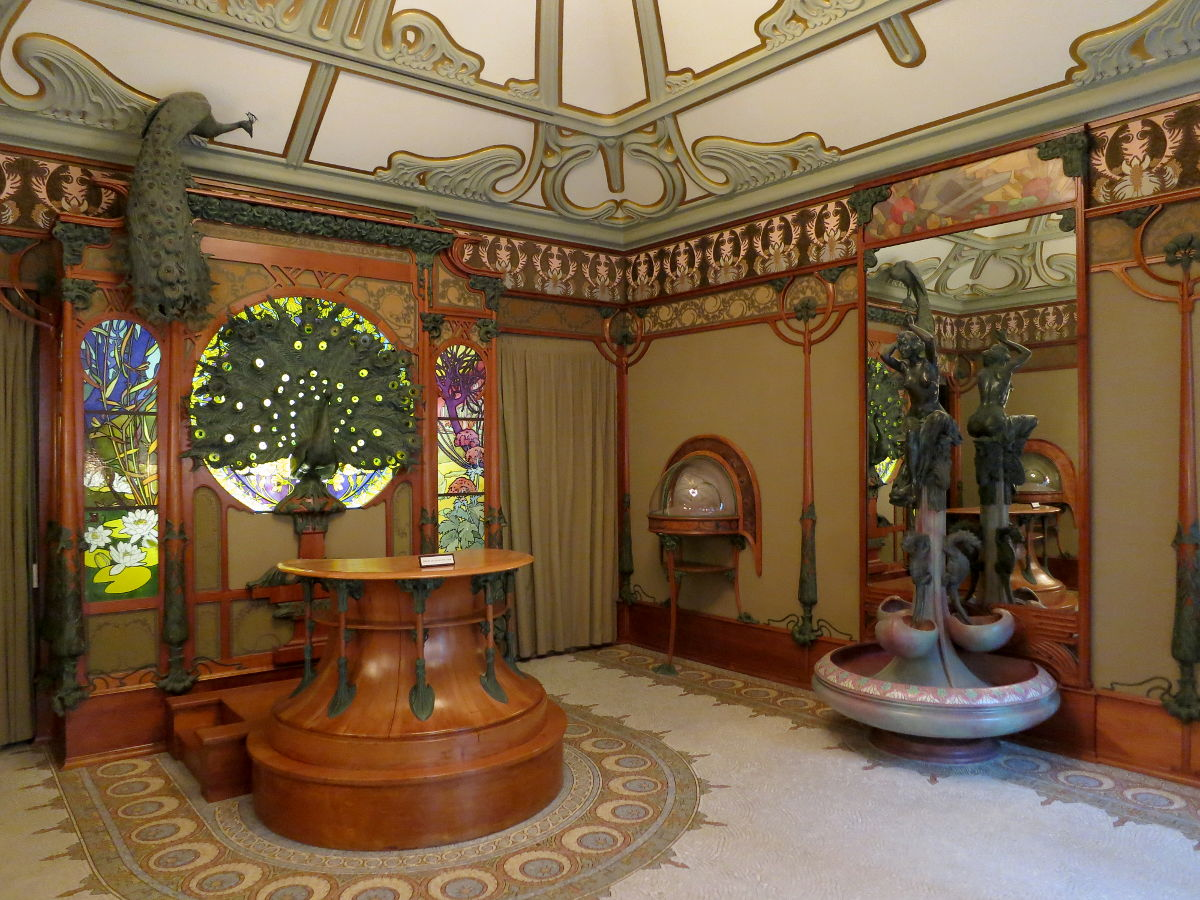
Jewellery shop of Georges Fouquet at 6, rue Royale, Paris, designed by Alphonse Mucha, now in the Carnavalet Museum (1901)

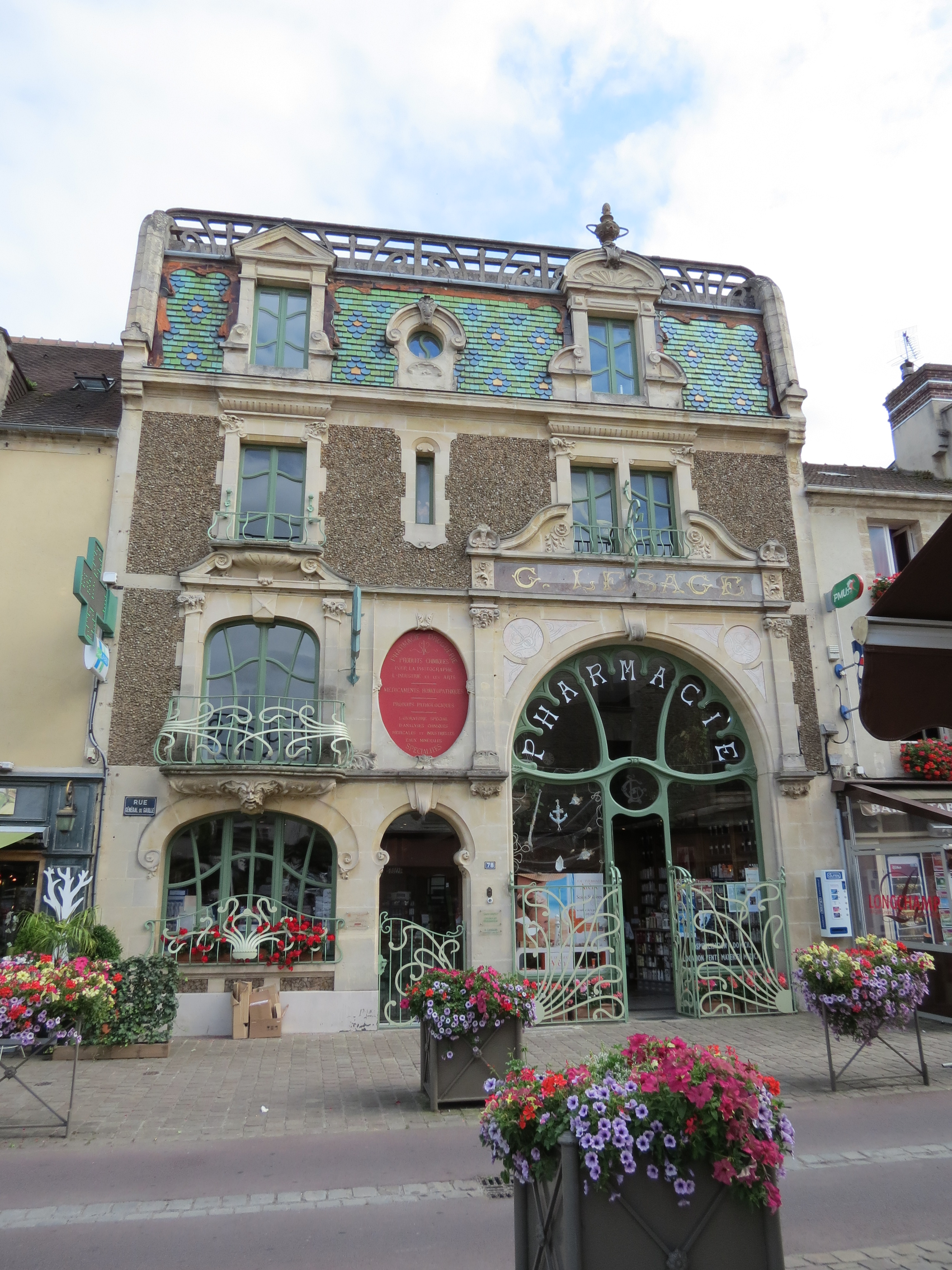
Pharmacie Lesage by François Rouvray at 78, rue du Général-de-Gaulle, Douvres-la-Délivrande (1901)

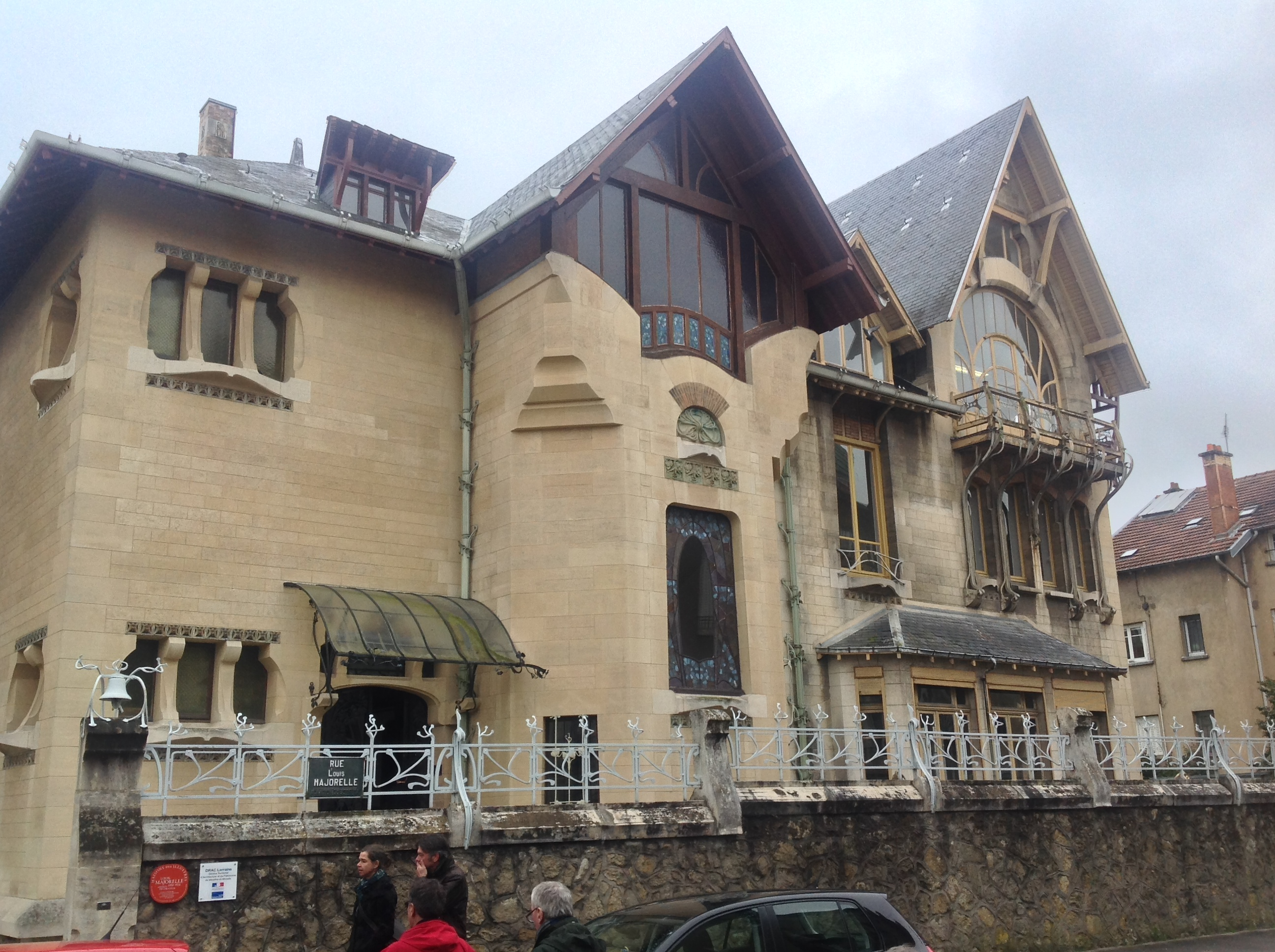
Villa Majorelle in Nancy for furniture designer Louis Majorelle by architect Henri Sauvage (1901–02)

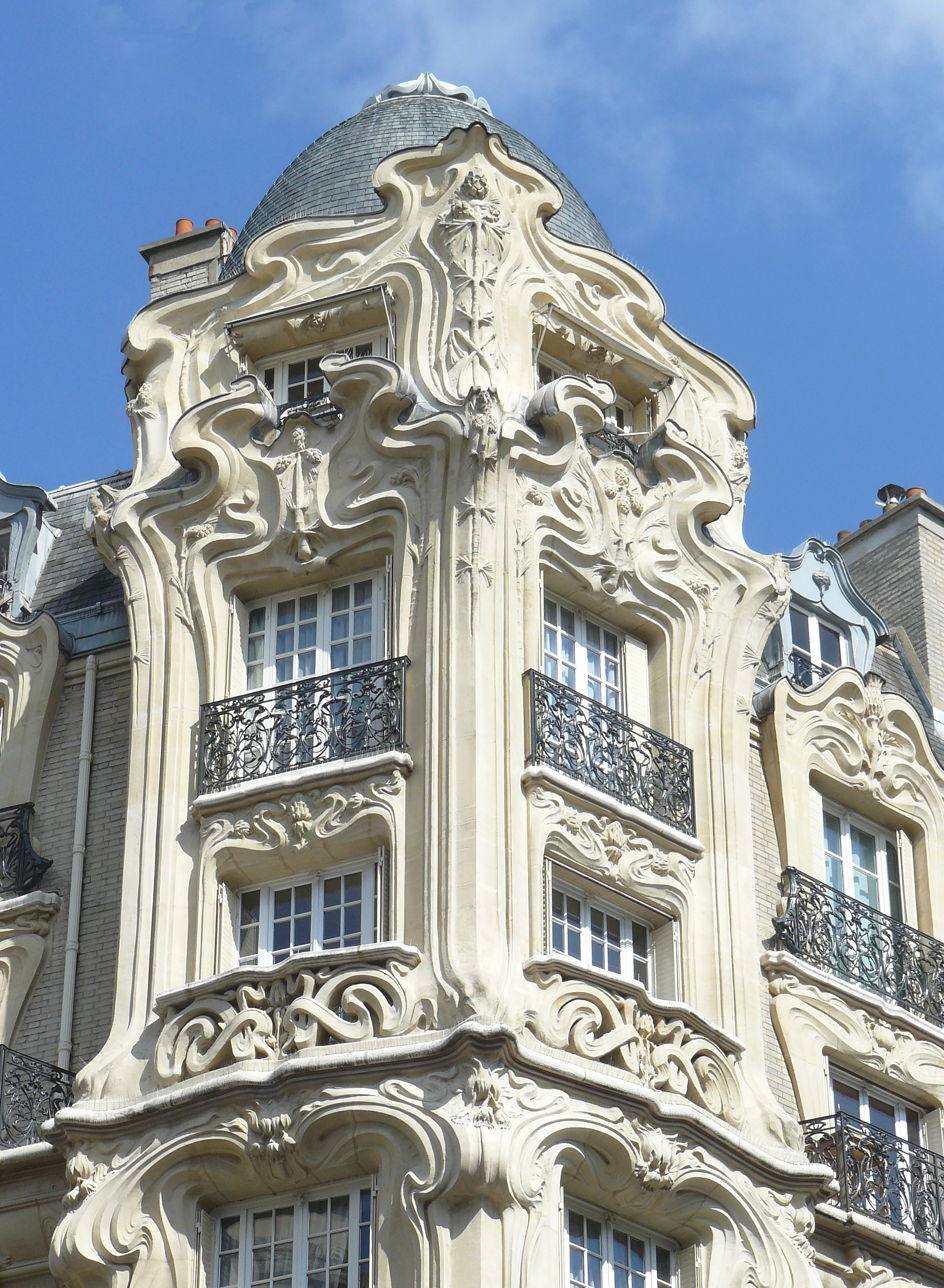
Alfred Wagon building at 24, place Étienne Pernet, Paris (1905)

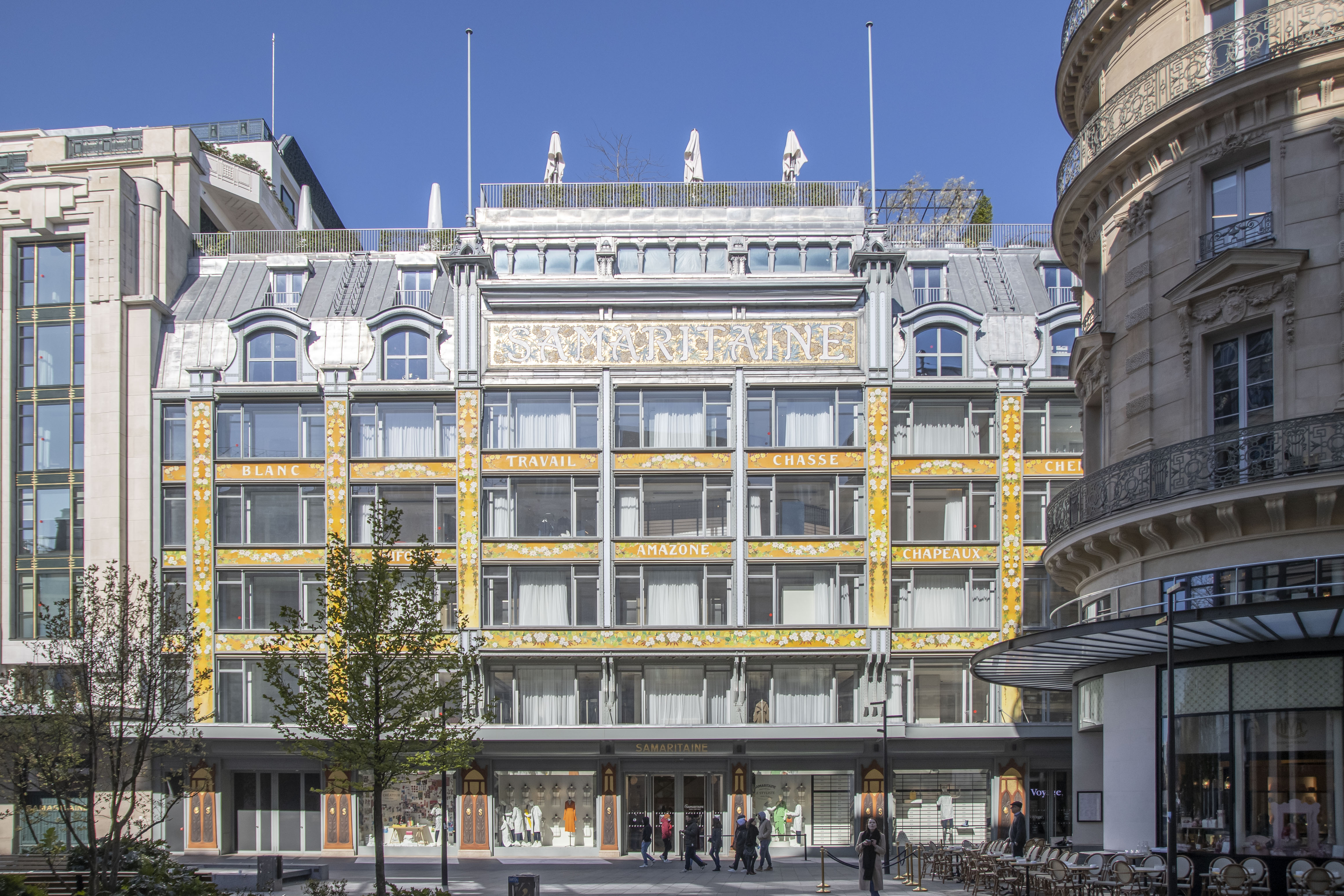
Façade of La Samaritaine department store by Frantz Jourdain, rue de la Monnaie, Paris (1905–1910)

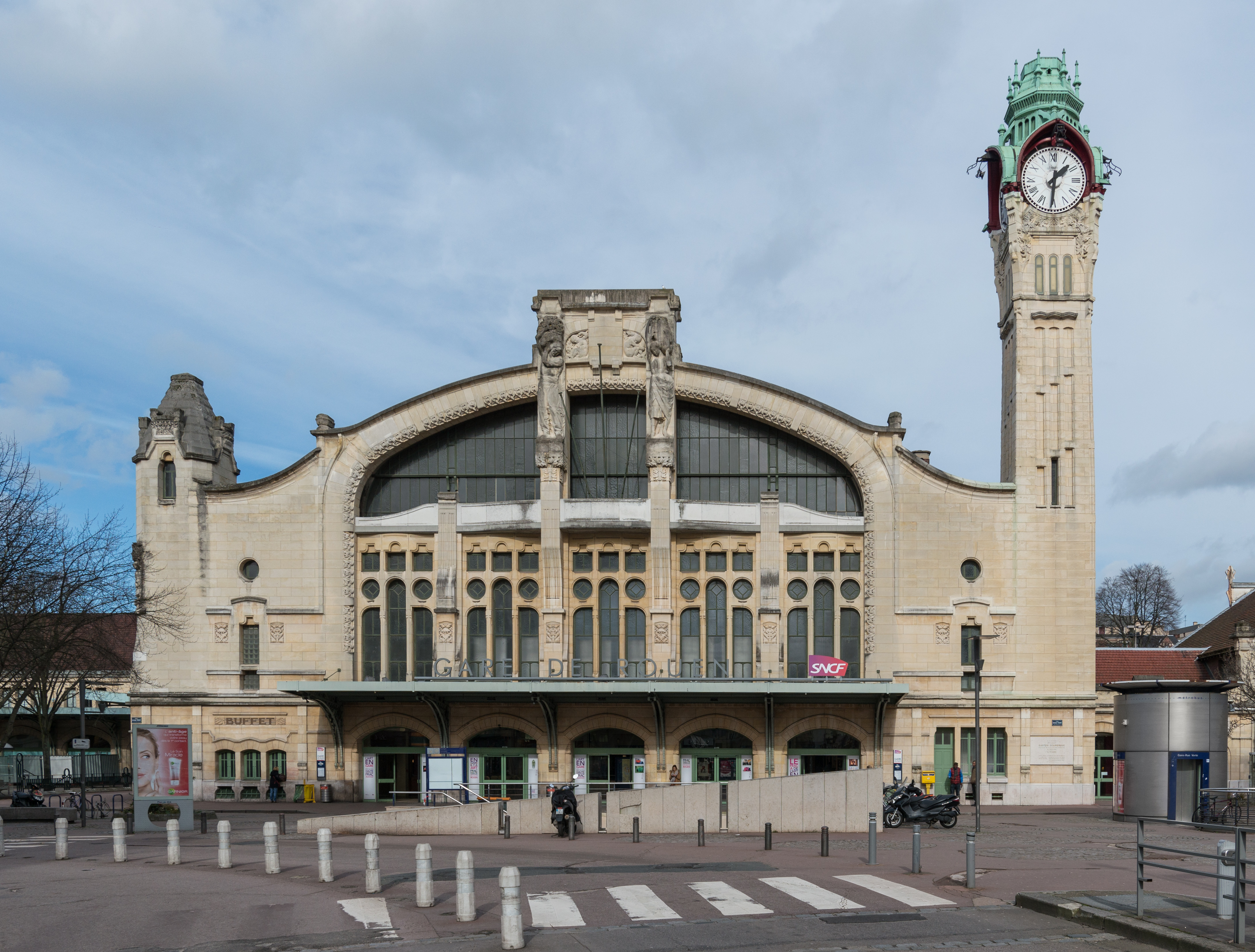
Rouen-Rive-Droite railway station by Adolphe Dervaux, with sculptures by Camille Lefèvre (1928)

Following the 1900 Exposition, the capital of Art Nouveau was Paris. The most extravagant residences in the style were built by Jules Lavirotte, who entirely covered the façades with ceramic sculptural decoration. The most flamboyant example is the Lavirotte Building, at 29, avenue Rapp (1901). Office buildings and department stores featured high courtyards covered with stained glass cupolas and ceramic decoration. The style was particularly popular in restaurants and cafés, including Maxim's at 3, rue Royale, and Le Train bleu at the Gare de Lyon (1900).

The status of Paris attracted foreign artists to the city. The Swiss-born artist Eugène Grasset was one of the first creators of French Art Nouveau posters. He helped decorate the cabaret Le Chat Noir in 1885, made his first posters for the Fêtes de Paris and a celebrated poster of Sarah Bernhardt in 1890. In Paris, he taught at the Guérin school of art (École normale d'enseignement du dessin), where his students included Augusto Giacometti and Paul Berthon. Swiss-born Théophile-Alexandre Steinlen created the poster for the Paris cabaret Le Chat noir in 1896. The Czech artist Alphonse Mucha (1860–1939) arrived in Paris in 1888, and in 1895, made a poster for actress Sarah Bernhardt in the play Gismonda by Victorien Sardou in Théâtre de la Renaissance. The success of this poster led to a contract to produce posters for six more plays by Bernhardt.

The city of Nancy in Lorraine became the other French capital of the new style. In 1901, the Alliance provinciale des industries d'art, also known as the École de Nancy, was founded, dedicated to upsetting the hierarchy that put painting and sculpture above the decorative arts. The major artists working there included the glass vase and lamp creators Émile Gallé, the Daum brothers in glass design, and the designer Louis Majorelle, who created furniture with graceful floral and vegetal forms. The architect Henri Sauvage brought the new architectural style to Nancy with his Villa Majorelle in 1902.

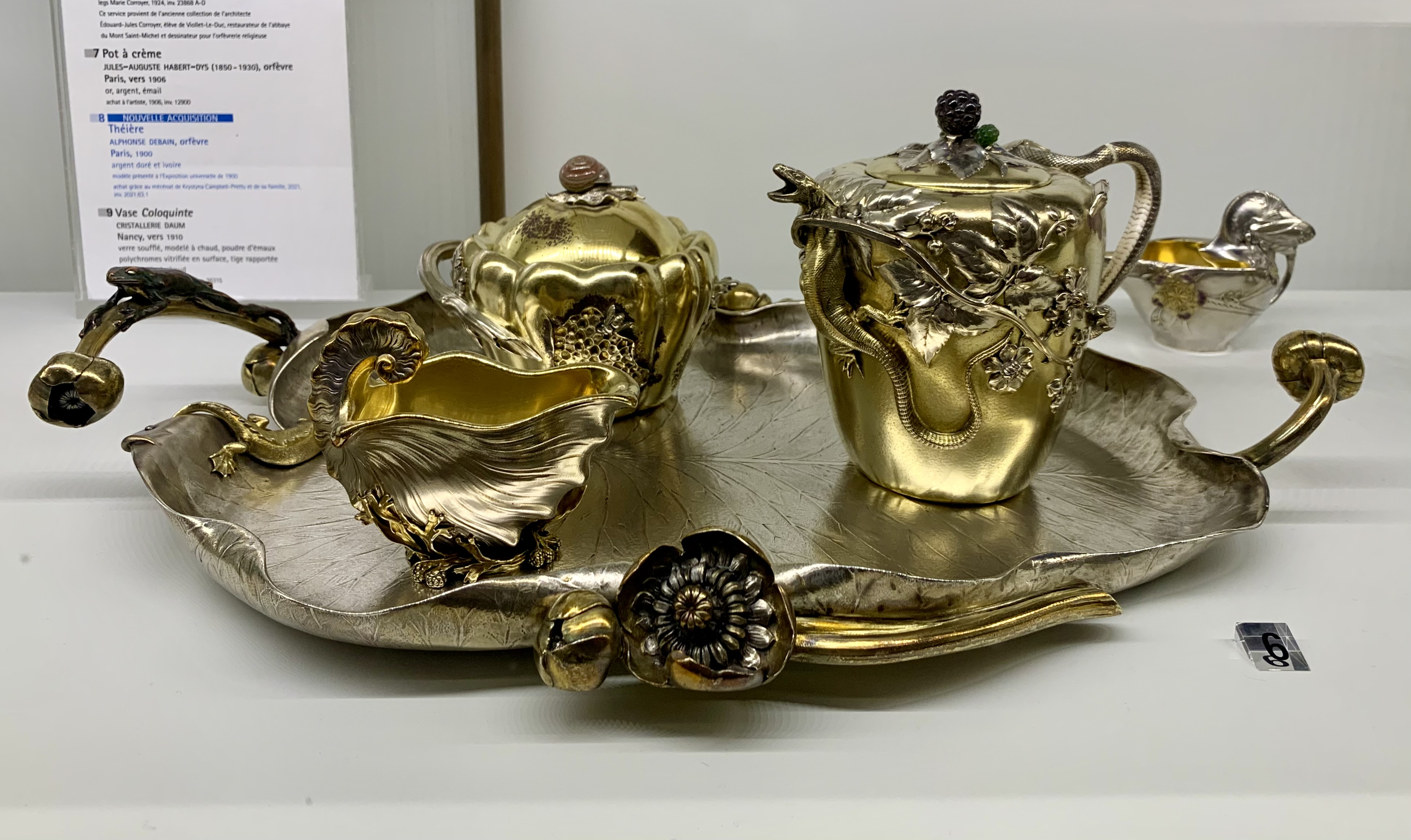
Tea set by Bapst & Falize, Germain Bapst, and Lucien Falize, made of partially gilt silver, ivory and agate (c. 1889)

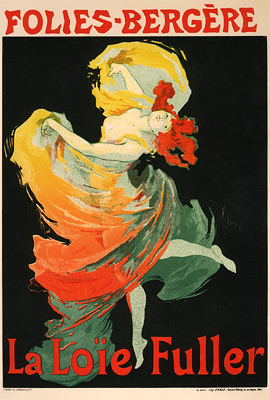
Poster for the dancer Loie Fuller by Jules Chéret (1893)

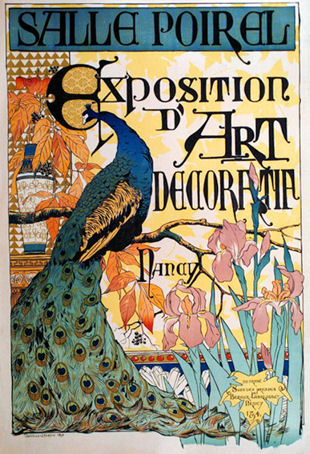
Poster by Camille Martin for L'Exposition d'art décoratif at the Galeries Poirel in Nancy (1894)

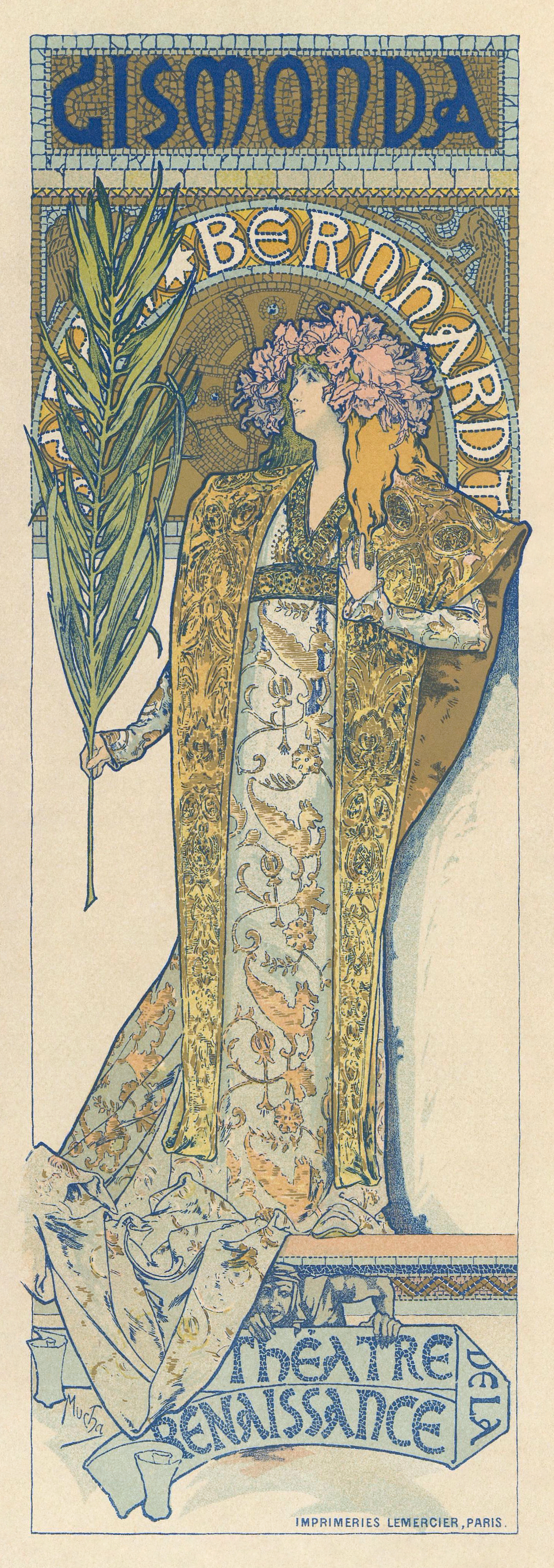
Poster by Alphonse Mucha for Gismonda starring Sarah Bernhardt (1894)

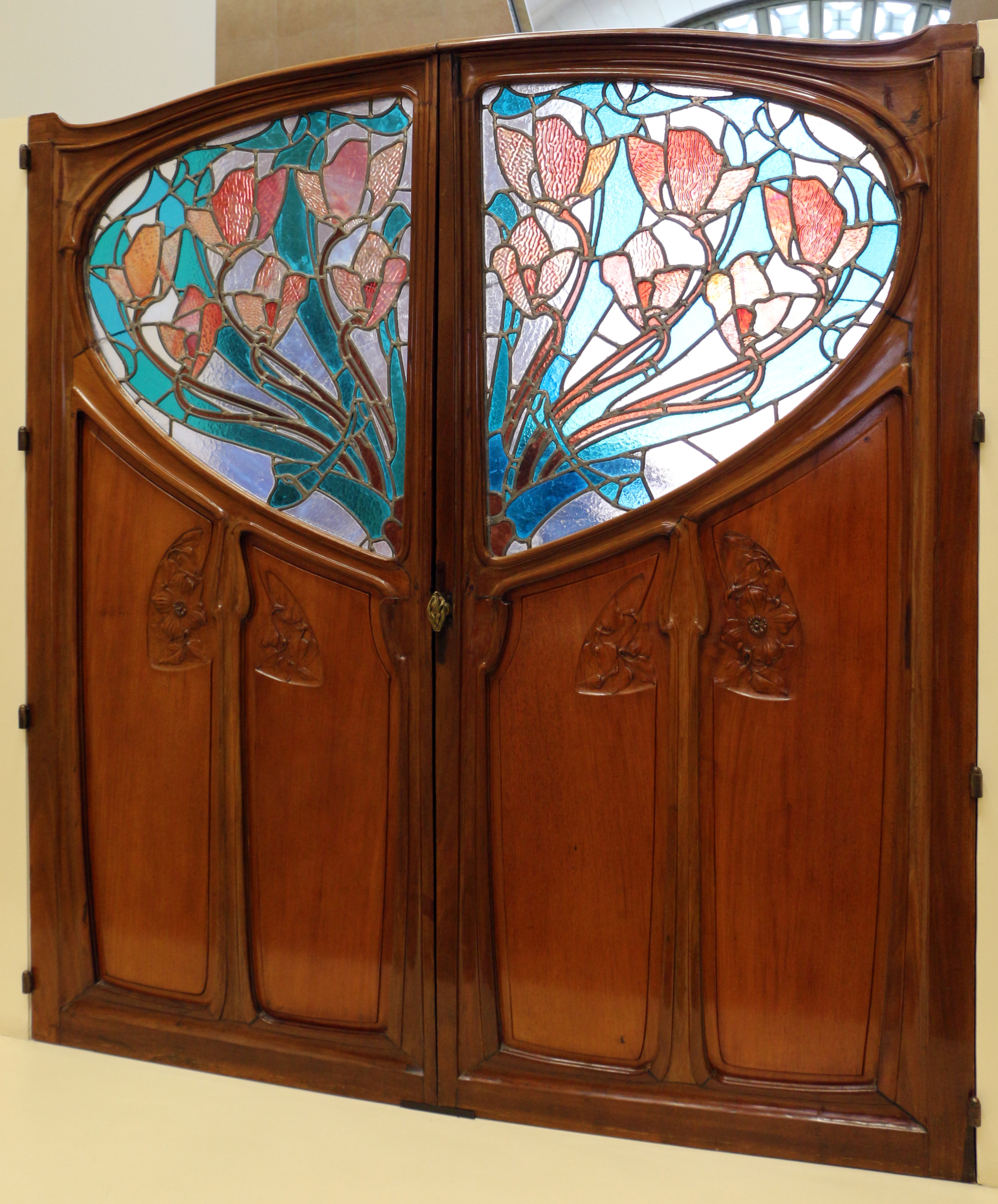
Doors with stained glass for the Store of Francois Vaexlaire in Nancy (1901), glass by Jacques Grüber, doors by Émile Andrè and Eugéne Vallin

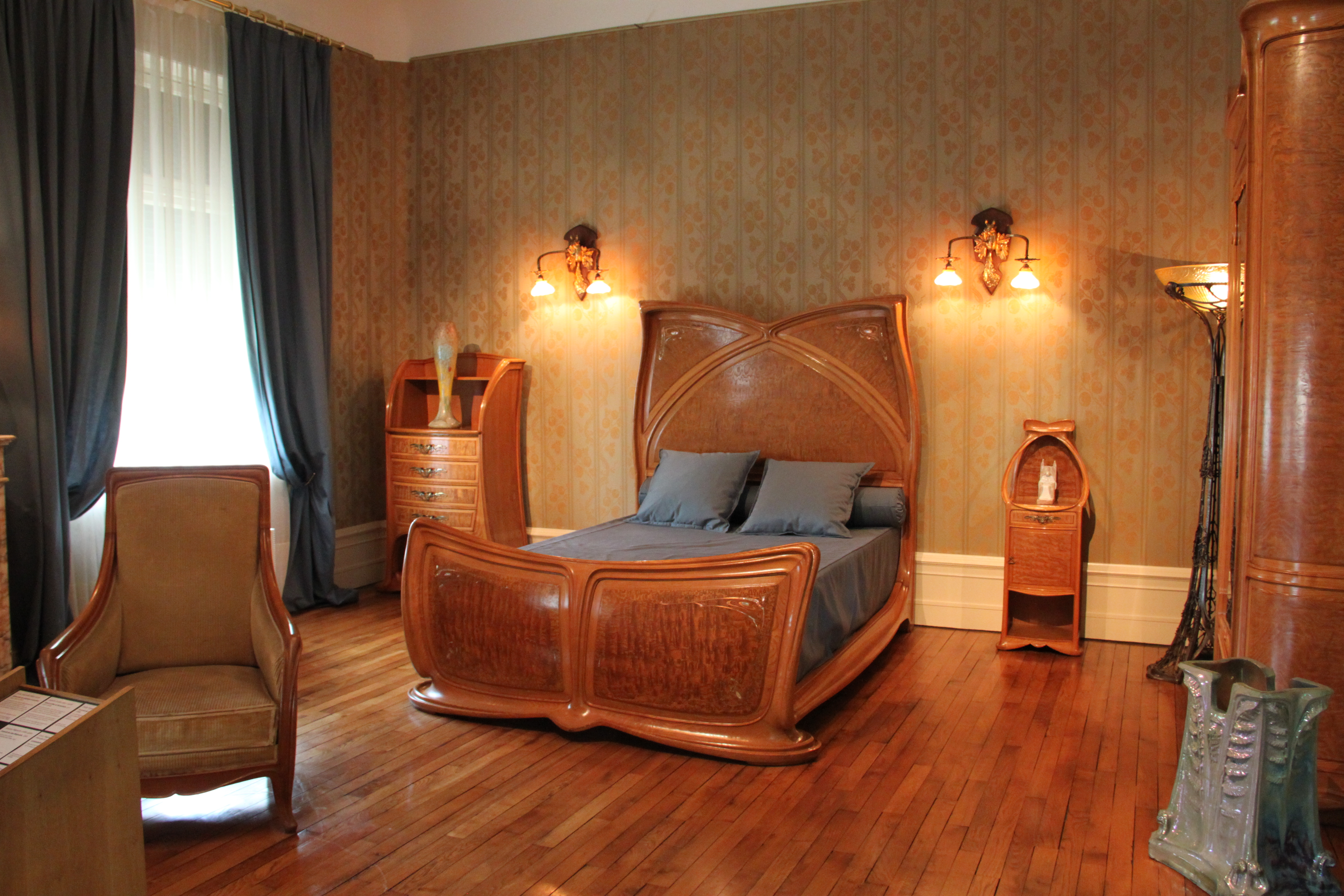
Bedroom furniture of the Villa Majorelle (1901–02), now in the Museum of Fine Arts of Nancy

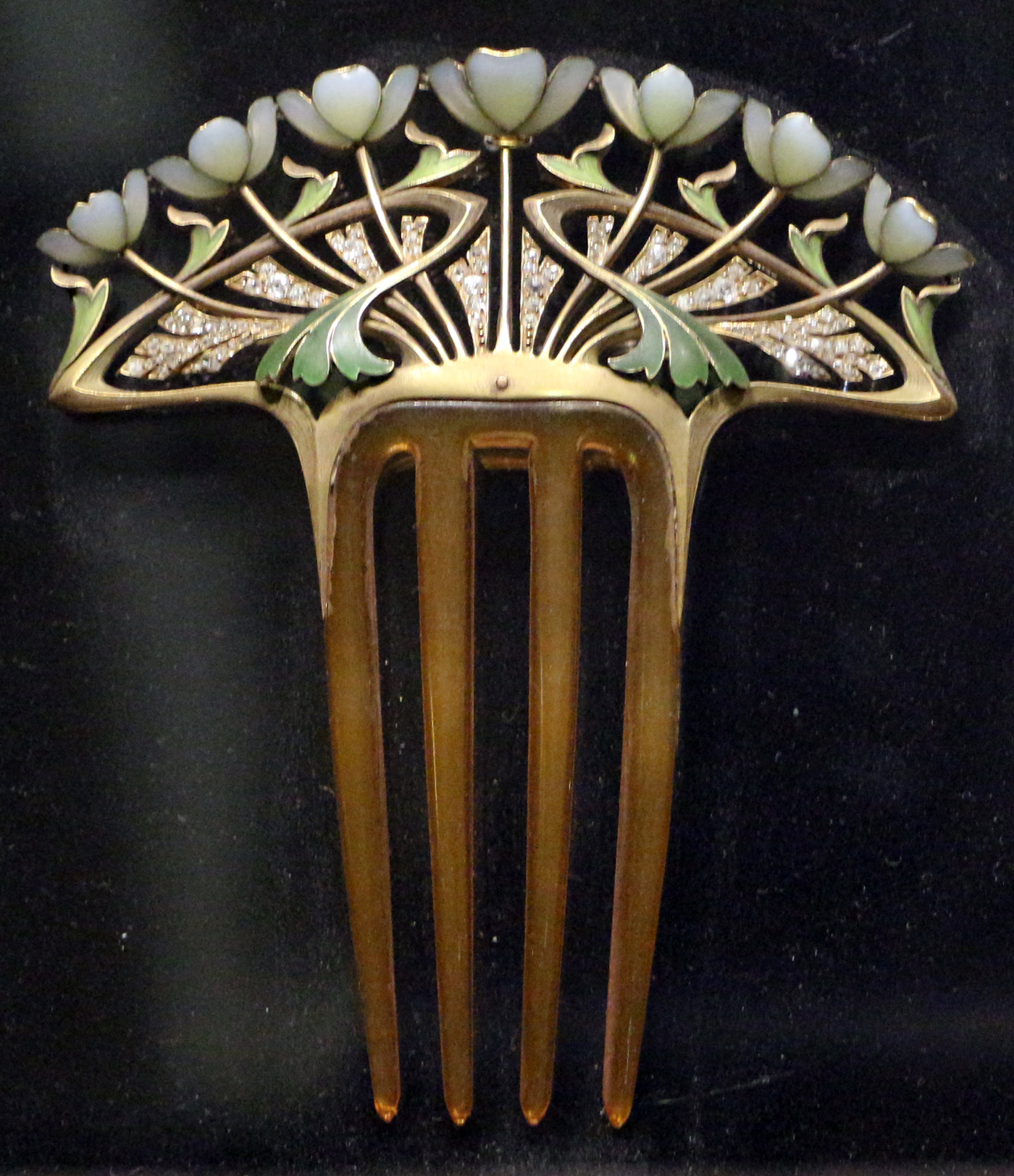
Comb of horn, gold, and diamonds by René Lalique (c. 1902), in the Musée d'Orsay, Paris

The French style was widely propagated by new magazines, including The Studio, Arts et Idées, and Art et Décoration, whose photographs and colour lithographs made the style known to designers and wealthy clients around the world.

In France, the style reached its summit in 1900, and thereafter slipped rapidly out of fashion, virtually disappearing from France by 1905. Art Nouveau was a luxury style, which required expert and highly-paid craftsmen, and could not be easily or cheaply mass-produced. One of the few Art Nouveau products that could be mass-produced was the perfume bottle, and these are still manufactured in the style today.

=== Art Nouveau in Belgium ===
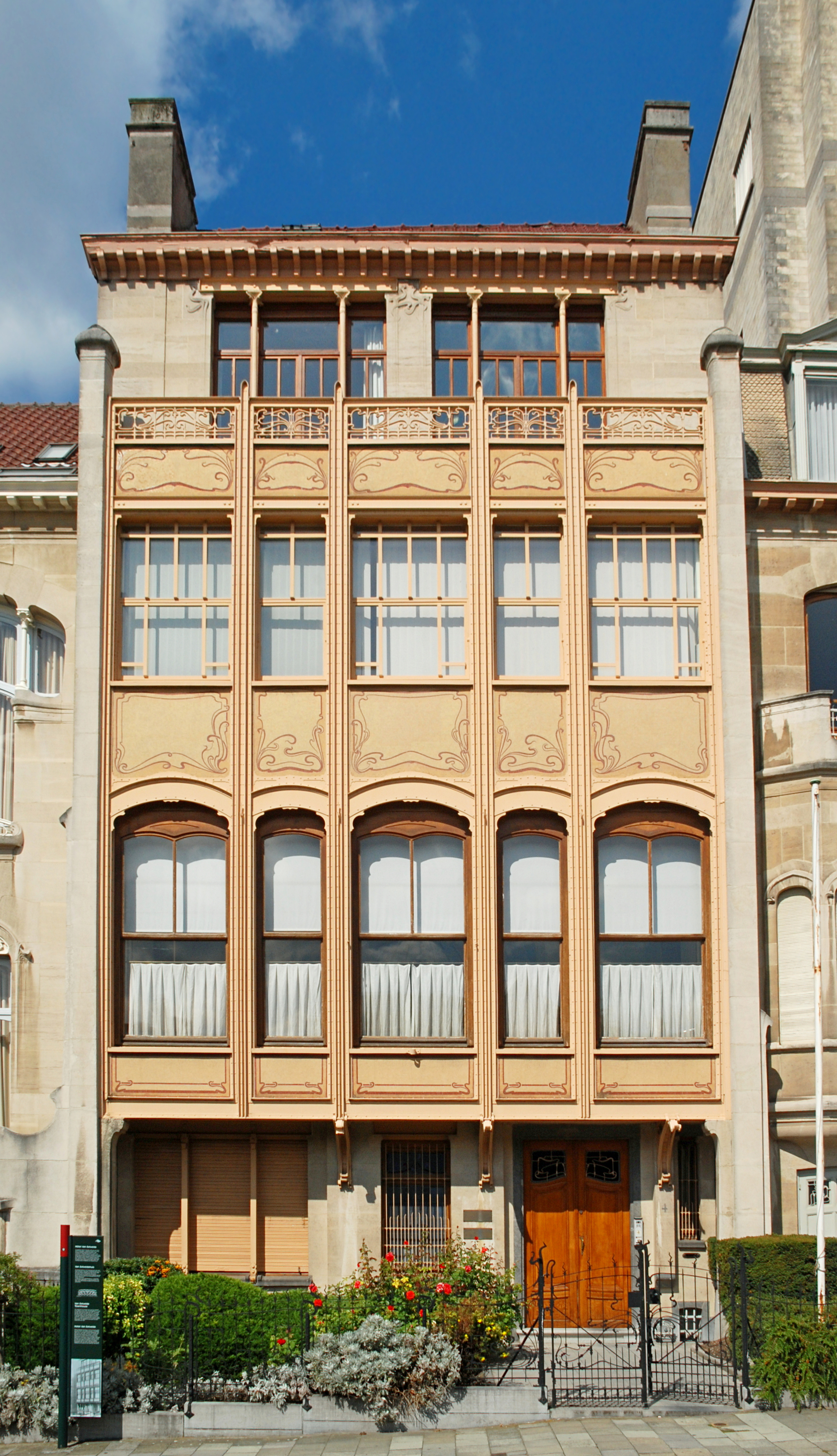
Hôtel van Eetvelde in Brussels by Victor Horta (1895–1901)

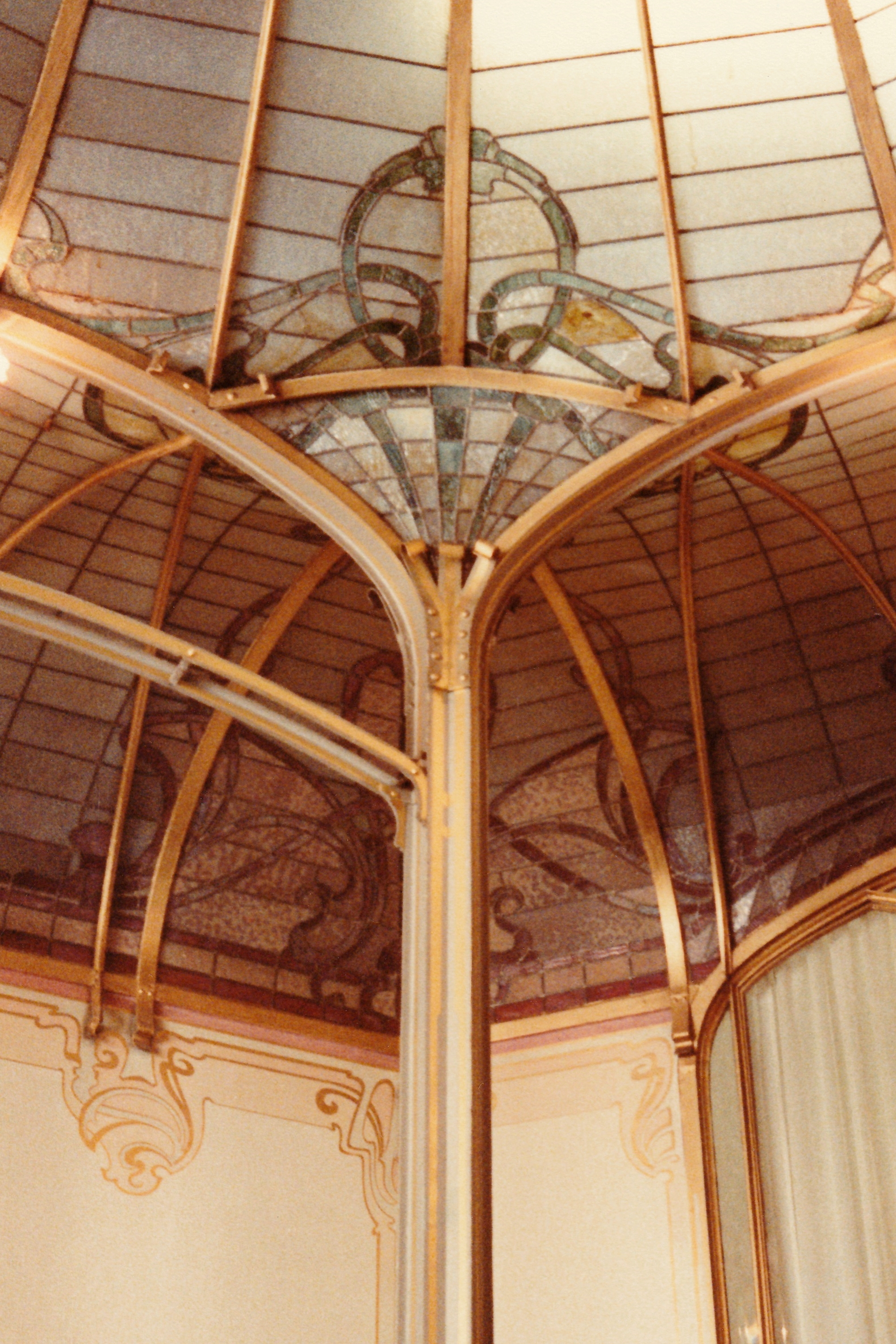
Detail of the Winter Garden of the Hôtel van Eetvelde

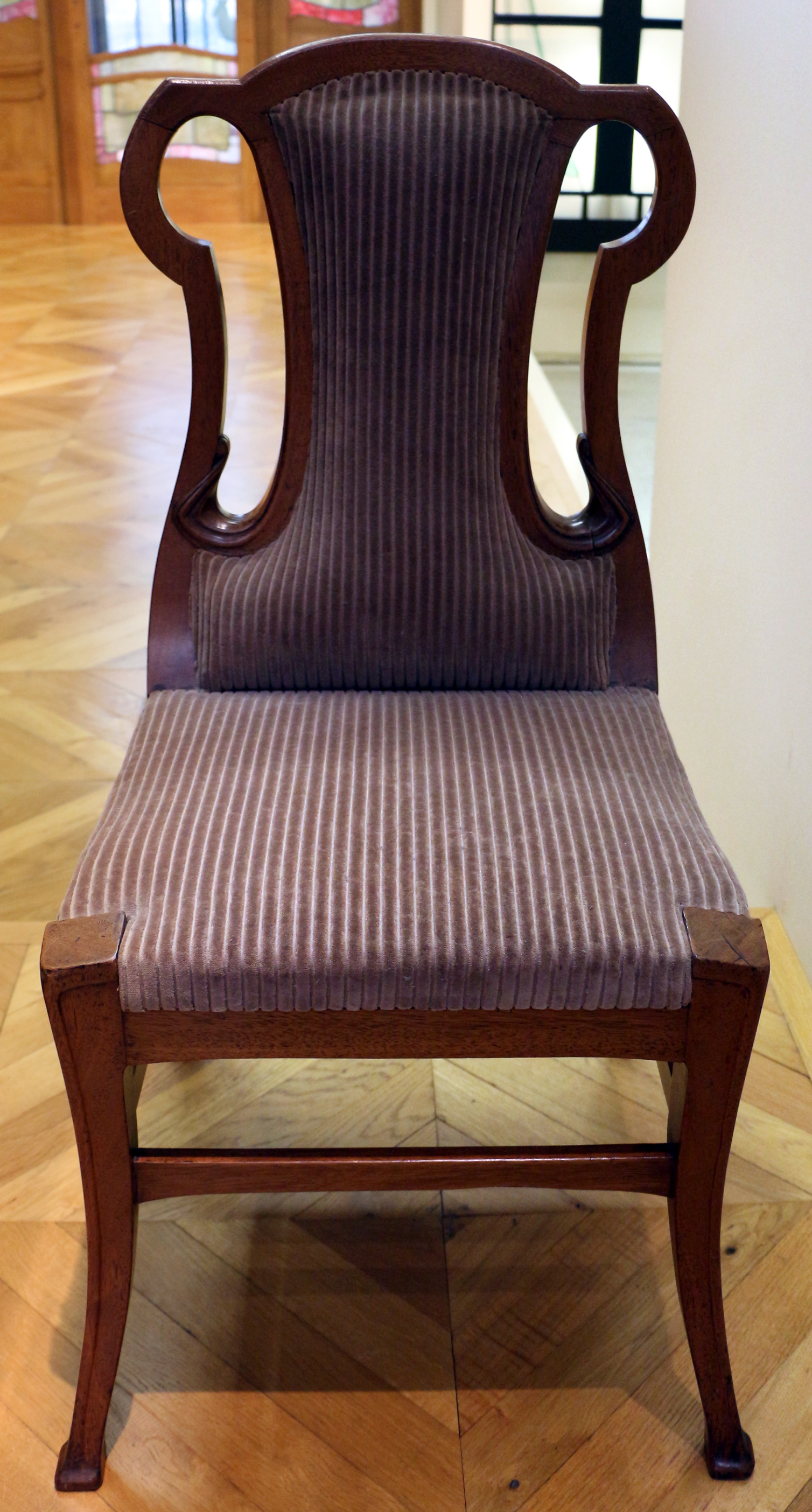
Chair by Henry van de Velde (1896)

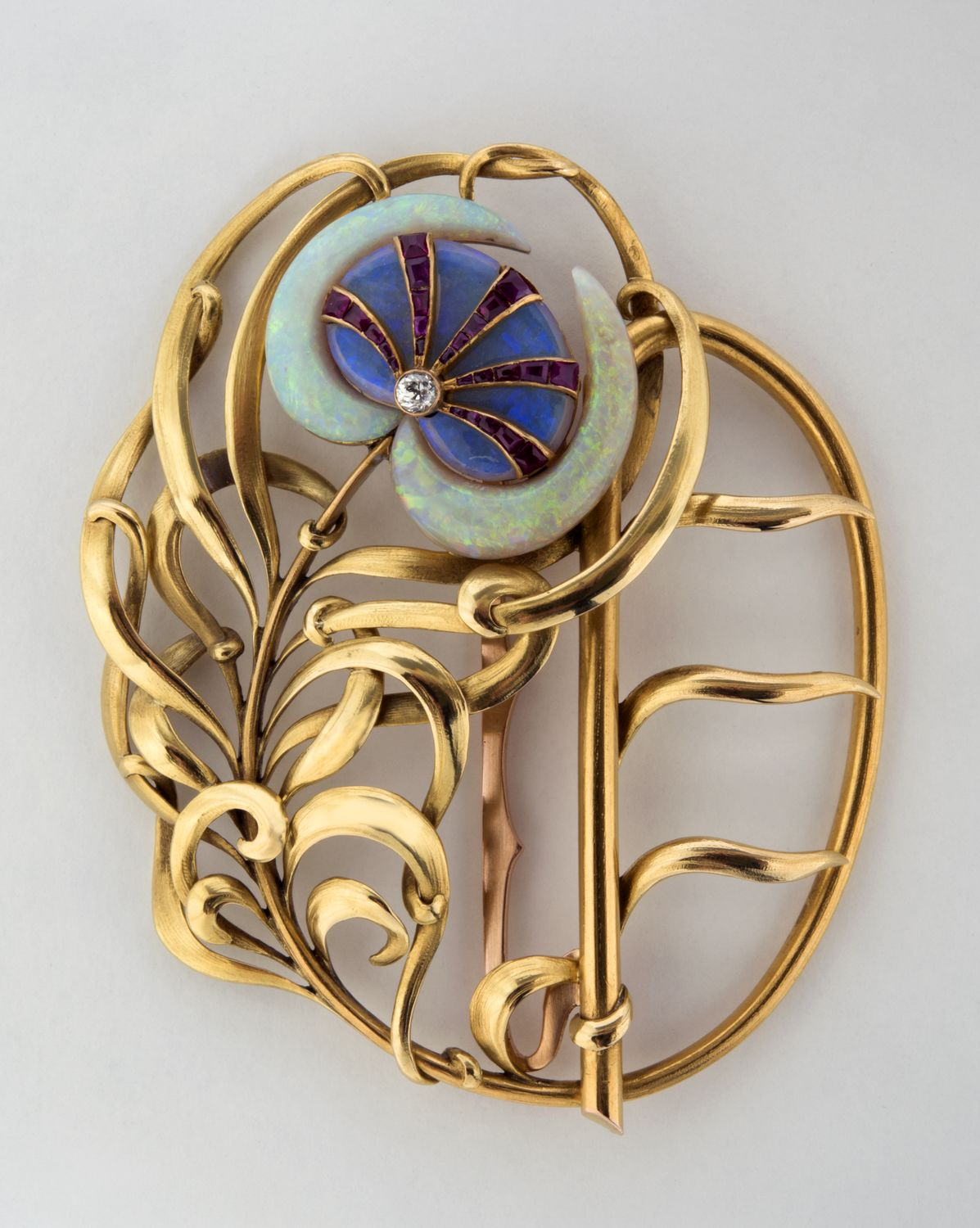
Philippe Wolfers, Plumes de Paon ('Peacock Feathers'), belt buckle (1898)

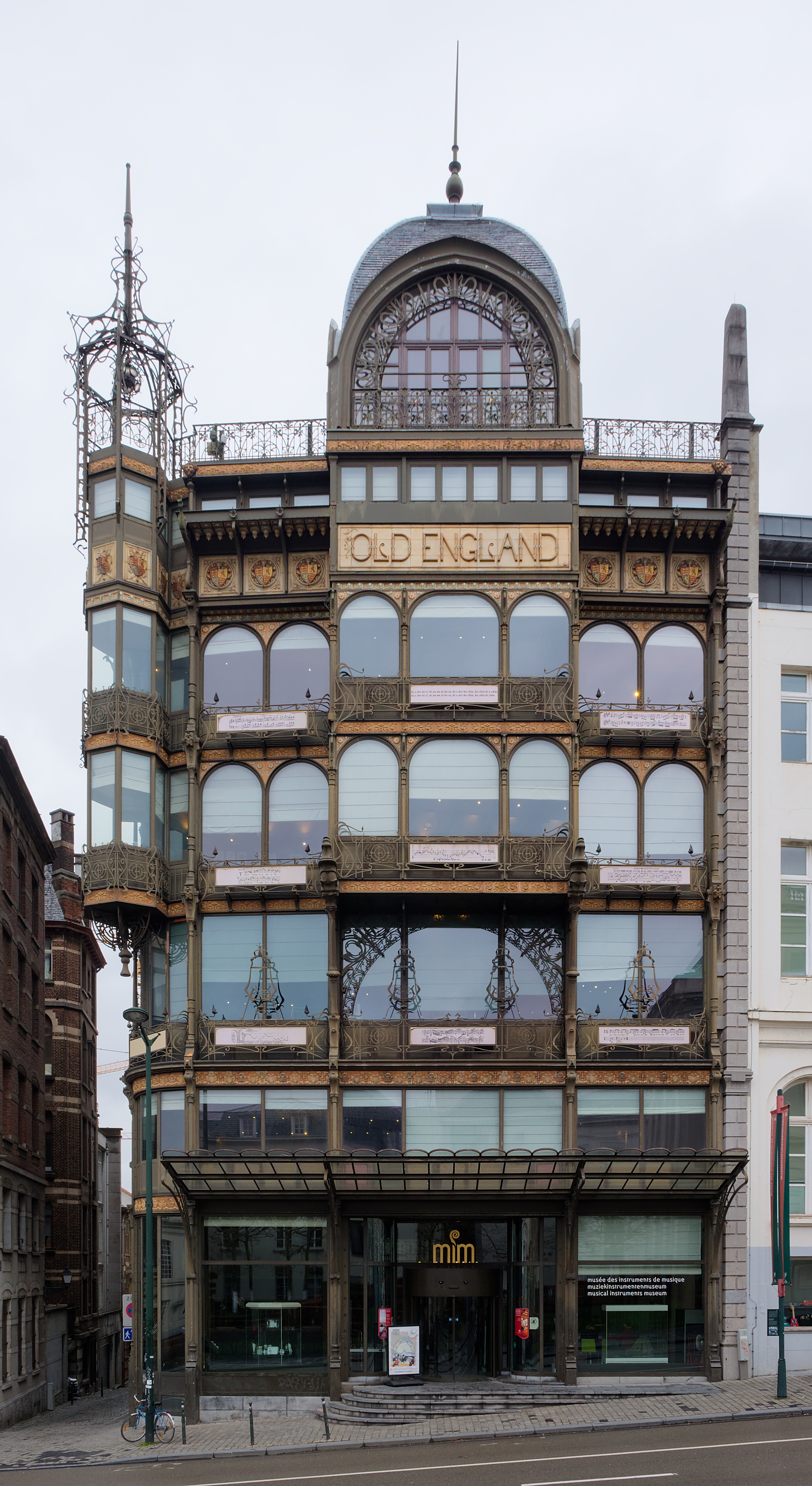
Former Old England department store in Brussels by Paul Saintenoy (1898–99)

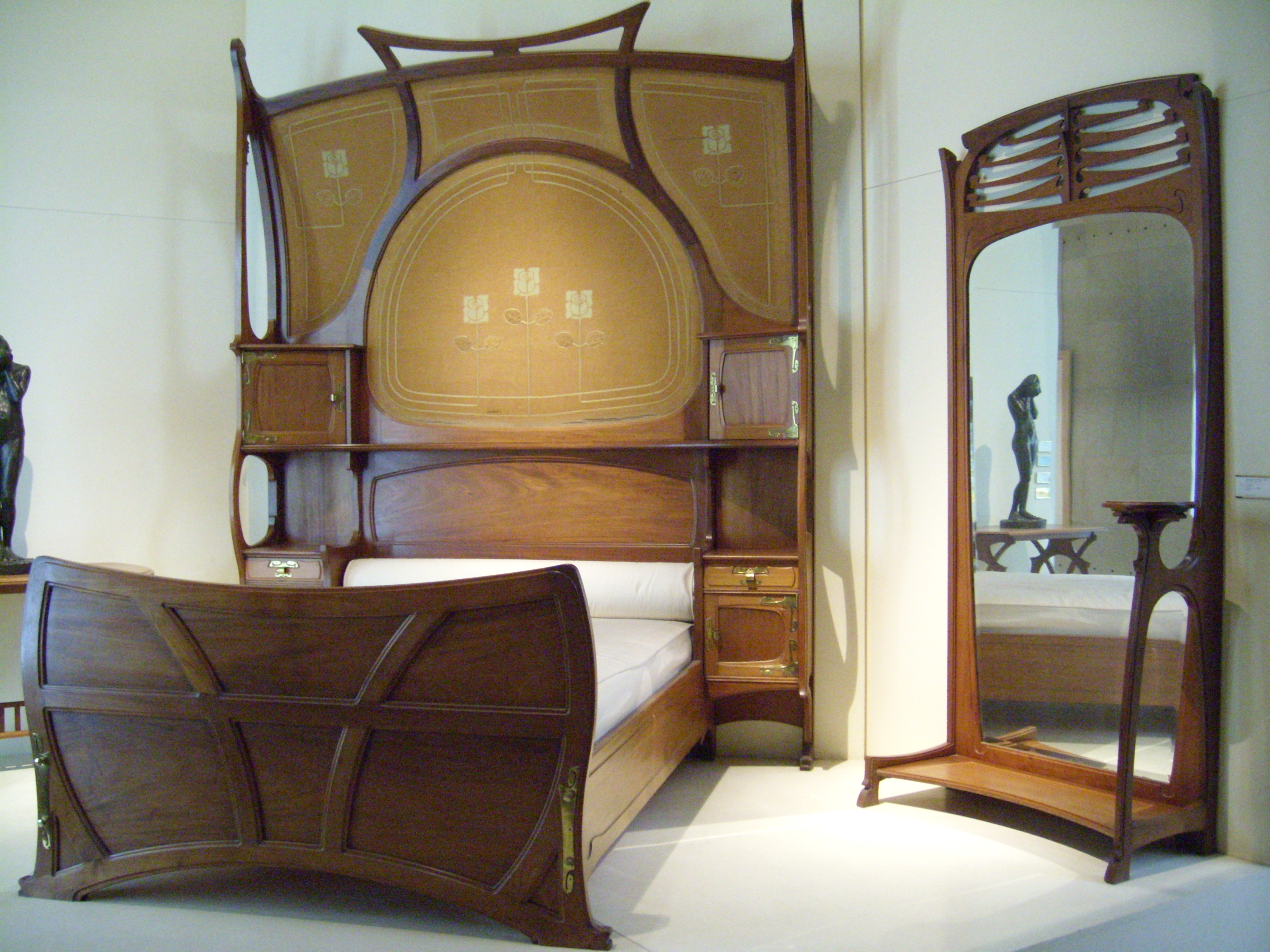
Bed and mirror by Gustave Serrurier-Bovy (1898–99), now in the Musée d'Orsay, Paris

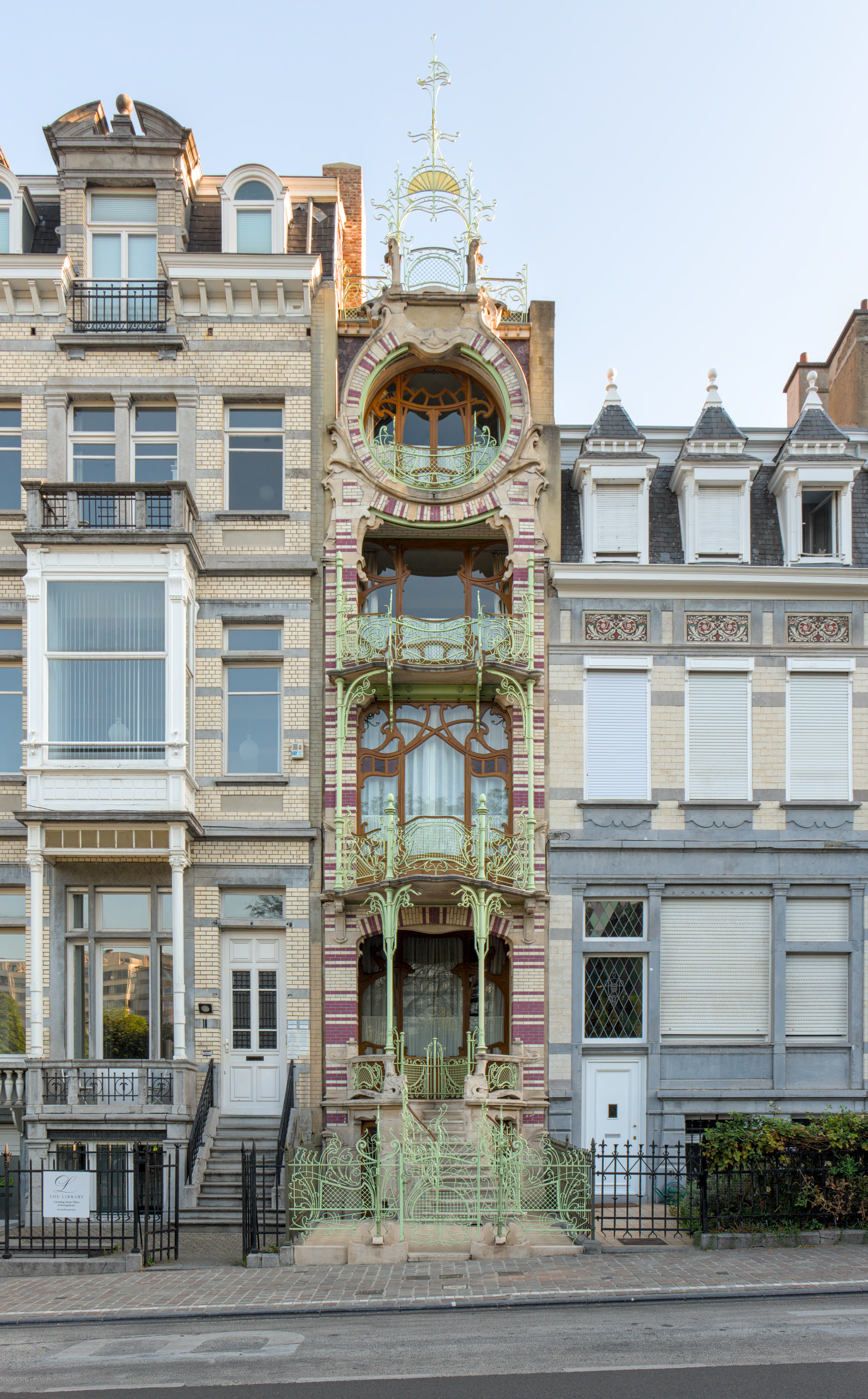
Saint-Cyr House in Brussels by Gustave Strauven (1901–1903)

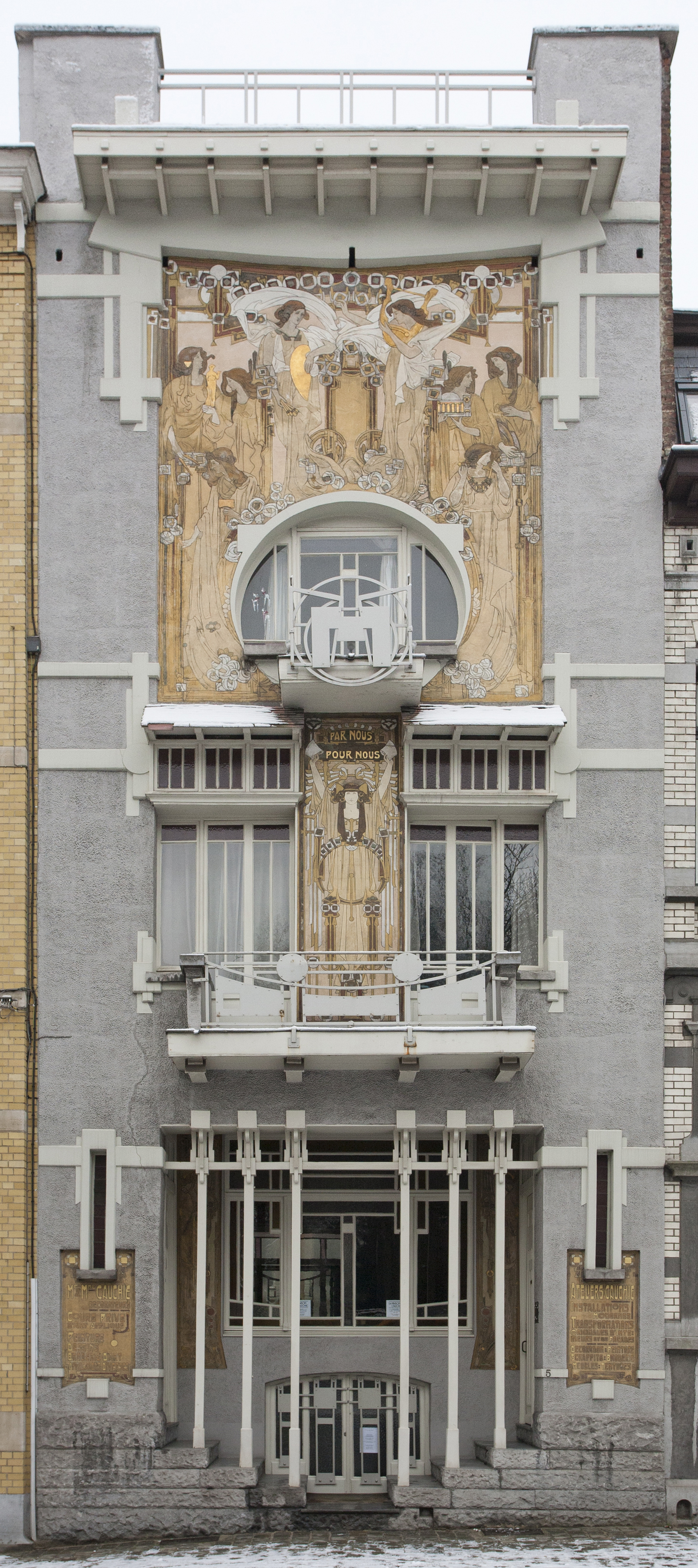
House of the architect Paul Cauchie in Brussels, featuring sgraffito (1905)

Belgium was an early centre of Art Nouveau, thanks largely to the architecture of Victor Horta, who designed one of the first Art Nouveau houses, the Hôtel Tassel in 1893, and three other townhouses in variations of the same style. They are now UNESCO World Heritage sites. Horta had a strong influence on the work of the young Hector Guimard, who came to see the Hôtel Tassel under construction, and later declared that Horta was the "inventor" of the Art Nouveau. Horta's innovation was not the façade, but the interior, using an abundance of iron and glass to open up space and flood the rooms with light, and decorating them with wrought iron columns and railings in curving vegetal forms, which were echoed on the floors and walls, as well as the furniture and carpets which Horta designed.

Paul Hankar was another pioneer of Brussels' Art Nouveau. His house was completed in 1893, the same year as Horta's Hôtel Tassel, and featured sgraffiti murals on the façade. Hankar was influenced by both Viollet-le-Duc and the ideas of the English Arts and Crafts movement. His conception idea was to bring together decorative and fine arts in a coherent whole. He commissioned the sculptor Alfred Crick and the painter Adolphe Crespin to decorate the façades of houses with their work. The most striking example was the house and studio built for the artist Albert Ciamberlani at 48, rue Defacqz/Defacqzstraat in Brussels, for which he created an exuberant façade covered with sgraffito murals with painted figures and ornament, recreating the decorative architecture of the Quattrocento, or 15th-century Italy. Hankar died in 1901, when his work was just receiving recognition.

Gustave Strauven began his career as an assistant designer working with Horta, before he started his own practice at age 21, making some of the most extravagant Art Nouveau buildings in Brussels. His most famous work is the Saint-Cyr House at 11, square Ambiorix/Ambiorixsquare. The house is only 4 metres (13 ft) wide, but is given extraordinary height by his elaborate architectural inventions. It is entirely covered by polychrome bricks and a network of curling vegetal forms in wrought iron, in a virtually Art Nouveau-Baroque style.

Other important Art Nouveau artists from Belgium included the architect and designer Henry van de Velde, though the most important part of his career was spent in Germany; he strongly influenced the decoration of the Jugendstil. Others included the decorator Gustave Serrurier-Bovy, and the graphic artist Fernand Khnopff. Belgian designers took advantage of an abundant supply of ivory imported from the Belgian Congo; mixed sculptures, combining stone, metal and ivory, by such artists as Philippe Wolfers, was popular.

=== Nieuwe Kunst in the Netherlands ===
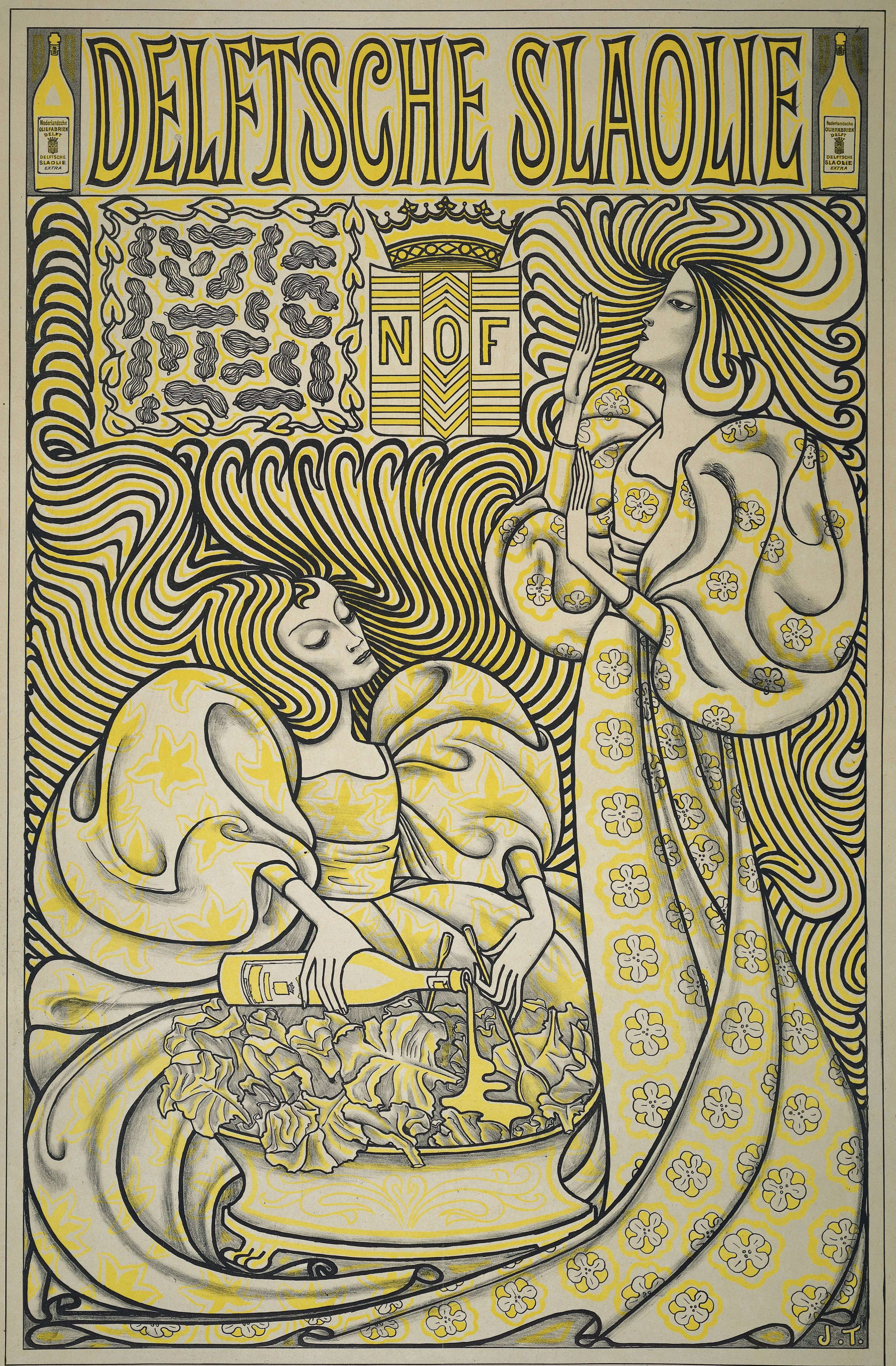
Poster for Delft Salad Oil by Jan Toorop (1893)

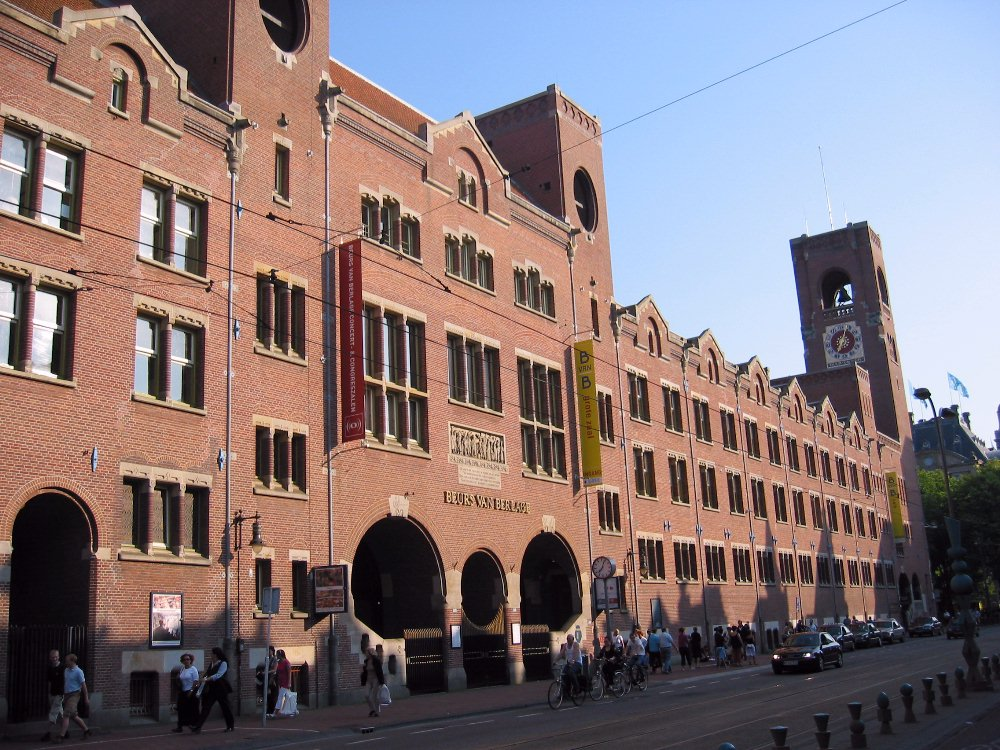
Amsterdam Commodities Exchange by Hendrik Petrus Berlage (1896–1903)

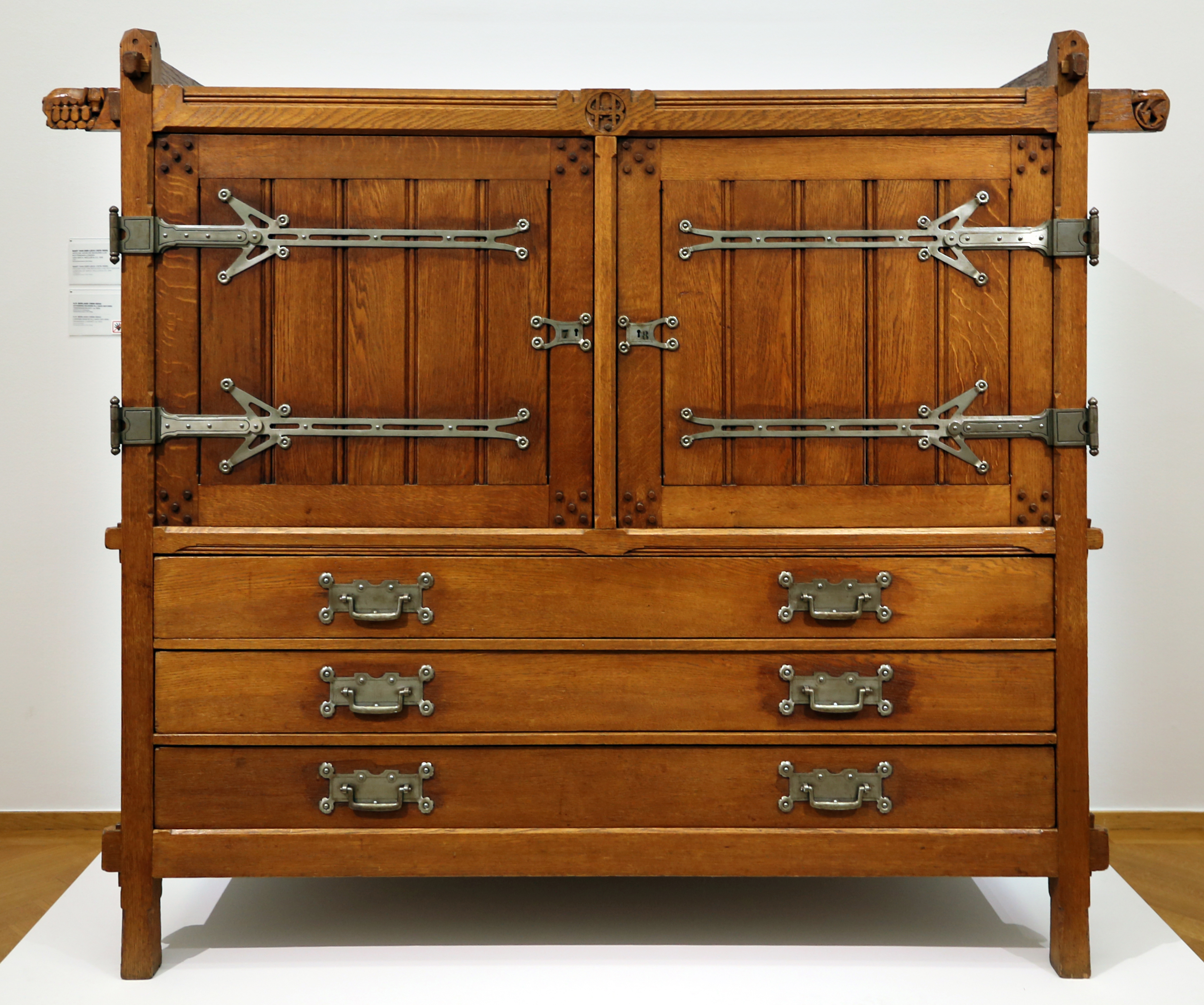
Cabinet/Desk by Berlage (1898)

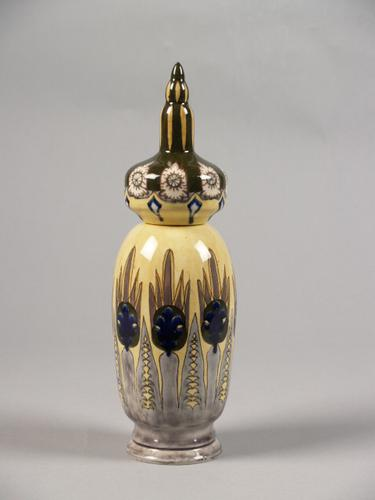
Vase with abstract floral design by Theo Colenbrander (1898)

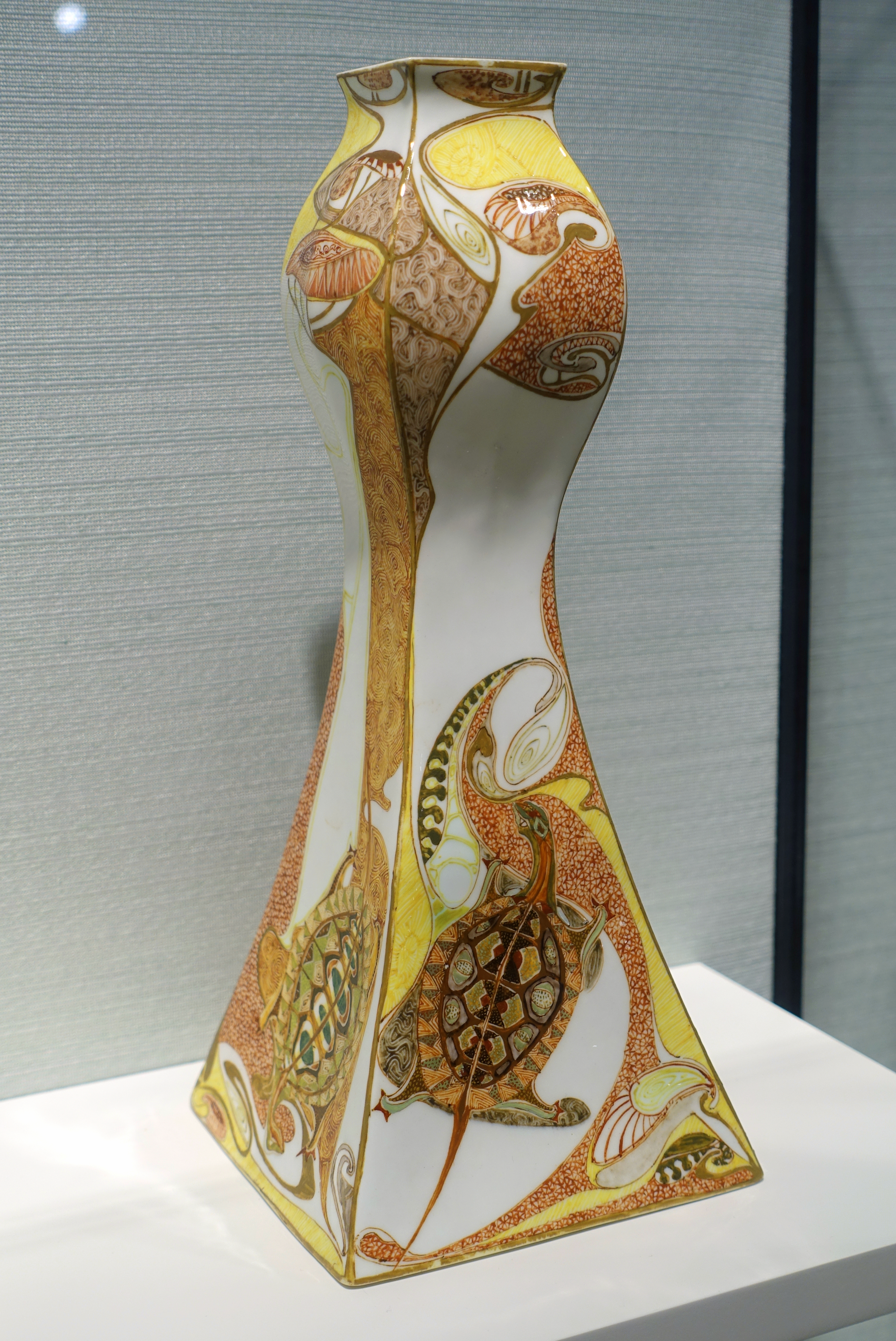
Porcelain vase designed by J. Jurriaan Kok and decorated by W.R. Sterken (1901)

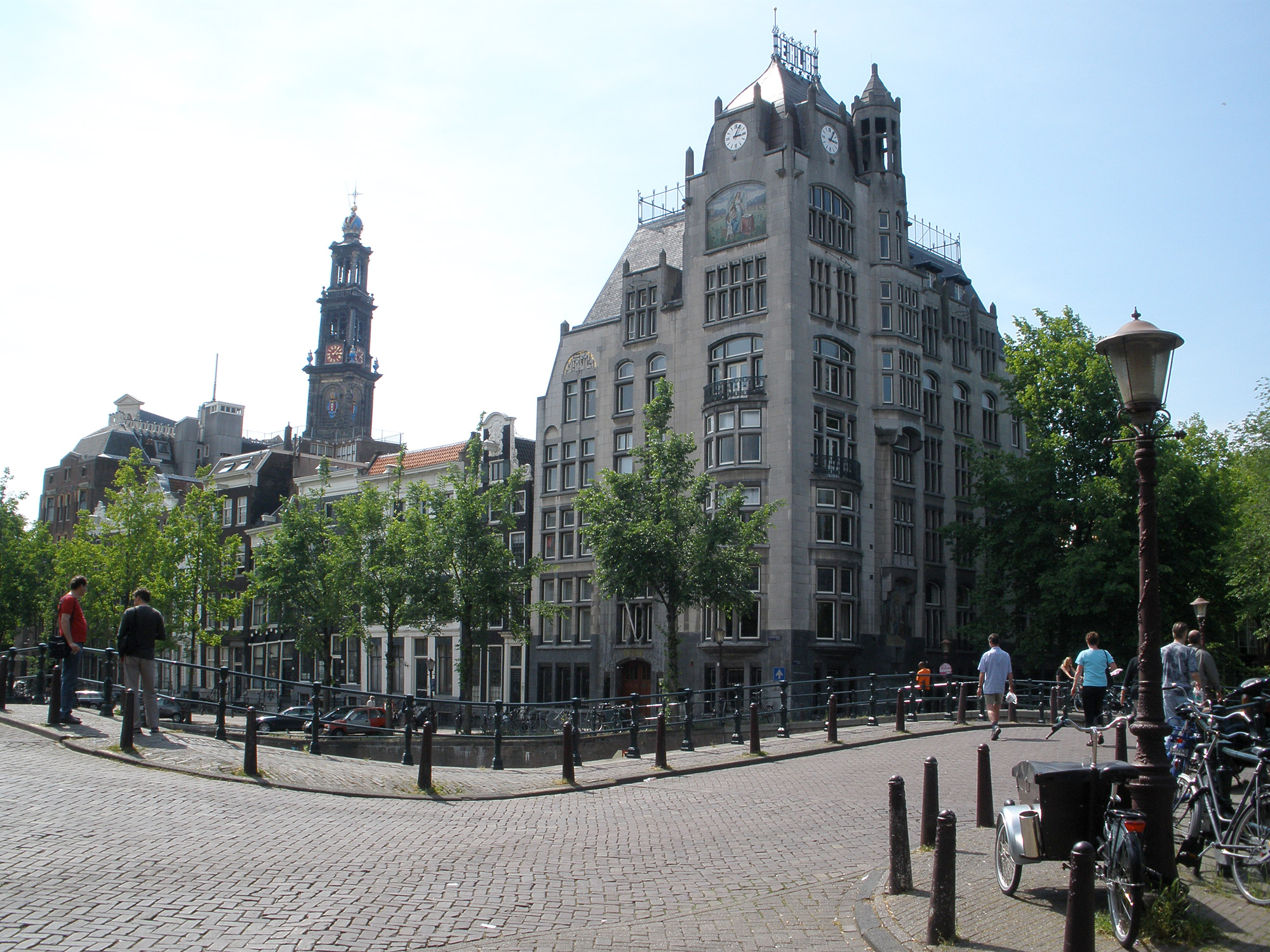
Astoria building in Amsterdam by Herman Hendrik Baanders and Gerrit van Arkel (1905)

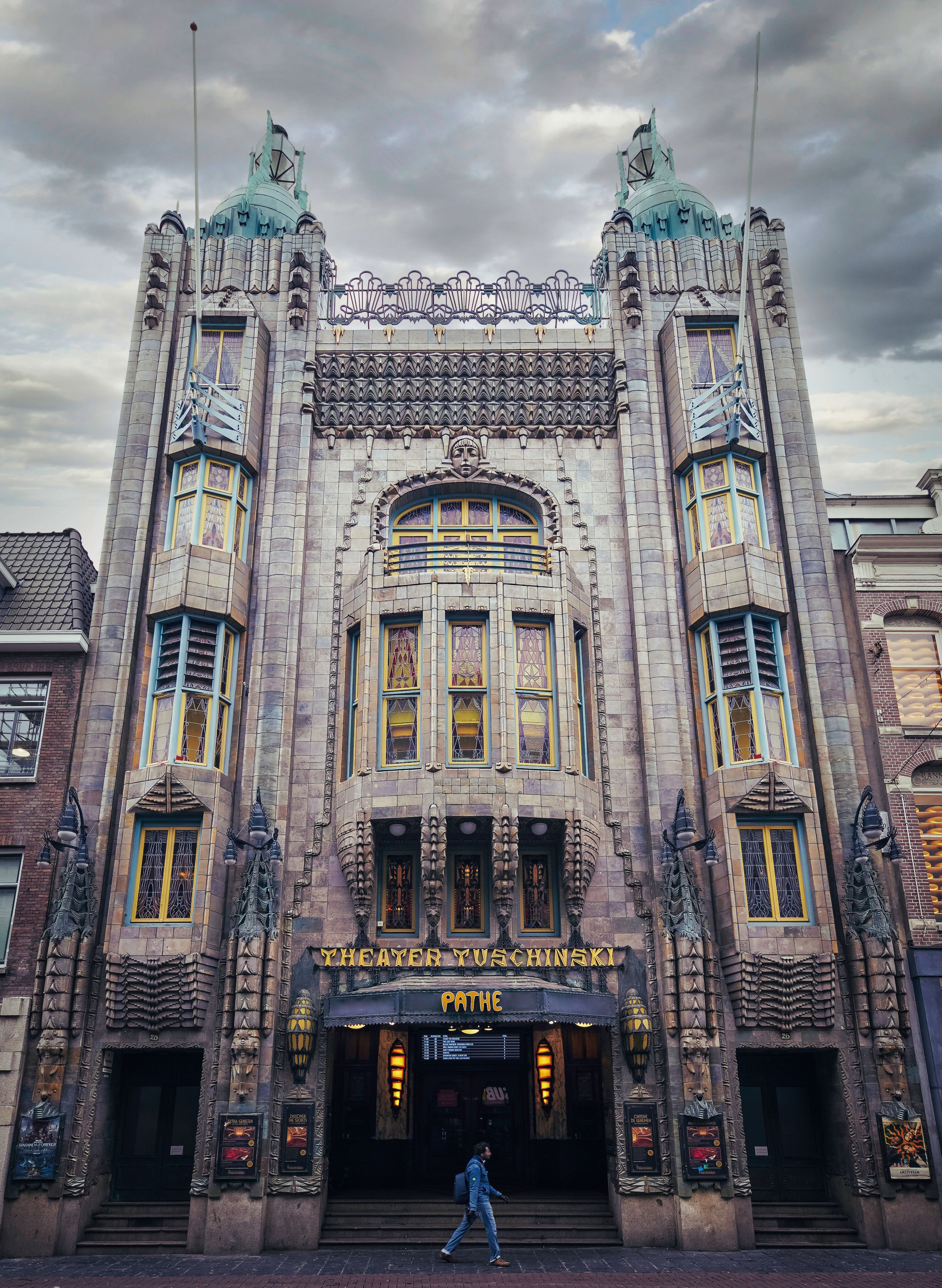
Tuschinski Theatre in Amsterdam by Hijman Louis de Jong and Willem Kromhout (1921)

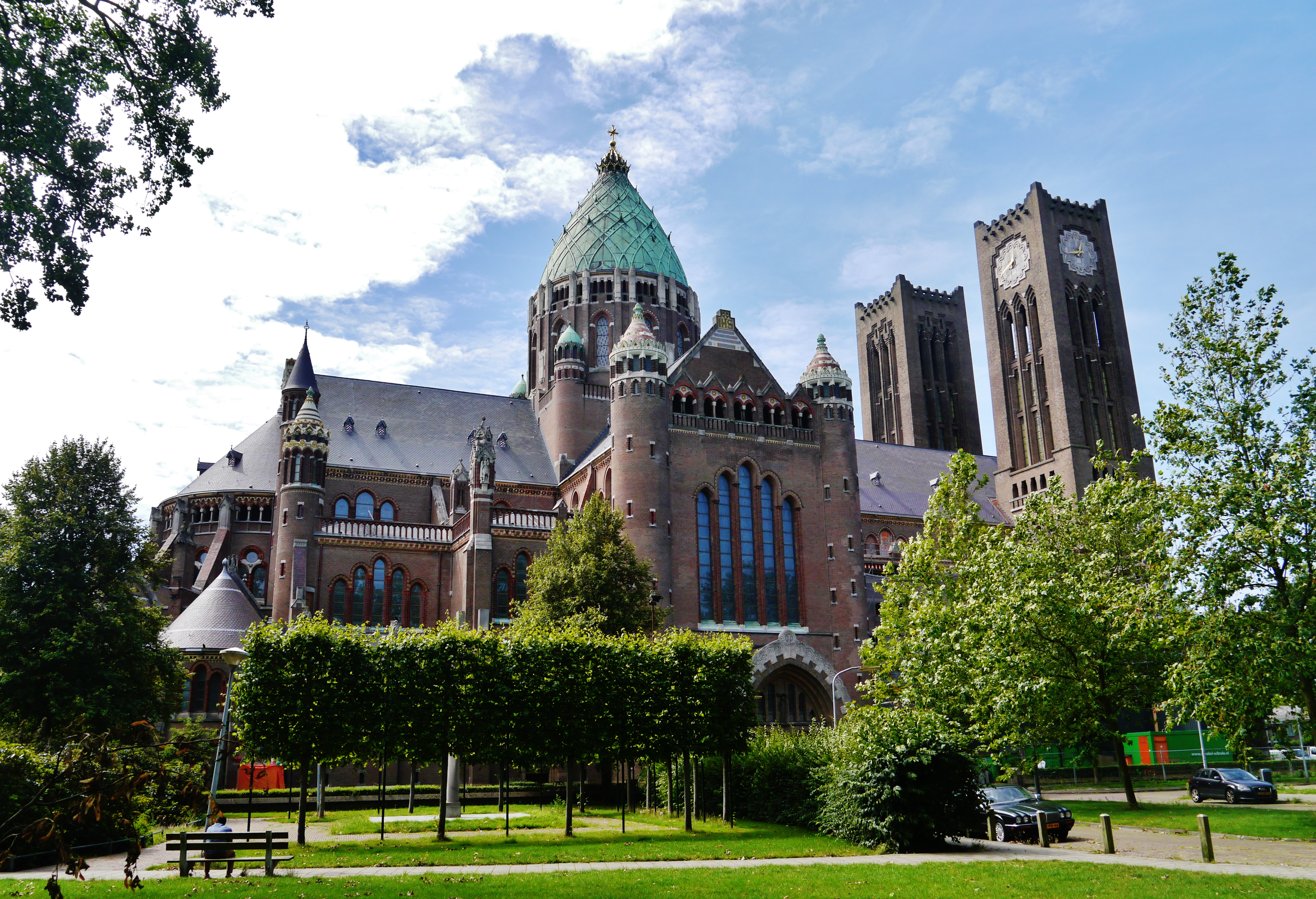
Cathedral of St Bavo in Haarlem by Joseph Cuypers (1930)

In the Netherlands, the style was known as the Nieuwe Stijl ('New Style'), or Nieuwe Kunst ('New Art'), and it took a different direction from the more floral and curving style in Belgium. It was influenced by the more geometric and stylised forms of the German Jugendstil and Austrian Vienna Secession. It was also influenced by the art and imported woods from the Dutch East Indies (now Indonesia), particularly the designs of the textiles and batik from Java.

The most important architect and furniture designer in the style was Hendrik Petrus Berlage, who denounced historical styles and advocated a purely functional architecture. He wrote, "It is necessary to fight against the art of illusion, to recognise the lie, in order to find the essence and not the illusion." Like Victor Horta and Gaudí, he was an admirer of architectural theories of Viollet-le-Duc. His furniture was designed to be strictly functional, and to respect the natural forms of wood, rather than bending or twisting it as if it were metal. He pointed to the example of Egyptian furniture, and preferred chairs with right angles. His first and most famous architectural work was the Beurs van Berlage (1896–1903), the Amsterdam Commodities Exchange, which he built following the principles of constructivism. Everything was functional, including the lines of rivets that decorated the walls of the main room. He often included very tall towers to his buildings to make them more prominent, a practice used by other Art Nouveau architects of the period, including Joseph Maria Olbrich in Vienna and Eliel Saarinen in Finland.

Other buildings in the style include the American Hotel (1898–1900), by W. Kromhout and H. G. Jansen; and Astoria (1904–1905) by Herman Hendrik Baanders and Gerrit van Arkel in Amsterdam; the railway station in Haarlem (1906–1908), and the former office building of the Holland America Lines (1917) in Rotterdam, now the Hotel New York.

Prominent graphic artists and illustrators in the style included the Jan Toorop, whose work inclined toward mysticism and symbolism, even in his posters for salad oil. In their colours and designs, they also sometimes showed the influence of the art of his birthplace, Java.

Important figures in Dutch ceramics and porcelain included Jurriaan Kok and Theo Colenbrander. They used colorful floral pattern and more traditional Art Nouveau motifs, combined with unusual forms of pottery and contrasting dark and light colours, borrowed from the batik decoration of Java.

=== Modern Style and Glasgow School in Britain ===
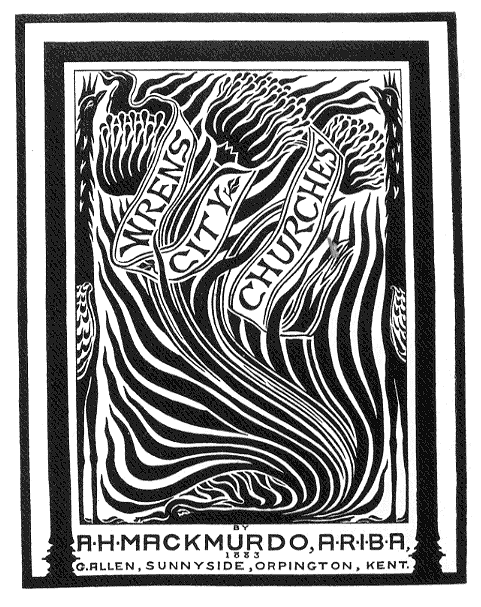
Cover design by Arthur Mackmurdo for a book on Christopher Wren (1883)

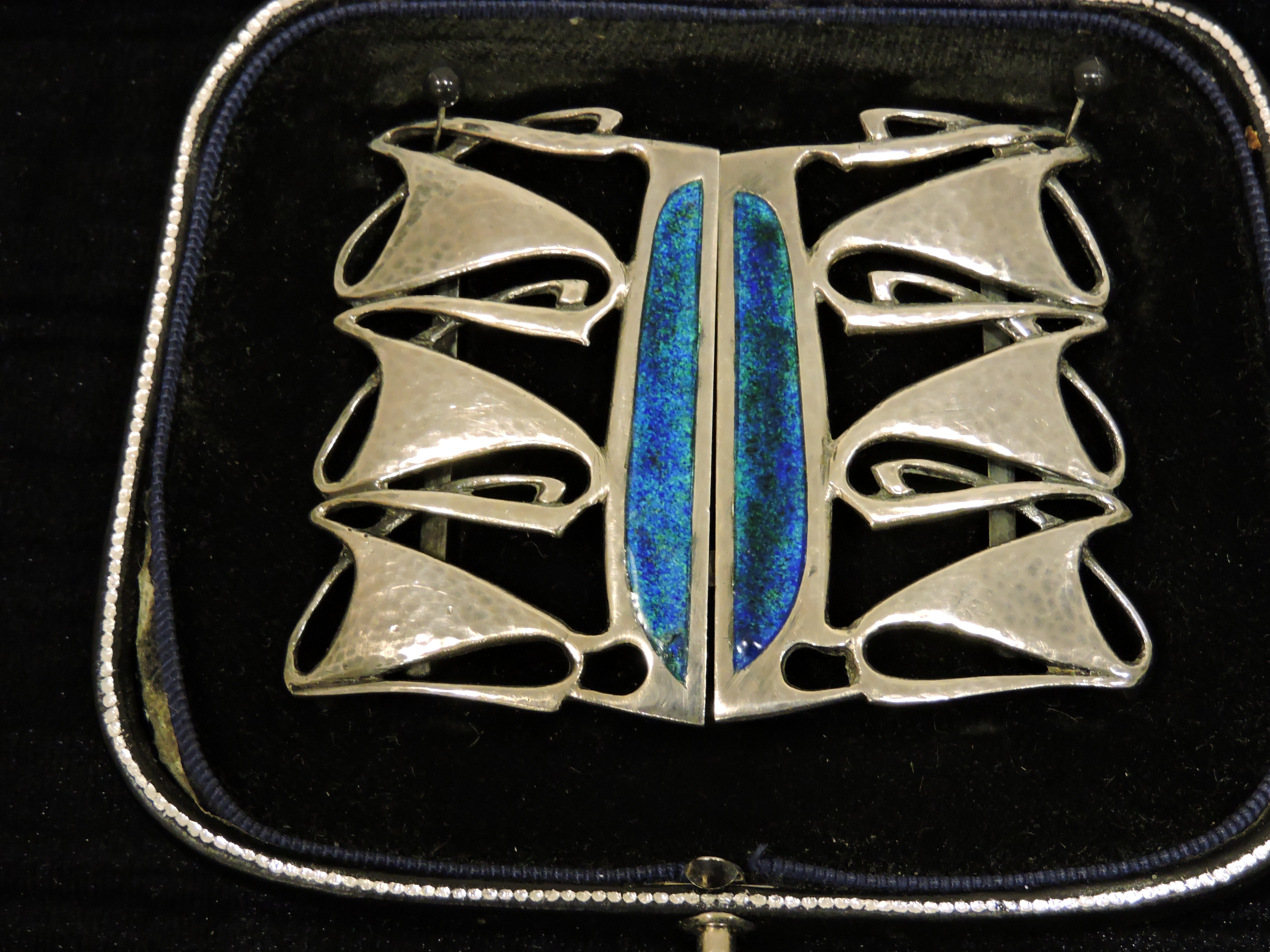
Belt buckle by Archibald Knox for Liberty department store (1899)

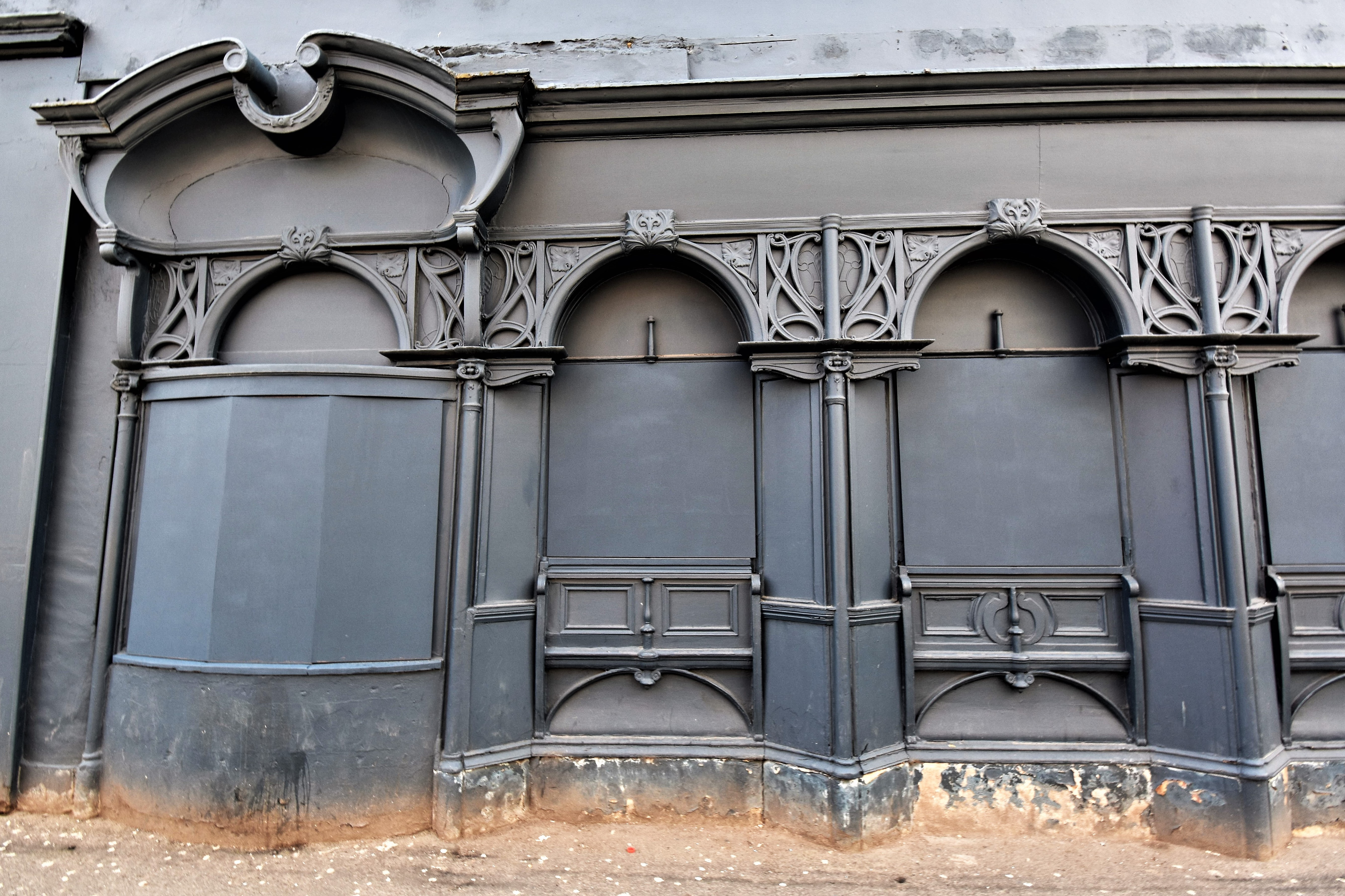
Pub building by James Hoey Craigie at 59 Dumbarton Road, Glasgow (1899–1900)

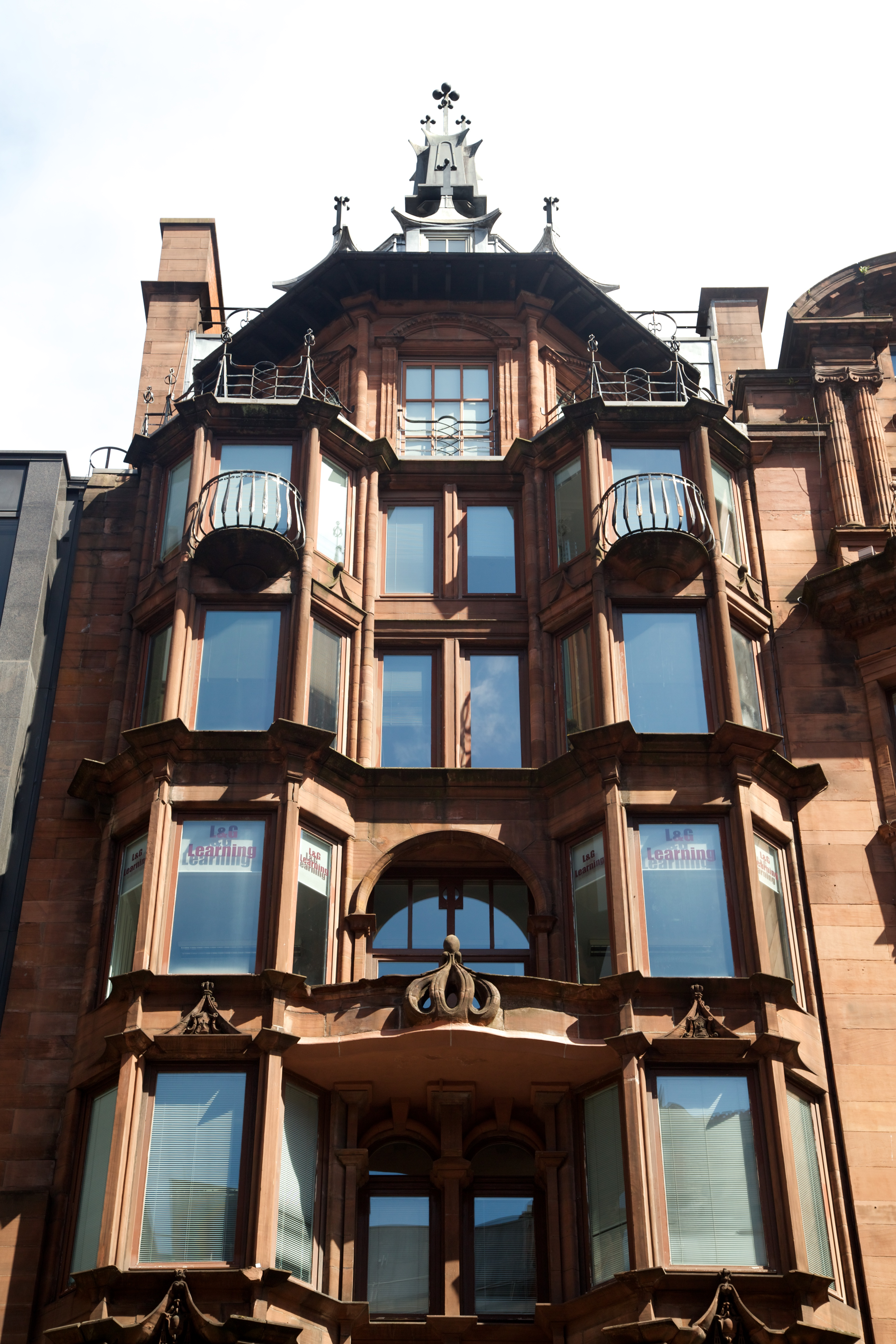
Hatrack building by James Salmon at 142a, 144 St. Vincent Street, Glasgow (1899–1902)

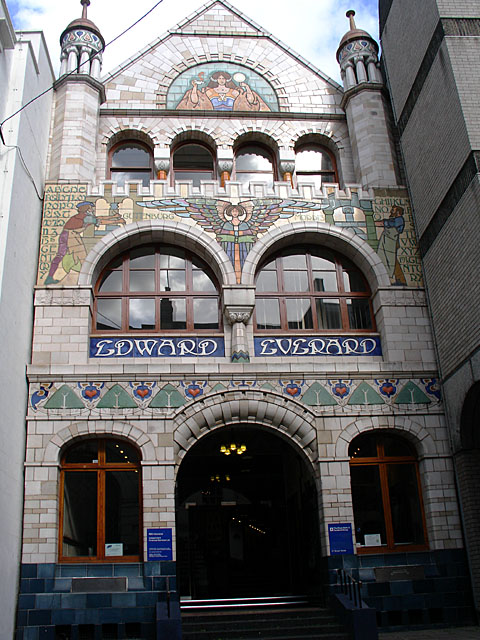
Former Everard's Printing Works by Henry Williams, Broad Street, Bristol (1900)

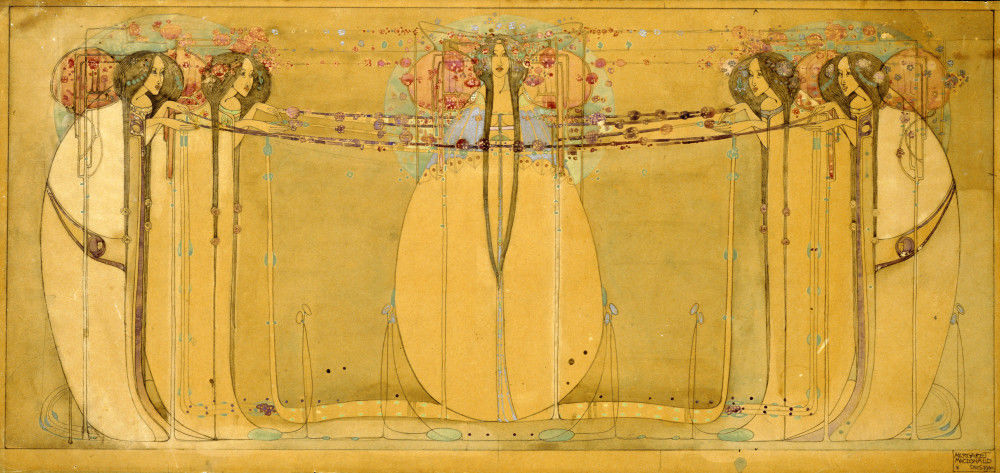
The May Queen by Margaret Macdonald Mackintosh (1900)

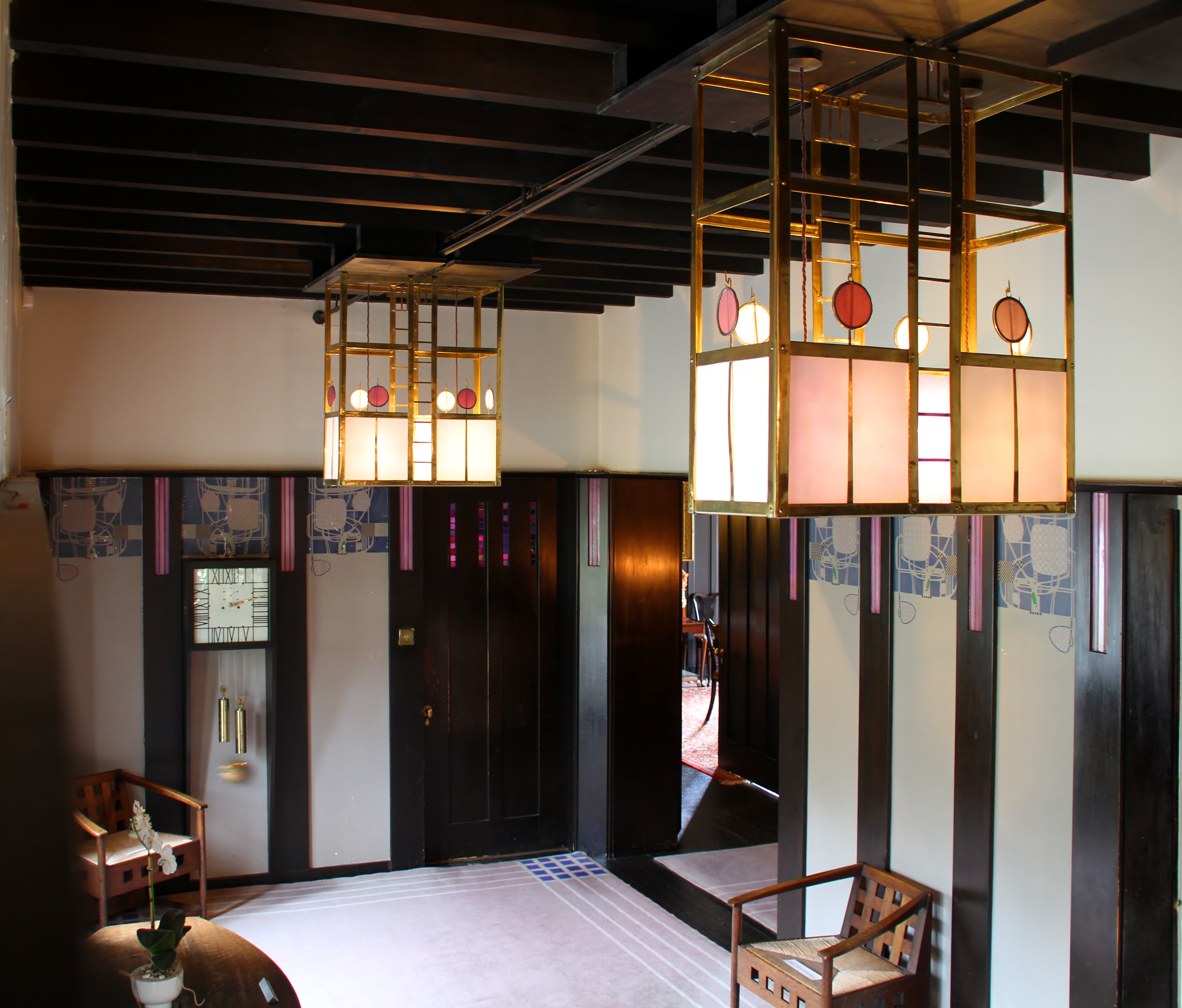
Interior hallway view, Hill House, Helensburgh, Scotland, designed and built by Walter Blackie (1902–1904)

Art Nouveau had its roots in Britain, in the Arts and Crafts movement which started in the 1860s and reached international recognition by the 1880s. It called for better treatment of decorative arts, and took inspiration in medieval craftmanship and design, and nature. One notable early example of the Modern Style is Arthur Mackmurdo's design for the cover of his essay on the city churches of Sir Christopher Wren, published in 1883, as is his Mahogany chair from the same year.

Other important innovators in Britain included the graphic designers Aubrey Beardsley whose drawings featured the curved lines that became the most recognizable feature of the style. Free-flowing wrought iron from the 1880s could also be adduced, or some flat floral textile designs, most of which owed some impetus to patterns of 19th century design. Other British graphic artists who had an important place in the style included Walter Crane and Charles Ashbee.

The Liberty department store in London played an important role, through its colourful stylised floral designs for textiles, and the silver, pewter, and jewellery designs of Manxman (of Scottish descent) Archibald Knox. His jewellery designs in materials and forms broke away entirely from the historical traditions of jewellery design.

For Art Nouveau architecture and furniture design, the most important centre in Britain was Glasgow, with the creations of Charles Rennie Mackintosh and the Glasgow School, whose work was inspired by Scottish baronial architecture and Japanese design. Beginning in 1895, Mackintosh displayed his designs at international expositions in London, Vienna, and Turin; his designs particularly influenced the Secession Style in Vienna. His architectural creations included the Glasgow Herald Building (1894) and the library of the Glasgow School of Art (1897). He also established a reputation as a furniture designer and decorator, working closely with his wife, the painter and designer Margaret Macdonald Mackintosh. Together they created striking designs that combined geometric straight lines with gently curving floral decoration, particularly a symbol of the style, the Glasgow Rose".

Léon-Victor Solon, made an important contribution to Art Nouveau ceramics as art director at Mintons. He specialised in plaques and in tube-lined vases marketed as "secessionist ware" (assumed to be named after the Viennese art movement). He provided art nouveau designs for other clients, textile designs for the Leek silk industry and bookbindings (specifically doublures) for the bookbinder G.T. Bagguley of Newcastle-under-Lyme.

George Skipper was perhaps the most active Art Nouveau architect in England. The Edward Everard building in Bristol, built during 1900–01 to house the printing works of Edward Everard, features an Art Nouveau façade. The figures depicted are of Johannes Gutenberg and William Morris, both eminent in the field of printing. A winged figure symbolises the "Spirit of Light", while a figure holding a lamp and mirror symbolises light and truth.

=== Jugendstil in Germany ===
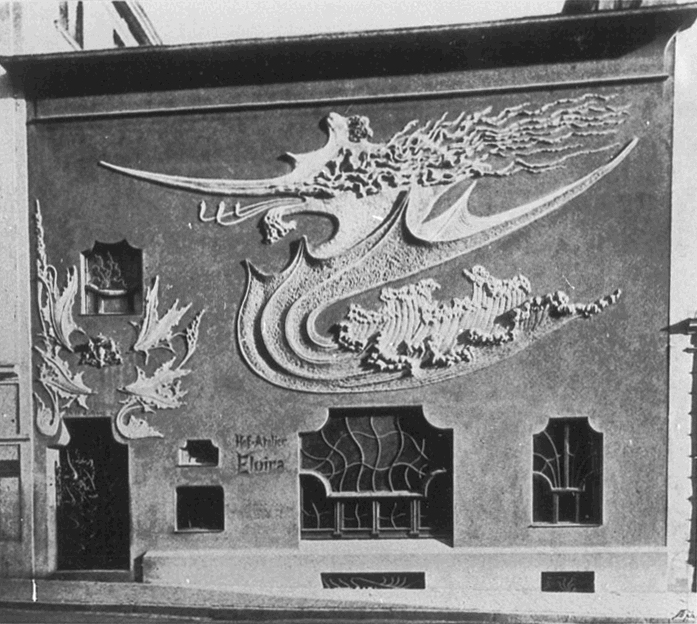
Façade of the Hofatelier Elvira photography studio in Munich, designed by August Endell (1896–1898)

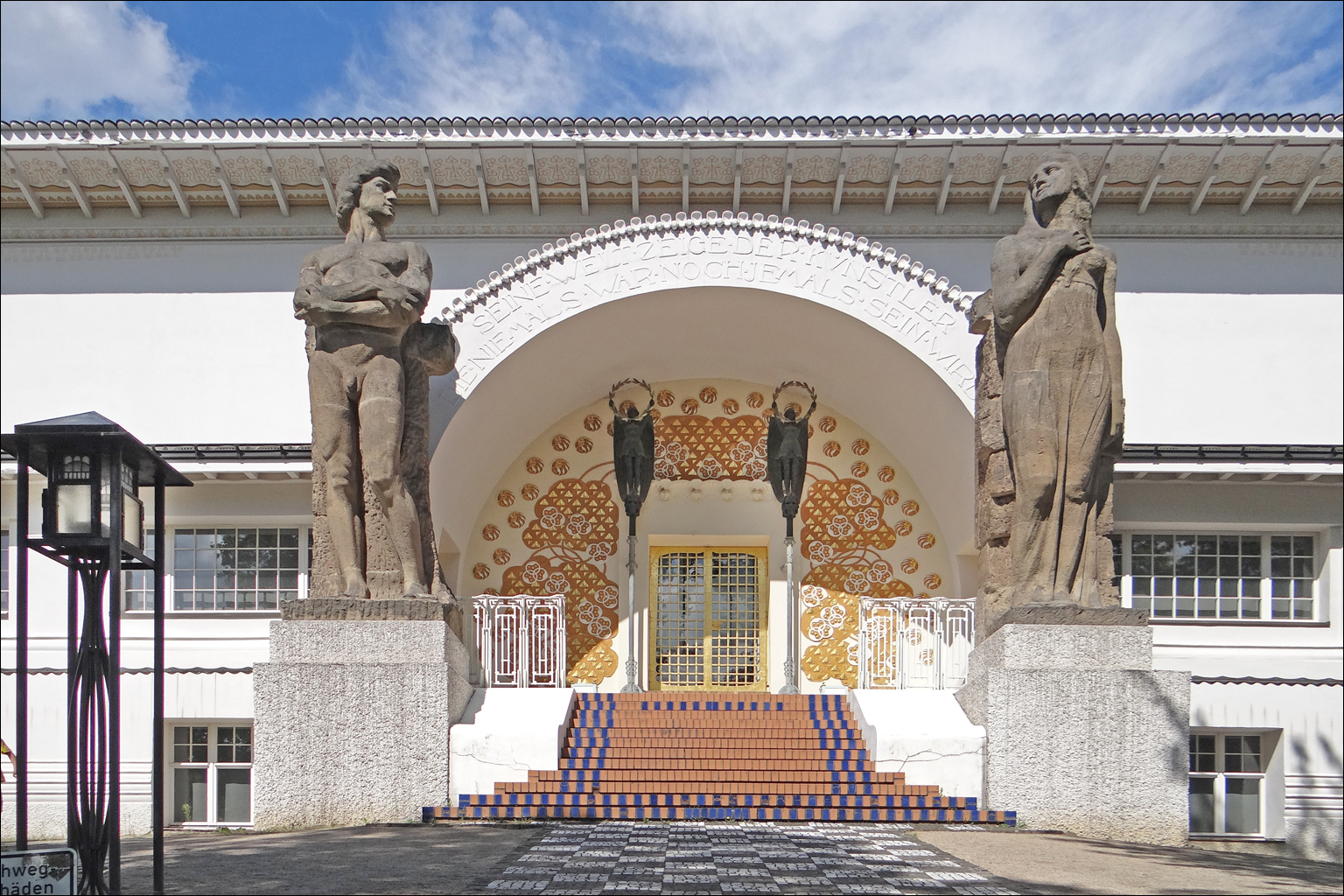
Ernst Ludwig House in Darmstadt Artists' Colony by Joseph Maria Olbrich (1900), now hosting Darmstadt Colony Museum

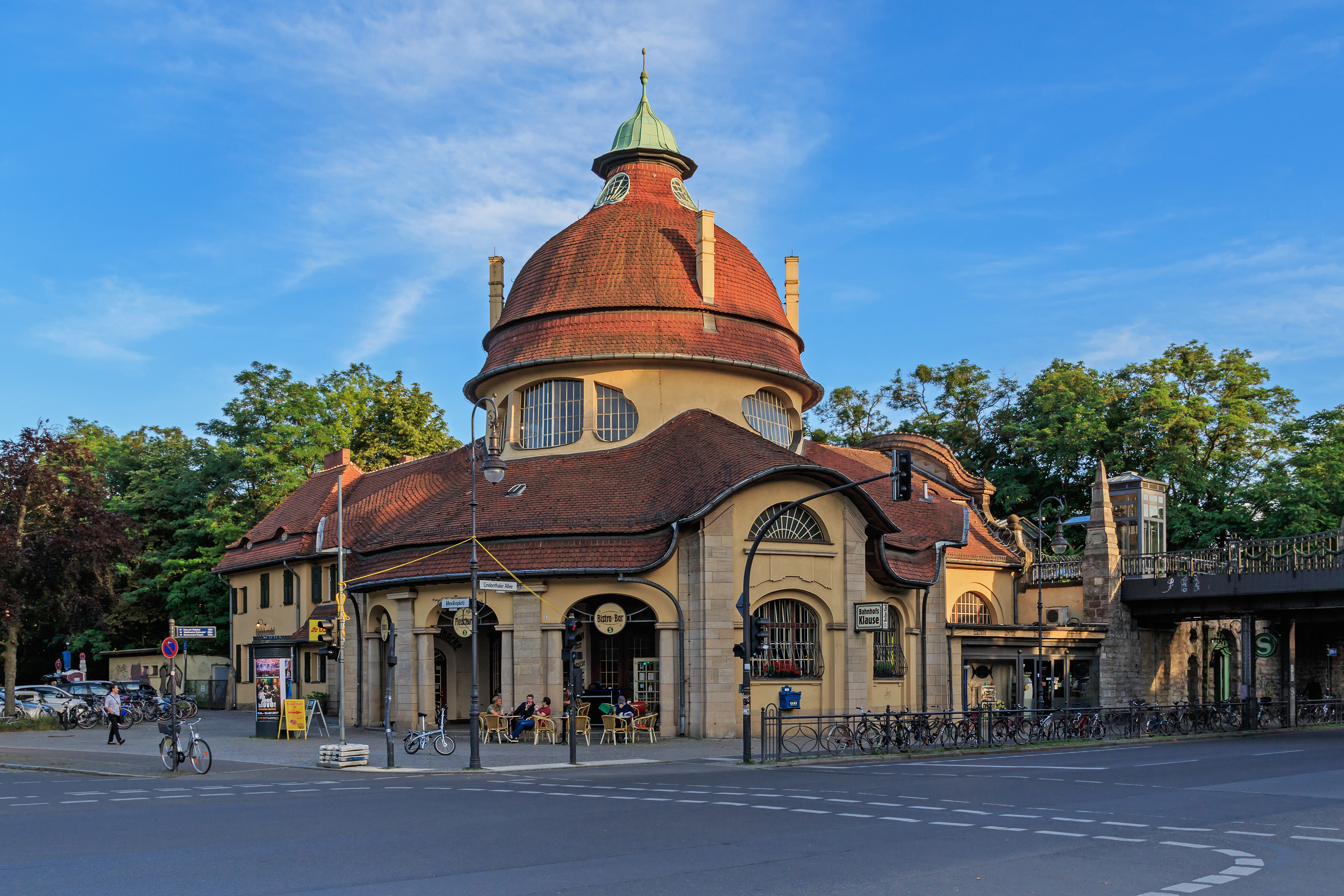
Mexikoplatz station in Berlin by Gustav Hart and Alfred Lesser (1902–1904)

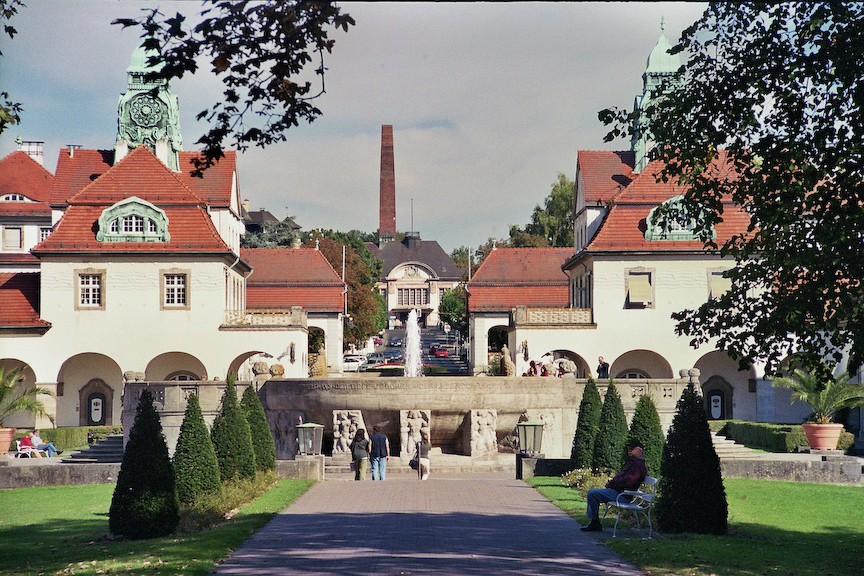
Spa complex Sprudelhof in Bad Nauheim (1905–1911)

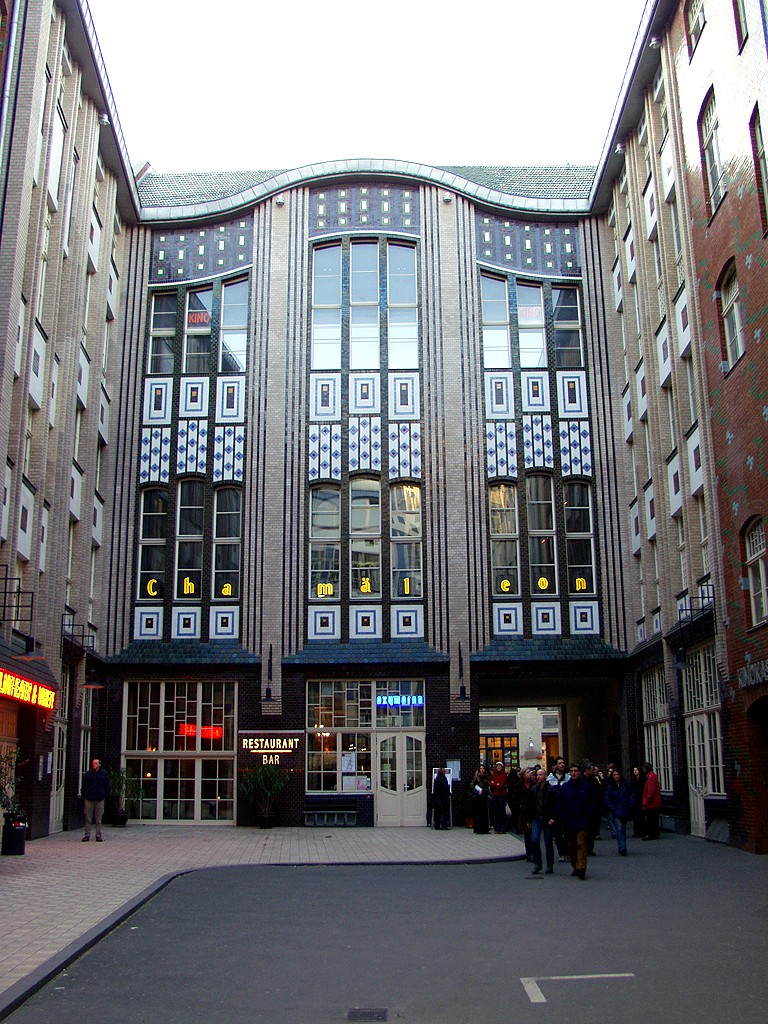
Hackesche Höfe in Berlin by Endell (1906)

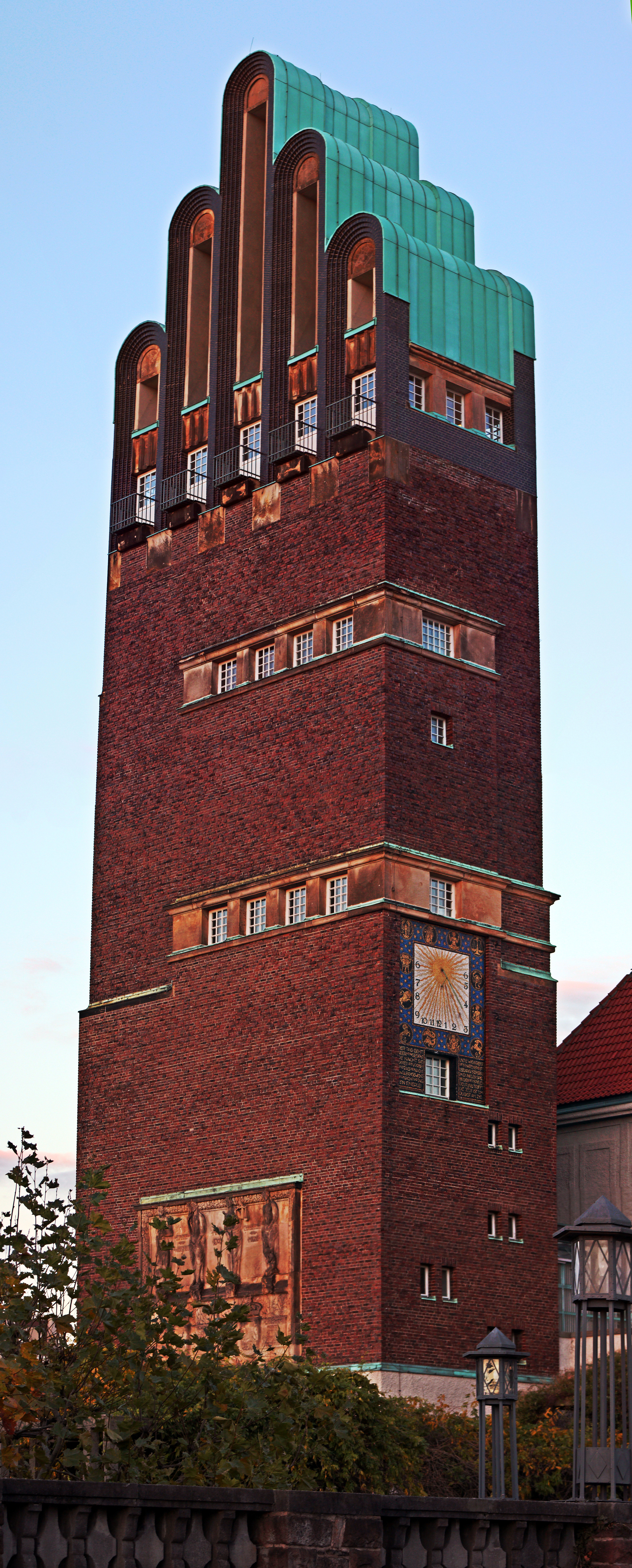
Wedding tower in Darmstadt Artists' Colony (1908)

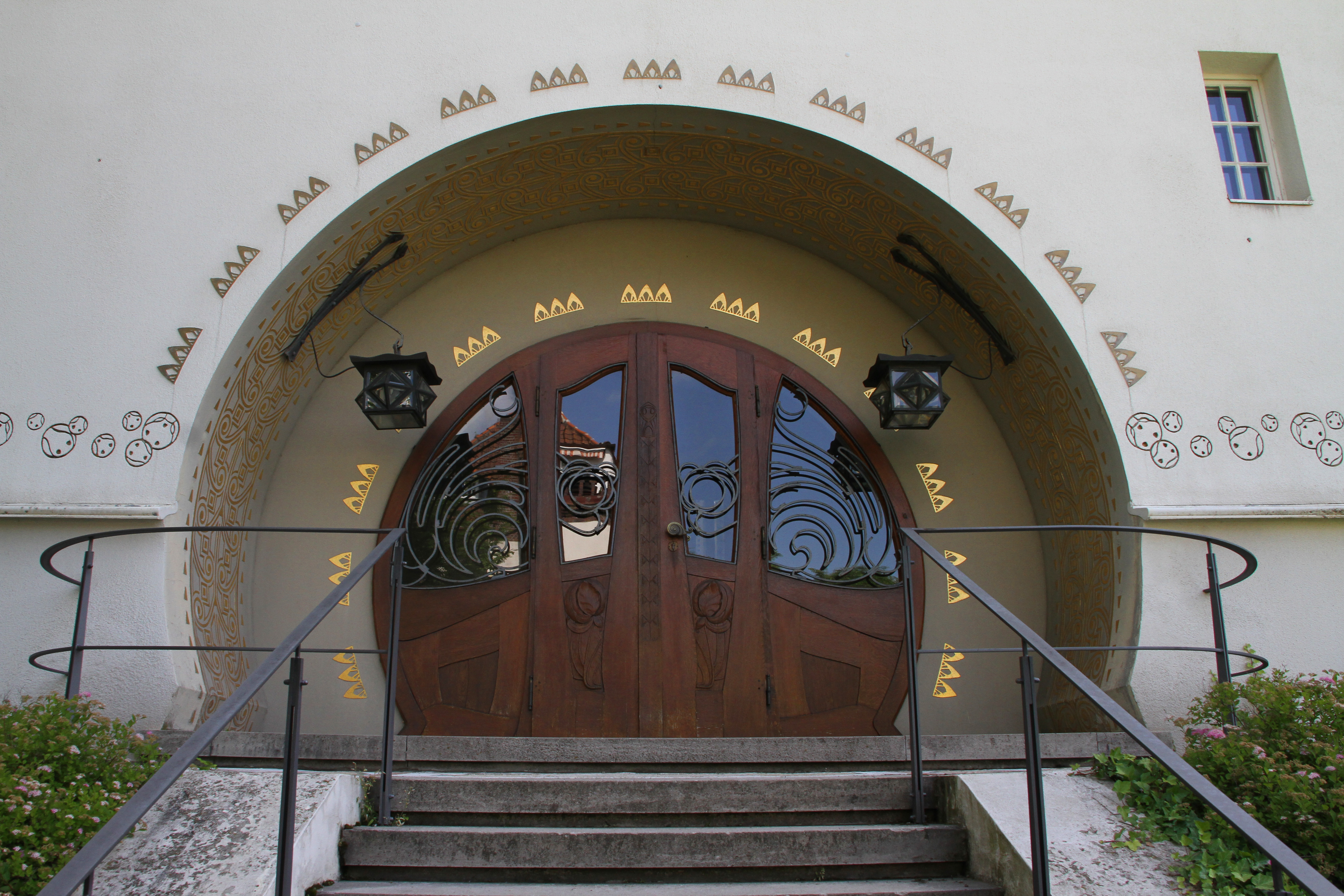
Entrance door of Großes Haus Glückert in Darmstadt Artists' Colony

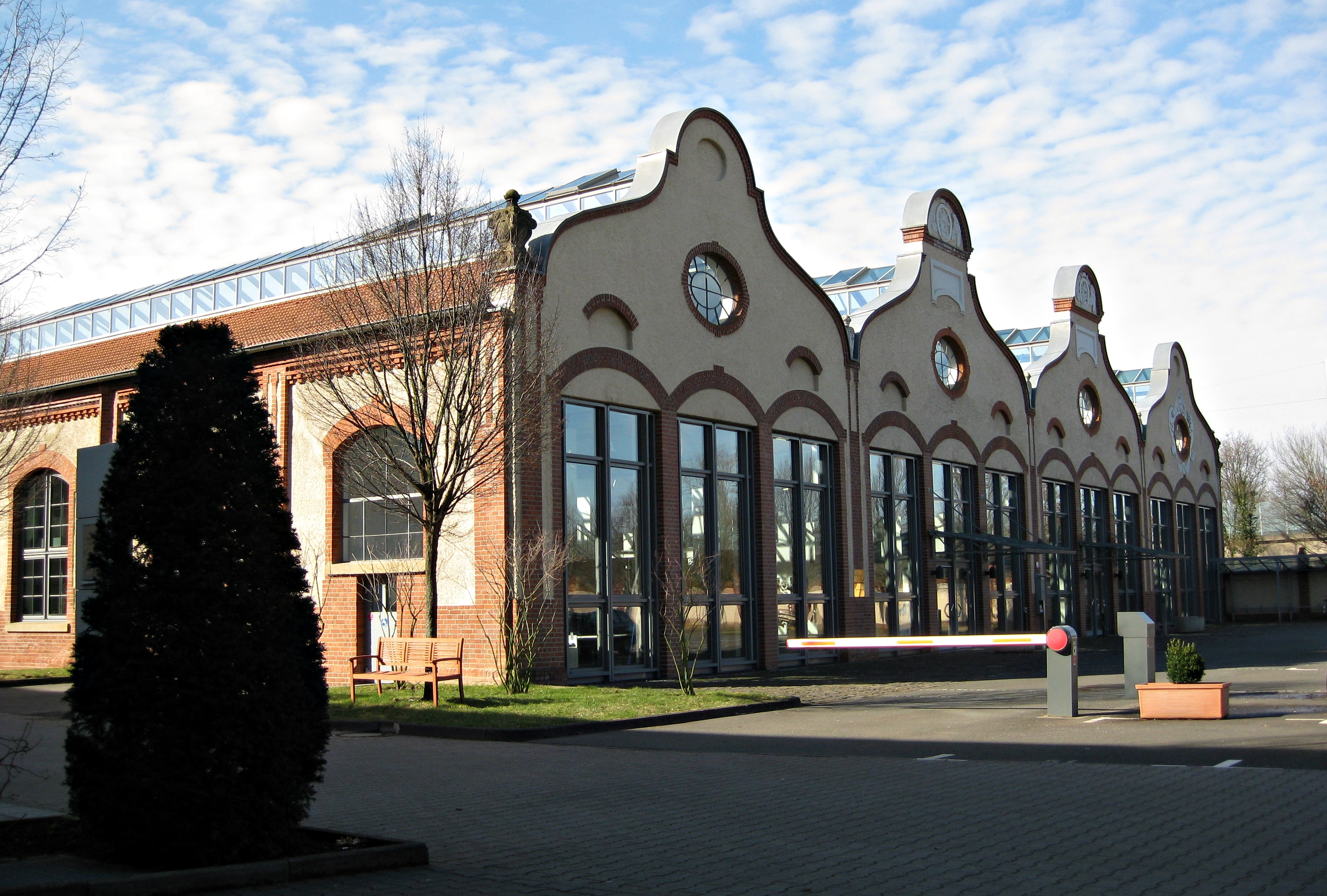
Façade of a former tram depot, now an office building, in Bonn

German Art Nouveau is commonly known by its German name, Jugendstil, or 'Youth Style'. The name is taken from the artistic journal, Jugend ('Youth'), which was published in Munich. The magazine was founded in 1896 by Georg Hirth, who remained editor until his death in 1916. The magazine survived until 1940. During the early 20th century, Jugendstil was applied only to the graphic arts. It referred especially to the forms of typography and graphic design found in German magazines such as Jugend, Pan, and Simplicissimus. Jugendstil was later applied to other versions of Art Nouveau in Germany, the Netherlands. The term was borrowed from German by several languages of the Baltic states and Nordic countries to describe Art Nouveau (see Naming section).

In 1892 Georg Hirth chose the name Munich Secession for the Association of Visual Artists of Munich. The Vienna Secession, founded in 1897, and the Berlin Secession also took their names from the Munich group.

The journals Jugend and Simplicissimus, published in Munich, and Pan, published in Berlin, were important proponents of the Jugendstil. Jugendstil art combined sinuous curves and more geometric lines, and was used for covers of novels, advertisements, and exhibition posters. Designers often created original styles of typeface that worked harmoniously with the image, e.g. Arnold Böcklin typeface in 1904.

Otto Eckmann was one of the most prominent German artists associated with both Die Jugend and Pan. His favourite animal was the swan, and so great was his influence that the swan came to serve as the symbol of the entire movement. Another prominent designer in the style was Richard Riemerschmid, who made furniture, pottery, and other decorative objects in a sober, geometric style that pointed forward toward Art Deco. The Swiss artist Hermann Obrist, living in Munich, illustrated the coup de fouet or whiplash motif, a highly stylised double curve suggesting motion taken from the stem of the cyclamen flower.

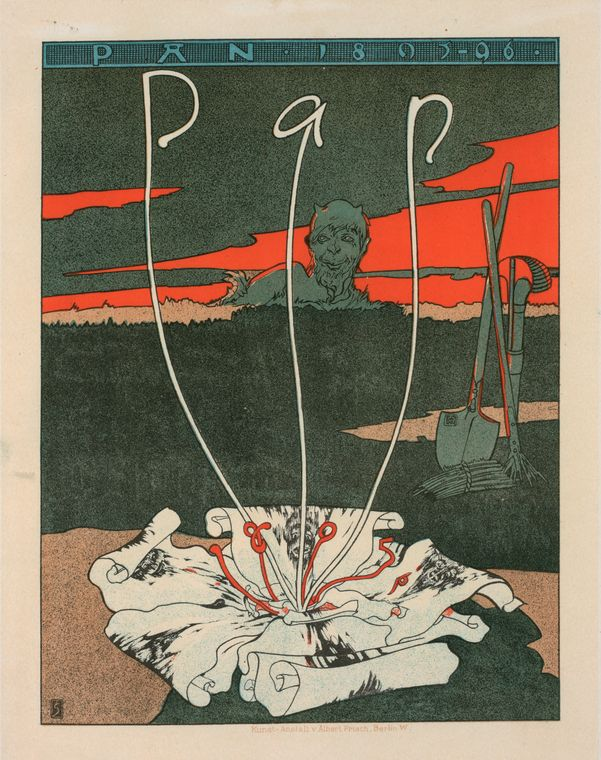
Cover of Pan magazine by Joseph Sattler (1895)

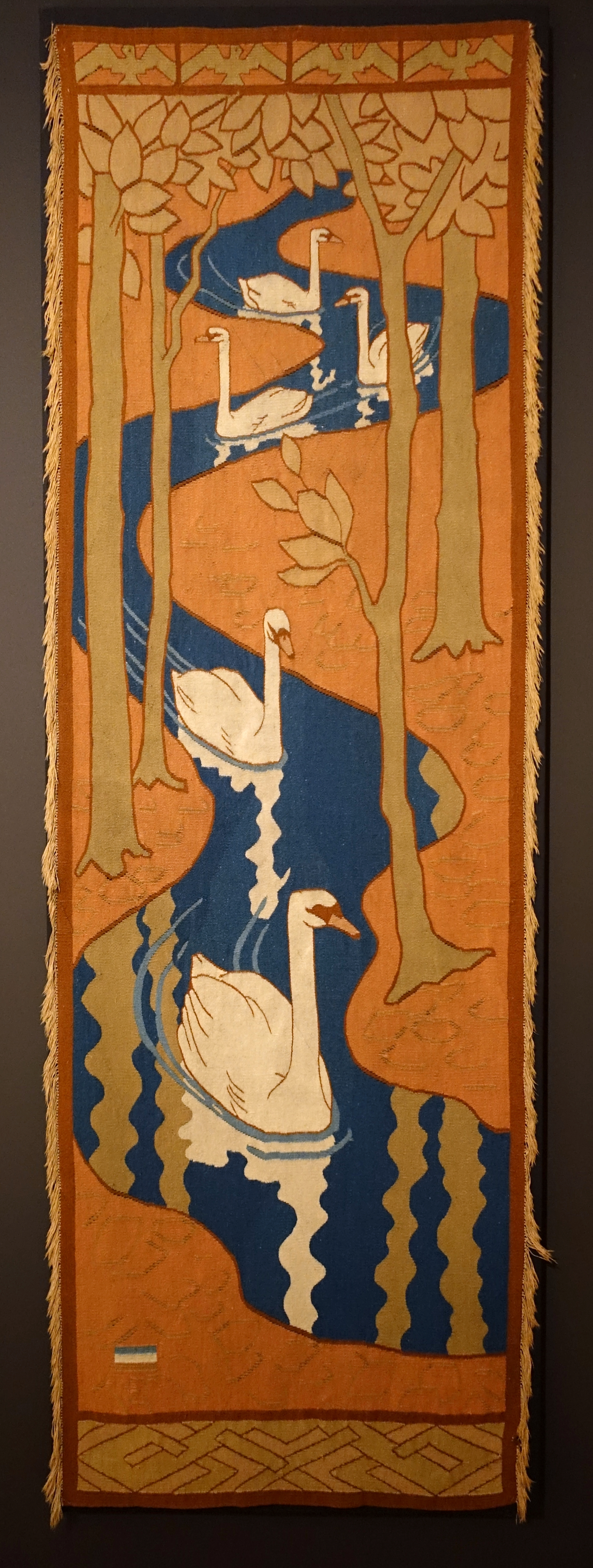
Tapestry The Five Swans by Otto Eckmann (1896–97)

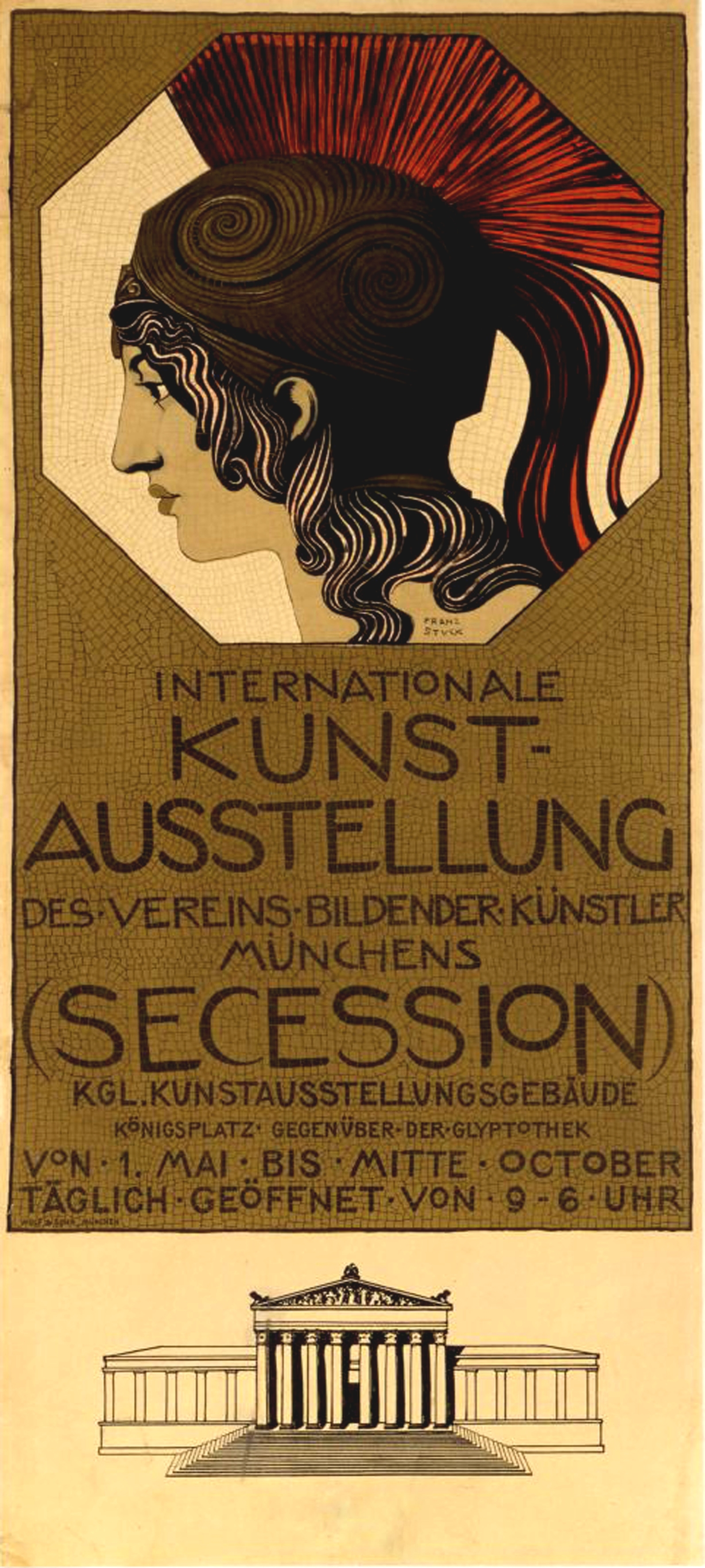
Poster of the Munich Secession by Franz Stuck (1898–1900)

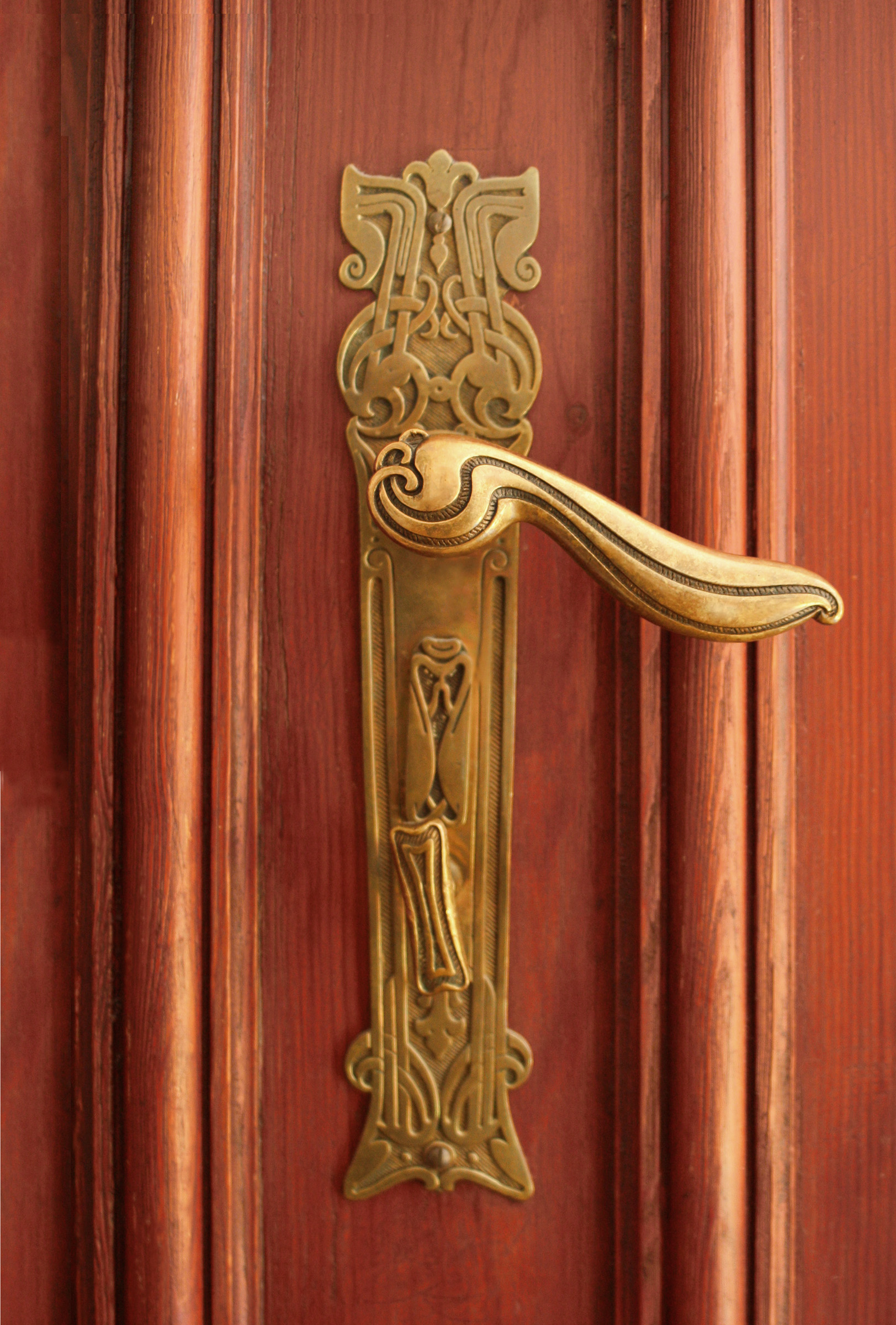
Jugendstil door handle in Berlin (c. 1900)

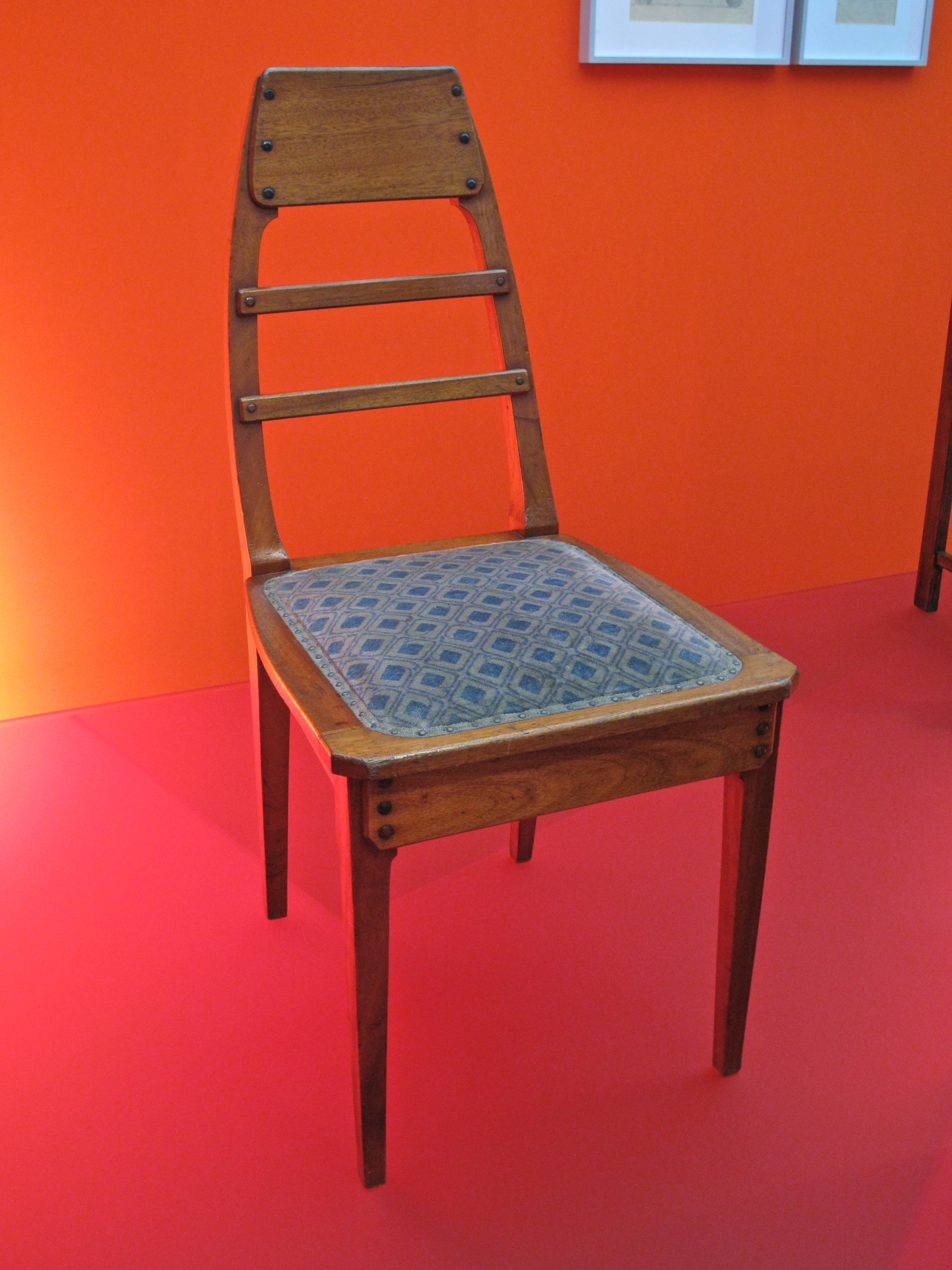
Chair by Richard Riemerschmid (1902)

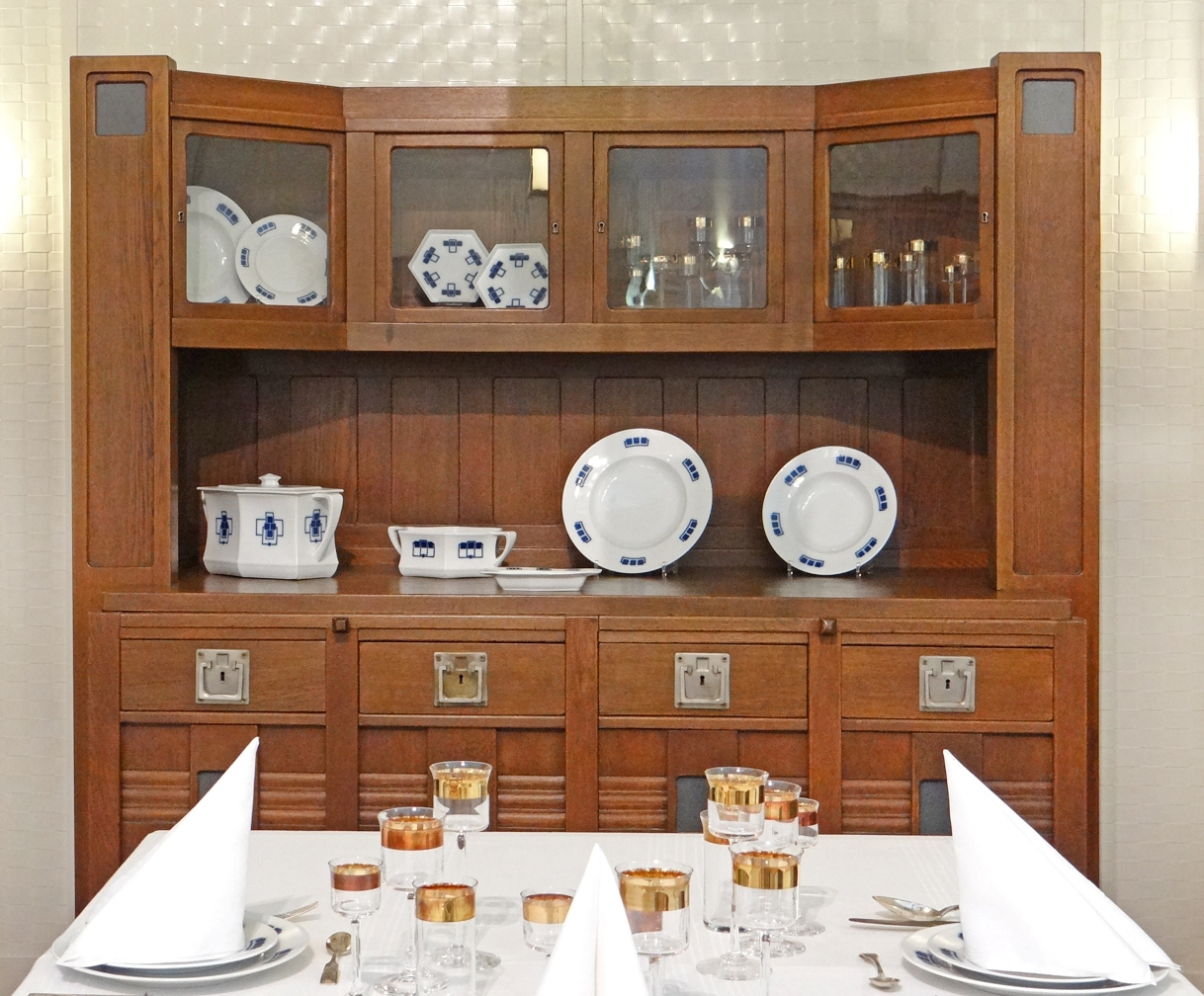
Jugendstil dining room set and dishes by Peter Behrens (1900–01)

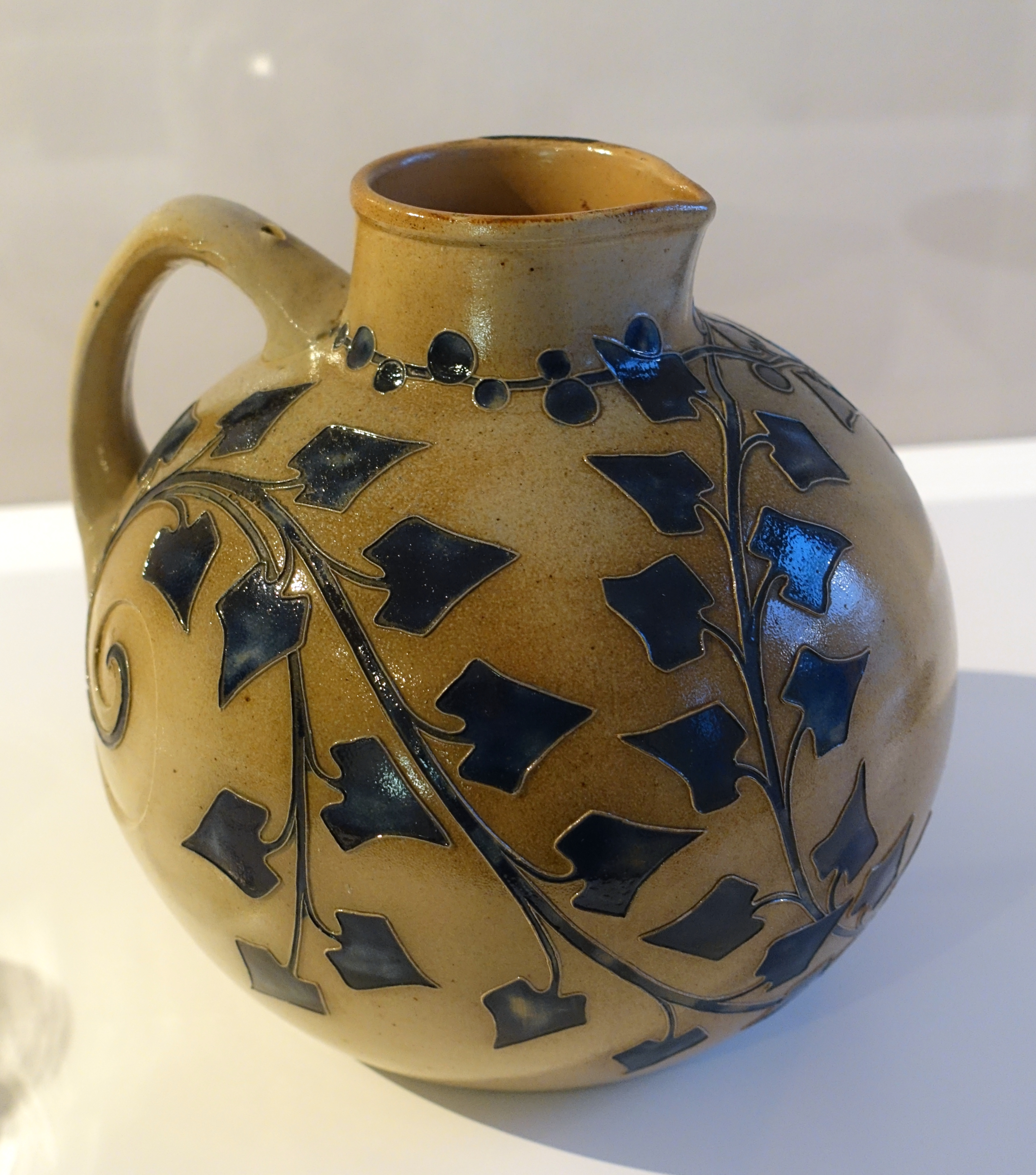
Stoneware jug by Richard Riemerschmid (1902)

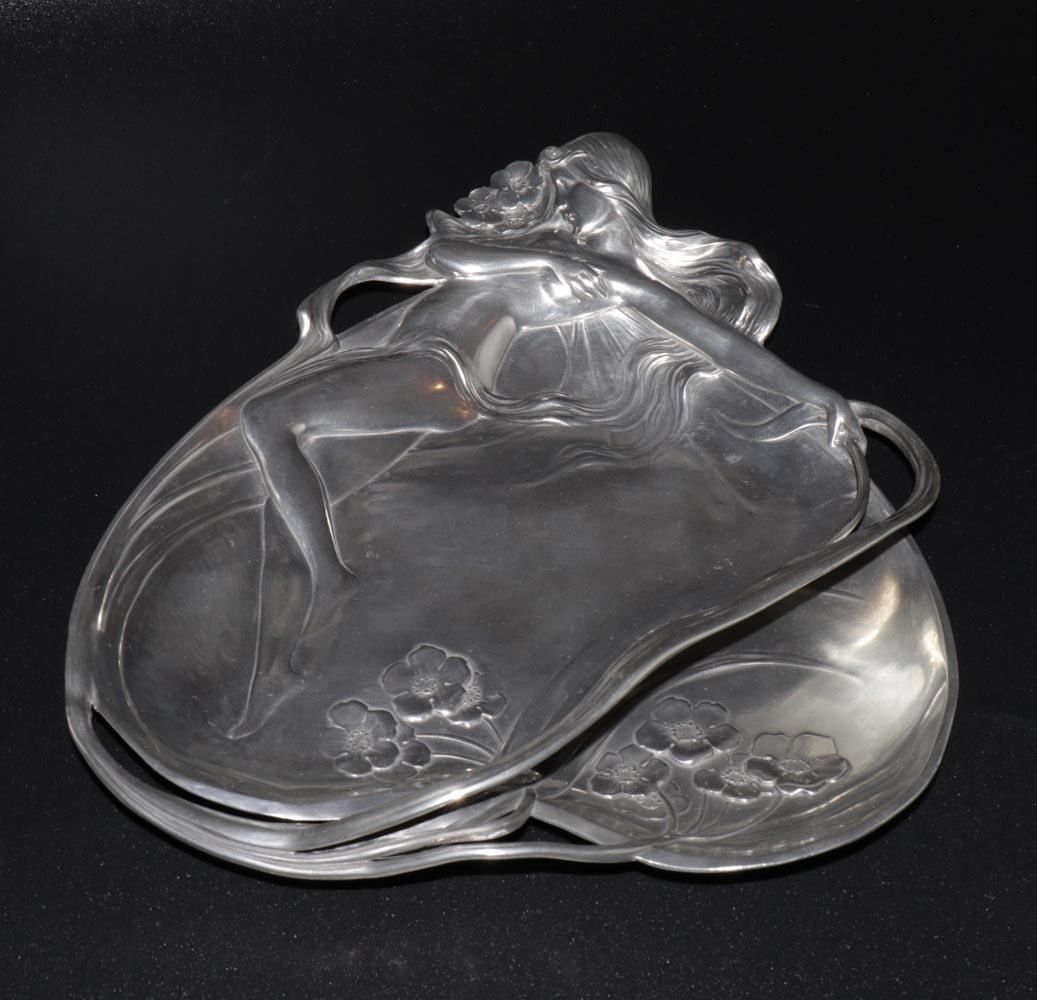
Jugendstil pewter dish by WMF, design no. 232 (c. 1906)

The Darmstadt Artists' Colony was founded in 1899 by Ernest Ludwig, Grand Duke of Hesse. The architect who built Grand Duke's house, as well as the largest structure of the colony (Wedding tower), was Joseph Maria Olbrich, one of the Vienna Secession founders. Other notable artists of the colony were Peter Behrens and Hans Christiansen. Ernest Ludwig also commissioned to rebuild the spa complex in Bad Nauheim at the beginning of century. A completely new Sprudelhof complex was constructed in 1905–1911 under the direction of Wilhelm Jost and attained one of the main objectives of Jugendstil: a synthesis of all the arts. Another member of the reigning family who commissioned an Art Nouveau structure was Princess Elisabeth of Hesse and by Rhine. She founded Marfo-Mariinsky Convent in Moscow in 1908 and its katholikon is recognized as an Art Nouveau masterpiece.

Another notable union in German Empire was the Deutscher Werkbund, founded in 1907 in Munich at the instigation of Hermann Muthesius by artists of Darmstadt Colony Joseph Maria Olbrich, Peter Behrens; by another founder of Vienna Secession Josef Hoffmann, as well as by Wiener Werkstätte (founded by Hoffmann), by Richard Riemerschmid, Bruno Paul and other artists and companies. Later Belgian Henry van de Velde joined the movement. (Note: Some sources, e.g. Werkbund archive, cite Van de Velde as one of the founding members.) The Grand-Ducal School of Arts and Crafts, founded by him in Weimar, was a predecessor of Bauhaus, one of the most influential currents in Modernist architecture.

In Berlin, Jugendstil was chosen for the construction of several railway stations. The most notable is Bülowstraße by Bruno Möhring (1900–1902), other examples are Mexikoplatz (1902–1904), Botanischer Garten (1908–1909), Frohnau (1908–1910), Wittenbergplatz (1911–1913) and Pankow (1912–1914) stations. Another notable structure of Berlin is Hackesche Höfe (1906) which used polychrome glazed brick for the courtyard façade.

Art Nouveau in Strasbourg (then part of the German Empire as the capital of the Reichsland Elsaß-Lothringen) was a specific brand, in that it combined influences from Nancy and Brussels, with influences from Darmstadt and Vienna, to operate a local synthesis which reflected the history of the city between the Germanic and the French realms.

=== Secession in Austria–Hungary ===
==== Vienna Secession ====
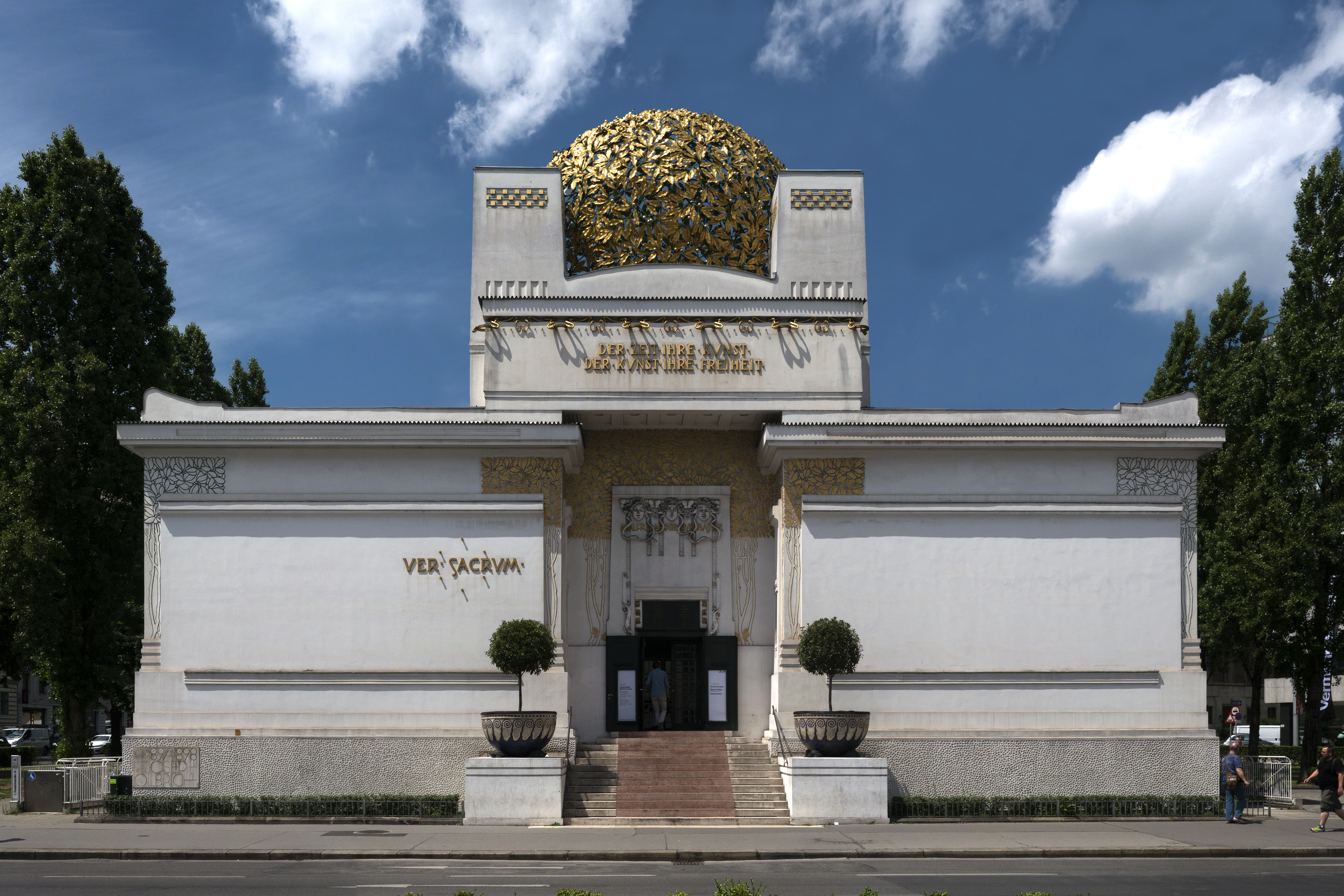
Secession Hall in Vienna by Joseph Maria Olbrich (1897–98)

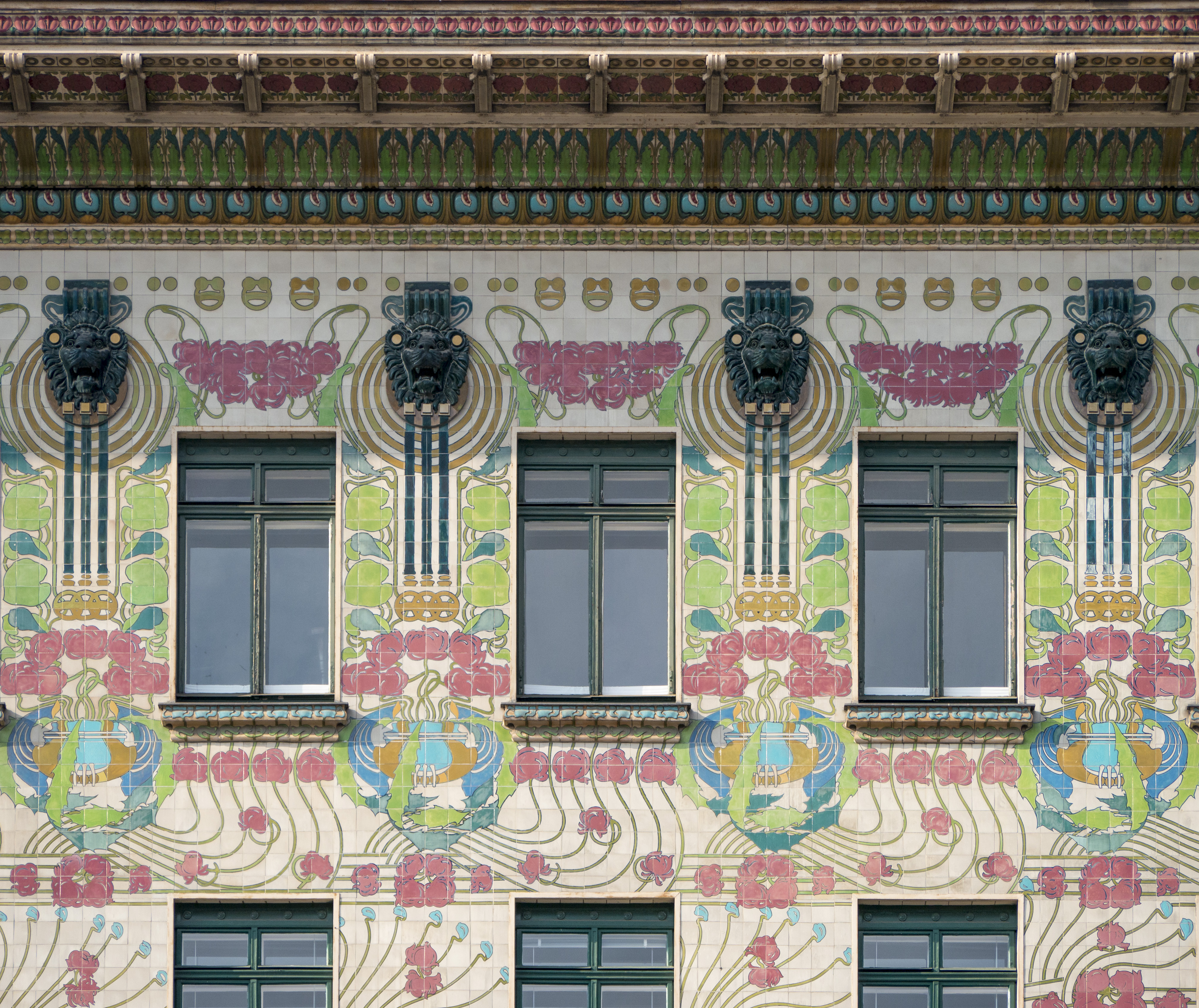
Floral design by Alois Ludwig on the façade of Maiolica House in Vienna by Otto Wagner (1898)

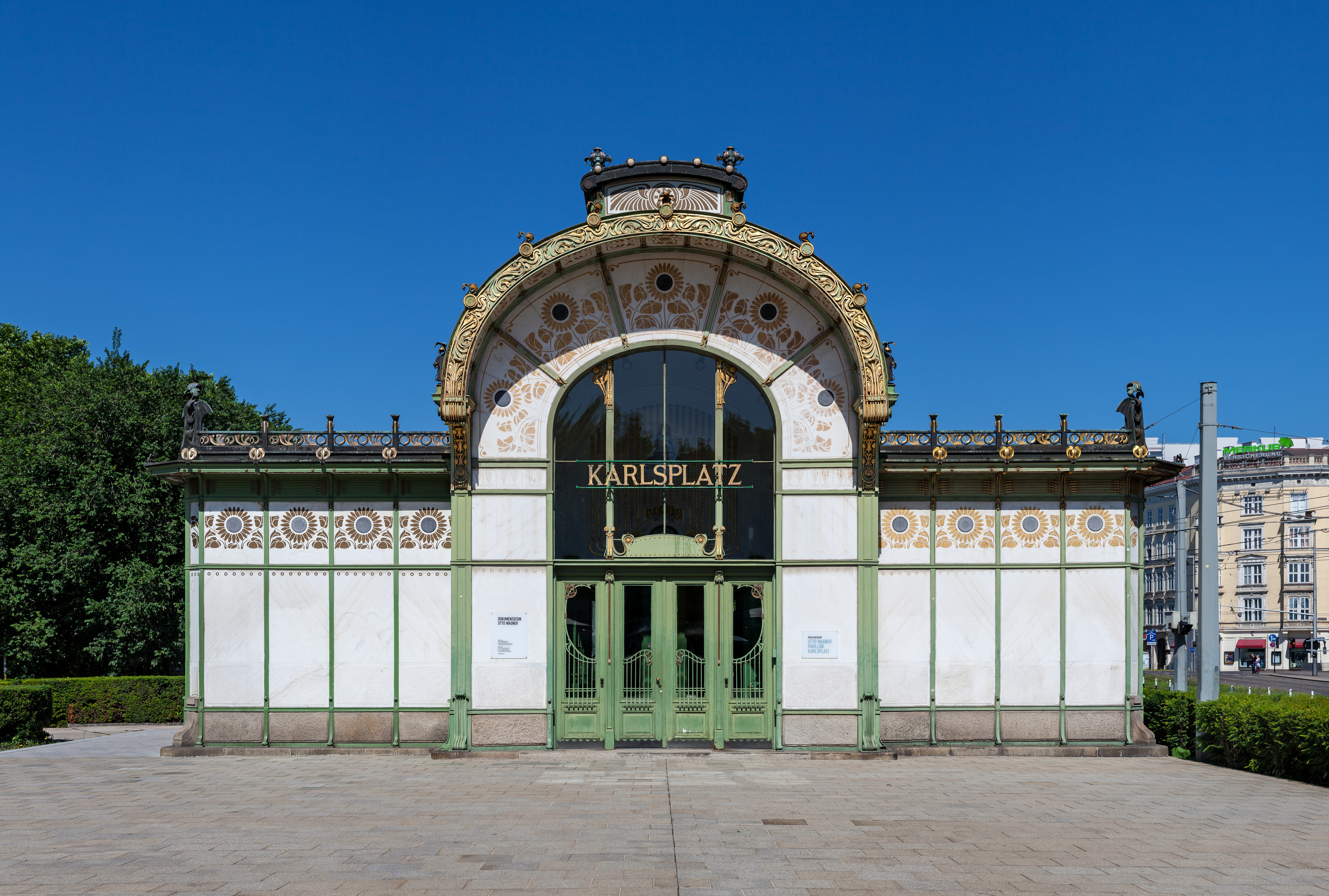
Karlsplatz Stadtbahn Station in Vienna by Wagner (1899)

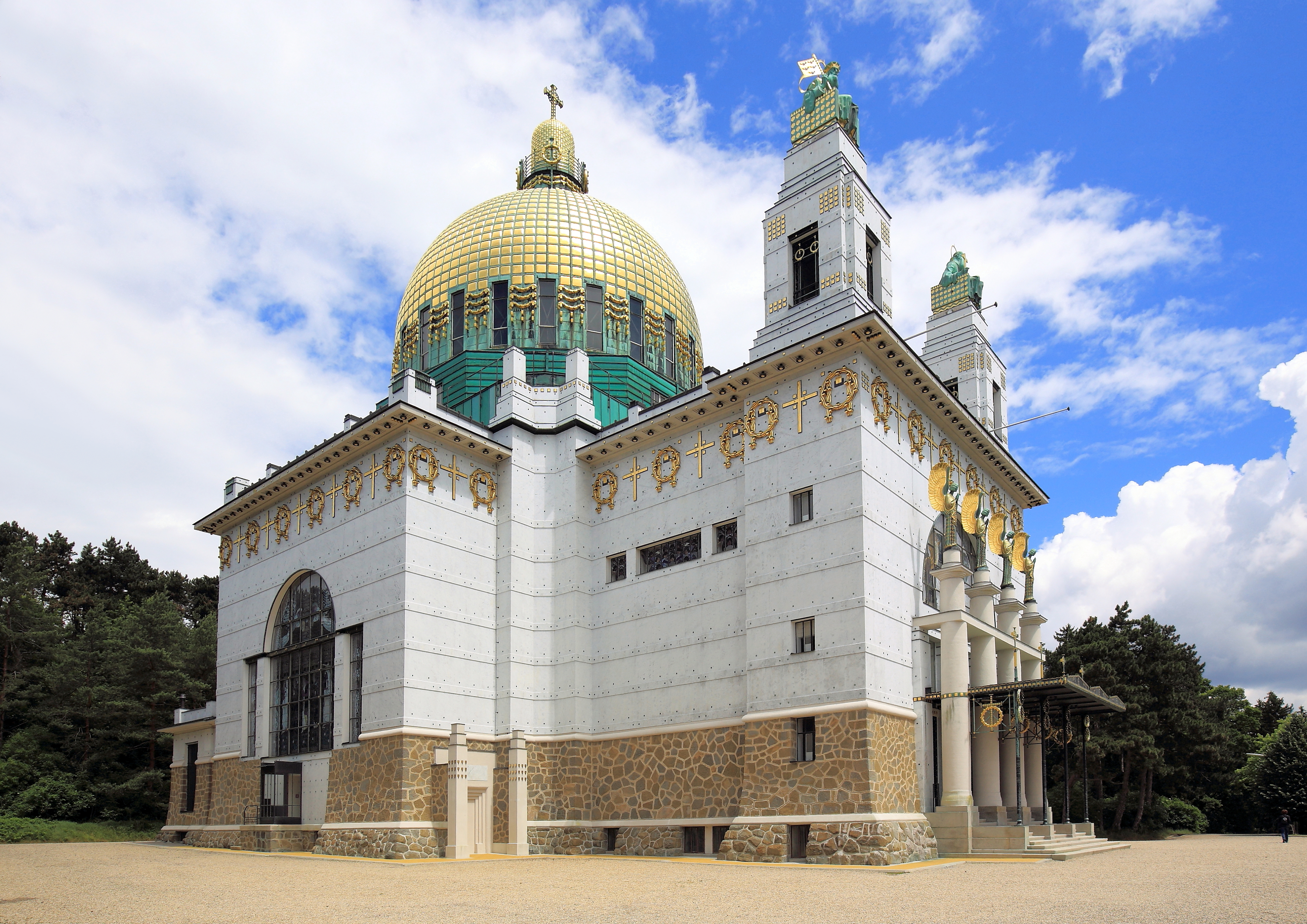
Church of St. Leopold in Vienna by Wagner (1903–1907)

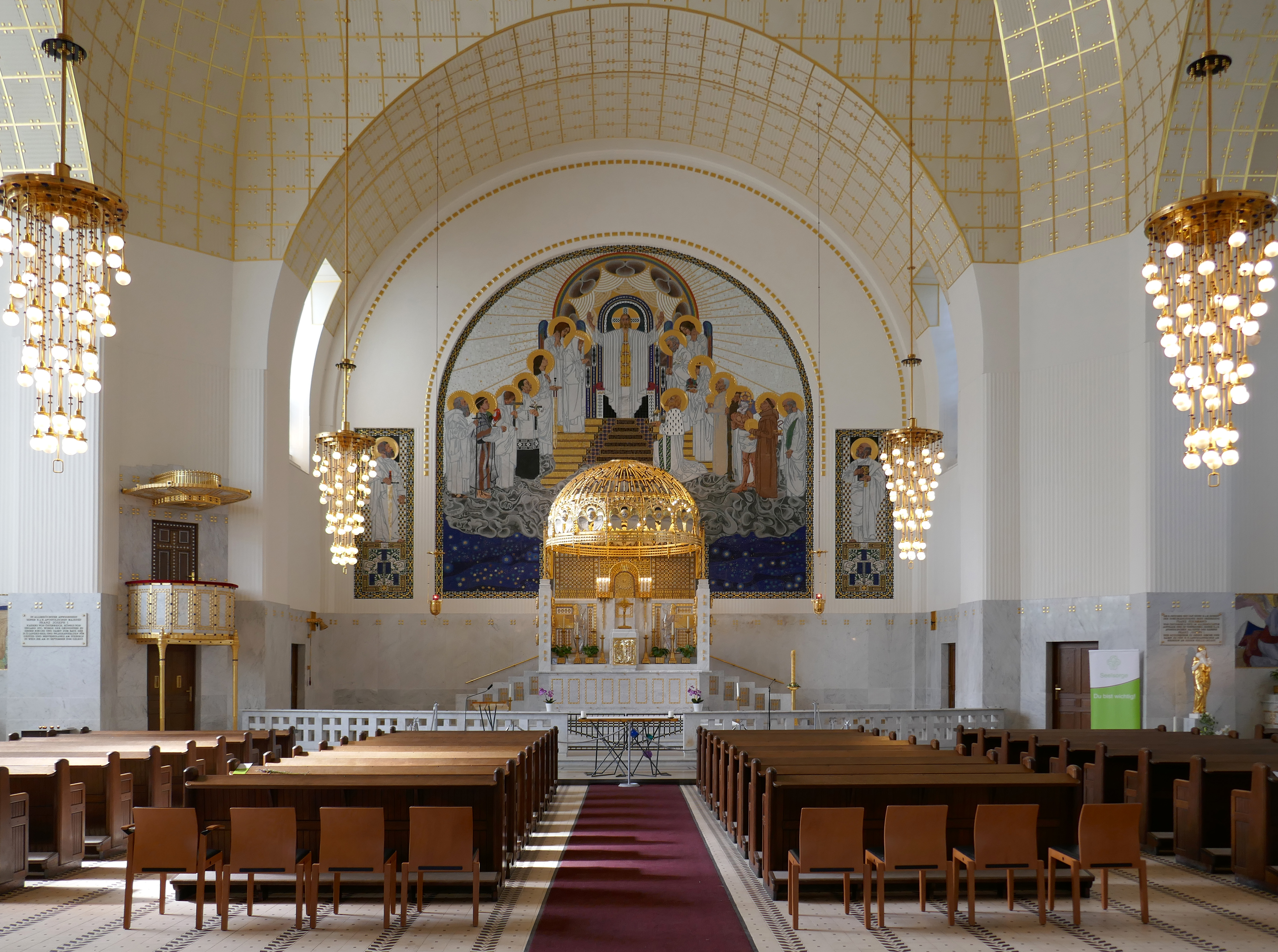
Interior of the Church of St. Leopold, with altarpiece by Leopold Forstner

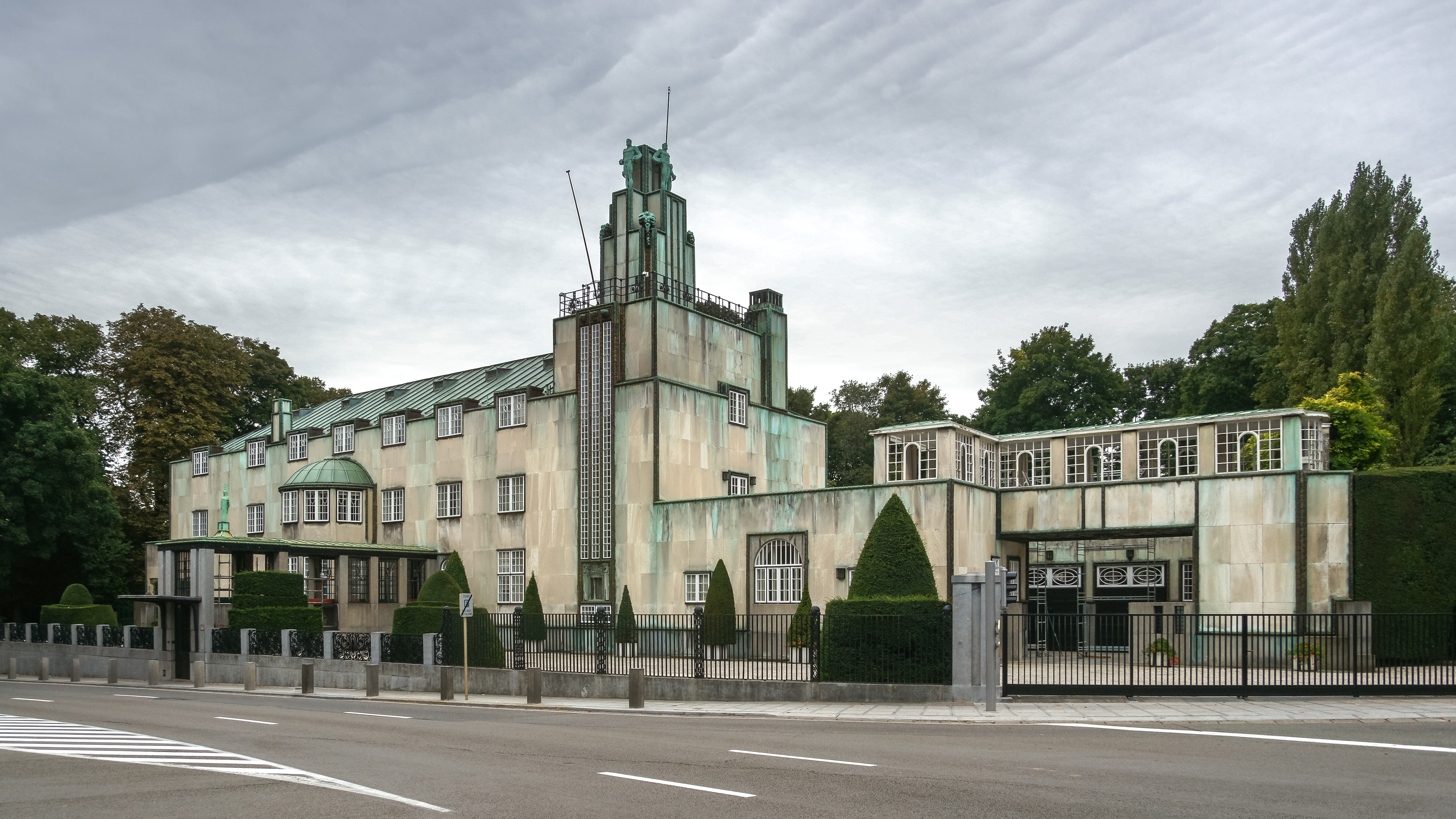
Stoclet Palace in Brussels by Josef Hoffmann (1905–1911)

Vienna became the centre of a distinct variant of Art Nouveau, which became known as the Vienna Secession. The movement took its name from Munich Secession established in 1892. Vienna Secession was founded in April 1897 by a group of artists that included Gustav Klimt, Koloman Moser, Josef Hoffmann, Joseph Maria Olbrich, Max Kurzweil, Ernst Stöhr, and others. The painter Klimt became the president of the group. They objected to the conservative orientation toward historicism expressed by Vienna Künstlerhaus, the official union of artists. The Secession founded a magazine, Ver Sacrum, to promote their works in all media. The architect Joseph Olbrich designed the domed Secession building in the new style, which became a showcase for the paintings of Gustav Klimt and other Secession artists.

Klimt became the best-known of the Secession painters, often erasing the border between fine art painting and decorative painting. Koloman Moser was an extremely versatile artist in the style; his work including magazine illustrations, architecture, silverware, ceramics, porcelain, textiles, stained glass windows, and furniture.

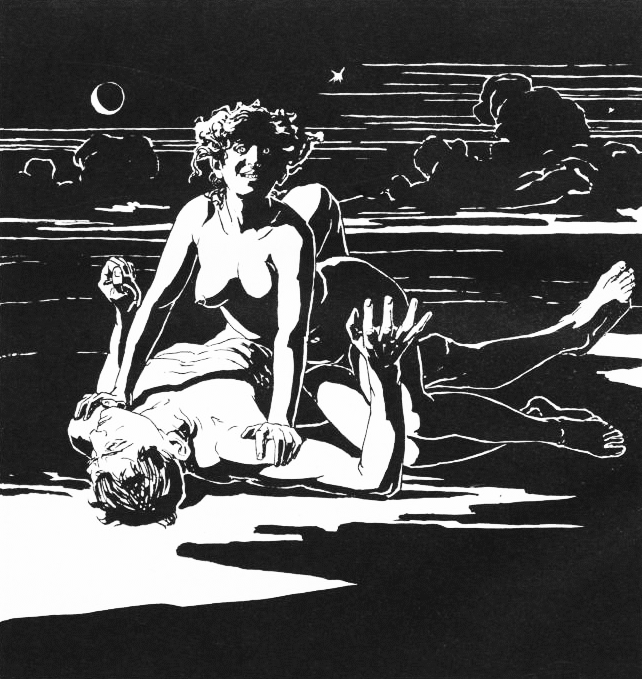
Vampire in Ver Sacrum, no. 12, p. 8, by Ernst Stöhr (1899)

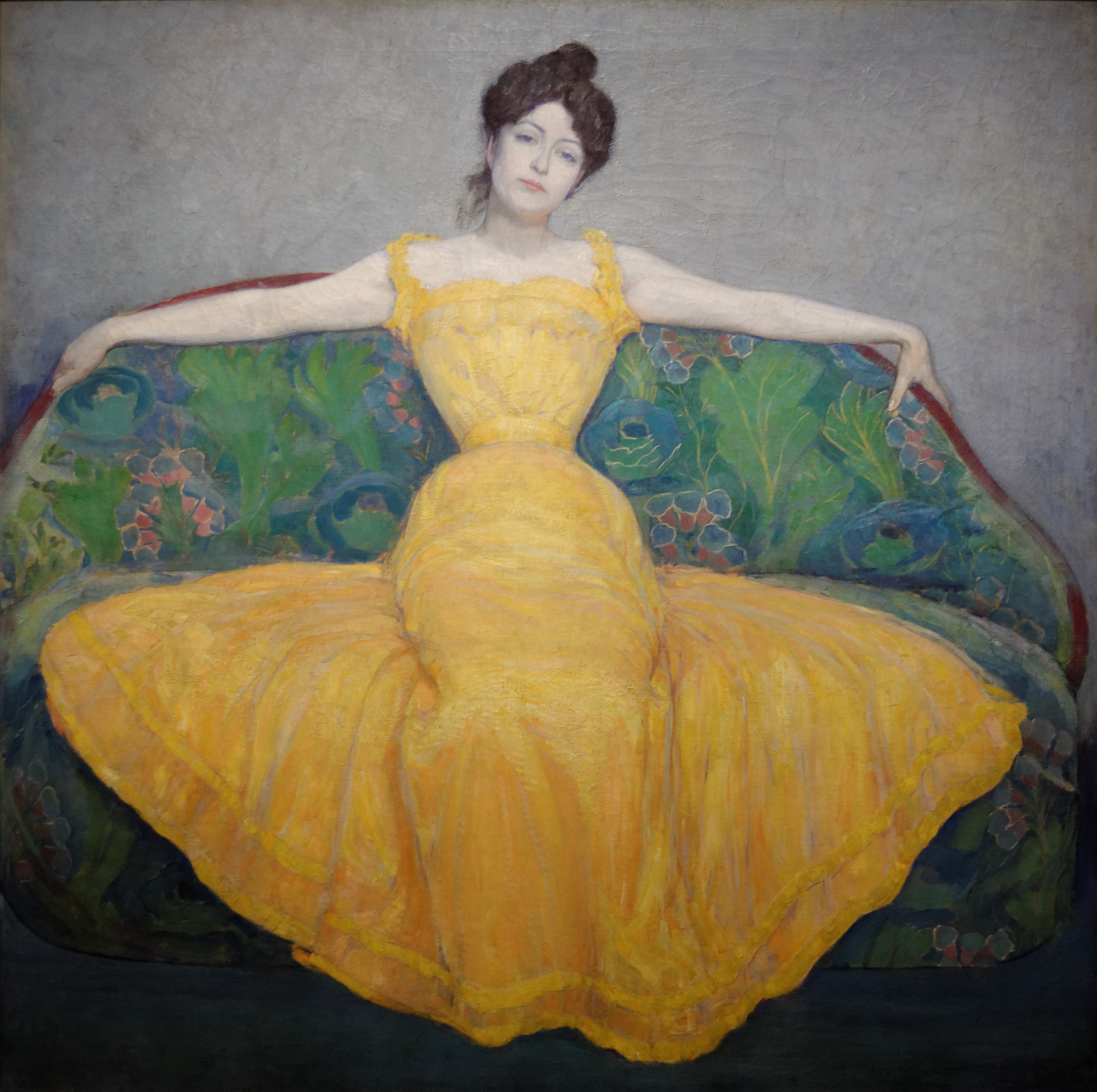
Woman in a Yellow Dress by Max Kurzweil (1899)

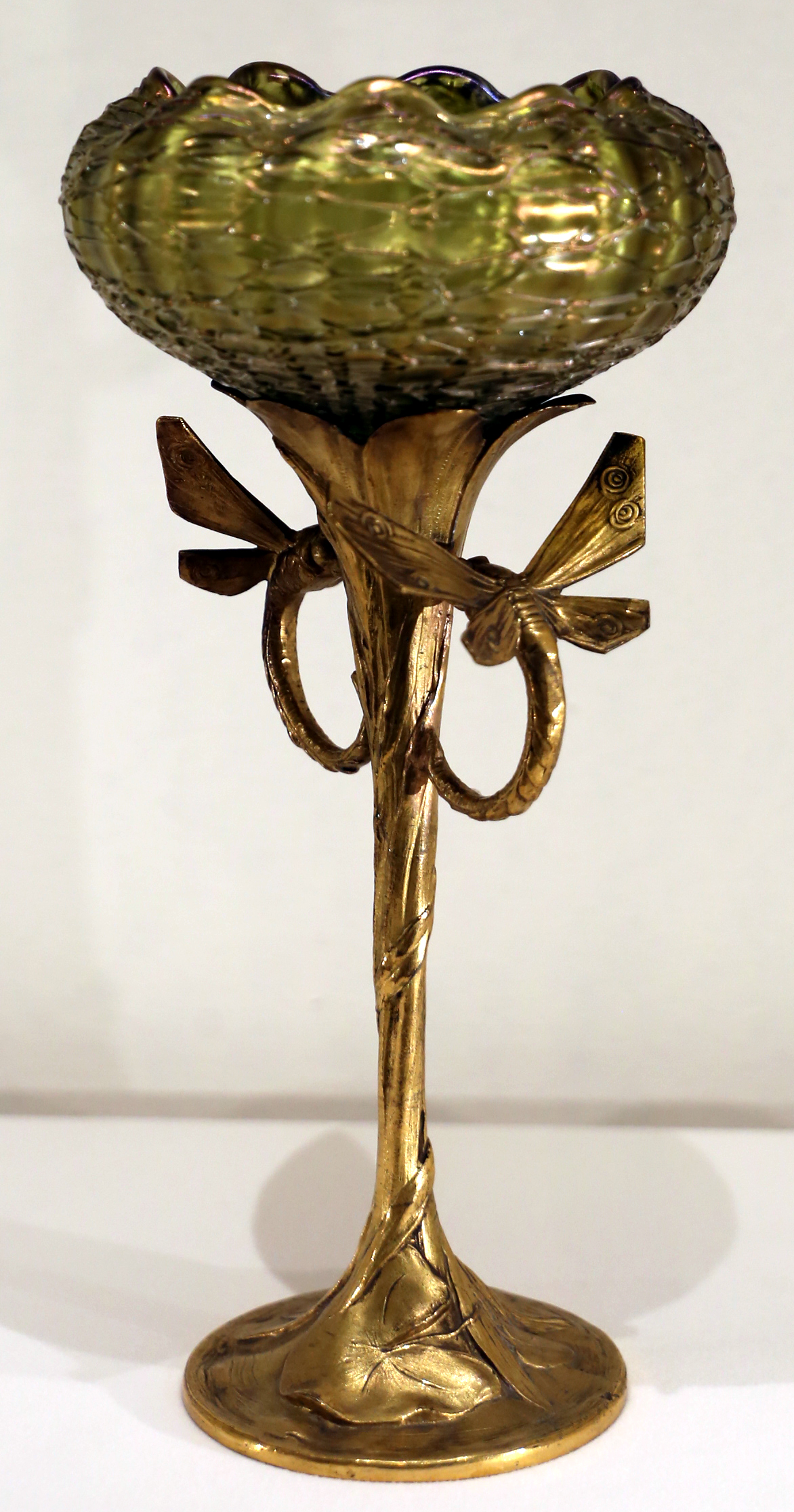
Vase by Johann Loetz Witwe (c. 1900)

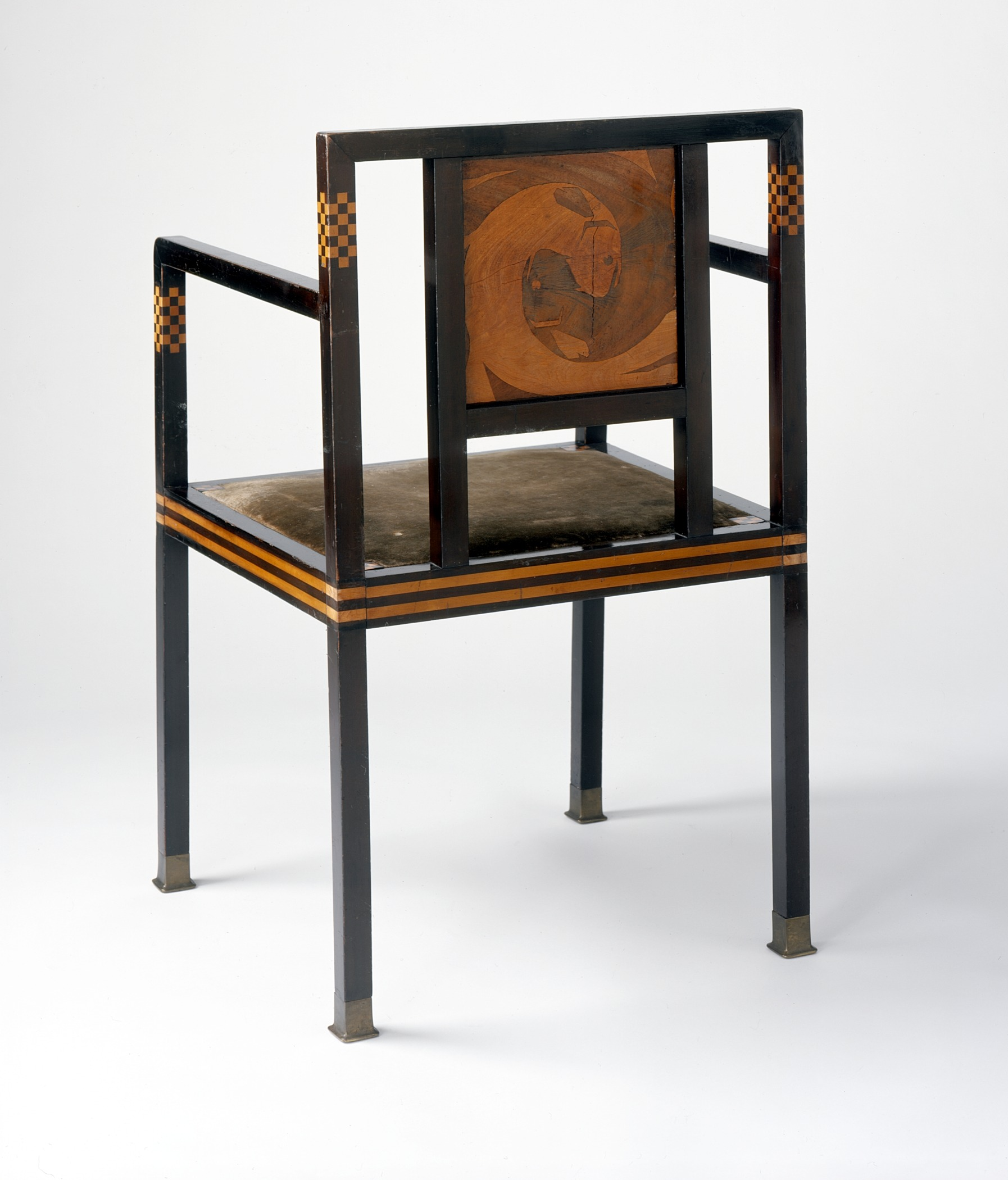
Armchair by Koloman Moser (c. 1900)

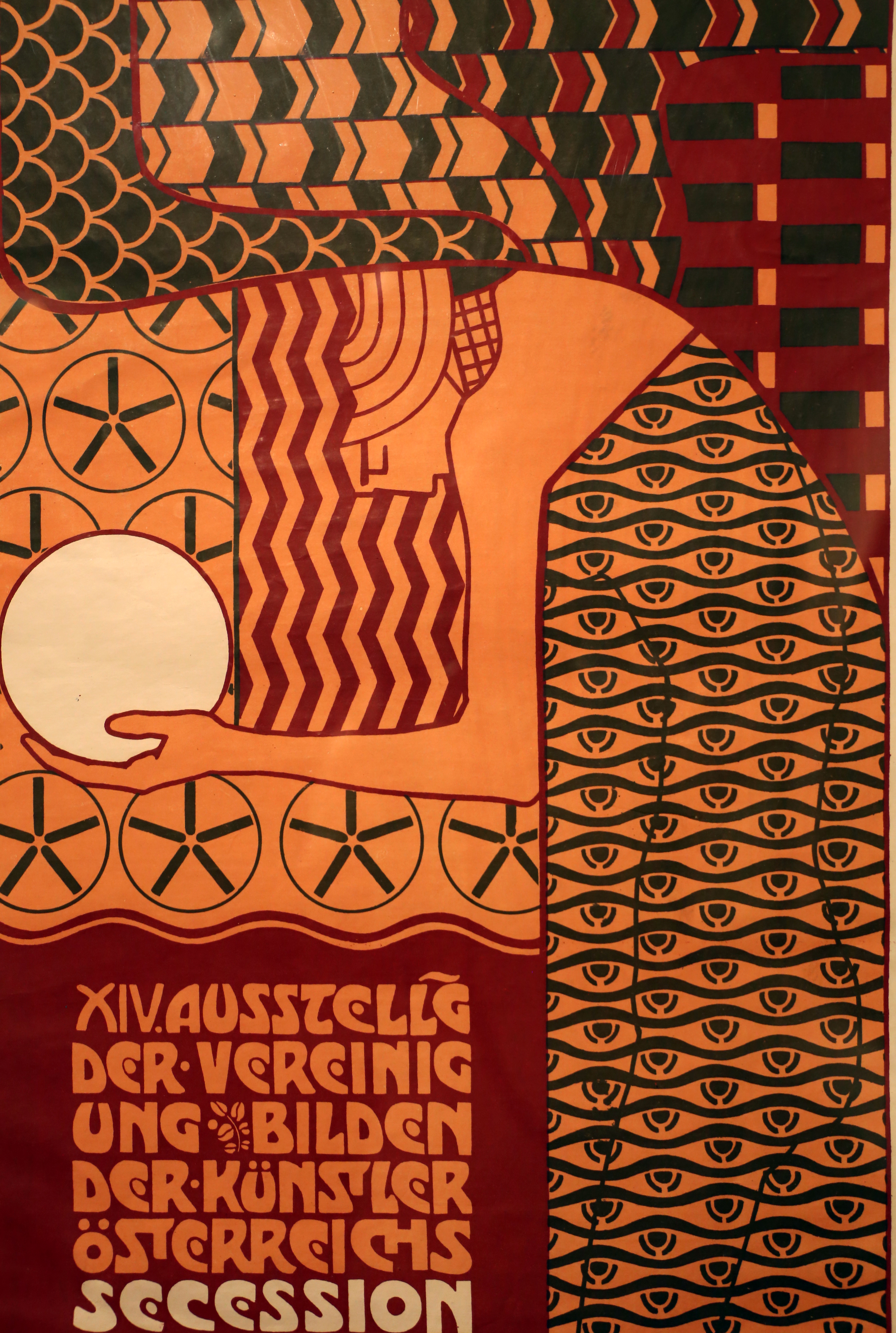
Poster for the 14th Secession Exhibit, by Alfred Roller (1902)

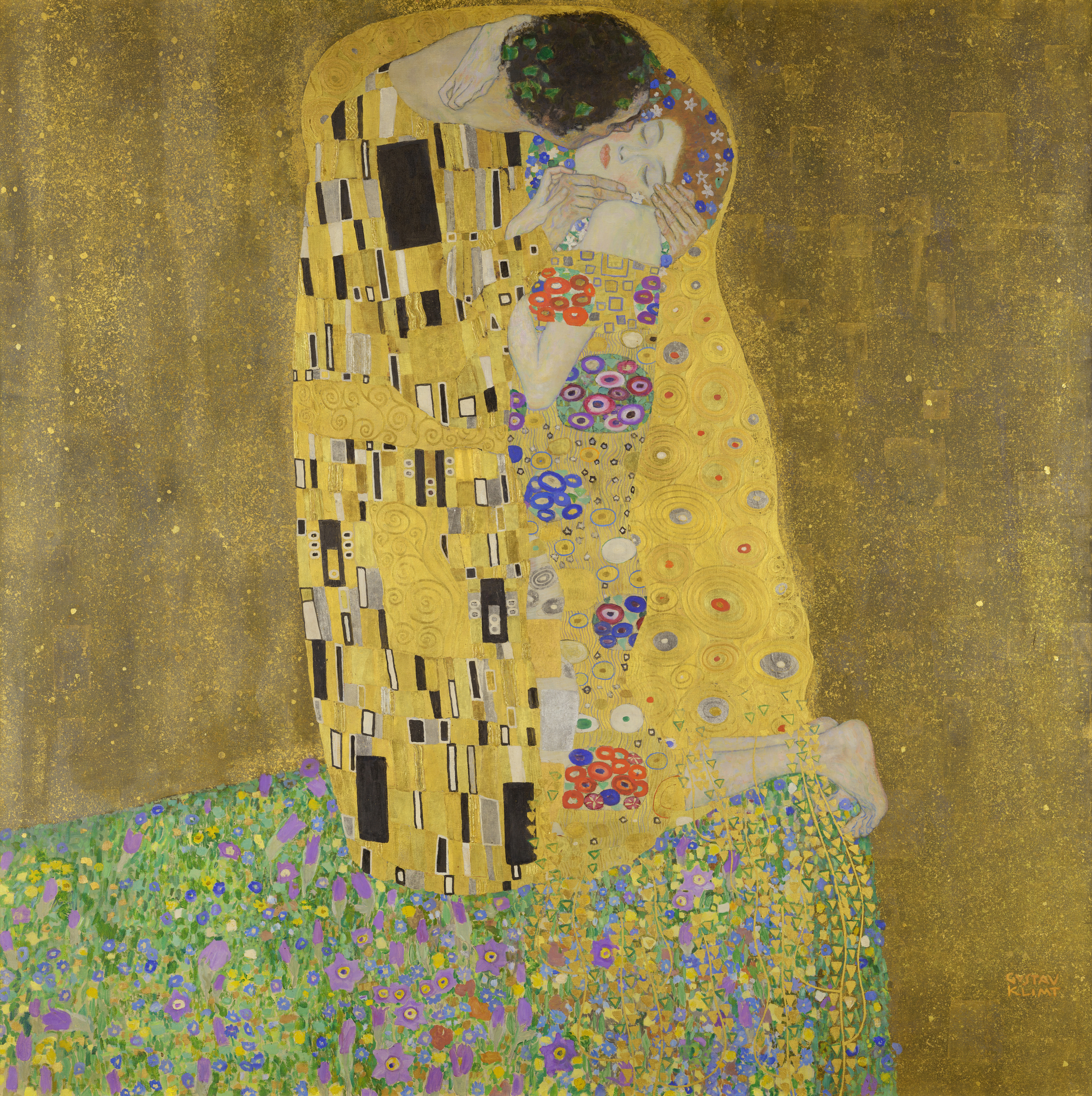
The Kiss by Gustav Klimt (1907–08)

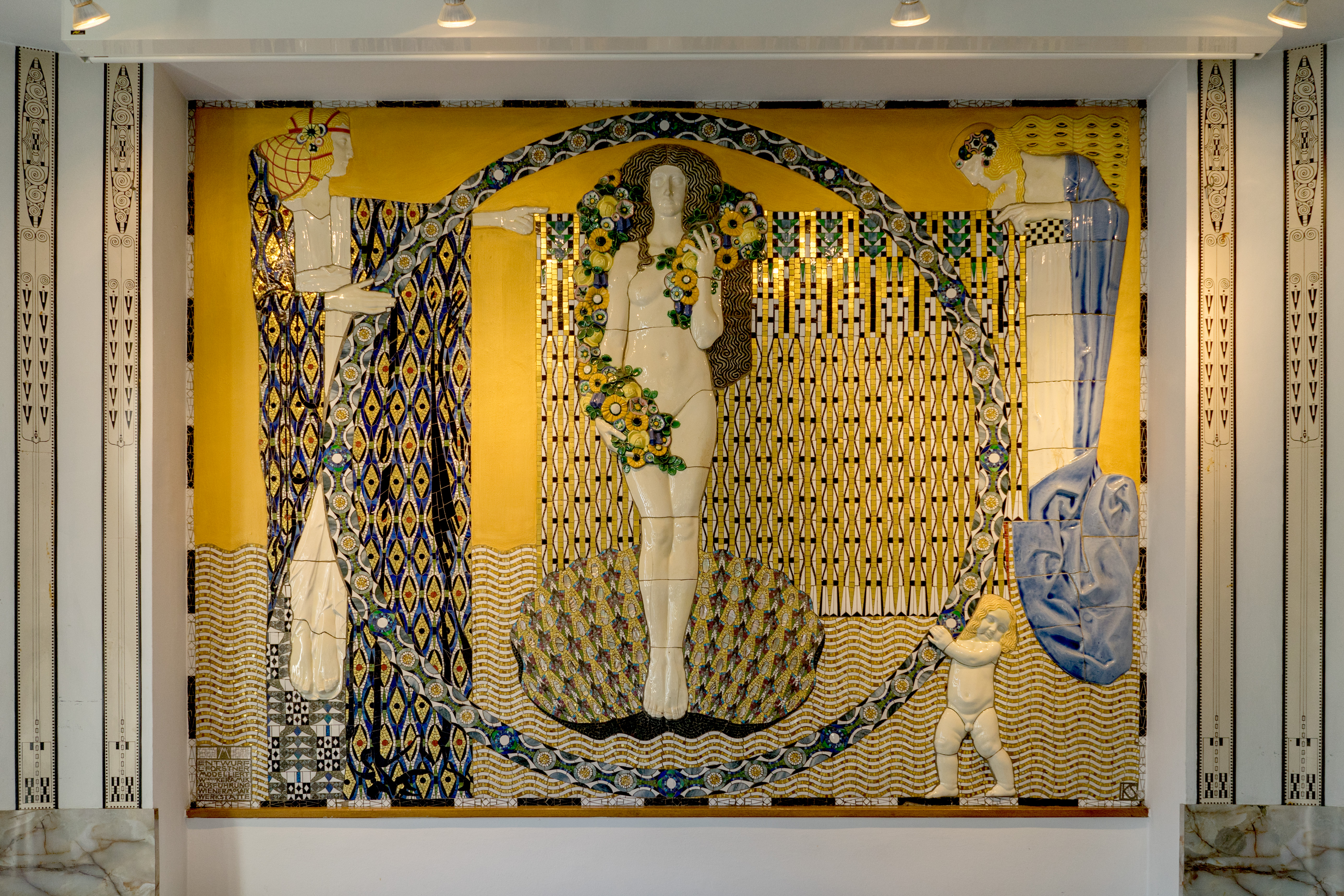
The Spring, glass mosaic by Leopold Forstner in the Hotel Wiesler, Graz

The most prominent architect of the Vienna Secession was Otto Wagner, he joined the movement soon after its inception to follow his students Hoffmann and Olbrich. His major projects included several stations of the urban rail network (the Stadtbahn), the Linke Wienzeile Buildings (consisting of Majolica House, the House of Medallions and the house at Köstlergasse). The Karlsplatz Station is now an exhibition hall of the Vienna Museum. The Kirche am Steinhof of Steinhof Psychiatric hospital (1904–1907) is a unique and finely crafted example of Secession religious architecture, with a traditional domed exterior but sleek, modern gold and white interior lit by abundance of modern stained glass.

In 1899 Joseph Maria Olbrich moved to Darmstadt Artists' Colony, in 1903 Koloman Moser and Josef Hoffmann founded the Wiener Werkstätte, a training school and workshop for designers and craftsmen of furniture, carpets, textiles and decorative objects. In 1905 Koloman Moser and Gustav Klimt separated from Vienna Secession, later in 1907 Koloman Moser left Wiener Werkstätte as well, while its other founder Josef Hoffmann joined the Deutscher Werkbund. Gustav Klimt and Josef Hoffmann continued collaborating, they organized the Kunstschau in 1908 in Vienna and built the Stoclet Palace in Brussels (1905–1911) that announced the coming of modernist architecture. It was designated as a World Heritage Site by UNESCO in June 2009.

==== Hungarian Szecesszió ====
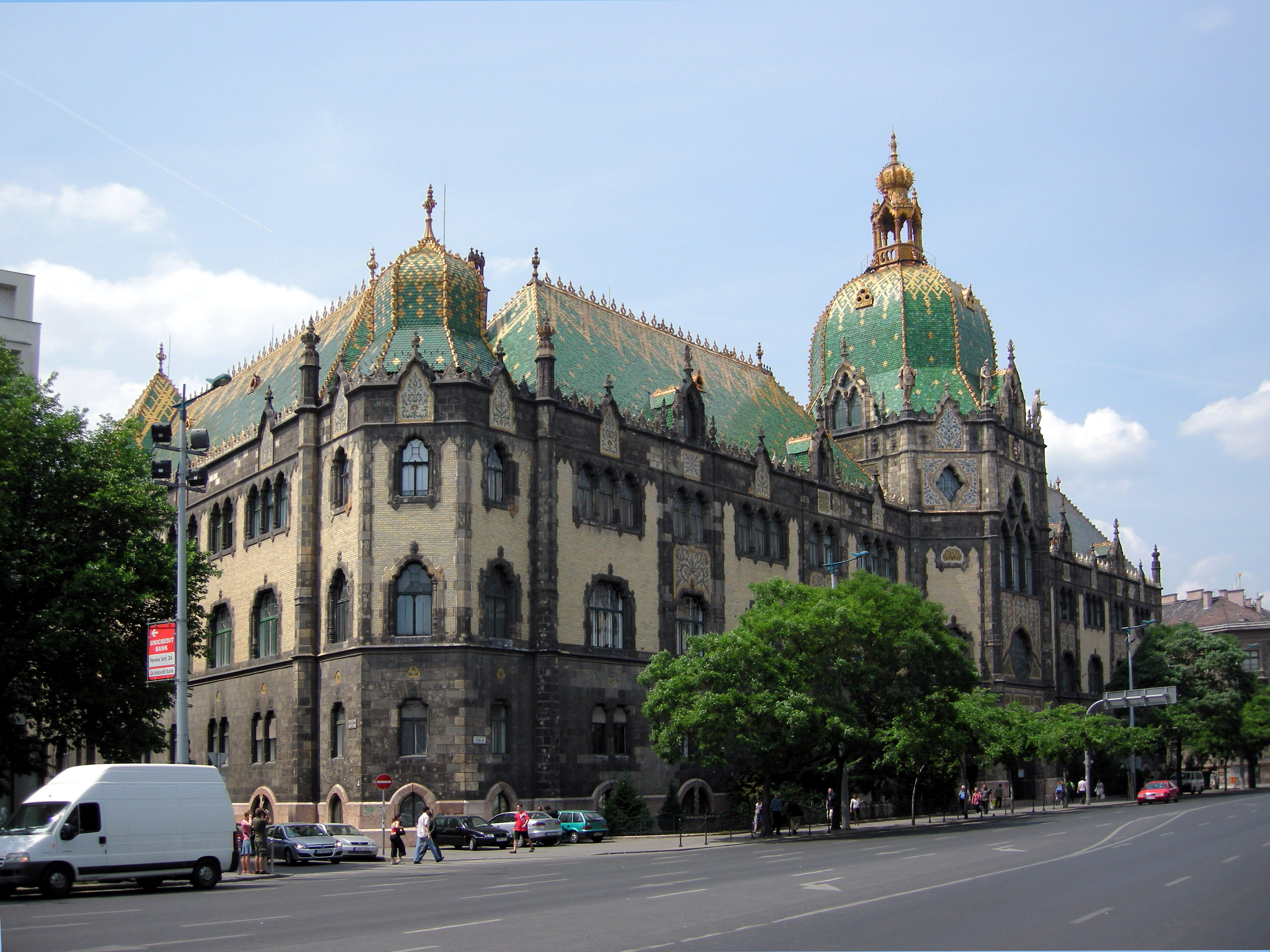
Museum of Applied Arts in Budapest by Ödön Lechner (1893–1896)

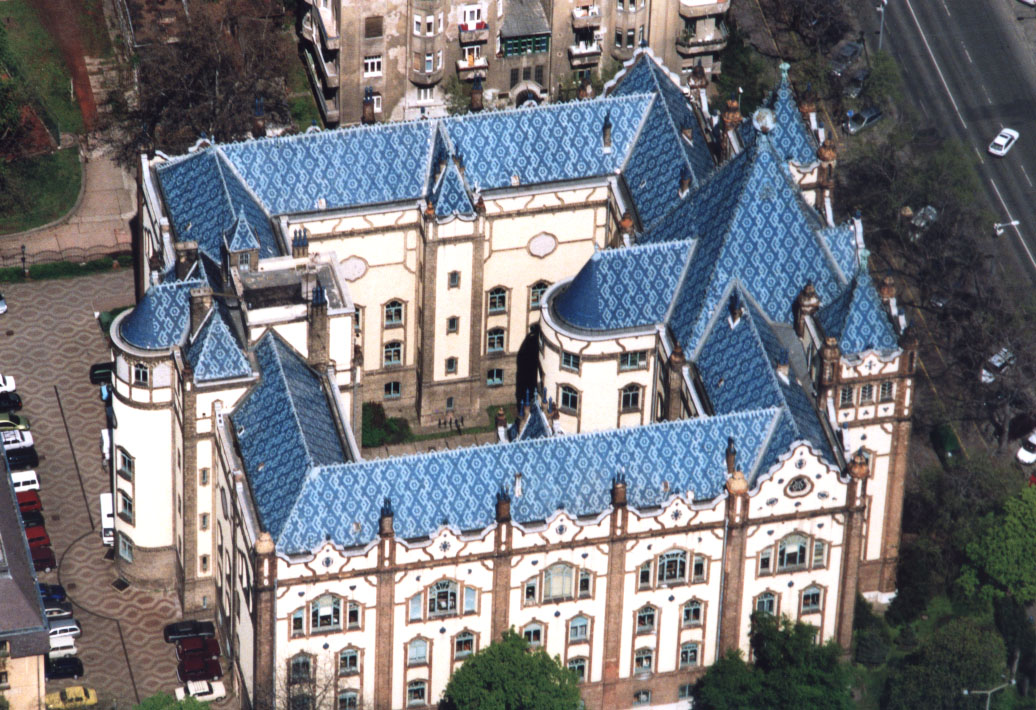
Geological Museum of Budapest by Lechner (1898–99)

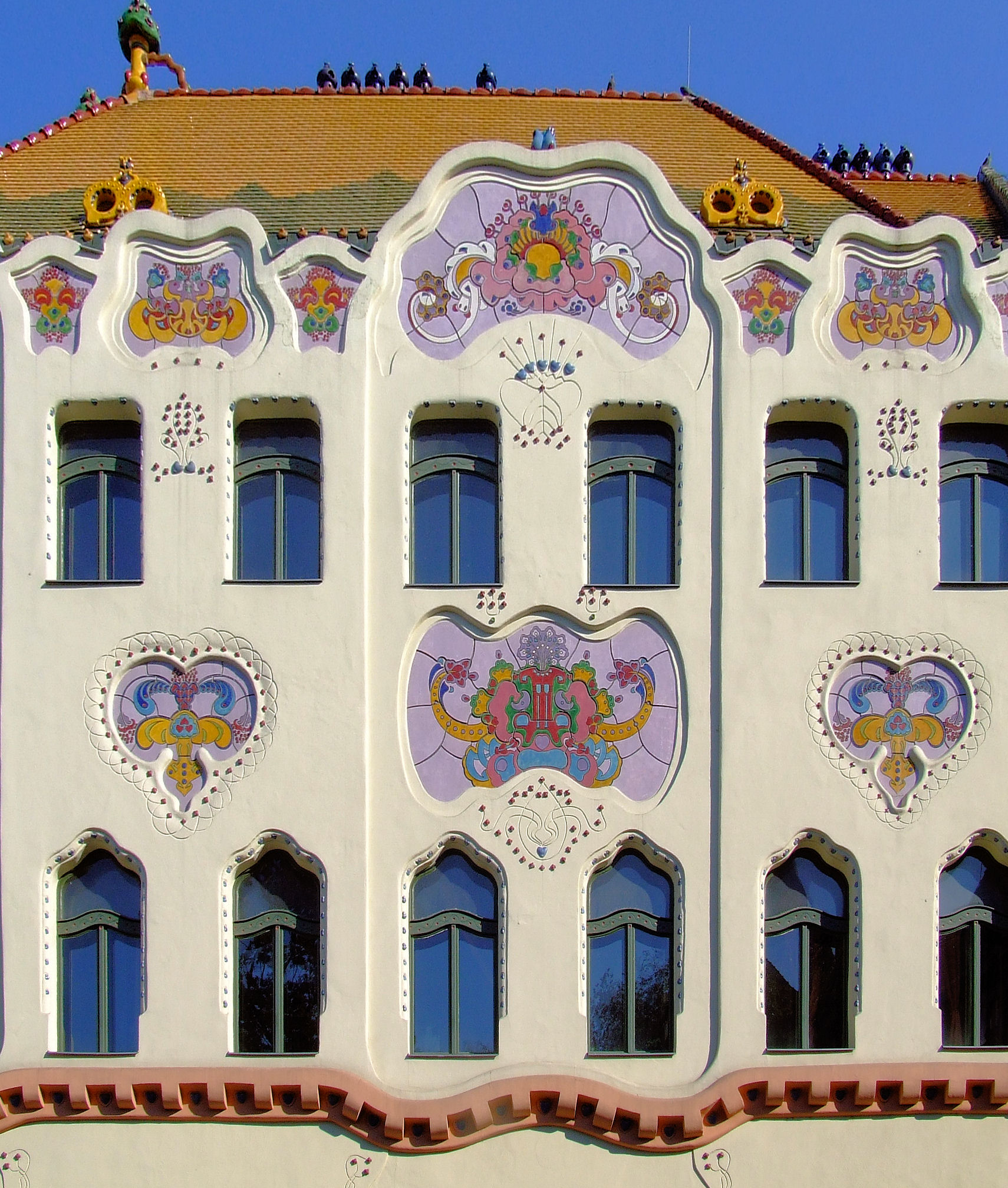
Façade detail of Cifrapalota in Kecskemét (1902)

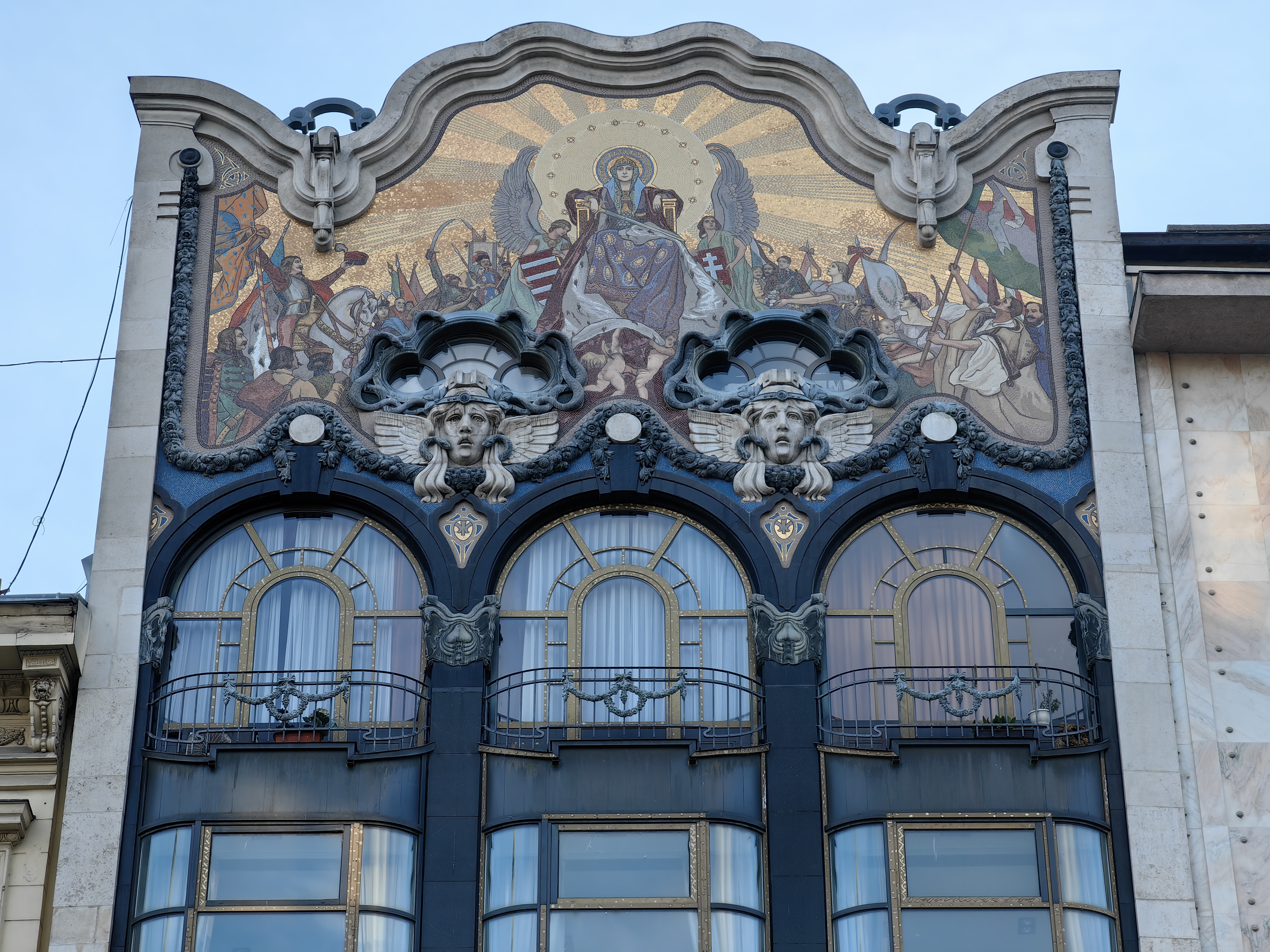
Mosaic on the façade of Török Bank building in Budapest by Miksa Róth (1906)

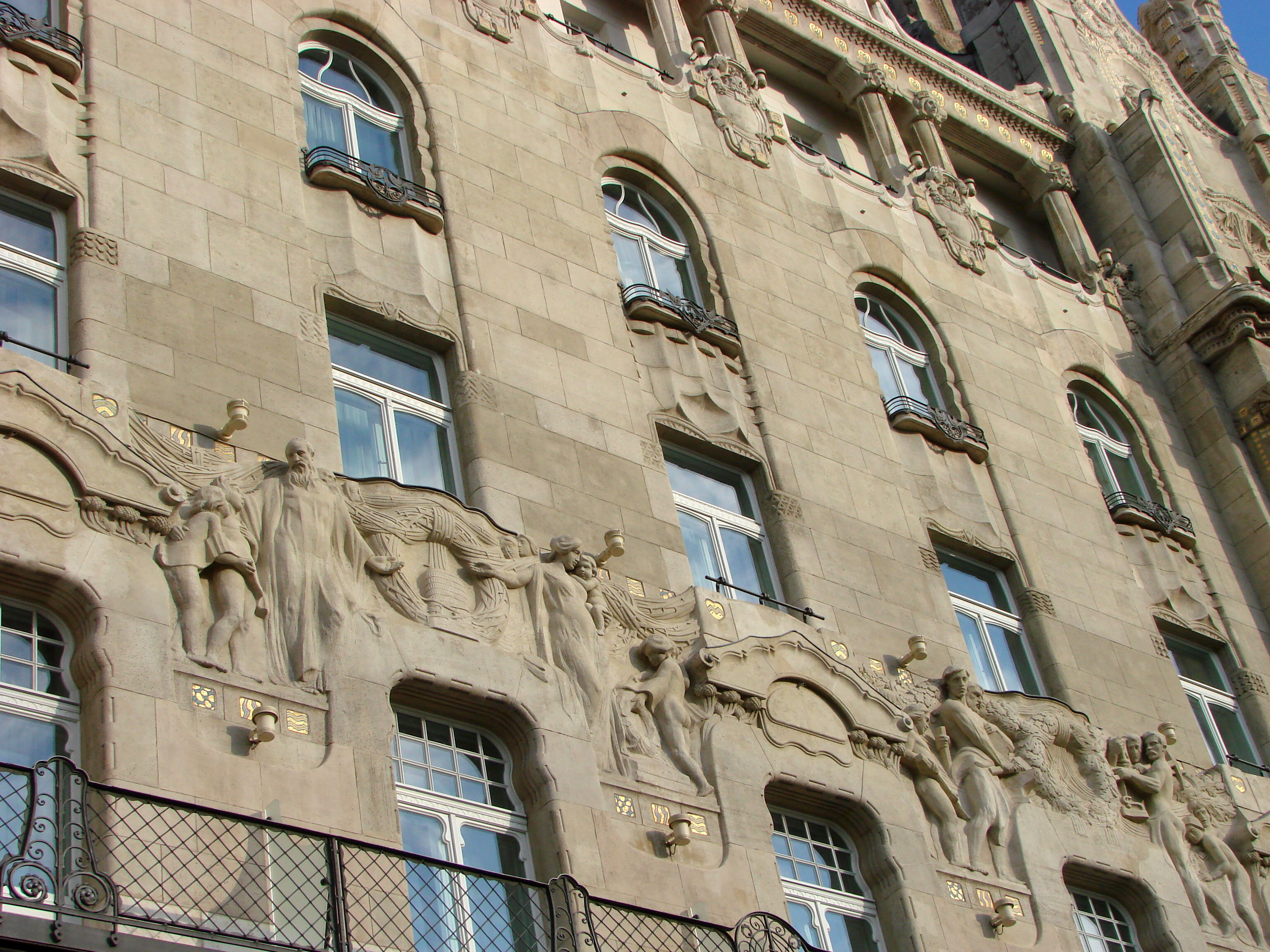
Relief on the façade of Gresham Palace in Budapest by Géza Maróti (1906)

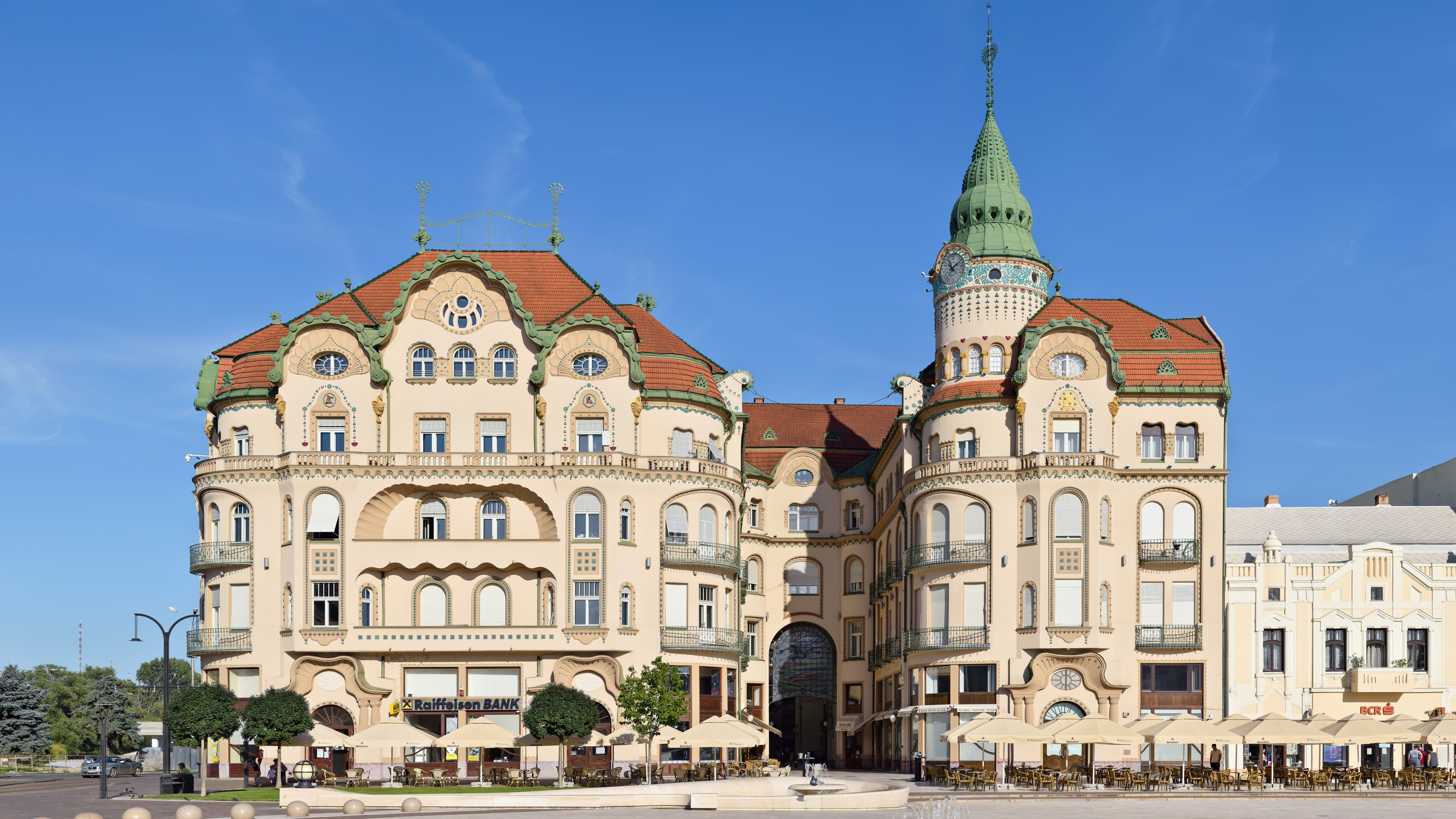
Black Eagle Palace in Oradea, today in Romania, at that time part of the Austro-Hungarian Empire, by Marcell Komor and Dezső Jakab (1907–08)

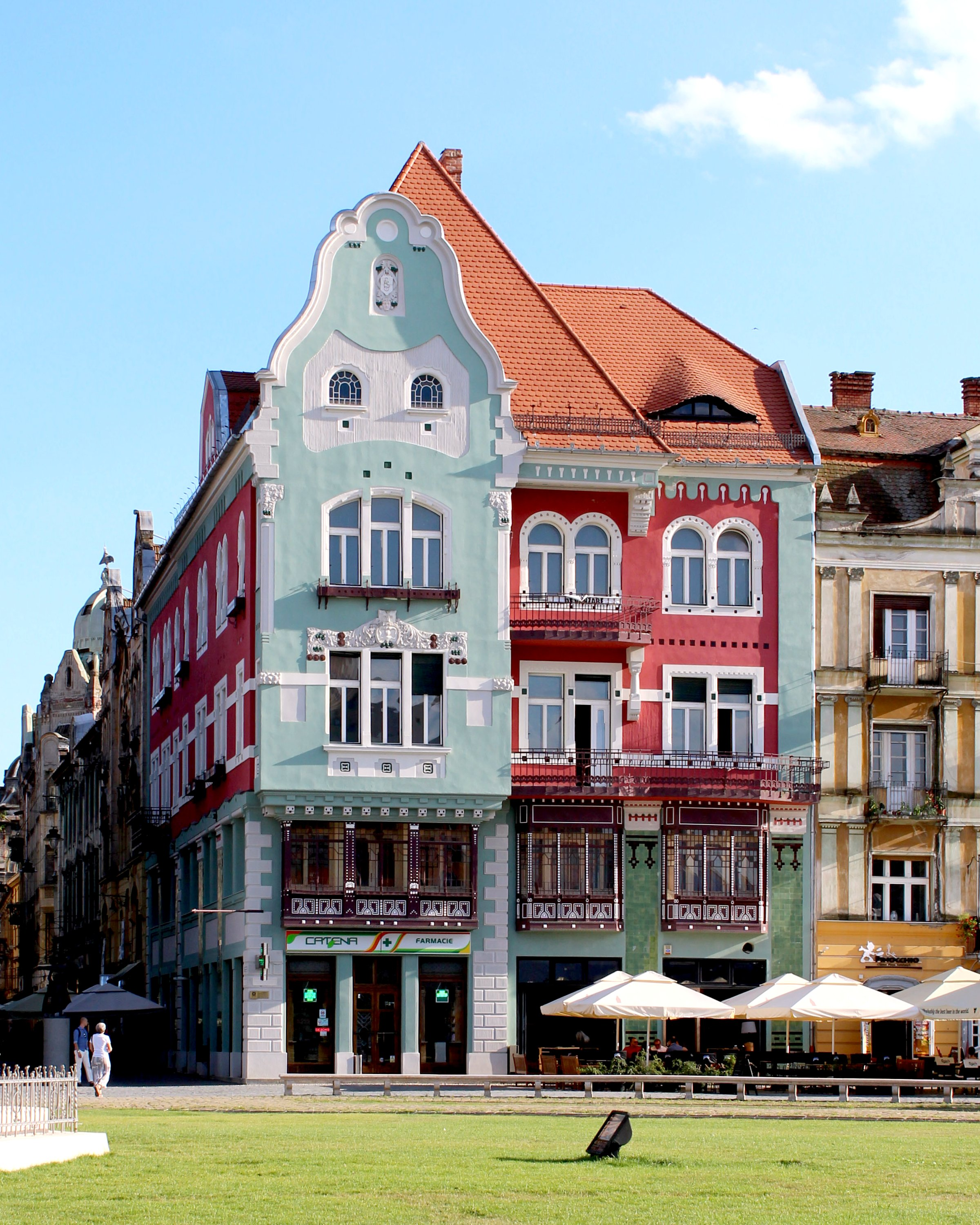
Brück House in Timișoara, today in Romania (1911). Along with Oradea, Timișoara is part of the Art Nouveau European Route

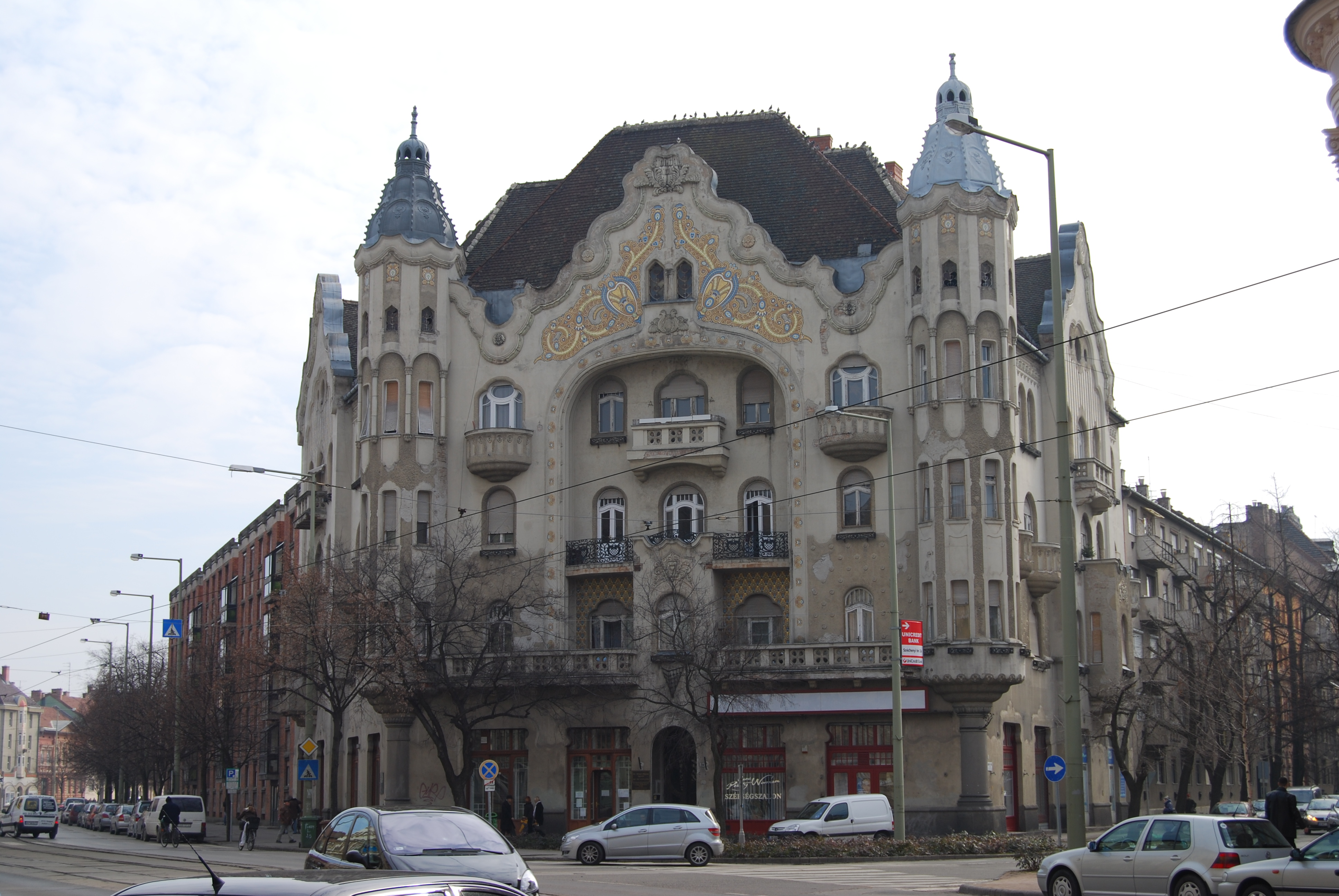
Gróf Palace in Szeged by Ferenc Raichle (1913)

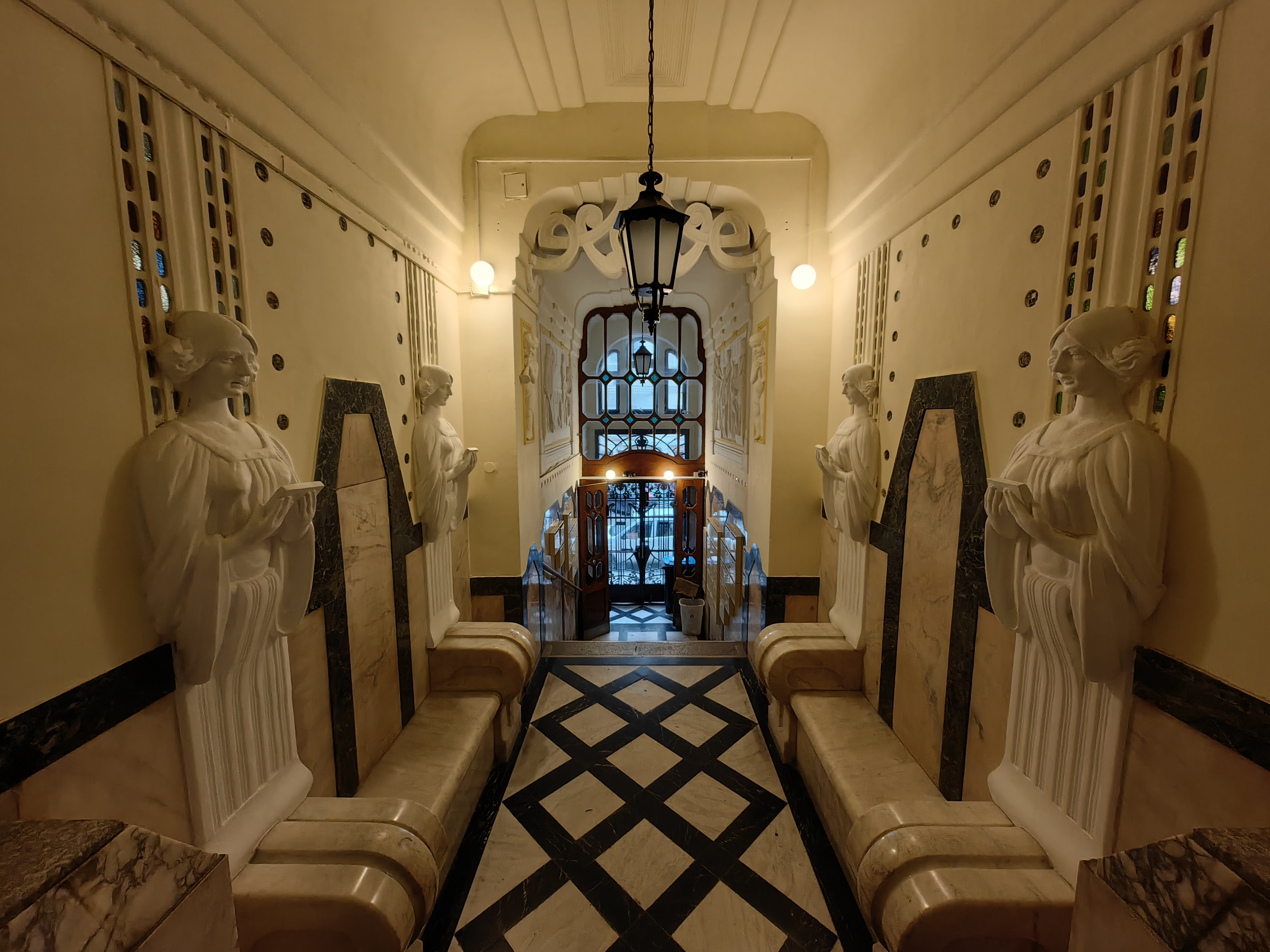
Spitzer house in Budapest

The pioneer and prophet of the Szecesszió ('Secession' in Hungarian), the architect Ödön Lechner, created buildings which marked a transition from historicism to modernism for Hungarian architecture. His idea for a Hungarian architectural style was the use of architectural ceramics and oriental motifs. In his works, he used pygorganite placed in production by 1886 by Zsolnay Porcelain Manufactory. This material was used in the construction of notable Hungarian buildings of other styles, e.g. the Hungarian Parliament Building and Matthias Church.

Works by Ödön Lechner include the Museum of Applied Arts (1893–1896), other building with similar distinctive features are Geological Museum (1896–1899) and The Postal Savings Bank building (1899–1902), all in Budapest. However, due to the opposition of Hungarian architectural establishment to Lechner's success, he soon was unable to get new commissions comparable to his earlier buildings. But Lechner was an inspiration and a master to the following generation of architects who played the main role in popularising the new style. Within the process of Magyarization numerous buildings were commissioned to his disciples in outskirts of the kingdom: e.g. Marcell Komor and Dezső Jakab were commissioned to build the Synagogue (1901–1903) and Town Hall (1908–1910) in Szabadka (now Subotica, Serbia), County Prefecture (1905–1907) and Palace of Culture (1911–1913) in Marosvásárhely (now Târgu Mureș, Romania). Later Lechner himself built the Blue Church in Pozsony (present-day Bratislava, Slovakia) in 1909–1913.

Another important architect was Károly Kós who was a follower of John Ruskin and William Morris. Kós took the Finnish National Romanticism movement as a model and the Transylvanian vernacular as the inspiration. His most notable buildings include the Roman Catholic Church in Zebegény (1908–09), pavilions for the Budapest Municipal Zoo (1909–1912) and the Székely National Museum in Sepsiszentgyörgy (now Sfântu Gheorghe, Romania, 1911–12).

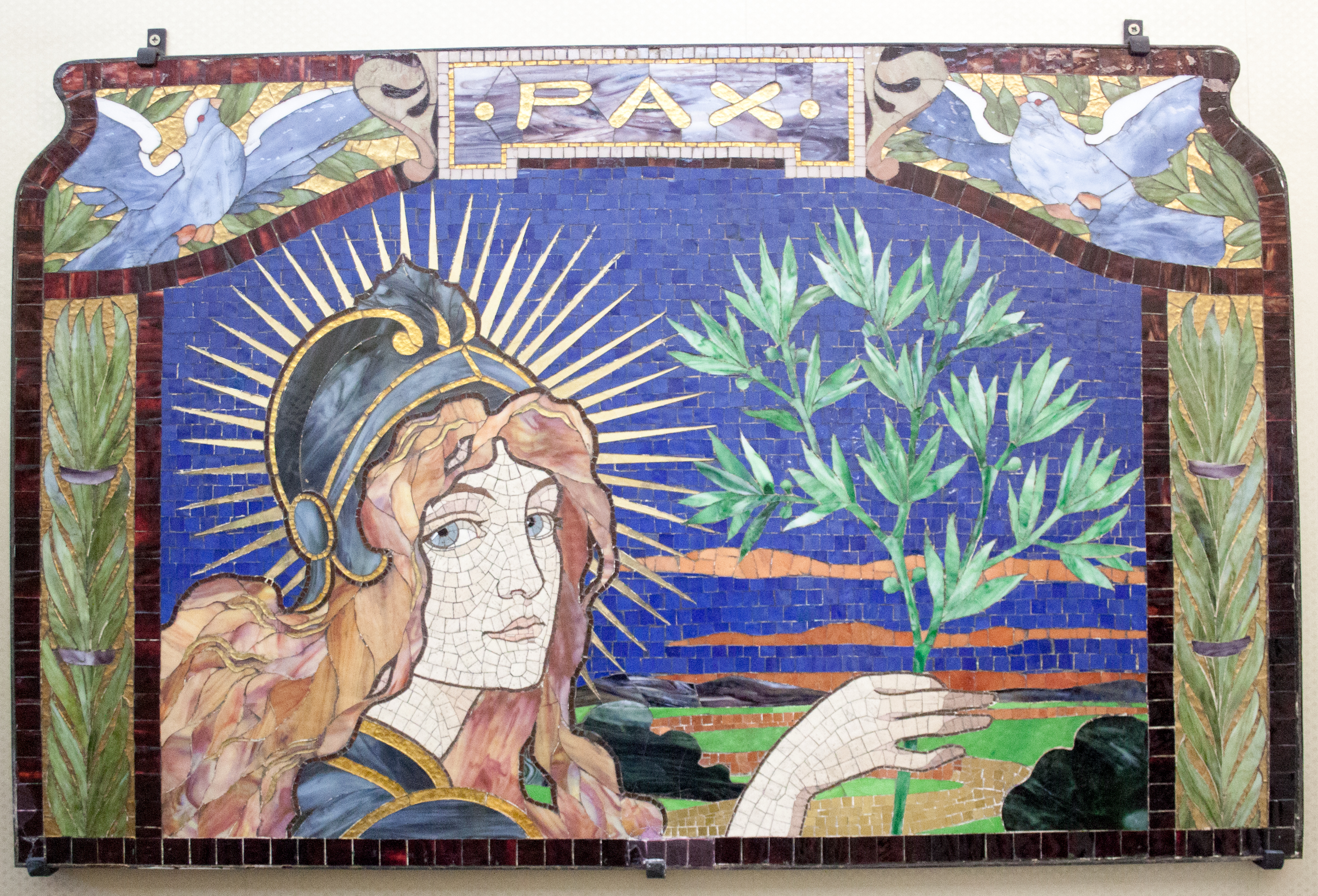
Pax, mosaic by Miksa Róth, which received the silver medal at the Paris World Exhibition in 1900

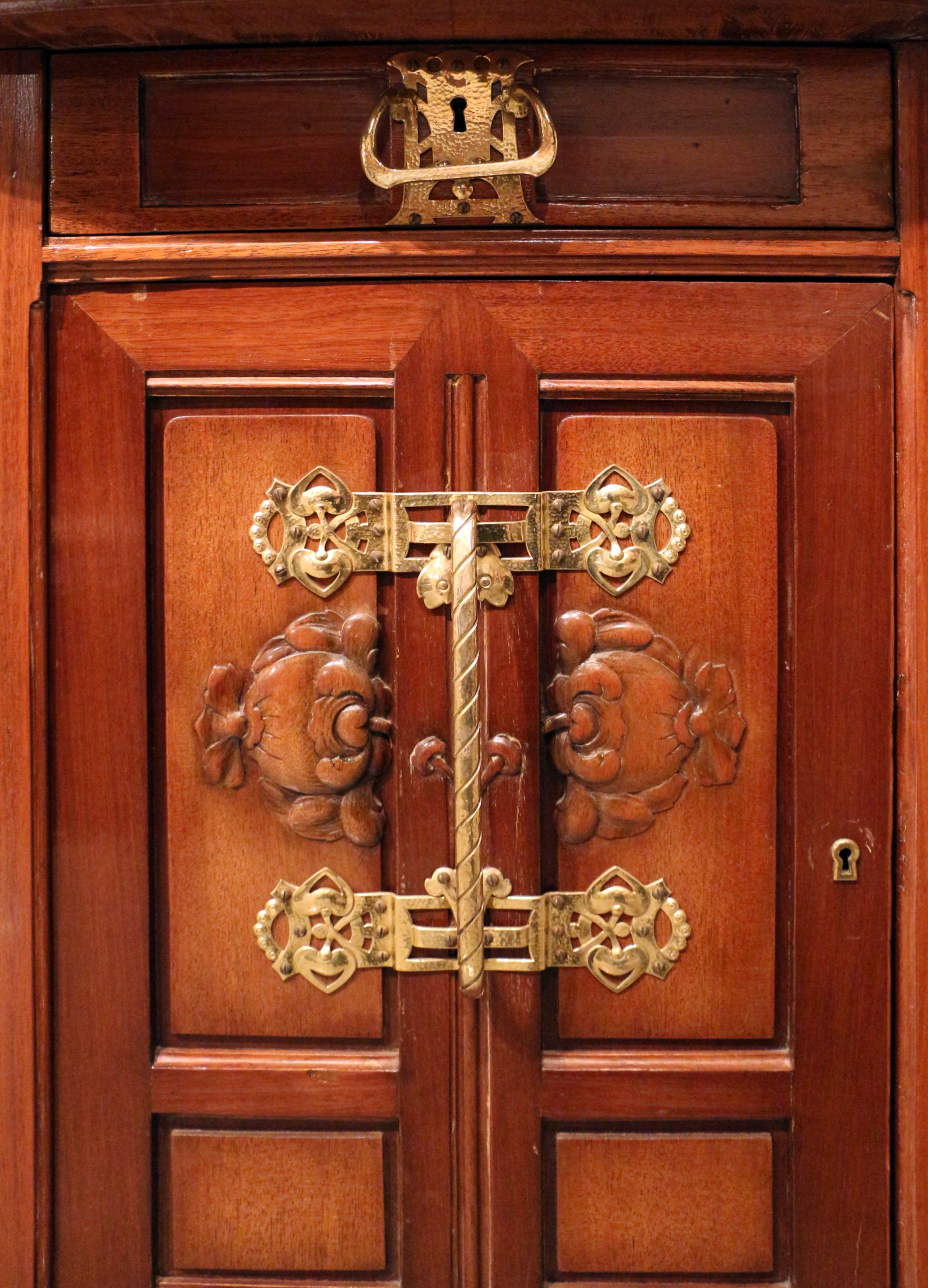
Cabinet by Ödön Faragó, from Budapest (1901)

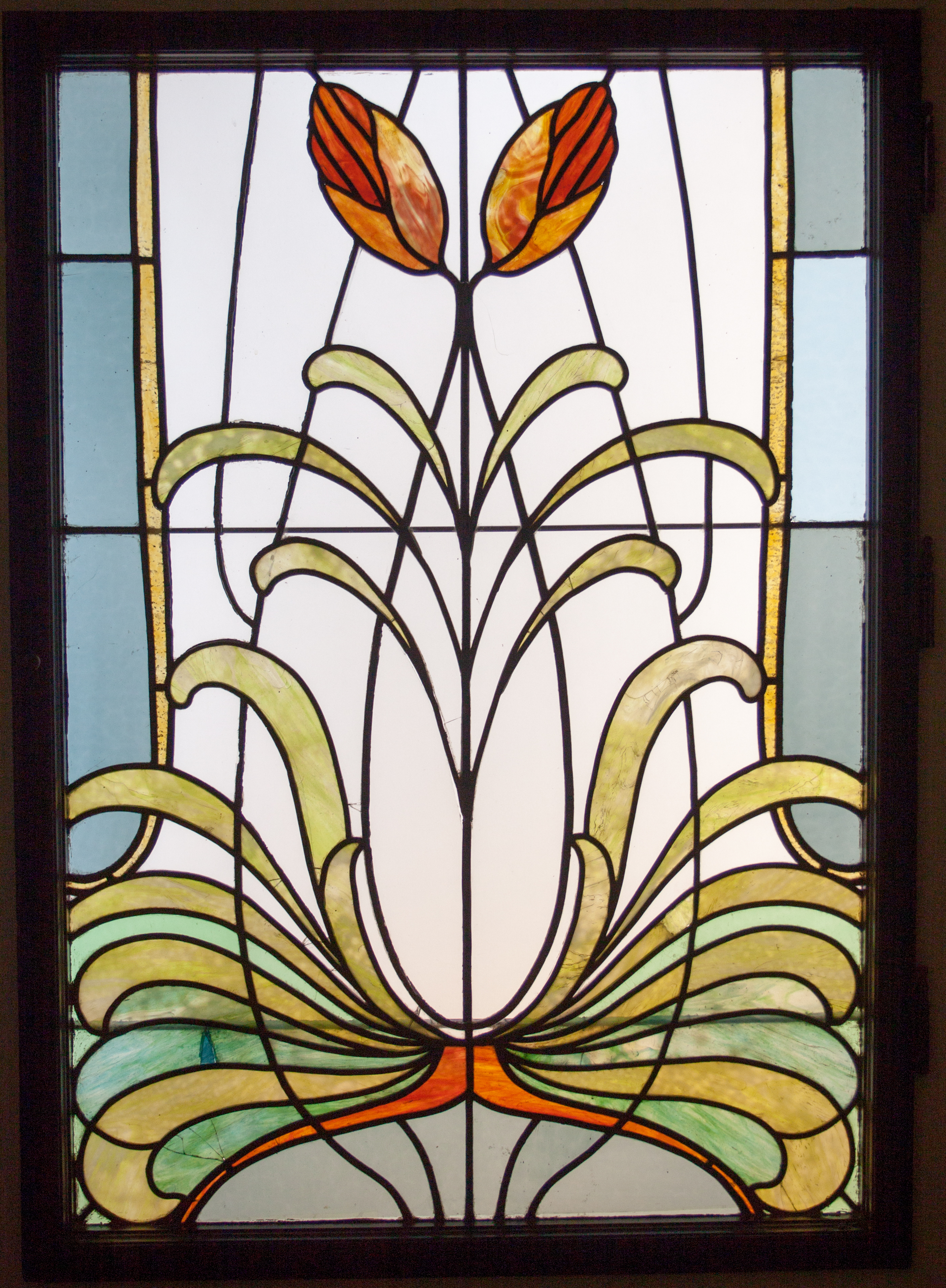
Window with flower motives from the Villa Alpár in Budapest, by Miksa Róth (1903)

The movement that promoted Szecesszió in arts was Gödöllő Art Colony, founded by Aladár Körösfői-Kriesch, also a follower John Ruskin and William Morris and a professor at the Royal School of Applied Arts in Budapest in 1901. Its artists took part in many projects, including the Franz Liszt Academy of Music in Budapest.

An associate to Gödöllő Art Colony, Miksa Róth was also involved in several dozen Szecesszió projects, including Budapest buildings including Gresham Palace (stained glass, 1906) and Török Bank (mosaics, 1906) and also created mosaics and stained glass for Palace of Culture (1911–1913) in Marosvásárhely.

A notable furniture designer is Ödön Faragó who combined traditional popular architecture, oriental architecture and international Art Nouveau in a highly picturesque style. Pál Horti, another Hungarian designer, had a much more sober and functional style, made of oak with delicate traceries of ebony and brass.

==== Secession in Bohemia, Moravia and Slovakia ====
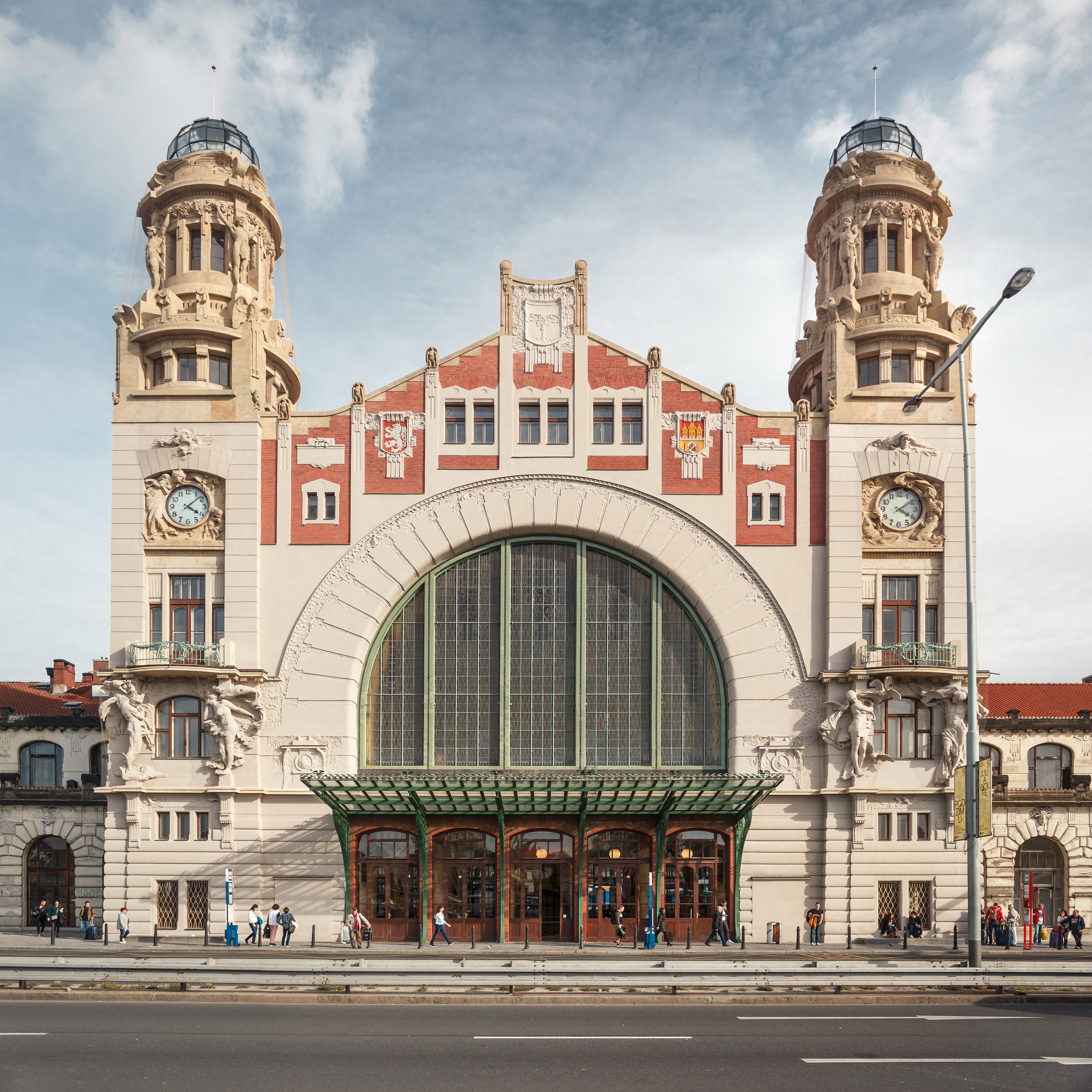
Praha hlavní nádraží railway station by Josef Fanta (1901–1909)

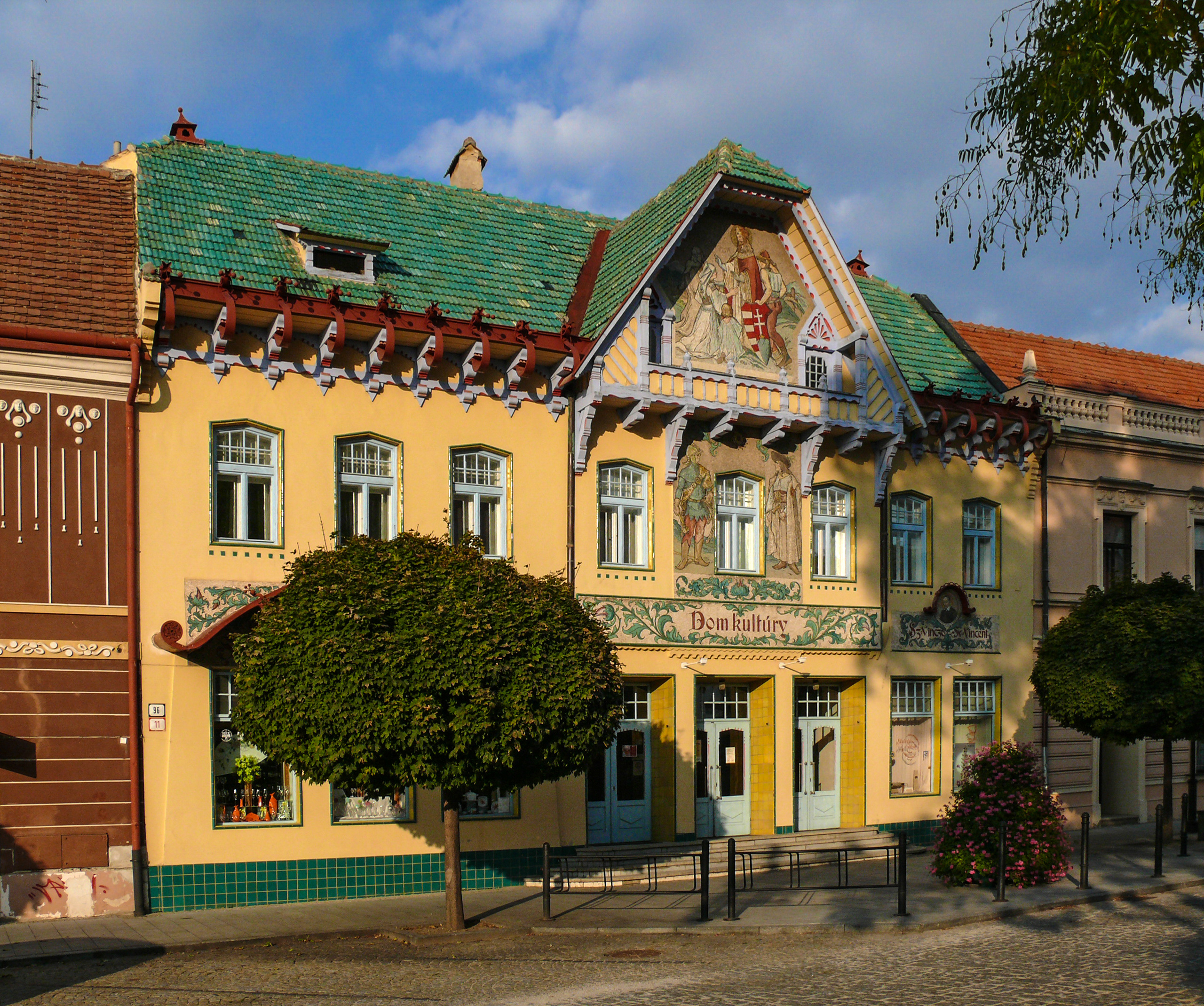
Cultural House in Skalica by Dušan Jurkovič (1905)

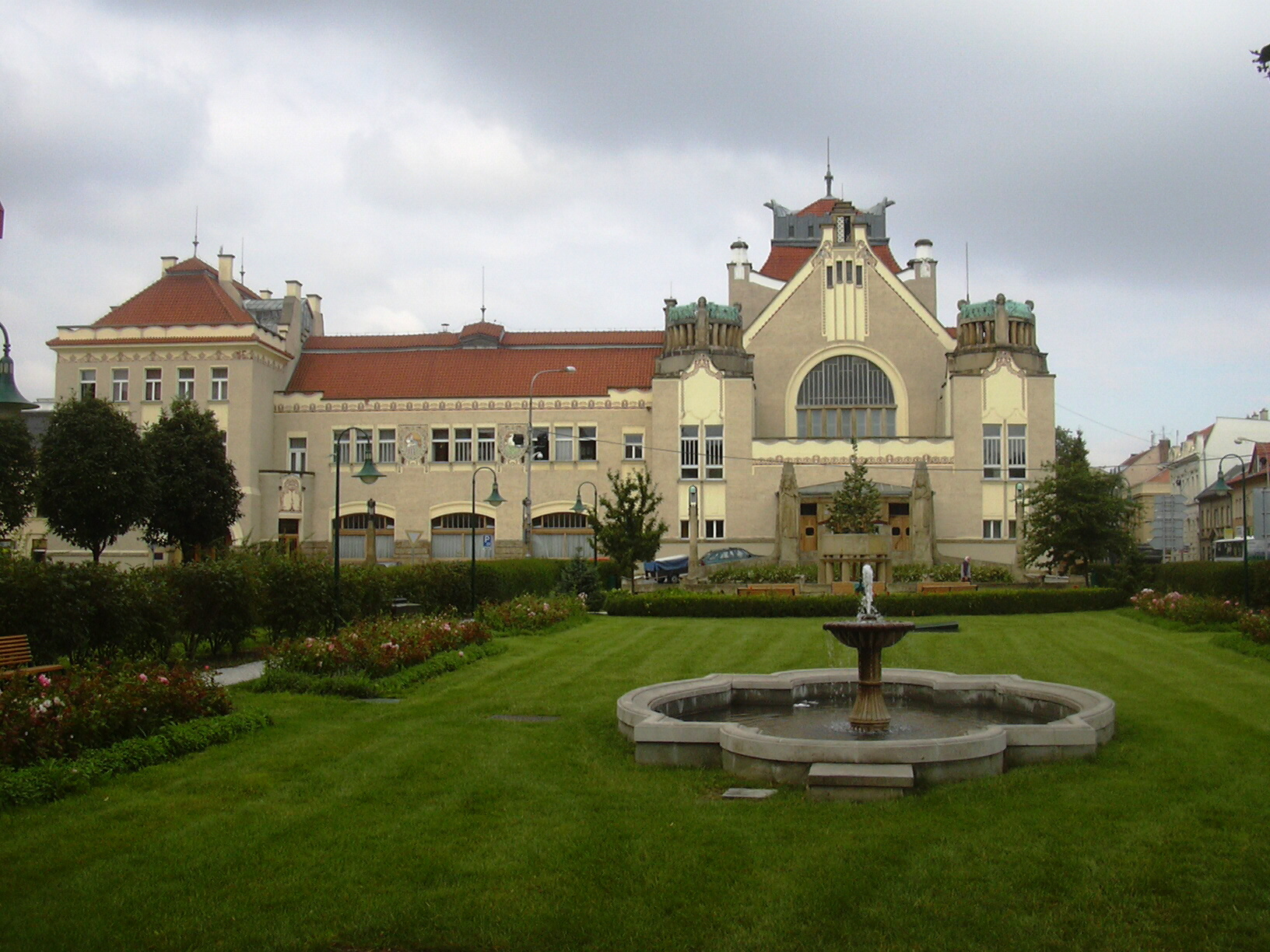
National House in Prostějov by Jan Kotěra (1905–1907)

Municipal House in Prague by Osvald Polívka and Antonín Balšánek (1905–1912)

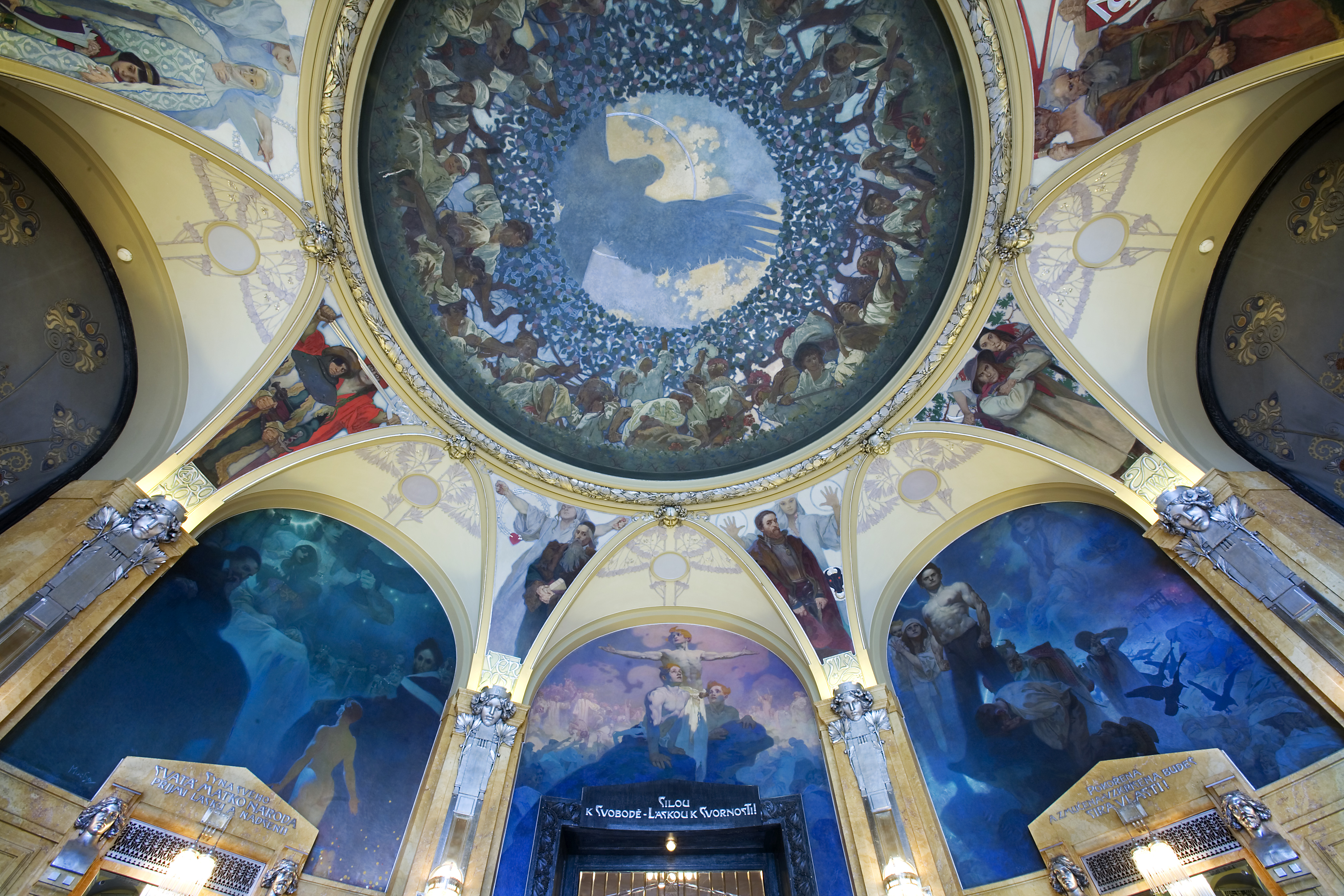
Frescoes of Municipal House by Alphonse Mucha

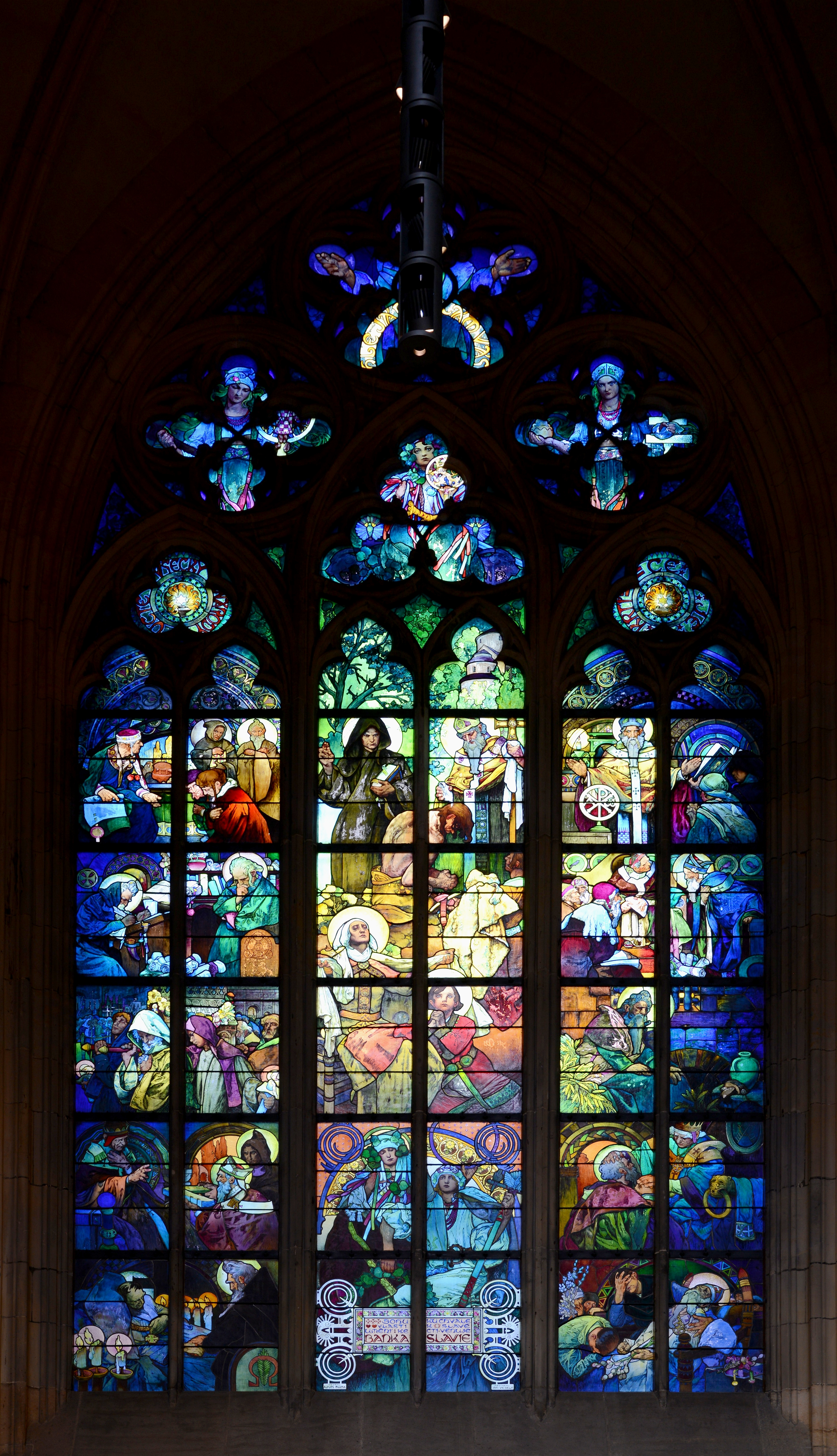
Stained glass window of St. Vitus Cathedral in Prague by Mucha

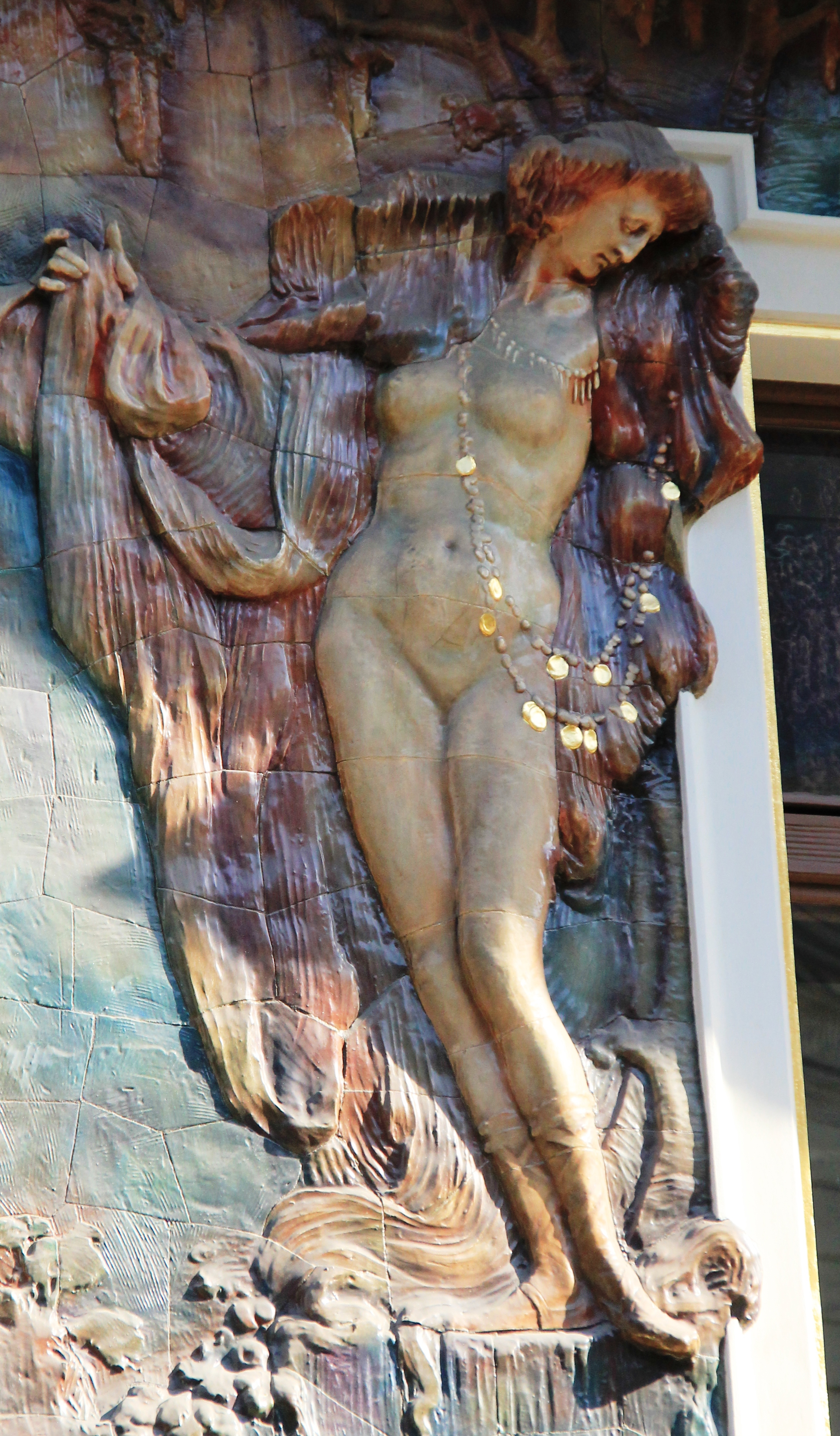
Ceramic relief of Viola Theater in Prague by Ladislav Šaloun

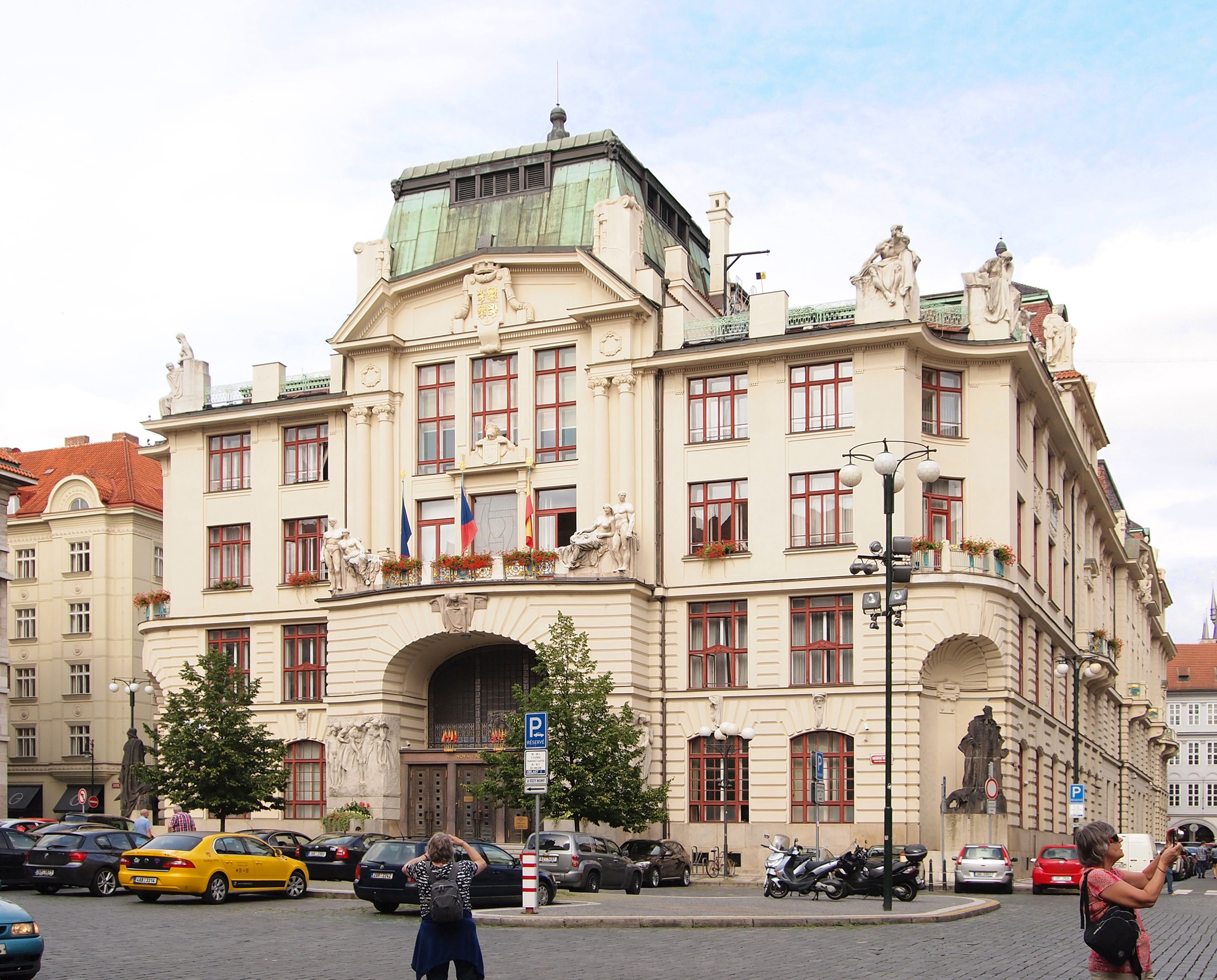
New City Hall of Prague by Polívka (1908–1911)

The most notable Secession buildings in Prague are examples of total art with distinctive architecture, sculpture and paintings. The main railway station (1901–1909) was designed by Josef Fanta and features paintings of Václav Jansa and sculptures of Ladislav Šaloun and Stanislav Sucharda along with other artists. The Municipal House (1904–1912) was designed by Osvald Polívka and Antonín Balšánek, painted by the Czech painter Alphonse Mucha and features sculptures of Josef Mařatka and Ladislav Šaloun. Polívka, Mařatka, and Šaloun simultaneously cooperated in the construction of New City Hall (1908–1911) along with Stanislav Sucharda, and Mucha later painted St. Vitus Cathedral's stained glass windows in his distinctive style.

The most important Czech architect of this period was Jan Kotěra, who studied in Vienna under Otto Wagner. His best-known works are the Peterka House at 12 Wenceslas Square in Prague (1899–1900), the National House in Prostějov (1905–1907) and the Museum of Eastern Bohemia in Hradec Králové (1909–1912). Many important Vienesse architects were born in Moravia or Austrian Silesia, like Josef Hoffmann, Hubert Gessner, Joseph Maria Olbrich and Leopold Bauer.

The style of combining Hungarian Szecesszió and national architectural elements was typical for a Slovak architect Dušan Jurkovič. His most original works are the Cultural House in Szakolca (now Skalica in Slovakia, 1905), the buildings of spa in Luhačovice (now Czech Republic) in 1901–1903 and 35 war cemeteries near Nowy Żmigród in Galicia (now Poland), most of them heavily influenced by local Lemko (Rusyn) folk art and carpentry (1915–1917).

==== Secession in Galicia ====
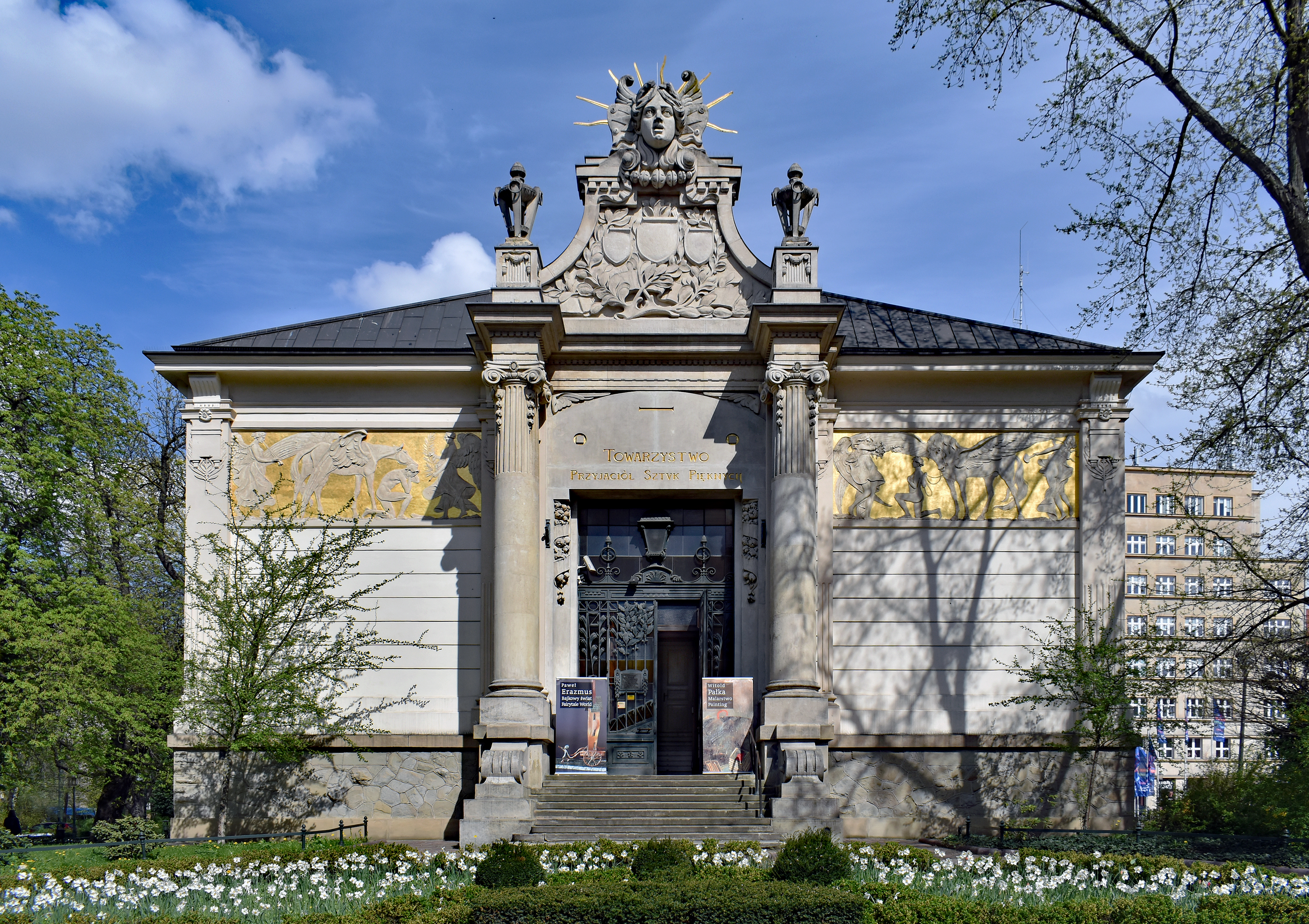
Palace of Art in Kraków by Franciszek Mączyński (1898–1901) – southern façade

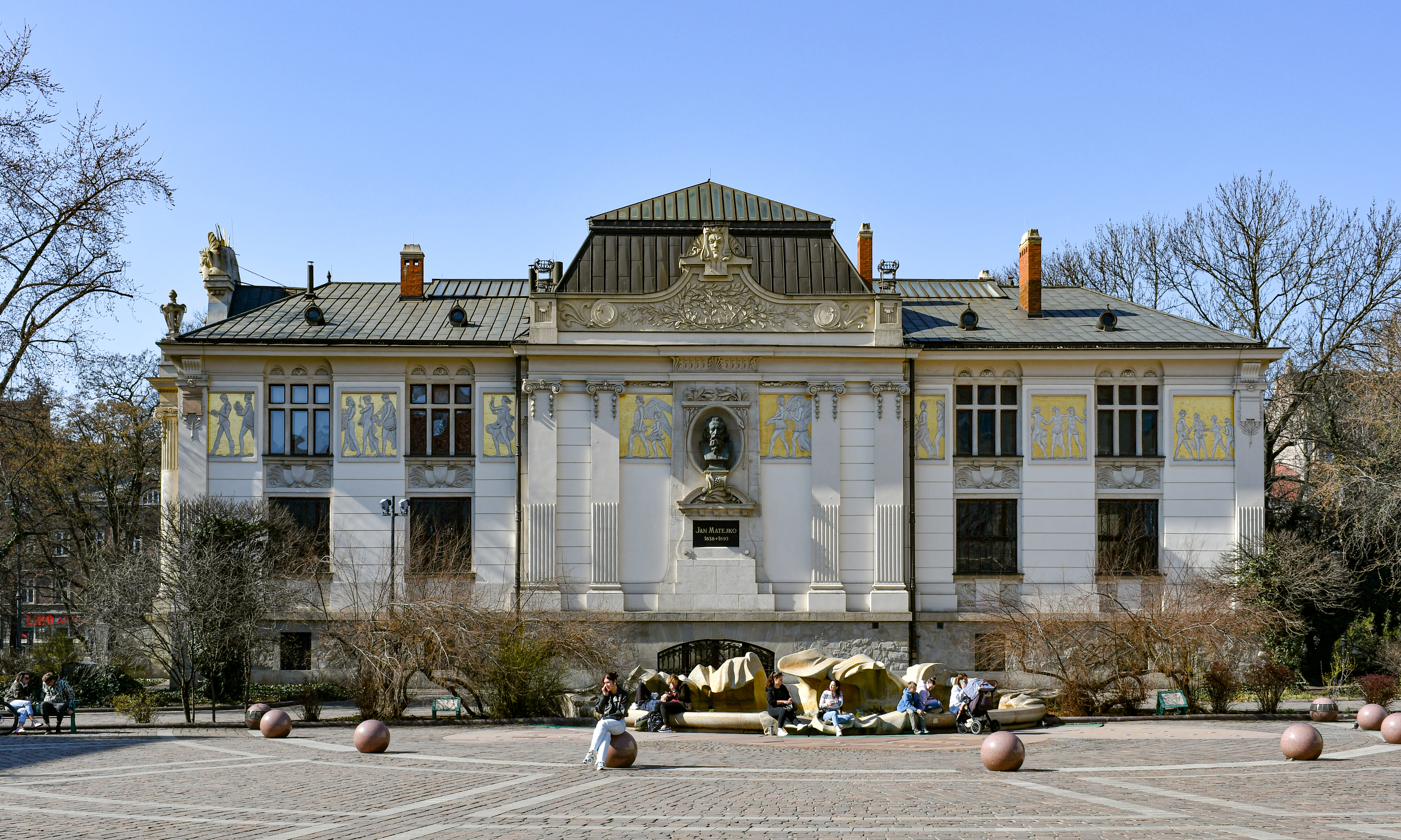
Palace of Art in Kraków by Mączyński (1898–1901)
eastern façade

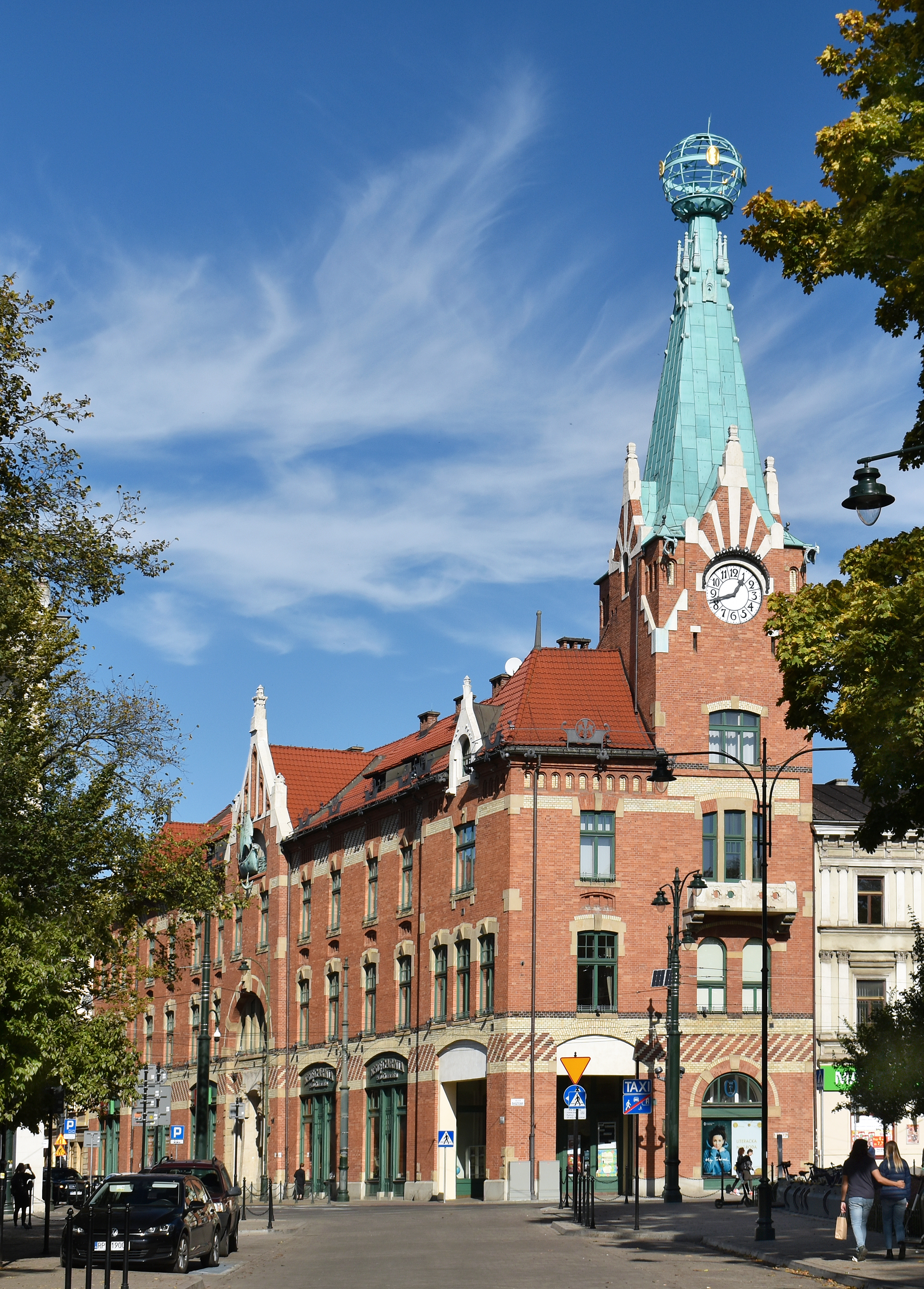
House Under the Globe in Kraków by Mączyński and Tadeusz Stryjeński (1904–05)

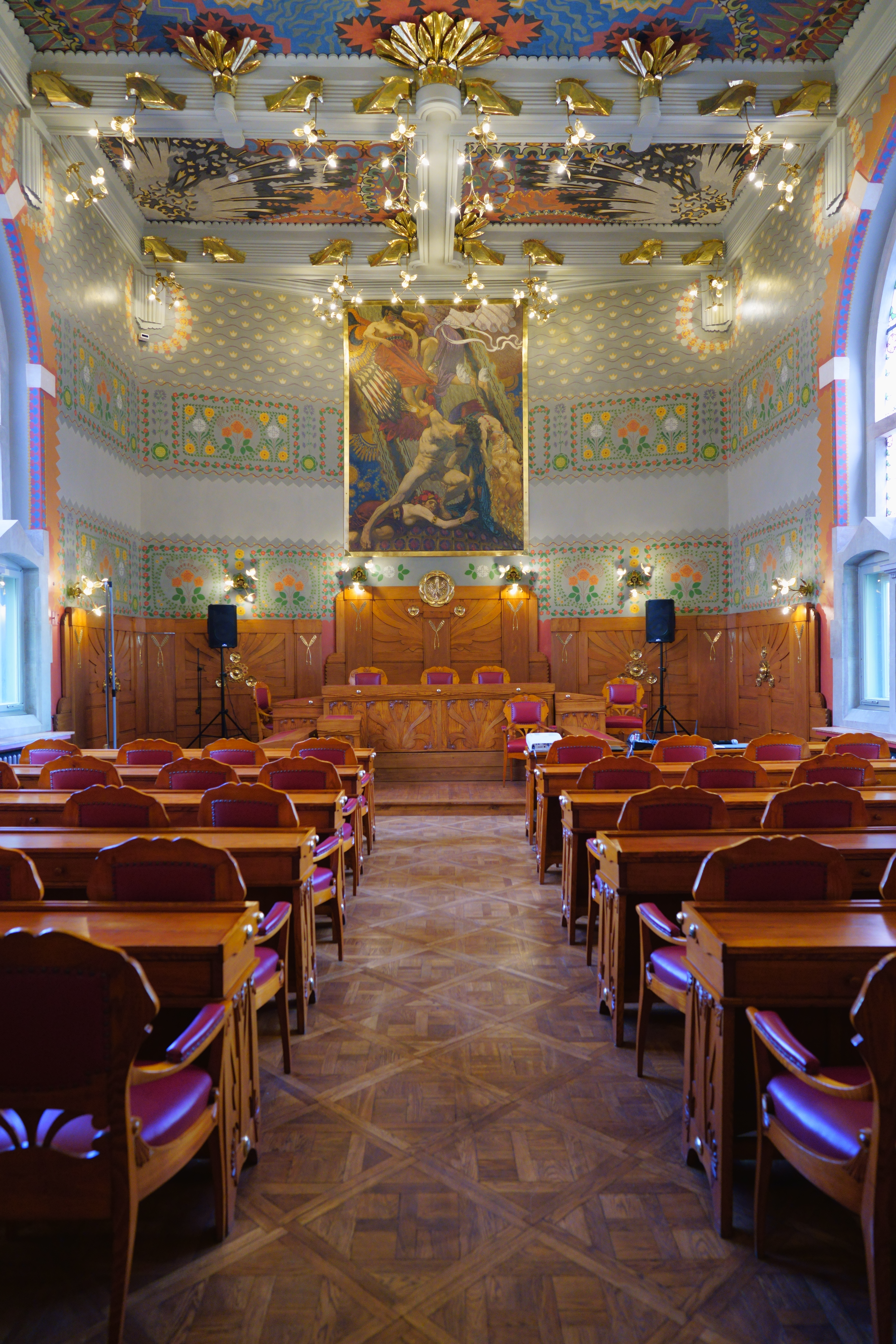
Interior of the House Under the Globe in Kraków by Józef Mehoffer

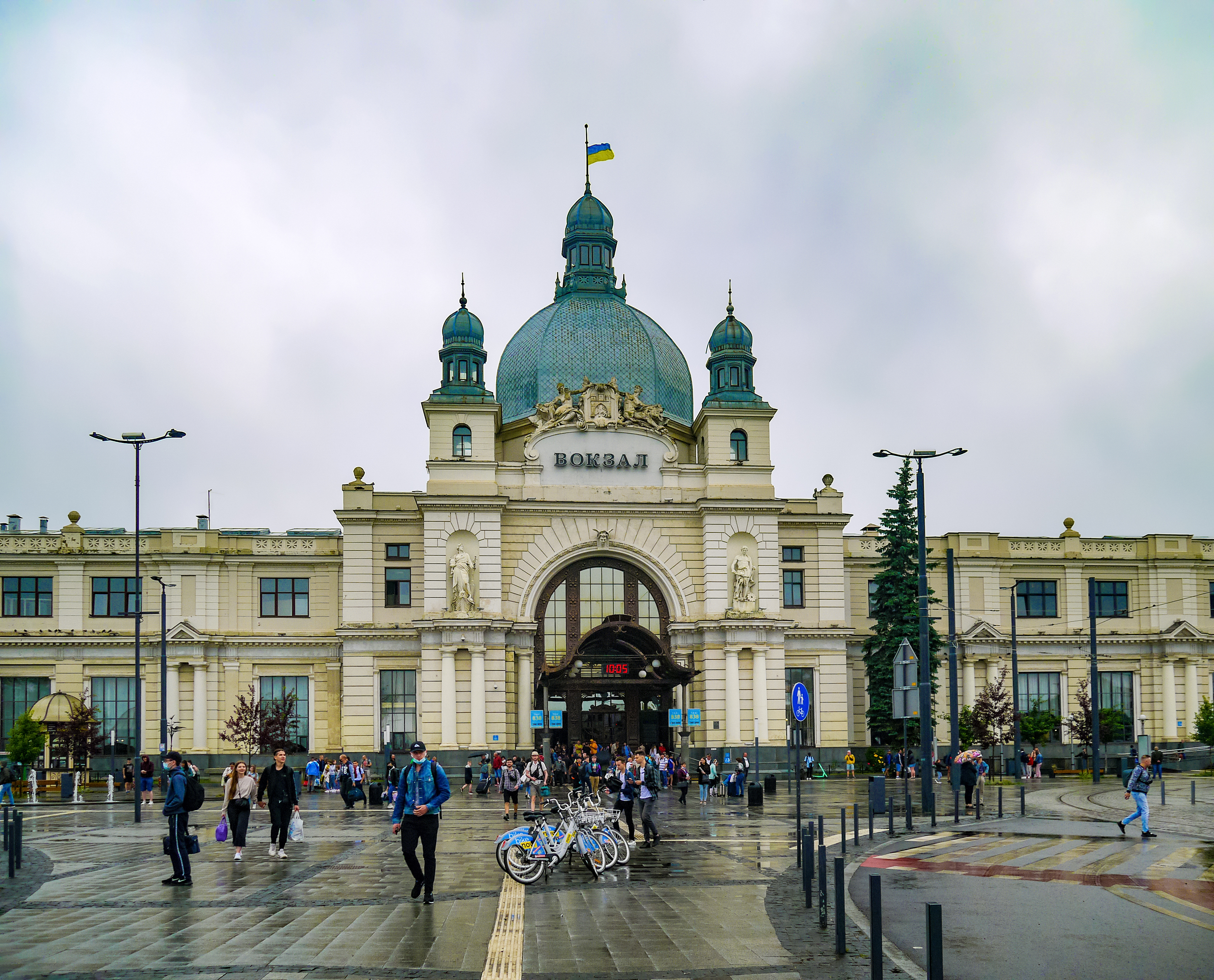
Lviv railway station by Władysław Sadłowski (1899–1904)

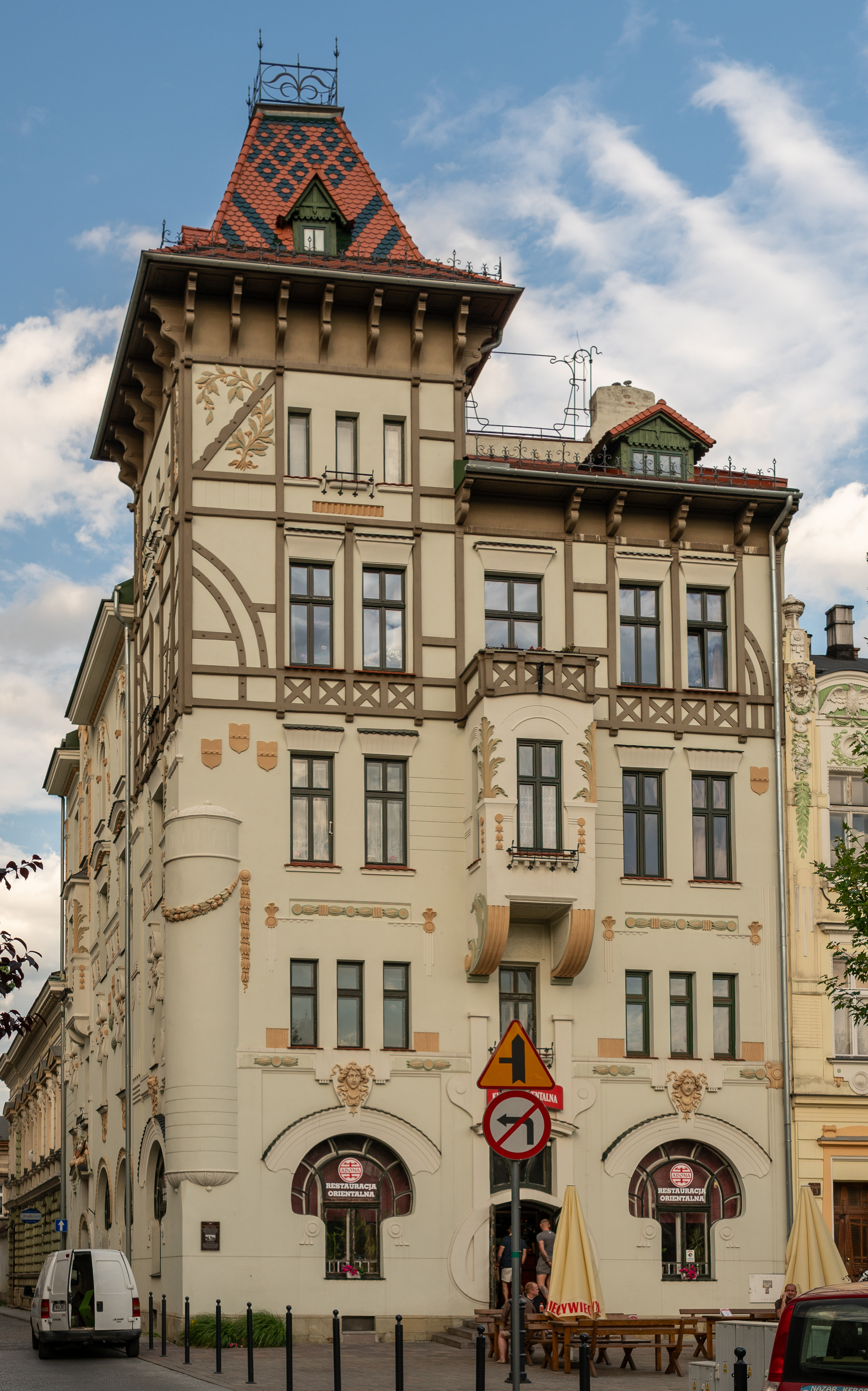
Frog House in Bielsko-Biała by Emanuel Rost (1903)

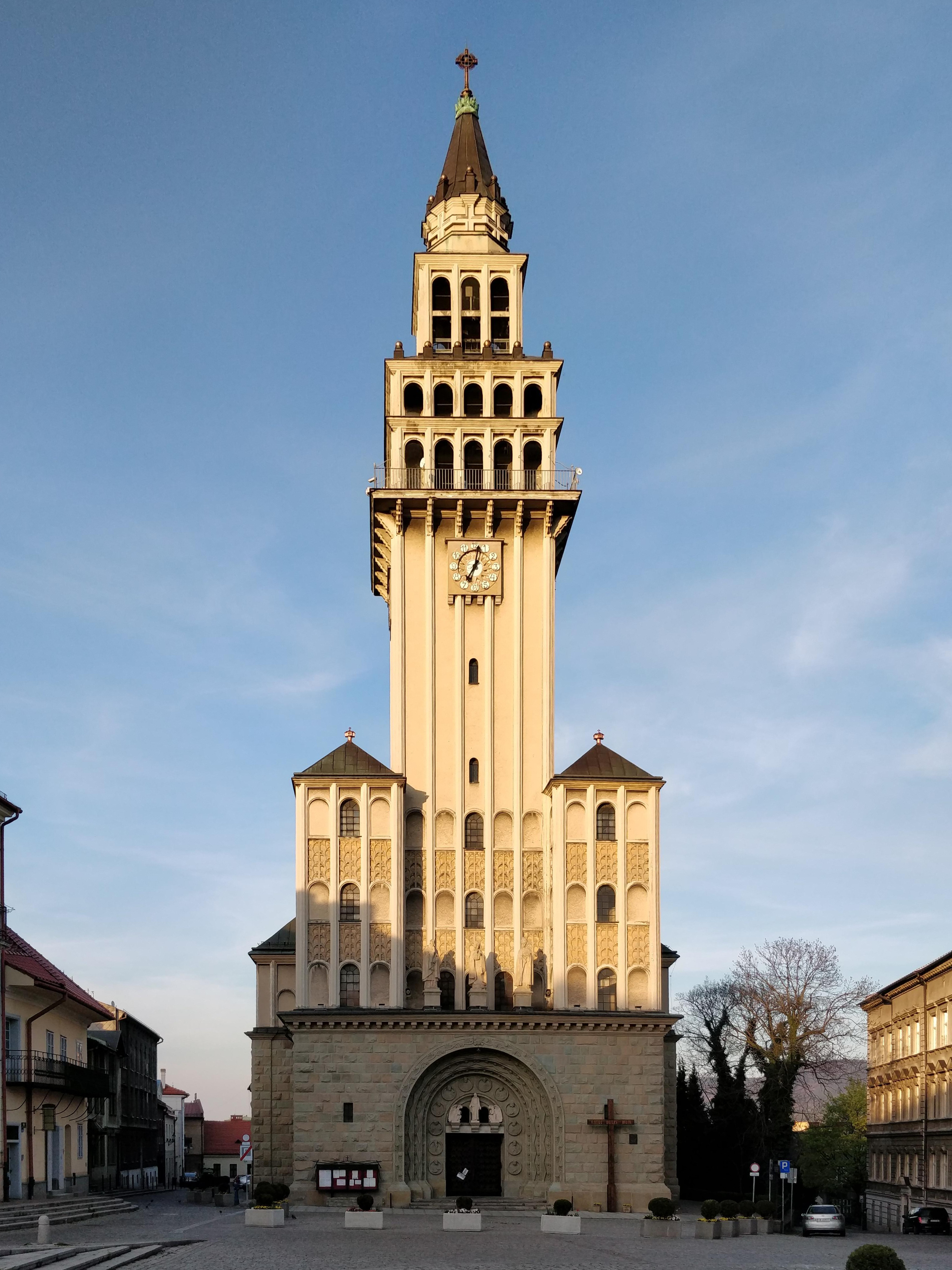
Saint Nicholas' Cathedral in Bielsko-Biała by Leopold Bauer (1909–10)
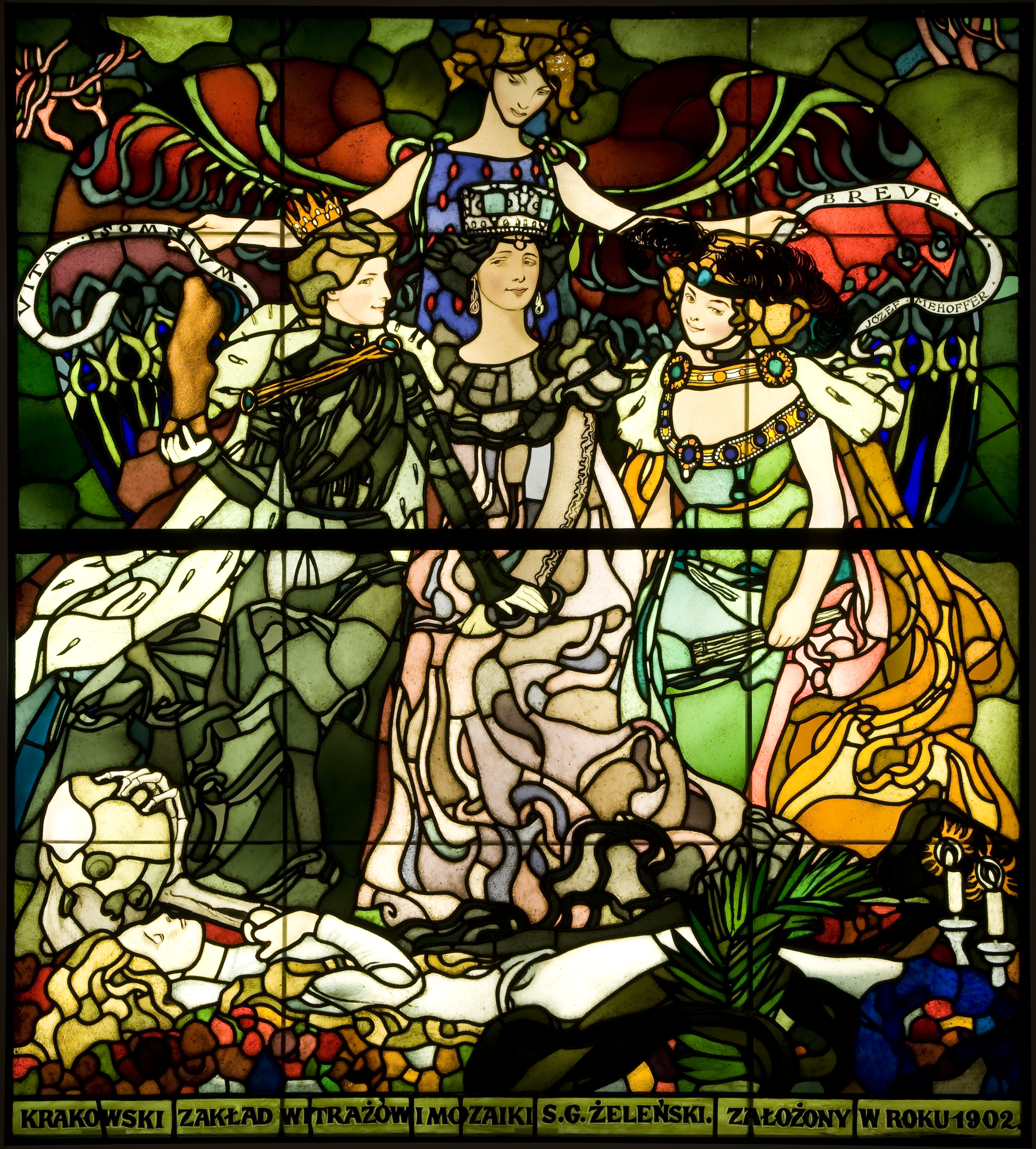
Vita somnium breve, stained glass by Mehoffer (1895), in the National Museum in Kraków

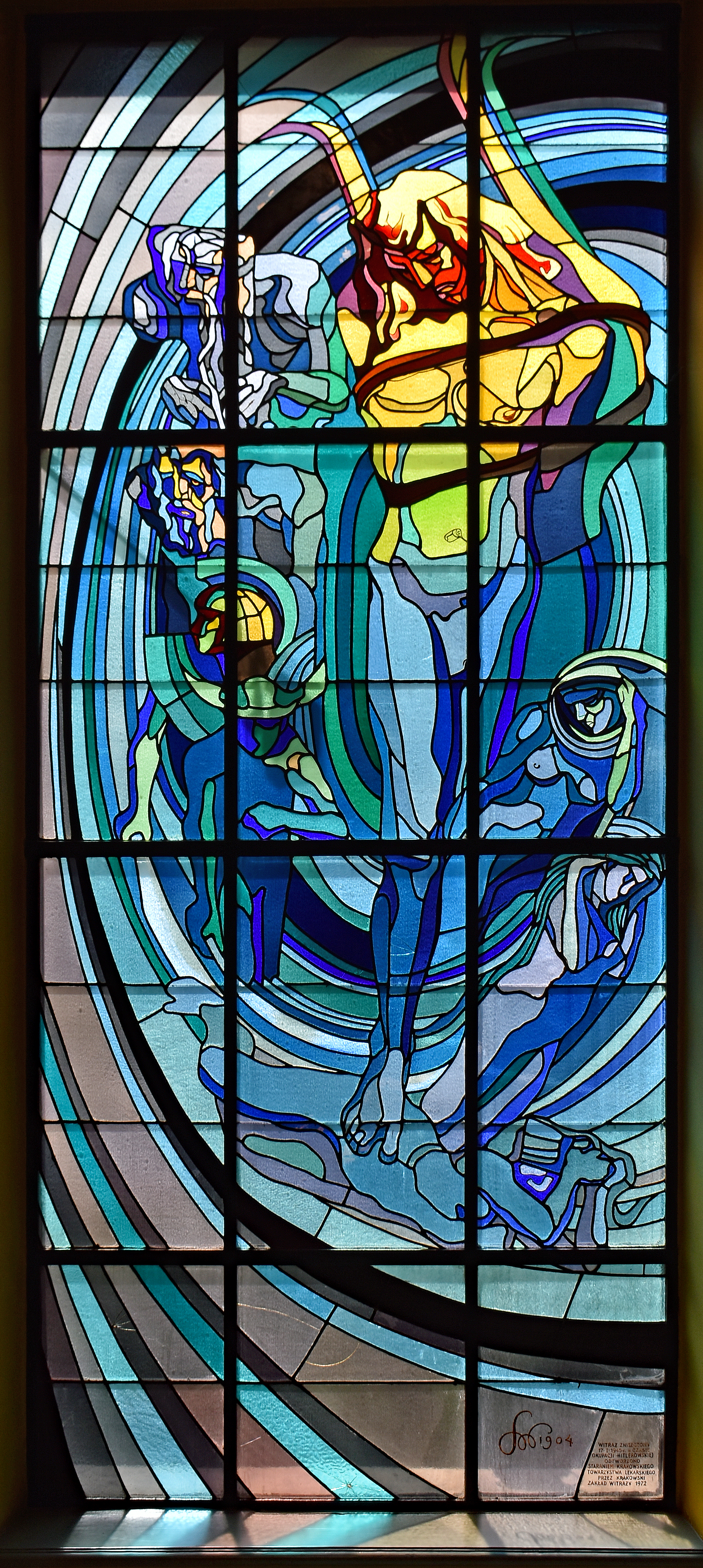
Apollo (System Copernicus), stained glass by Stanisław Wyspiański, House of the Medical Society in Kraków (1905)

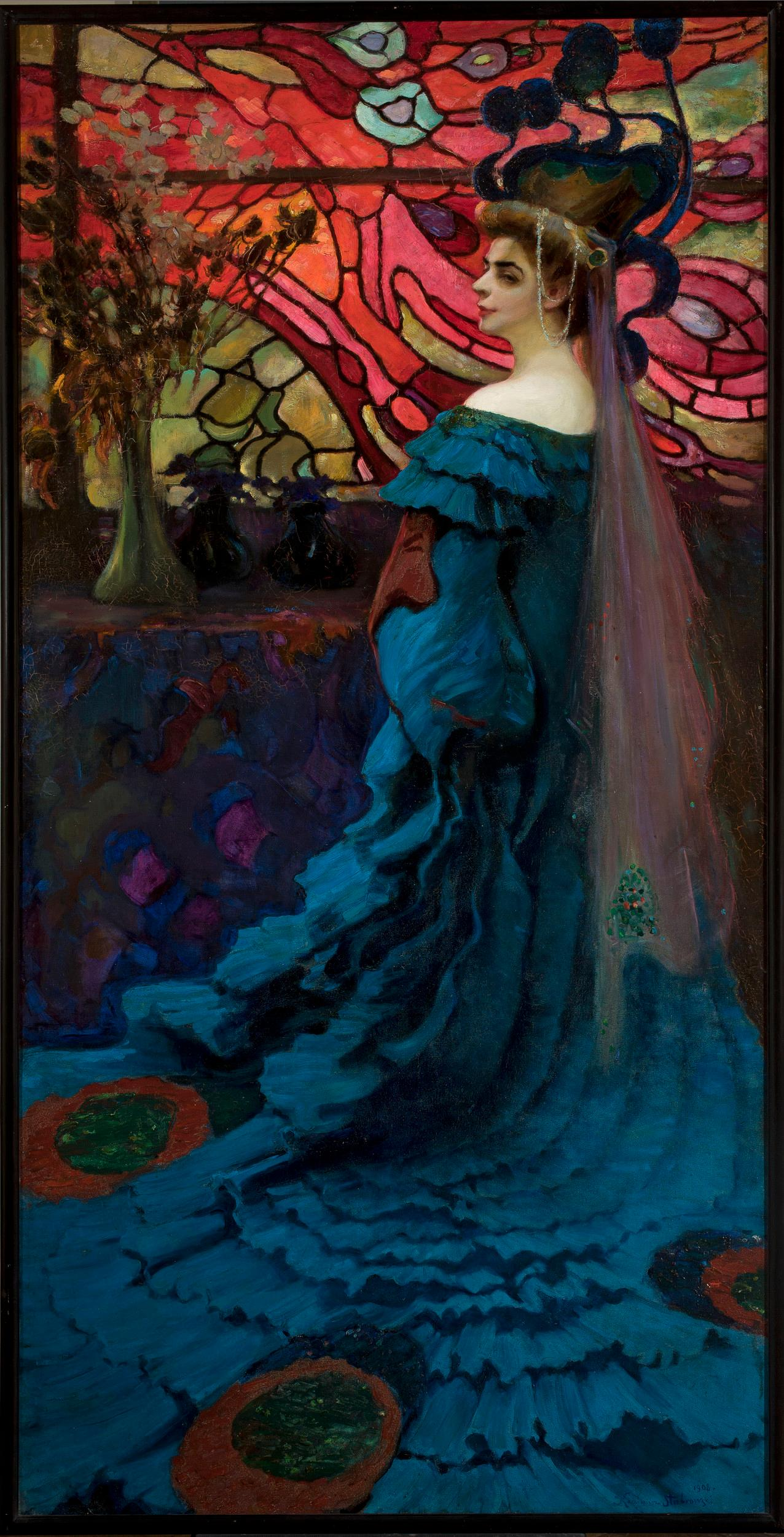
Peacock. Portrait of Zofia Borucińska by Kazimierz Stabrowski (1908)

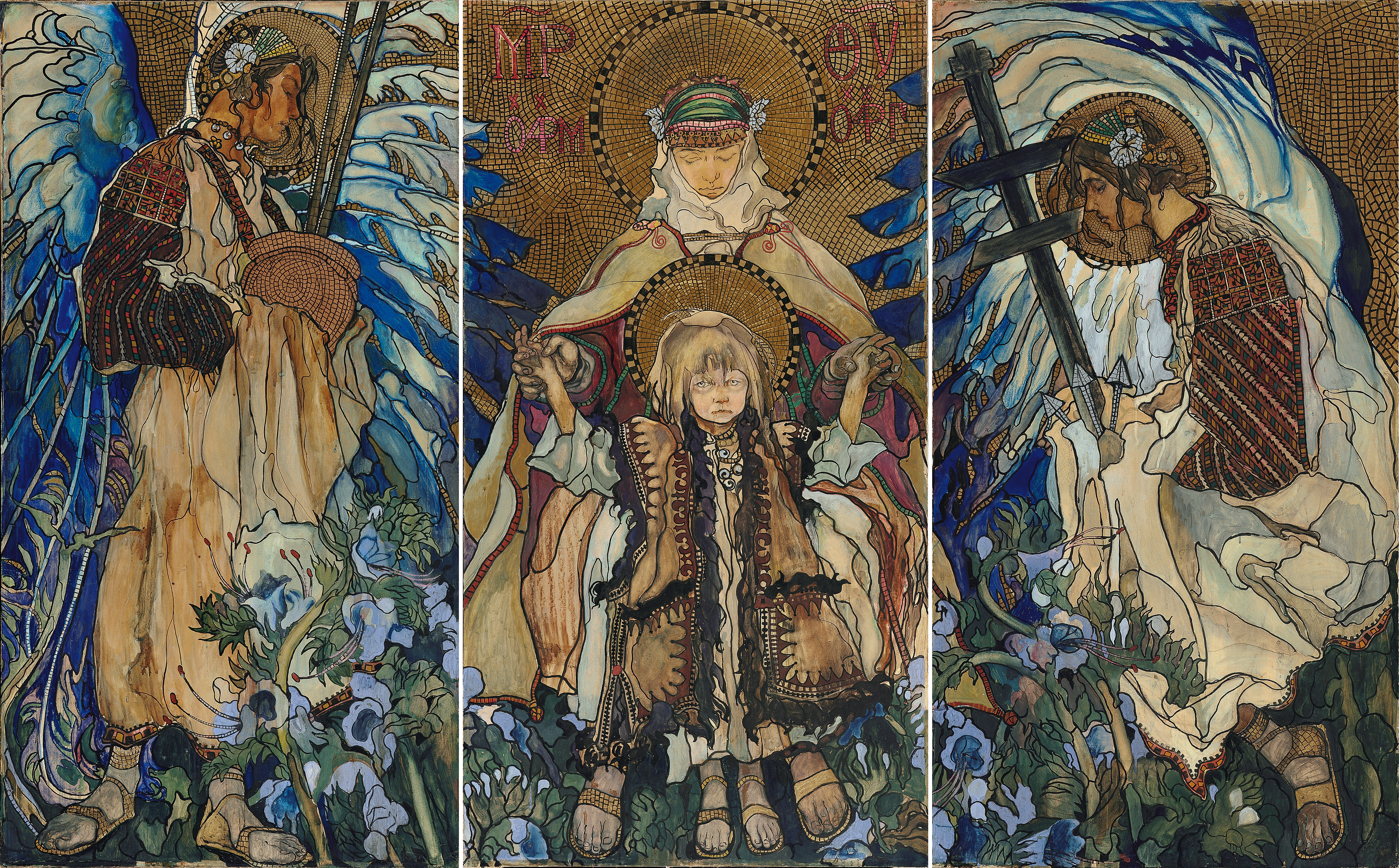
The Hutsul Madonna triptych by Kazimierz Sichulski (1909), in the Österreichische Galerie Belvedere, Vienna

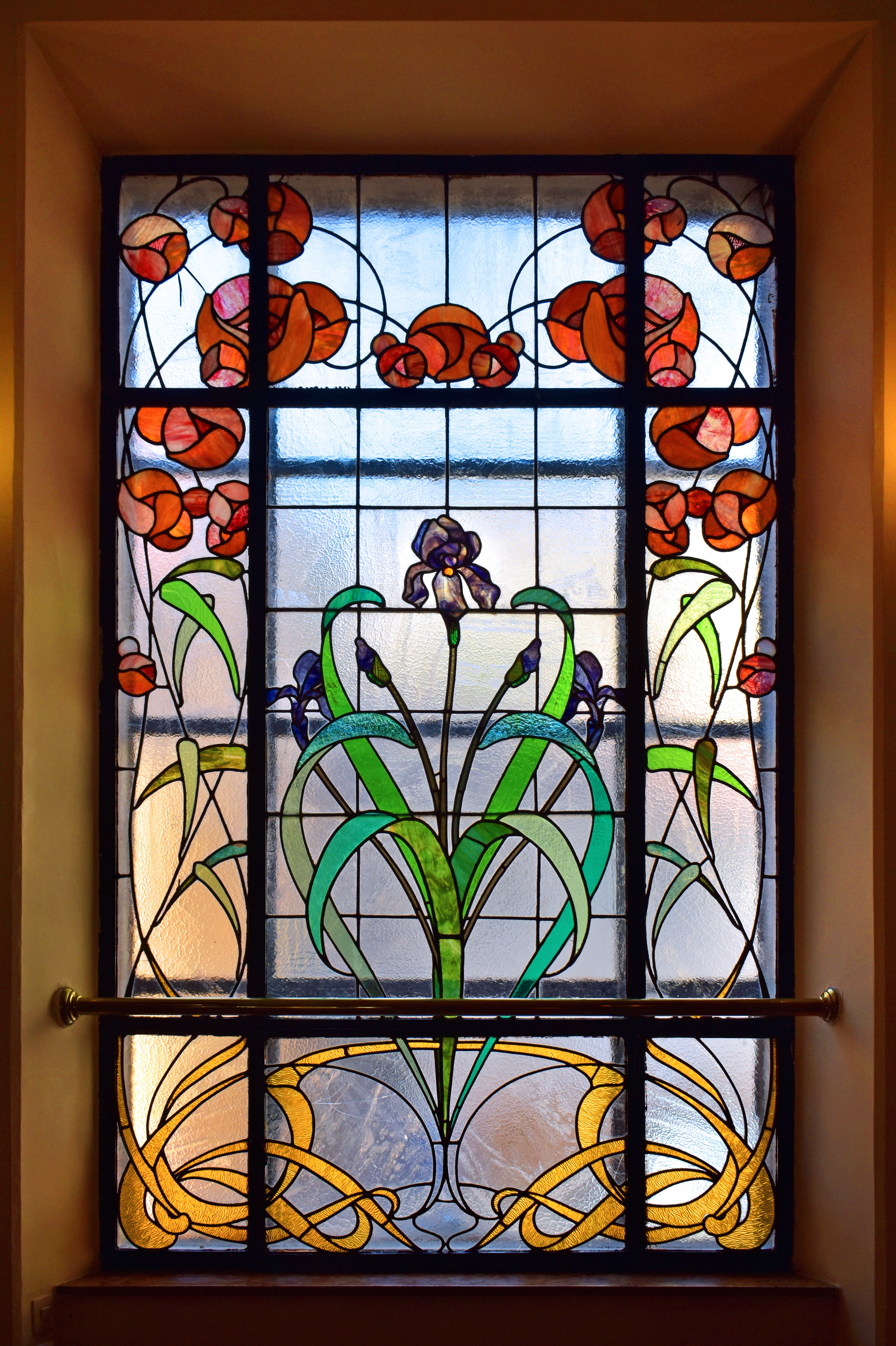
"Iris" stained glass window, Kraków, Pollera Hotel, 30 Szpitalna Street (c. 1900)

The most important centres of Secession in Galicia were Kraków, Lviv and Bielsko-Biała. The most important example of the style in Kraków is the Palace of Art (1898–1901), designed by Franciszek Mączyński under the influence of the Secession Hall in Vienna. Other important works Mączyński designed in Kraków together with Tadeusz Stryjeński: the House Under the Globe (1904–1905) and the Old Theater (1903–1906). The most important interior designers were Stanisław Wyspiański and Józef Mehoffer, who designed many stained glass windows and building interiors. The most important work of the former are the stained glasses in the Franciscan Church and in the House of the Krakow Medical Society (1905) and of the latter in the interior of the House Under the Globe.

In Lviv the most important architect was Władysław Sadłowski, who studied in Vienna and was influenced by Otto Wagner. He designed the Lviv railway station (1899–1904), the Lviv's Philharmonic (1905–1908), and the Industrial School (1907–1908). Other important architected, also inspired by Wagner, was Ivan Levynskyi.

One of the most famous buildings in Bielsko-Biała is the so-called Frog House by Emanuel Rost (1903). Other important examples of Secession were designed by Vienesse architects: Max Fabiani, the author of the house at 1 Barlickiego Street (1900) as well as Leopold Bauer, who designed the house at 51 Stojałowskiego Street (1903) and the rebuilding of the Saint Nicholas' Cathedral (1909–10).

==== Secession in Slovenia, Bosnia, Croatia and Trieste ====
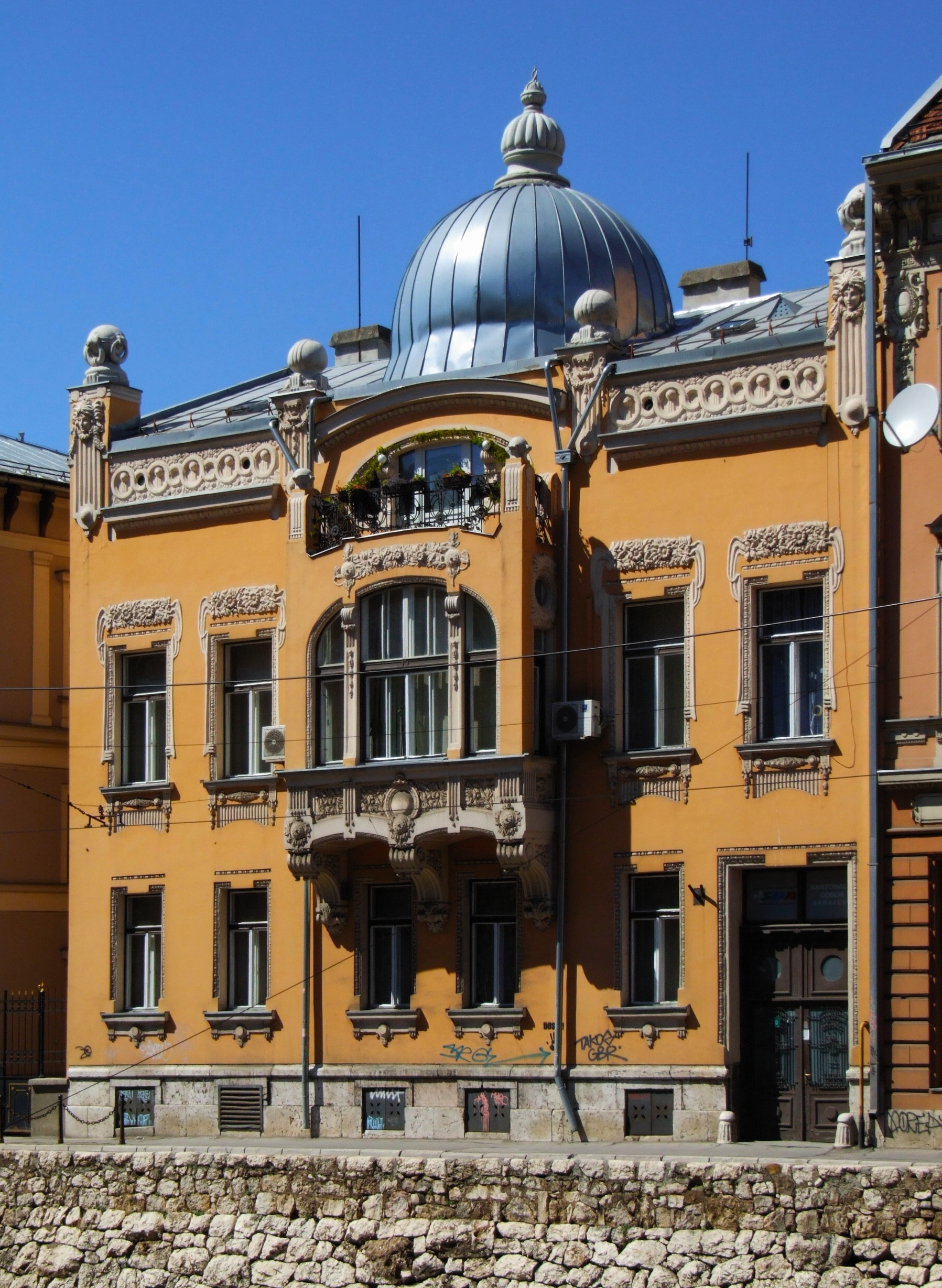
Ješua D. Salom Mansion in Sarajevo by Josip Vancaš (1901)

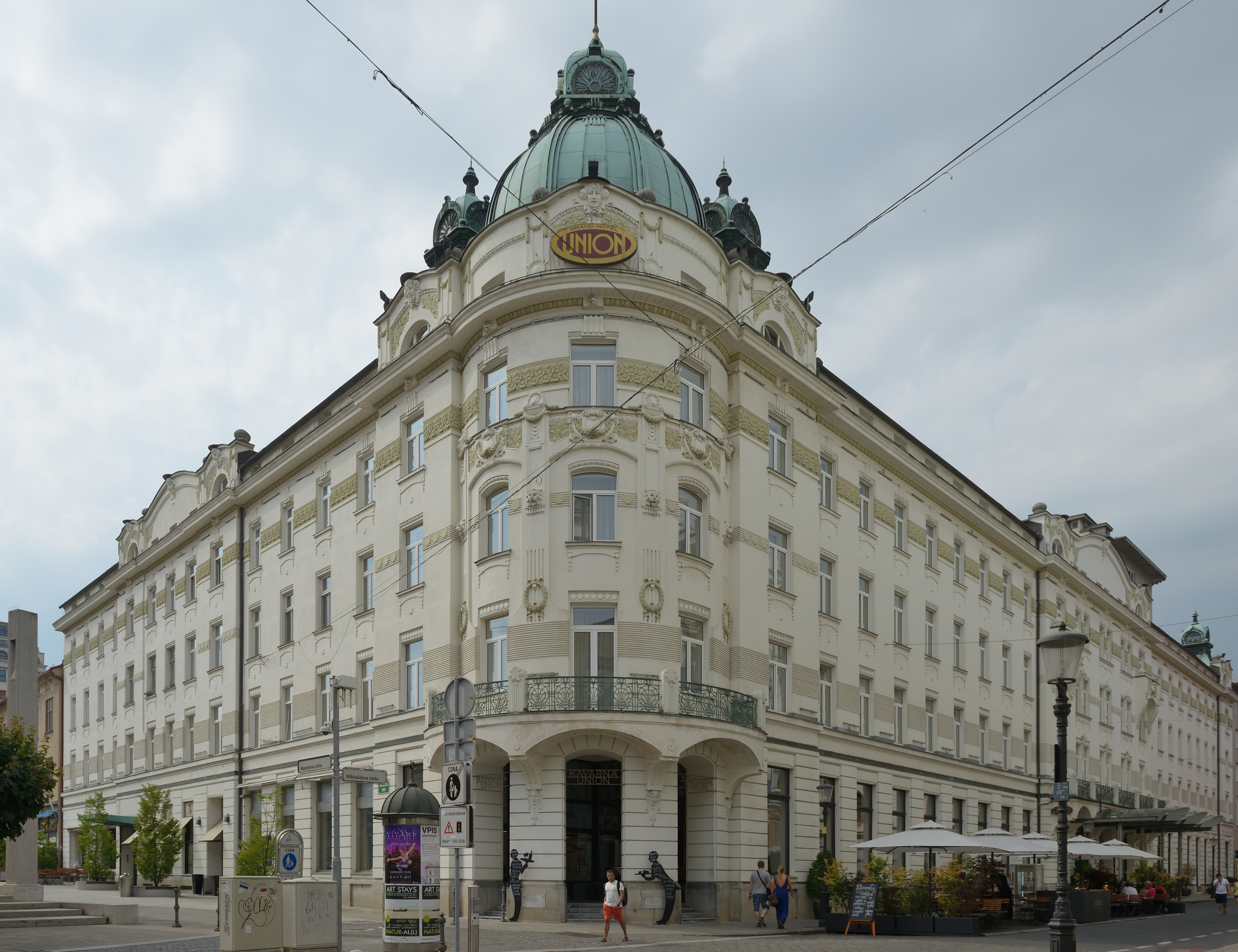
Grand Hotel Union in Ljubljana by Vancaš (1902–03)

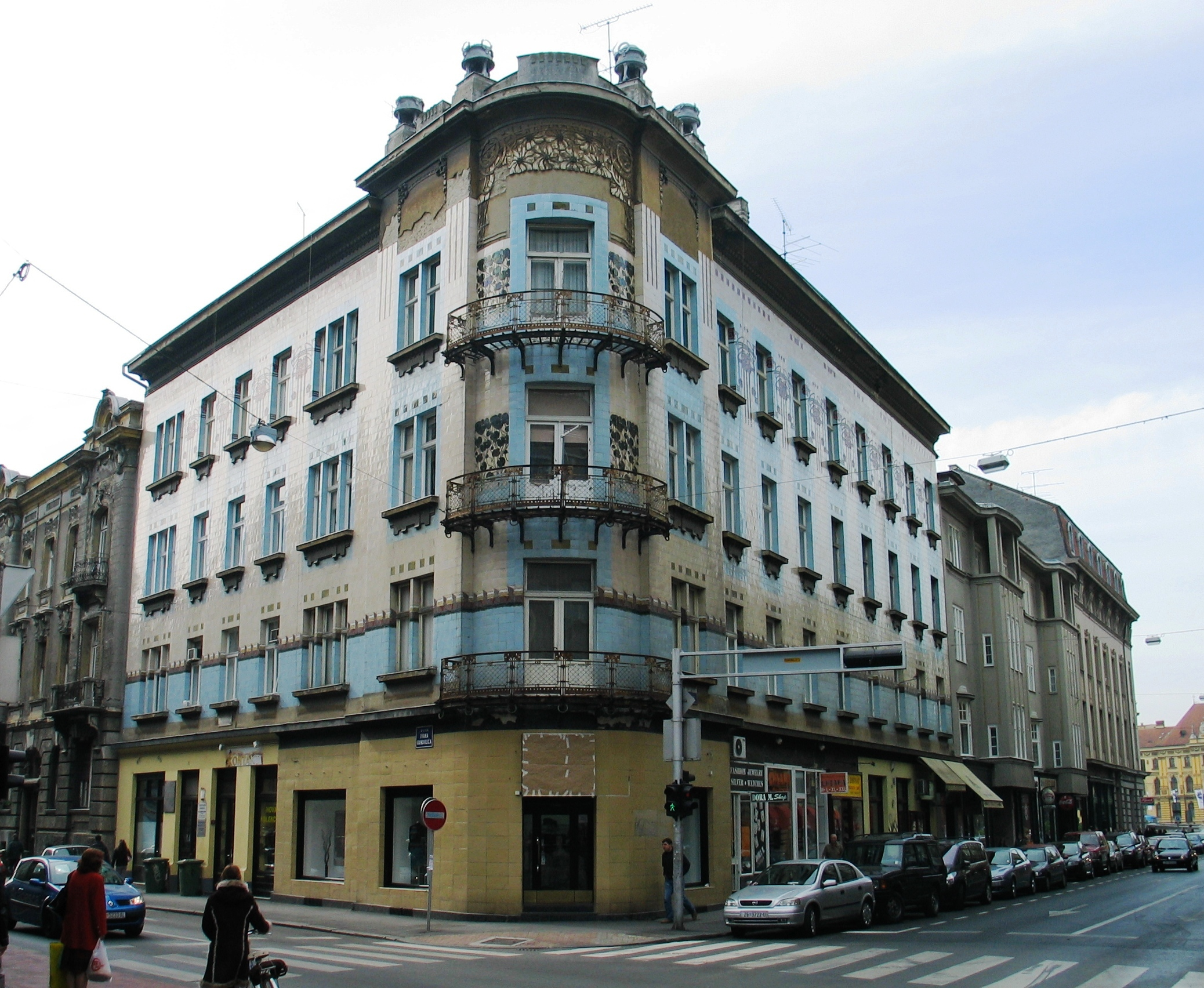
Kallina House in Zagreb by Vjekoslav Bastl (1903–04)

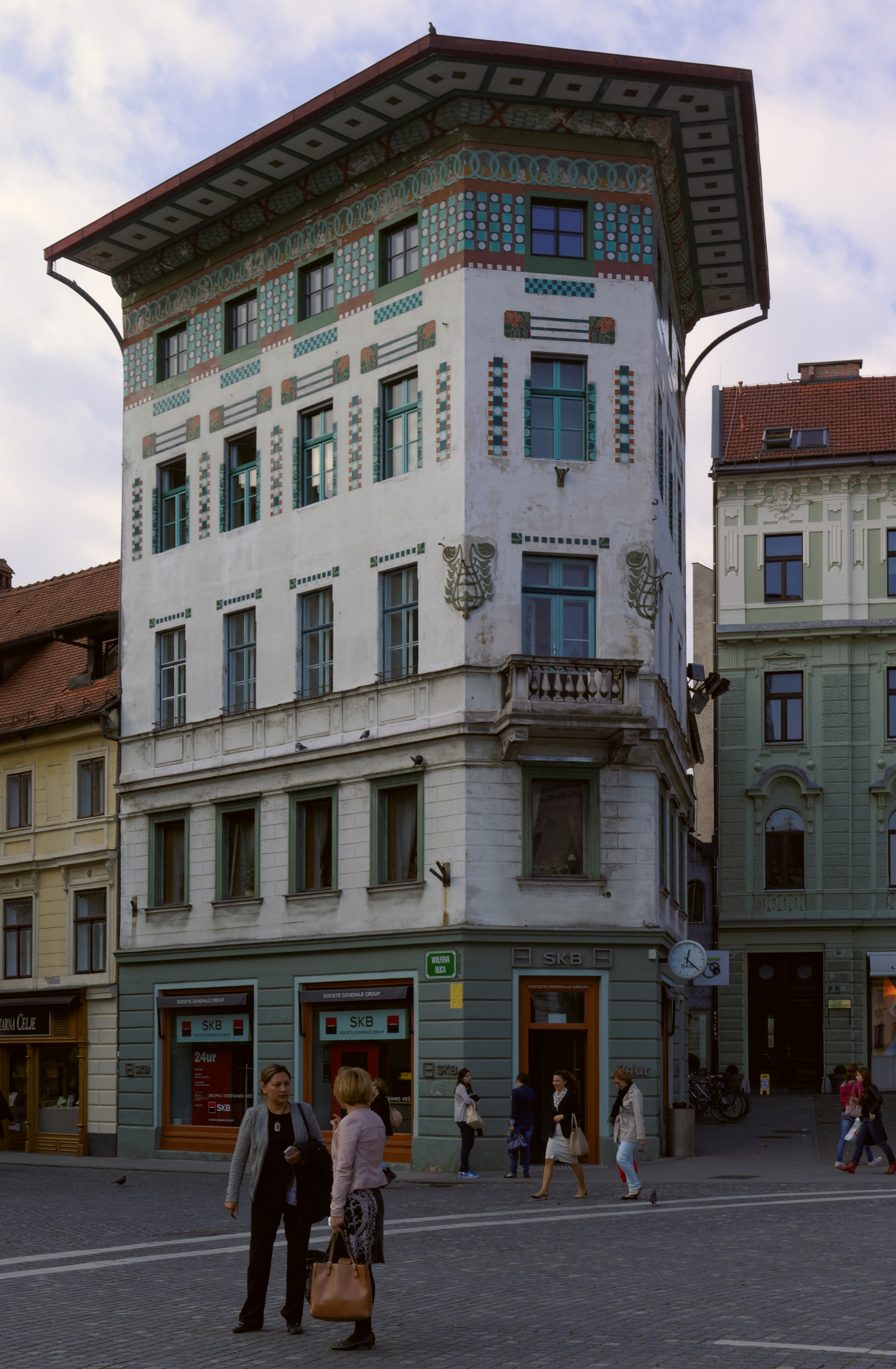
Hauptmann Building in Ljubljana by Ciril Metod Koch (1904)

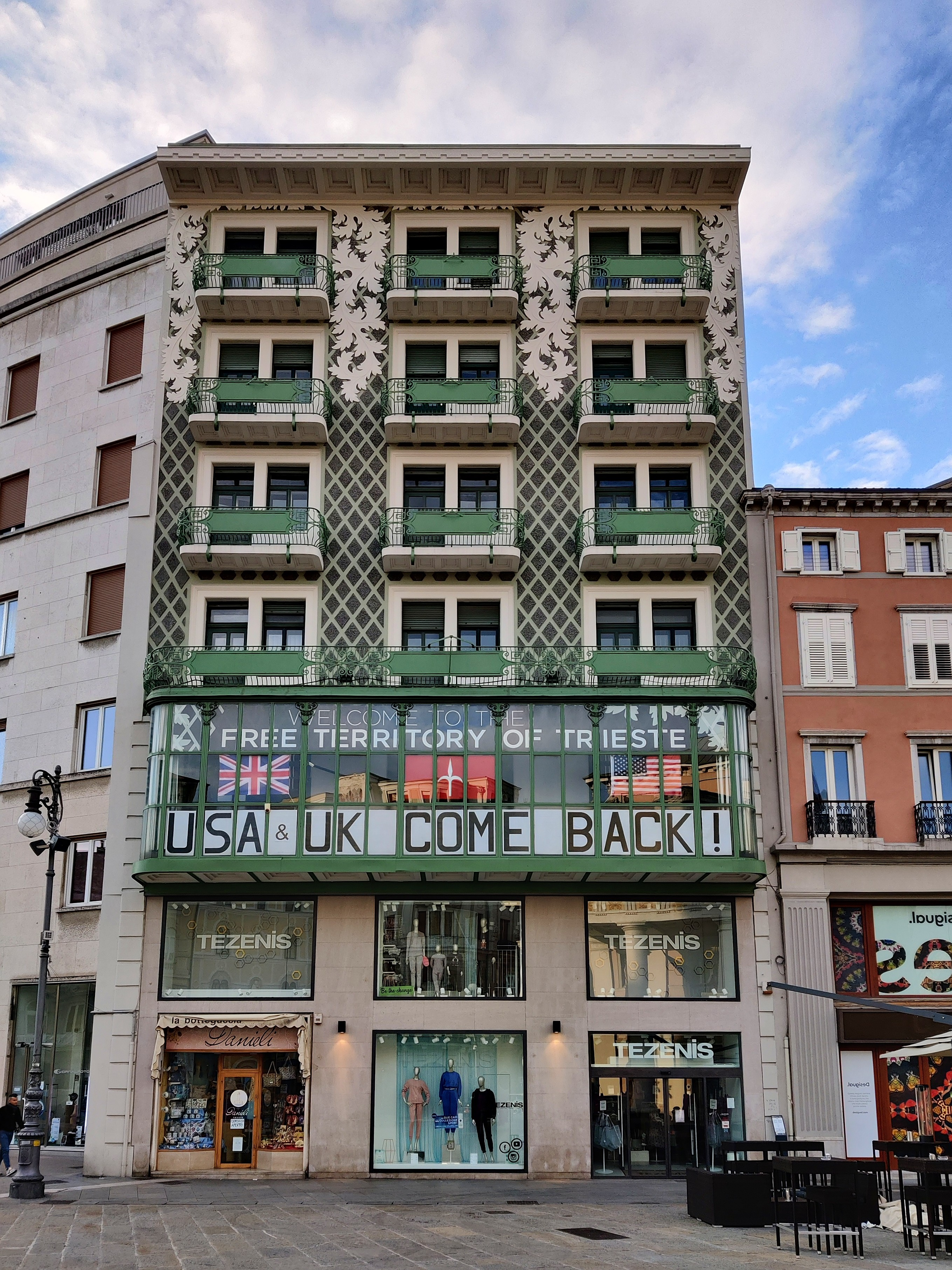
Bartoli House in Trieste by Max Fabiani (1906)

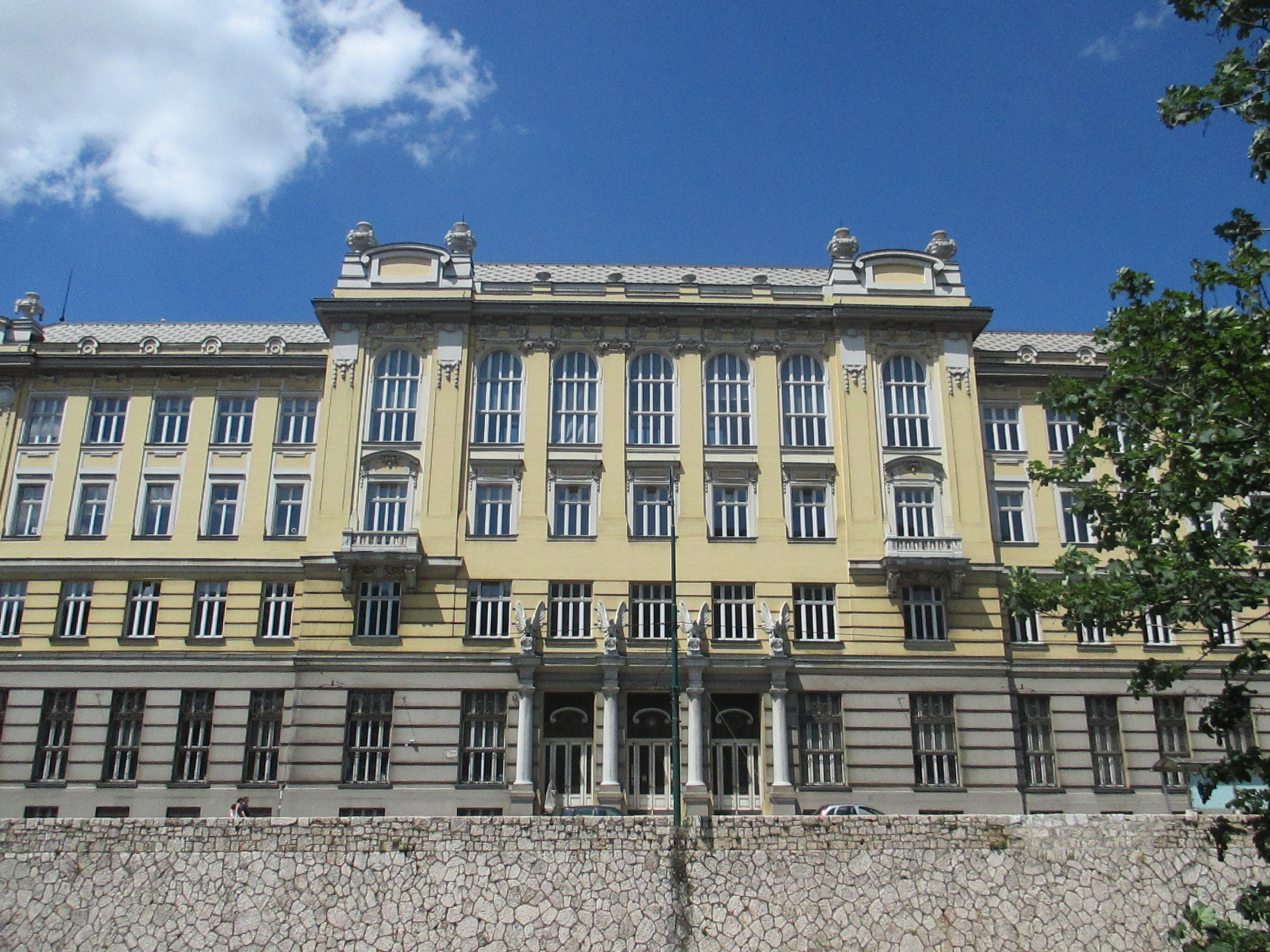
Central Post Office in Sarajevo by Vancaš (1907–1913)

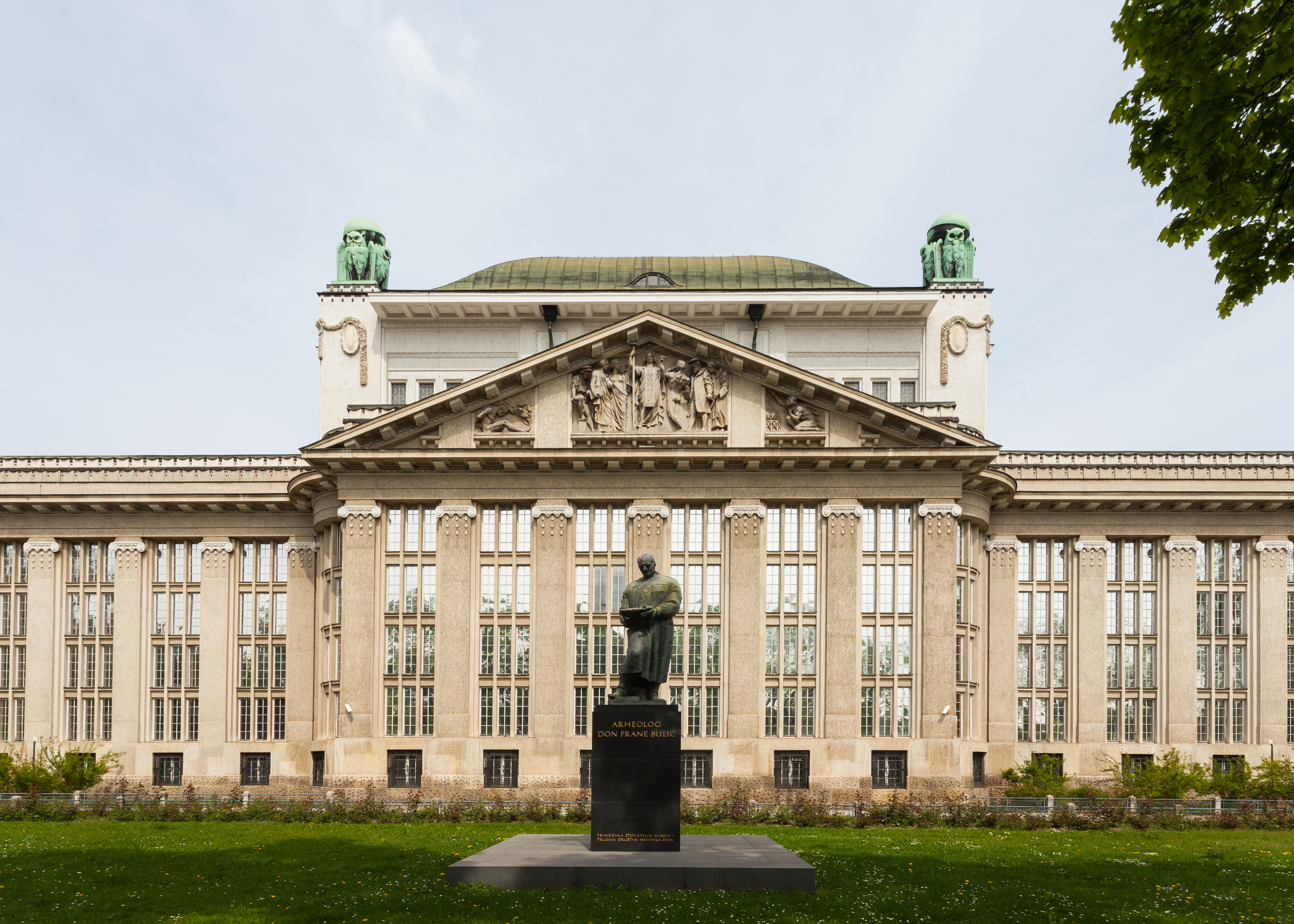
Croatian State Archives in Zagreb by Rudolf Lubinski (1911–1913)

The most prolific Slovenian Secession architect was Ciril Metod Koch. He studied at Otto Wagner's classes in Vienna and worked in the Laybach (now Ljubljana, Slovenia) City Council from 1894 to 1923. After the earthquake in Laybach in 1895, he designed many secular buildings in Secession style that he adopted from 1900 to 1910: Pogačnik House (1901), Čuden Building (1901), The Farmers Loan Bank (1906–07), renovated Hauptmann Building in Secession style in 1904. The highlight of his career was the Loan Bank in Radmannsdorf (now Radovljica) in 1906.

Other important Slovene architect, who was active also in Bosnia, was Josip Vancaš, the authot of such works like Grand Hotel Union (1902–1903) or City Savings Bank in Ljubljana (1902–1903) as well as the Ješua D. Salom Mansion (1901) and the Central Post Office in Sarajevo (1907–1913). Also Jože Plečnik and Max Fabiani, both important Vienna Secession architects, were born in Slovenia. The latter designed some buildings in Slovenia and Trieste, like the Bartoli House in Trieste (1906).

In Croatia, the most important examples of Secession include the Kallina House in Zagreb by Vjekoslav Bastl (1903–1904) and the Croatian State Archives in Zagreb by Rudolf Lubinski (1911–1913).

=== Arta 1900 or Art Nouveau in Romania ===
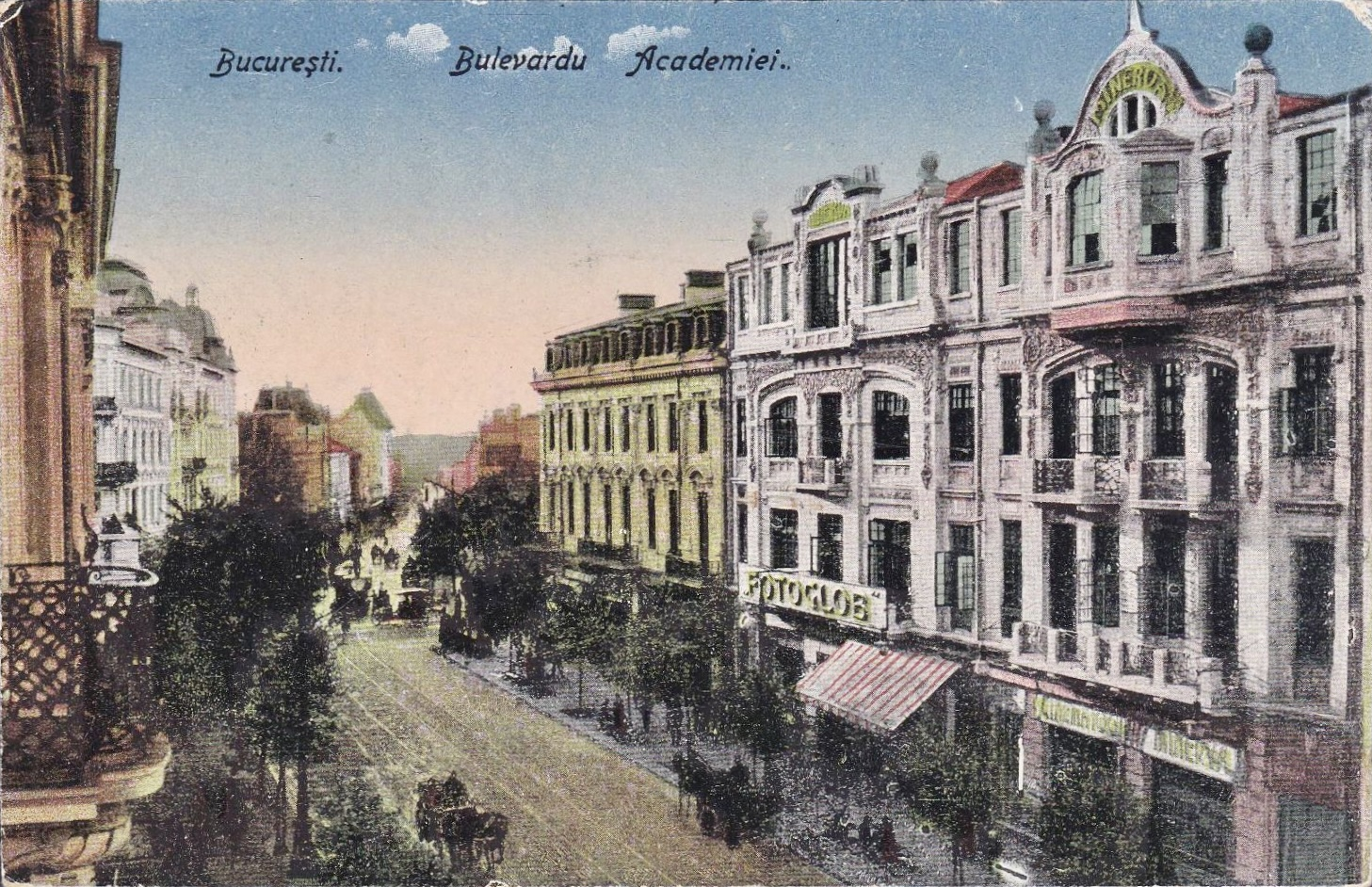
Minerva publisher headquarter on Bulevardul Regina Elisabeta in Bucharest, unknown architect (c. 1900, destroyed by WW2 bombardments)

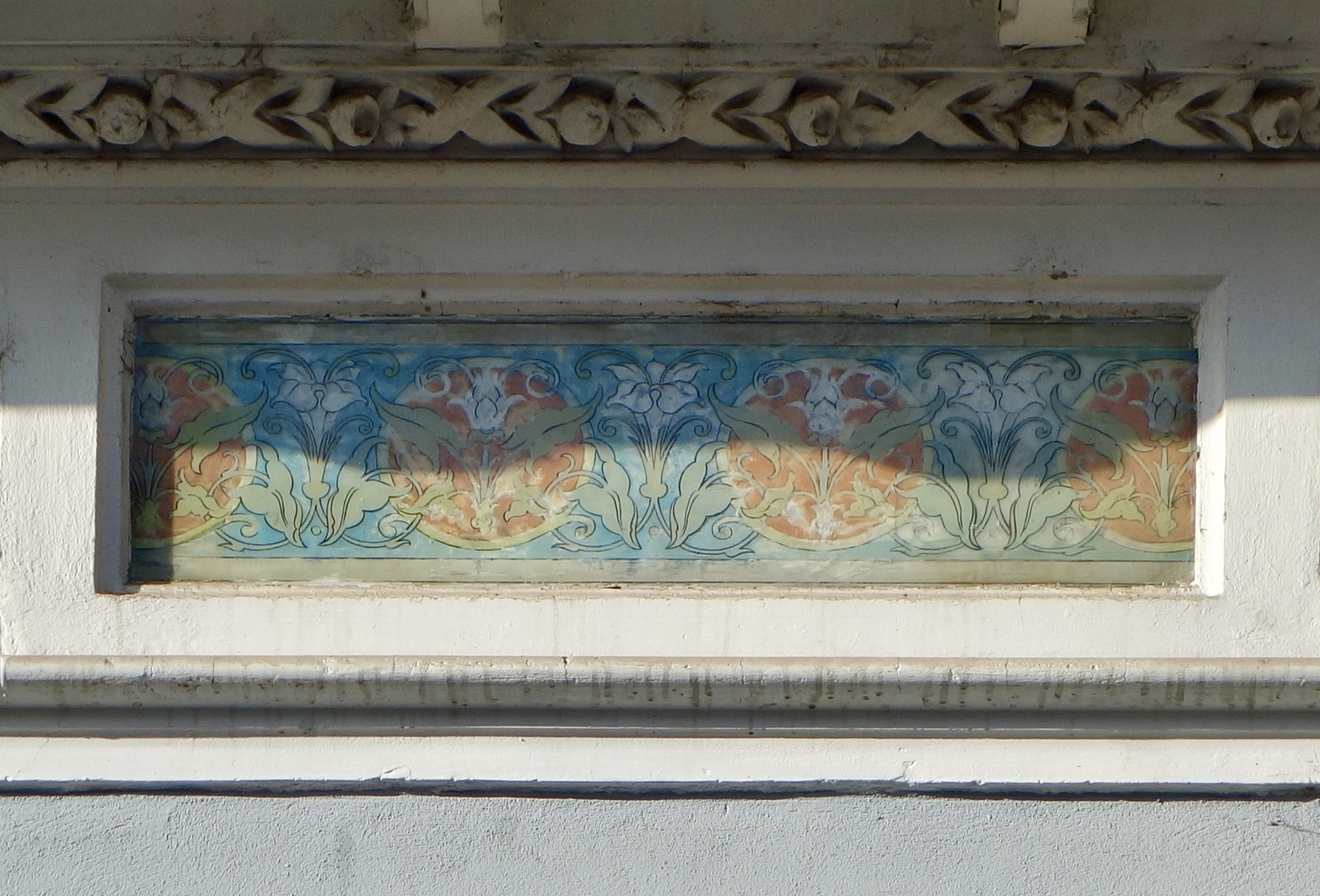
Frieze of Strada Constantin F. Robescu no. 1 in Bucharest, unknown architect (c. 1900)

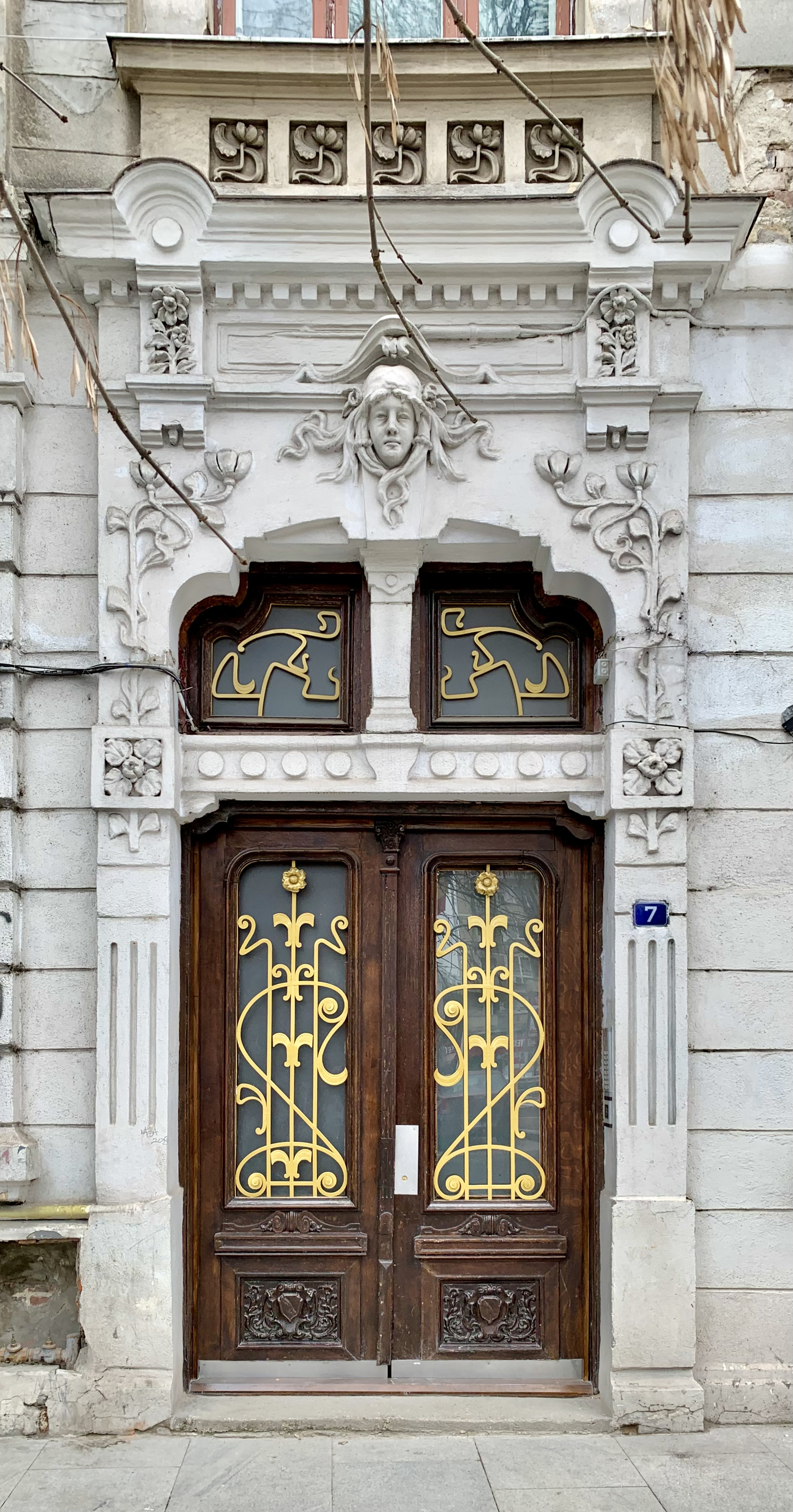
Door of Piața Mihail Kogălniceanu no. 7 in Bucharest, unknown architect (c. 1900)

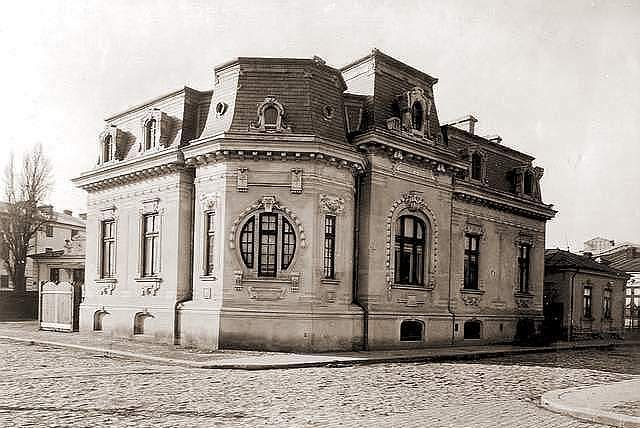
Mixed with Beaux-Arts architecture - Romulus Porescu House (Strada Doctor Paleologu no. 12) in Bucharest by Dimitrie Maimarolu (1905)

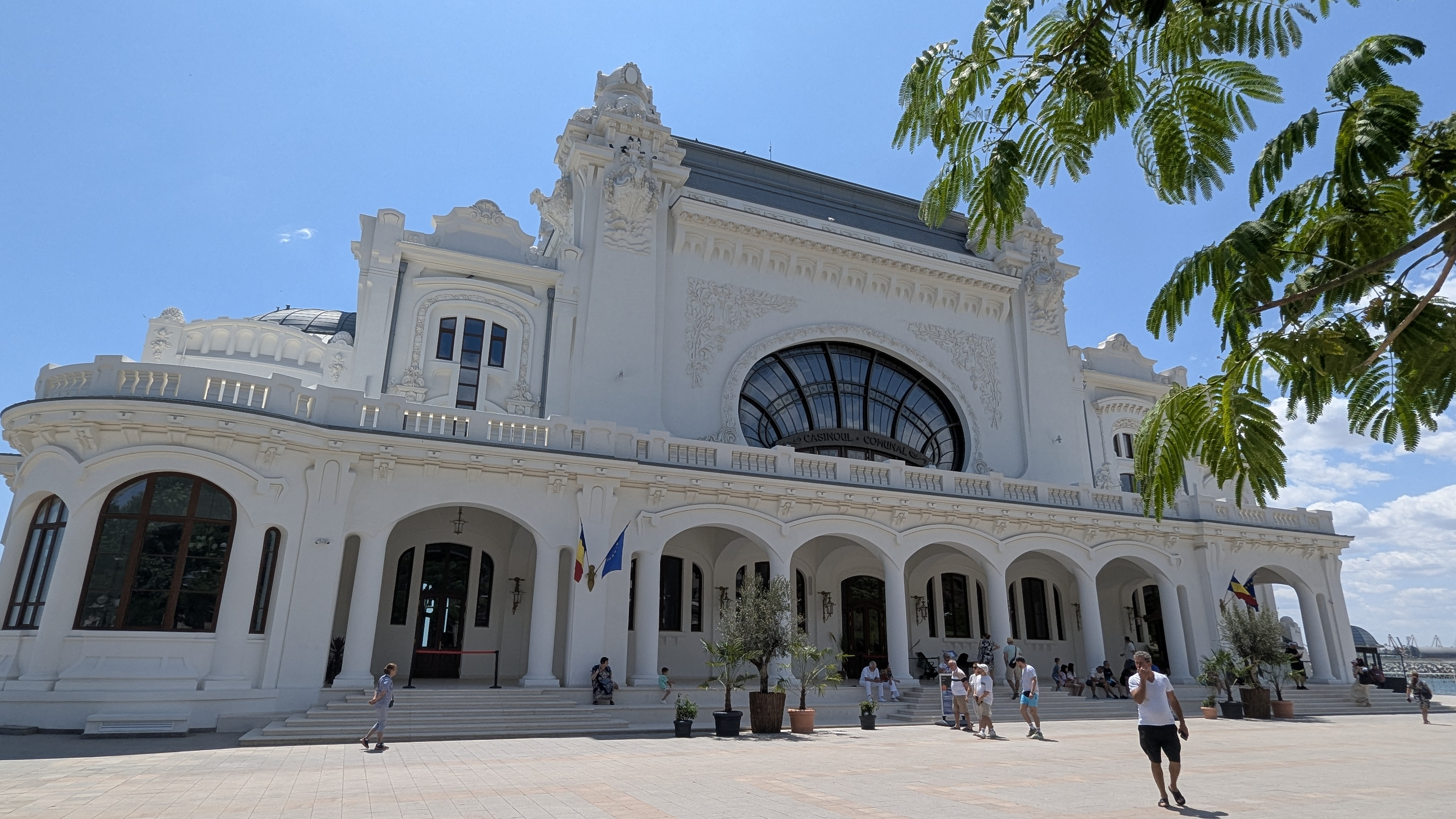
Constanța Casino in Constanța by Daniel Renard and Petre Antonescu (1905–1910)

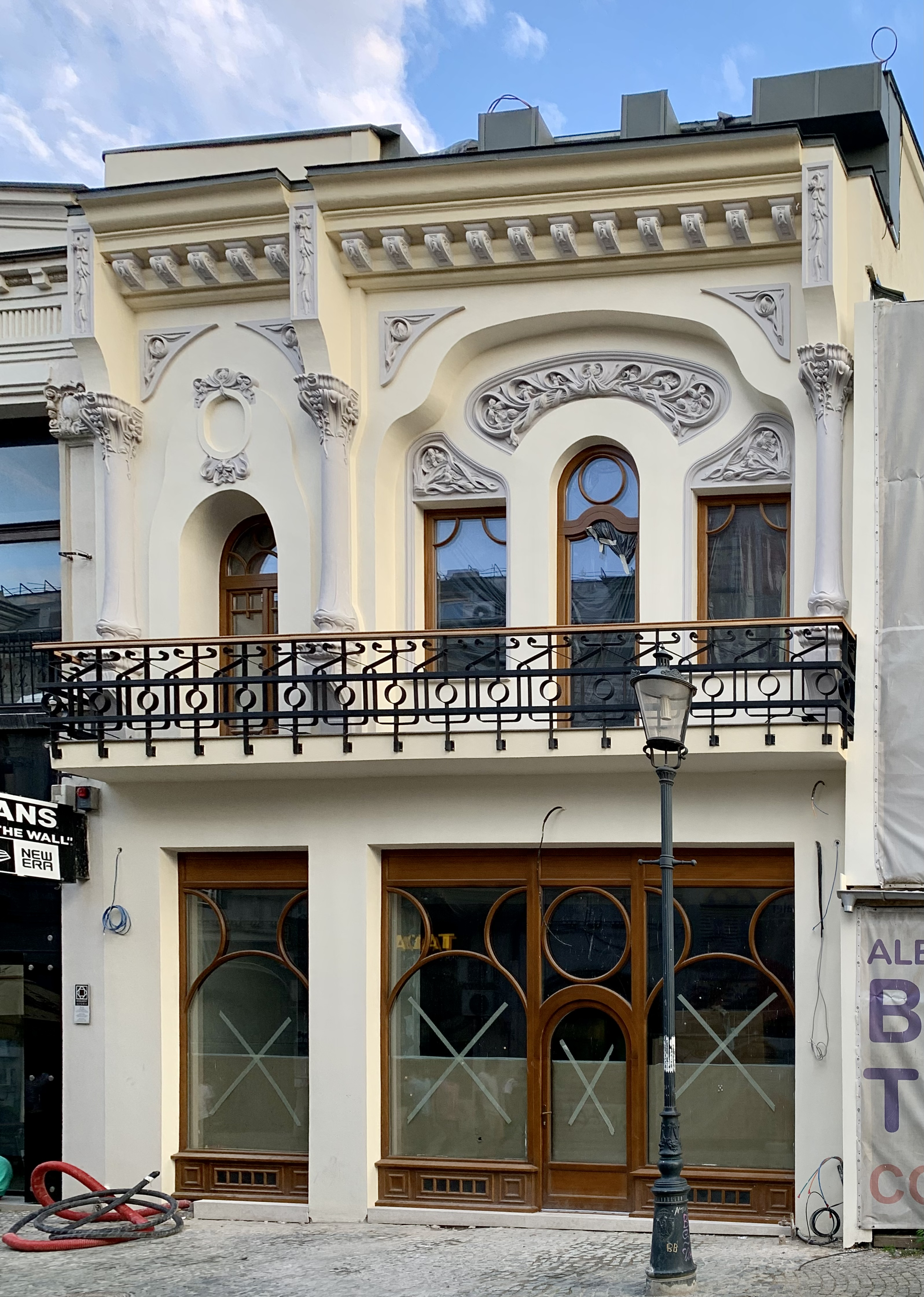
Mixed with Beaux-Arts architecture - Former Al. Assan shop (Strada Lipscani no. 72–74) in Bucharest, unknown architect (before 1906)

Art Nouveau appeared in Romania during the same years as in Western Europe (early 1890s until the outbreak of World War I in 1914), but here few of the buildings are in this style, the Beaux-Arts style being predominant. The most famous is the Constanța Casino. Most of the Romanian examples of Art Nouveau architecture are actually mixes of Beaux Arts and Art Nouveau, like the Romulus Porescu House or house no. 61 on Strada Vasile Lascăr, both in Bucharest. This is similar to what was happening in France, where eclecticism was more popular, pure Art Nouveau buildings and structures being relatively rare. Despite most houses from the reign of Carol I being Beaux-Arts, some of them have Art Nouveau stoves inside, since the style of the exterior did not always dictate that of the stove or the entire interior.

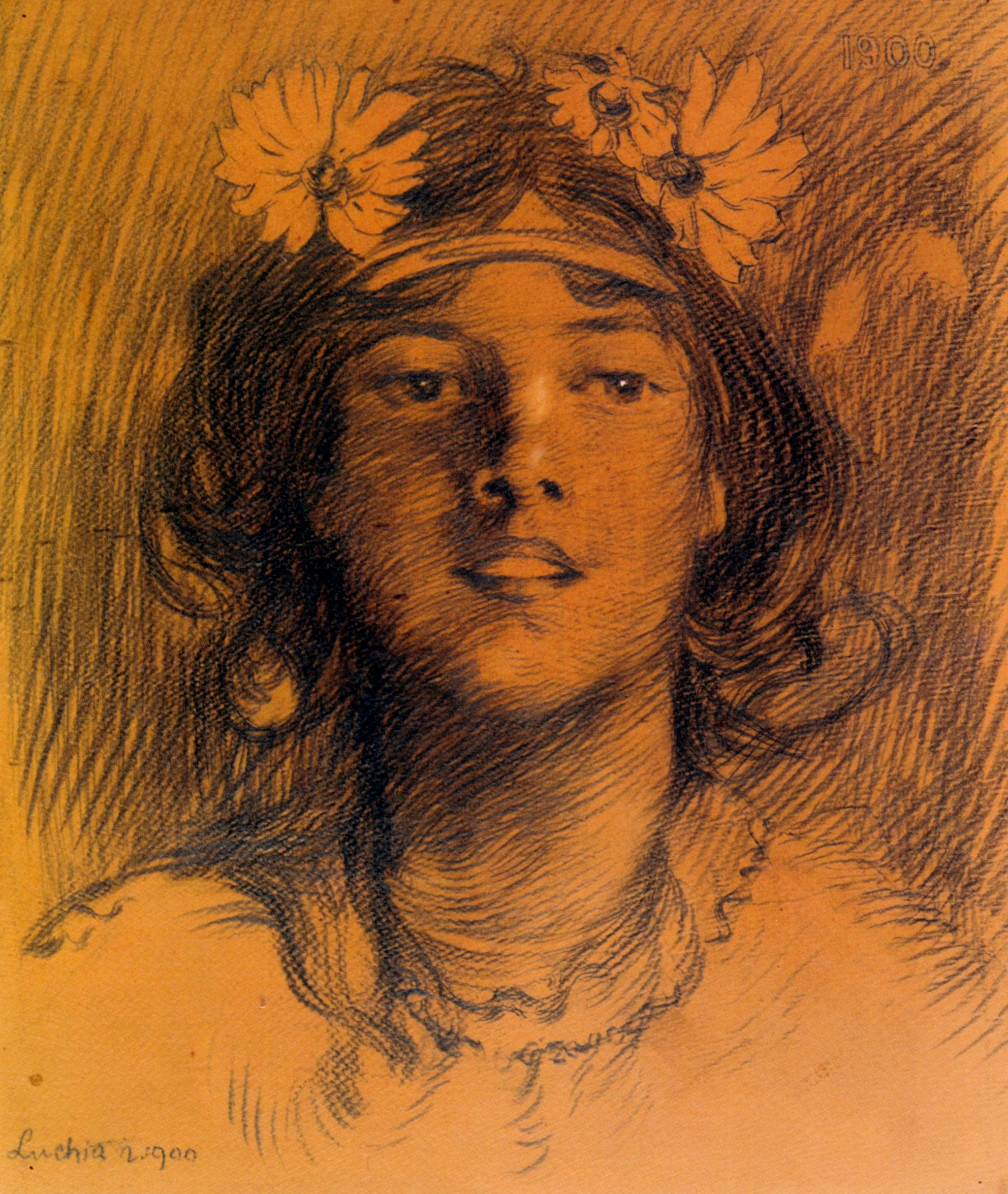
Young woman by Ștefan Luchian, drawing for the cover of Ileana magazine (1900)

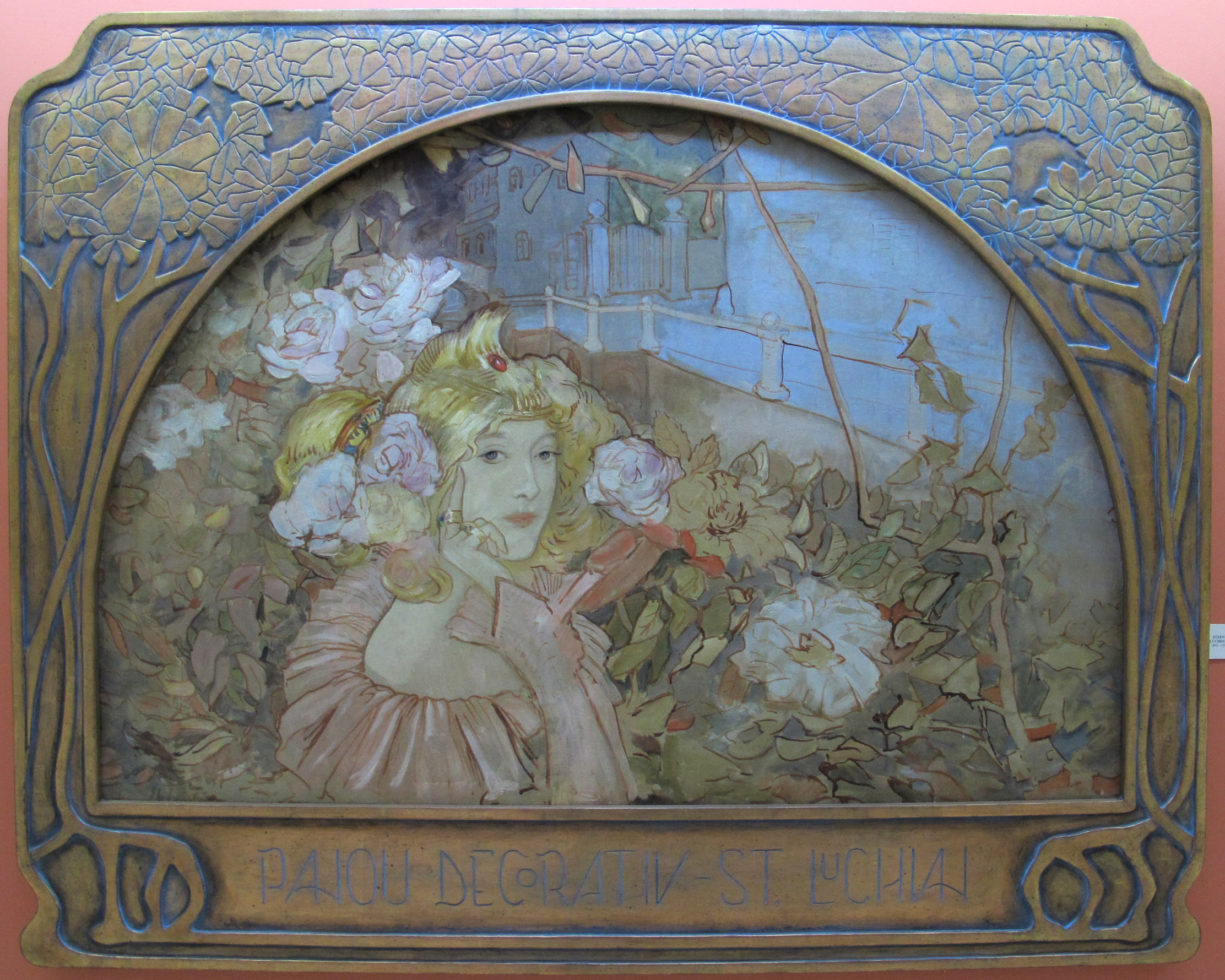
Spring, decorative panel by Luchian (1901)

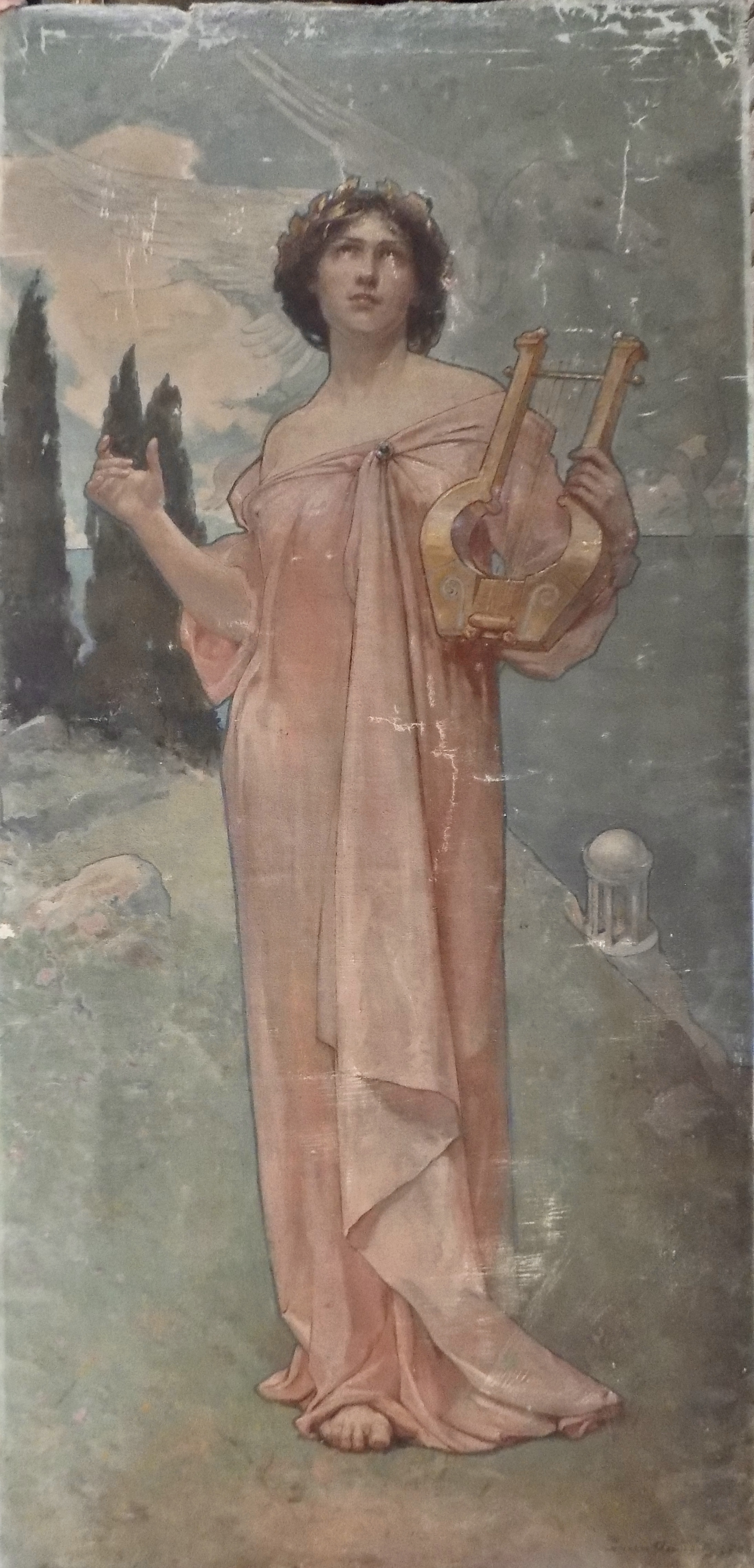
Woman with Lyre (Allegory of Music) by Nicolae Vermont (1903)

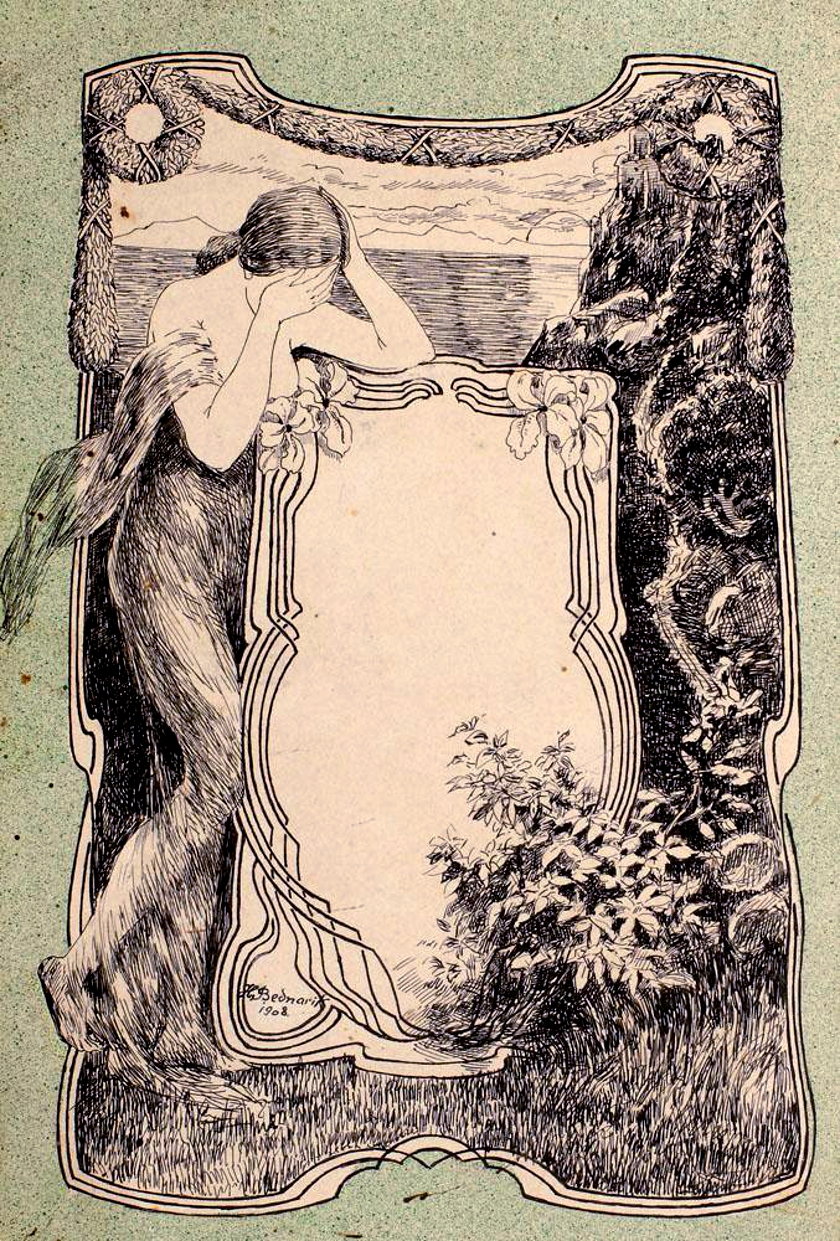
The Water Fairy by Elena Alexandrina Bednarik (1908)

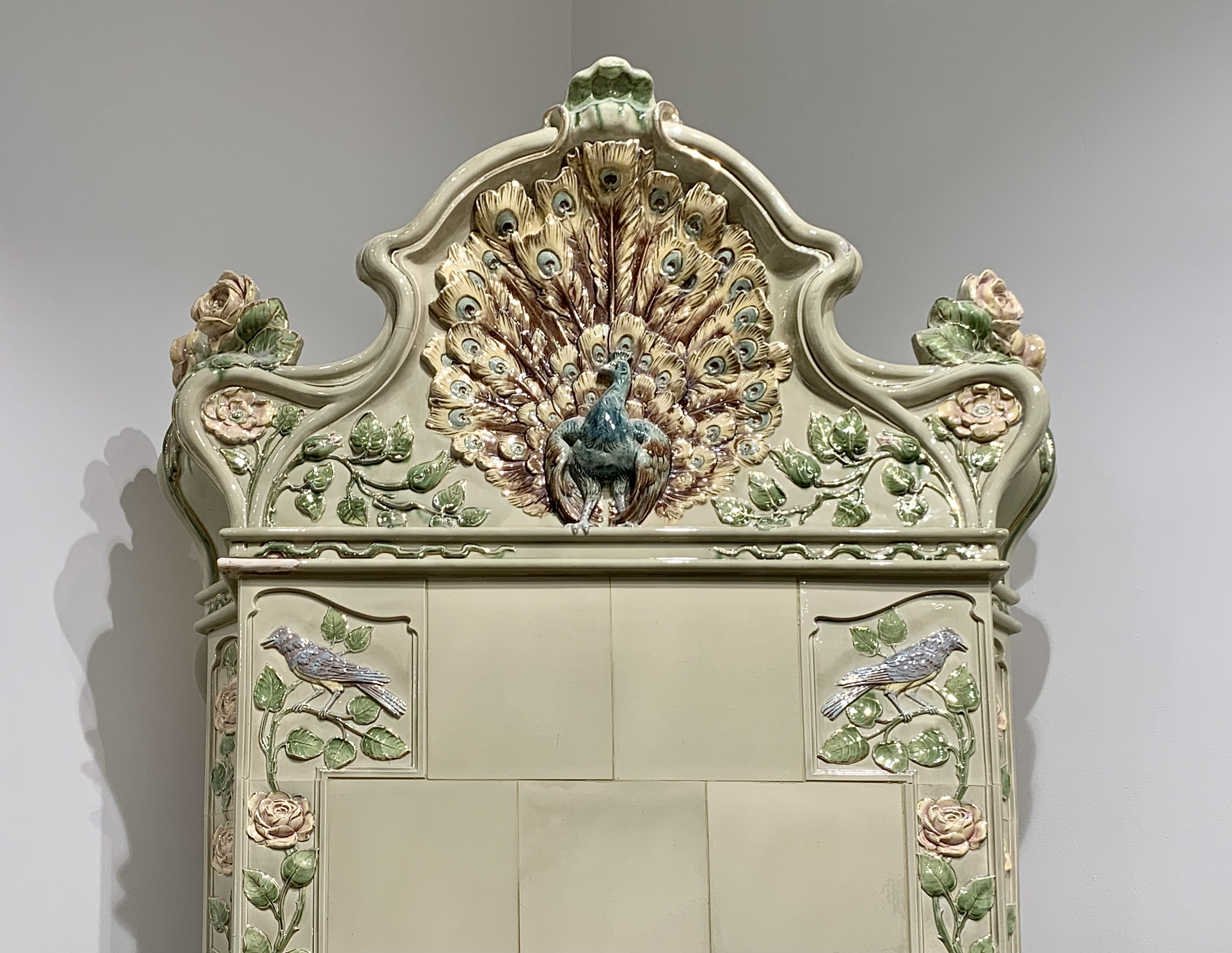
Stove in the Mița the Cyclist House (Strada Biserica Amzei no. 9), Bucharest, possibly designed by Nicolae C. Mihăescu (1908)

One of the most notable Art Nouveau painters from Romania was Ștefan Luchian, who quickly took over the innovative and decorative directions of Art Nouveau for a short period of time. This period coincided with the founding of the Ileana Society in 1897, of which he was a founding member, a society that organized an exhibition at the Union Hotel titled The Exhibition of Independent Artists (1898) and published the Ileana Magazine.

Transylvania has examples of both Art Nouveau and Romanian Revival buildings, the former being from the Austro-Hungarian era. Most of them can be found in Oradea, nicknamed the "Art Nouveau capital of Romania", but also in Timișoara, Târgu Mureș and Sibiu.

=== Stile Liberty in Italy ===
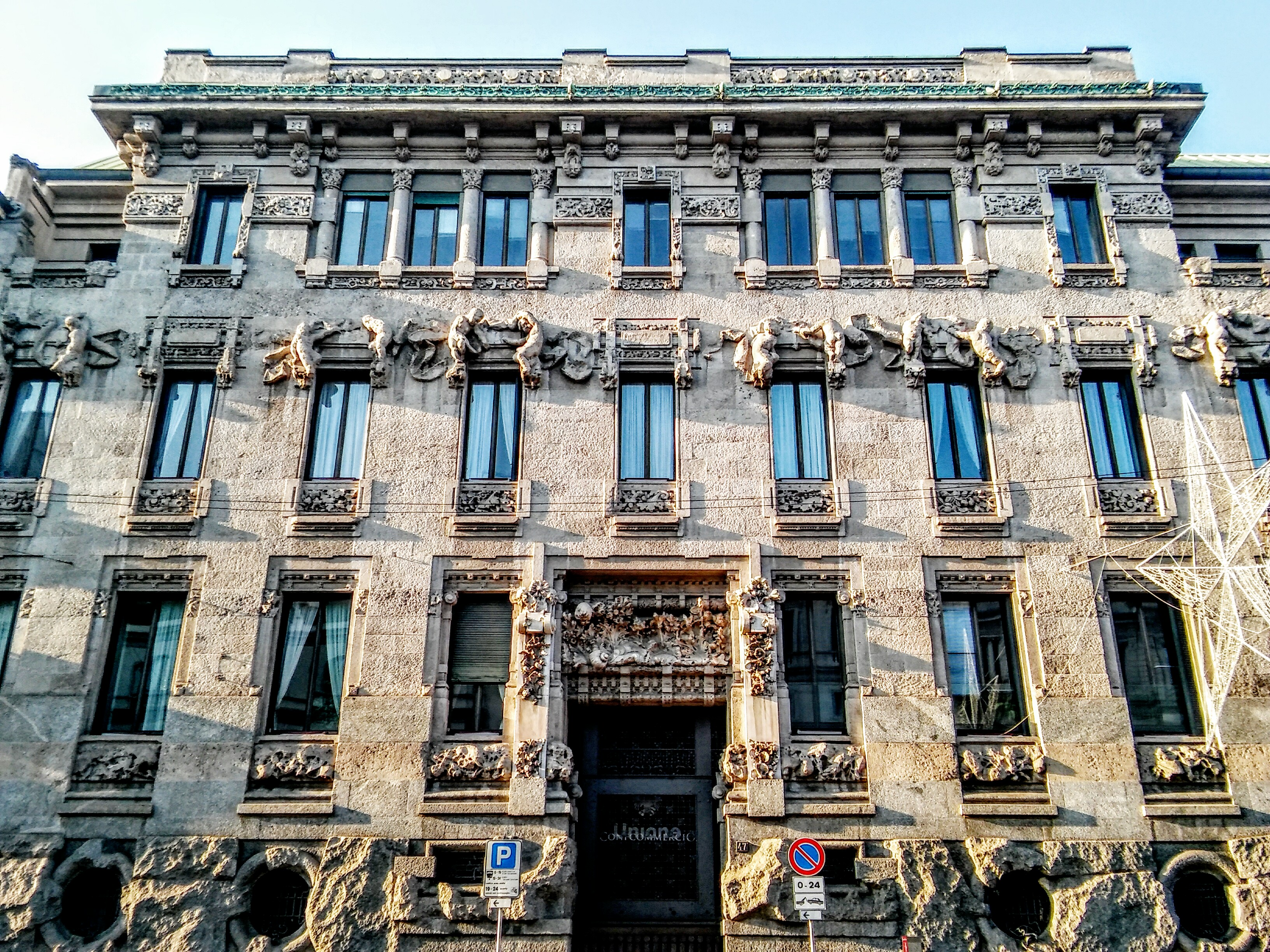
Palazzo Castiglioni in Milan by Giuseppe Sommaruga (1901–1903)

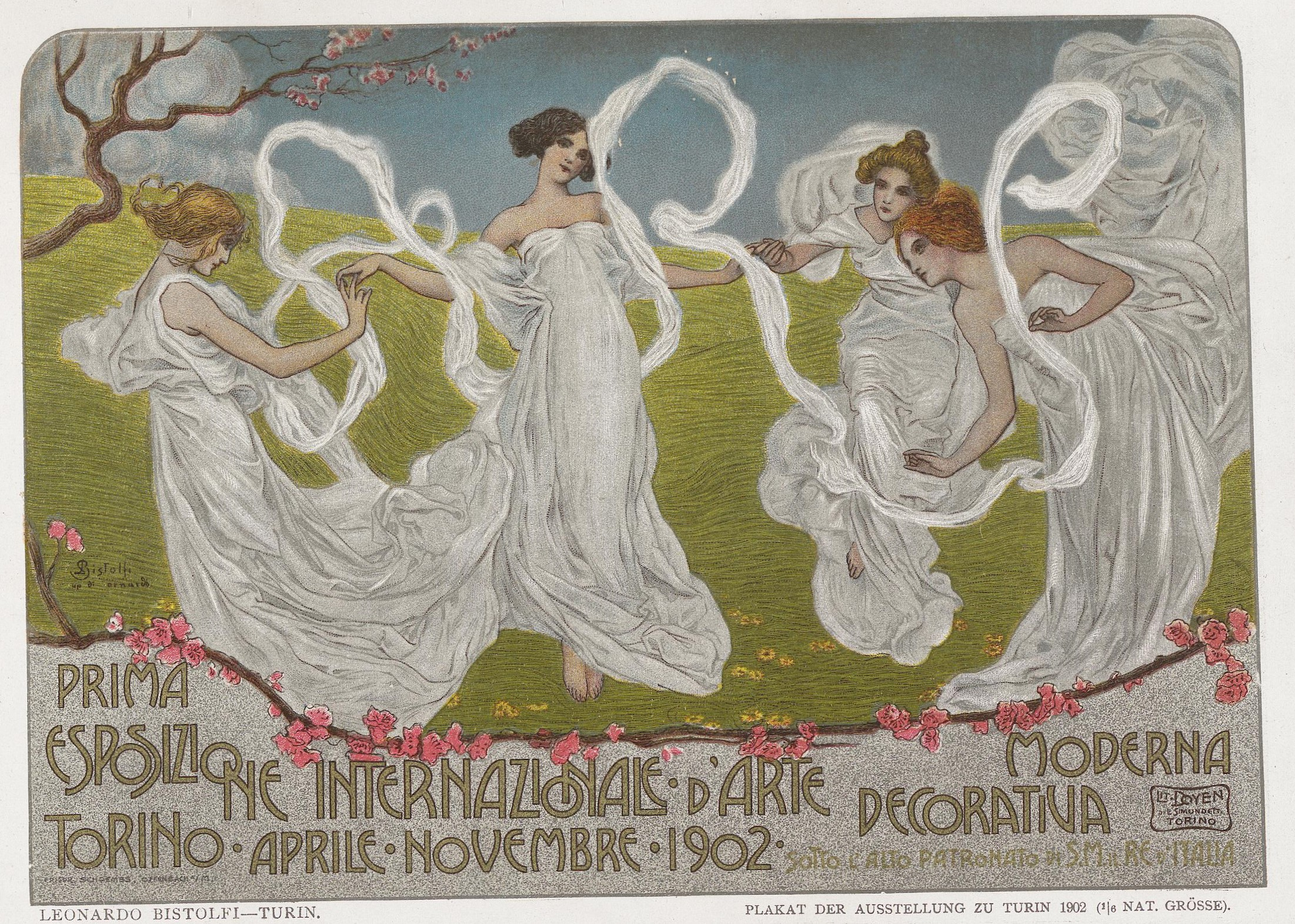
Poster for the 1902 Turin Exposition by Leonardo Bistolfi

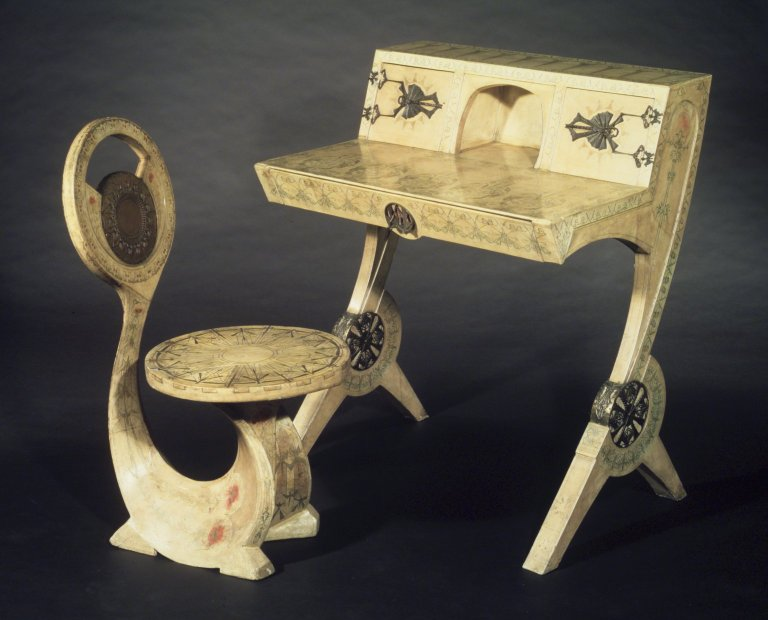
Cobra chair and desk by Carlo Bugatti (1902), in the Brooklyn Museum, New York City

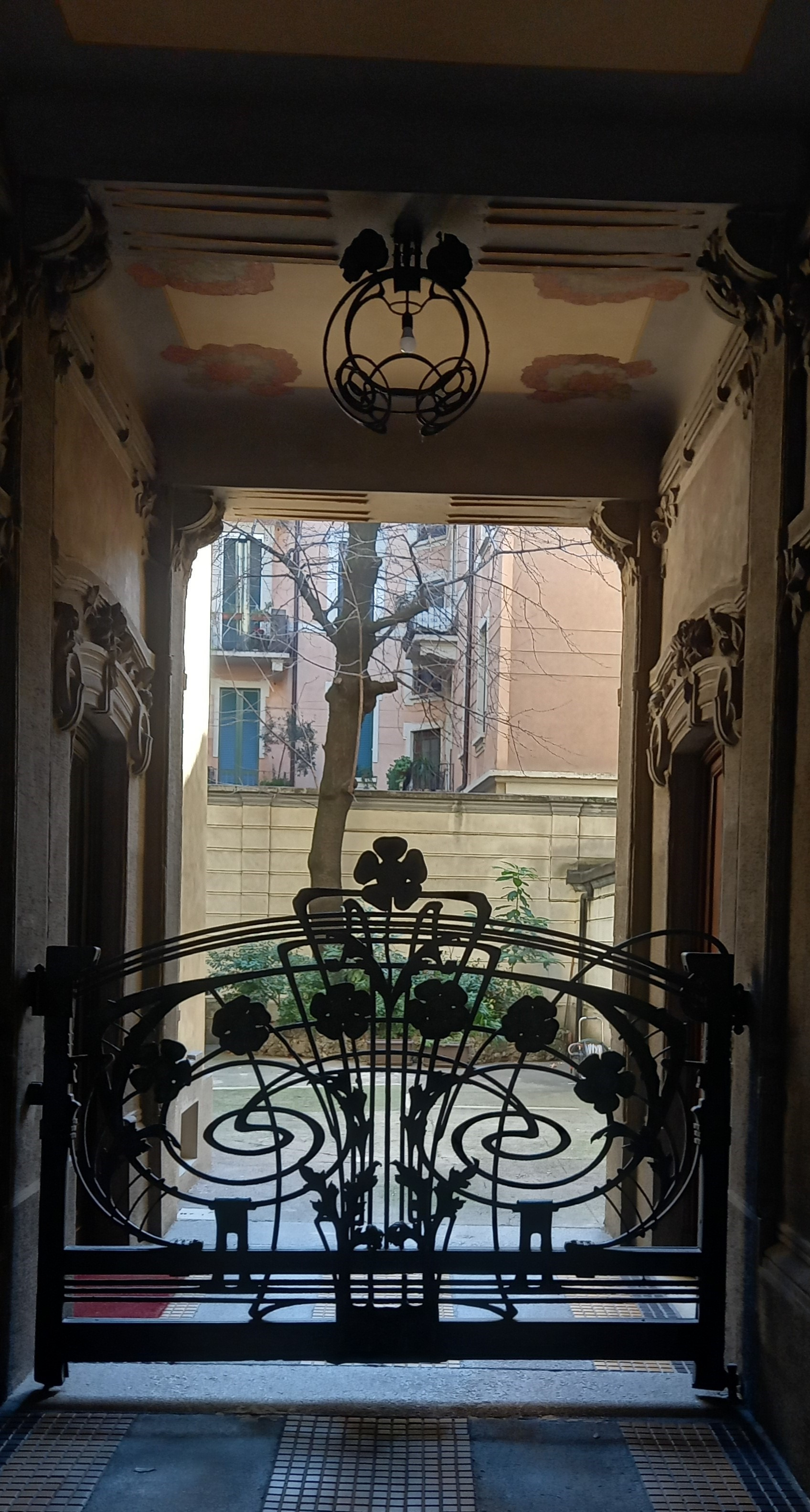
Entrance of Casa Guazzoni in Milan by Giovanni Battista Bossi (1904–1906)

Art Nouveau in Italy was known as arte nuova, stile floreale, stile moderno and especially stile Liberty. Liberty style took its name from Arthur Lasenby Liberty and the store he founded in 1874 in London, Liberty department store, which specialised in importing ornaments, textiles and art objects from Japan and the Far East, and whose colourful textiles which were particularly popular in Italy. Notable Italian designers in the style included Galileo Chini, whose ceramics were often inspired both by majolica patterns. He was later known as a painter and a theatrical scenery designer; he designed the sets for two celebrated Puccini operas Gianni Schicchi and Turandot.

Liberty style architecture varied greatly, and often followed historical styles, particularly the Baroque. Façades were often drenched with decoration and sculpture. Examples of the Liberty style include the Villino Florio (1899–1902) by Ernesto Basile in Palermo; the Palazzo Castiglioni in Milan by Giuseppe Sommaruga (1901–1903); Milan, and the Casa Guazzoni (1904–05) in Milan by Giovanni Battista Bossi (1904–06).

Colorful frescoes, painted or in ceramics, and sculpture, both in the interior and exterior, were a popular feature of Liberty style. They drew upon both classical and floral themes. as in the baths of Acque della Salute, and in the Casa Guazzoni in Milan.

The most important figure in Liberty style design was Carlo Bugatti, the son of an architect and decorator, as well as the father of the Liberty sculptor Rembrandt Bugatti, and of the automobile designer Ettore Bugatti. He studied at the Milanese Academy of Brera, and later the Académie des Beaux-Arts in Paris. His work was distinguished by its exoticism and eccentricity, included silverware, textiles, ceramics, and musical instruments, but he is best remembered for his innovative furniture designs, shown first in the 1888 Milan Fine Arts Fair. His furniture often featured a keyhole design, and had unusual coverings, including parchment and silk, and inlays of bone and ivory. It also sometimes had surprising organic shapes, copied after snails and cobras.

=== Art Nouveau and Secession in Serbia ===
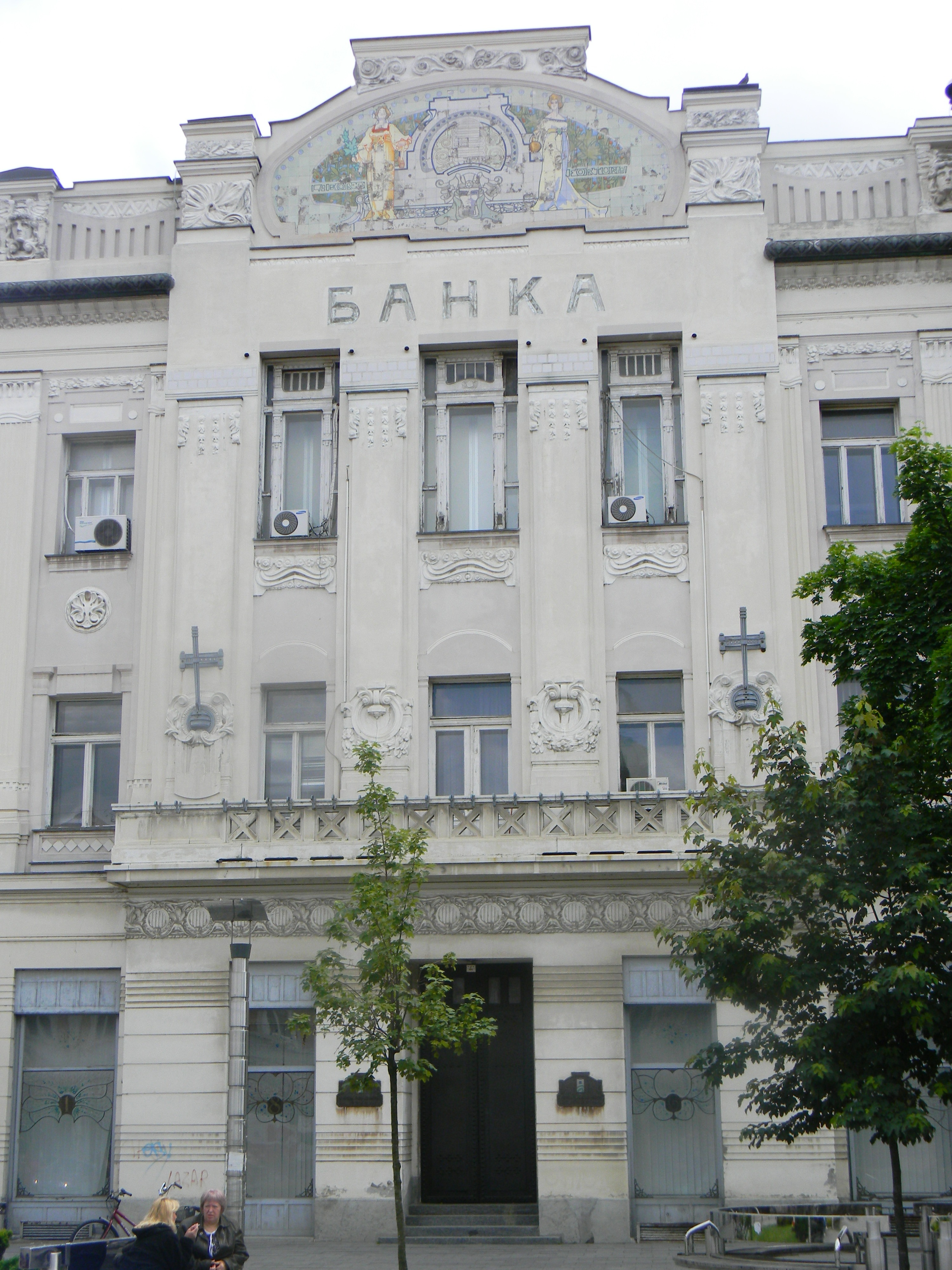
Pučka Bank in Pančevo by Albert Kálmán Kőrössy and Ullmann Gyula (1868)

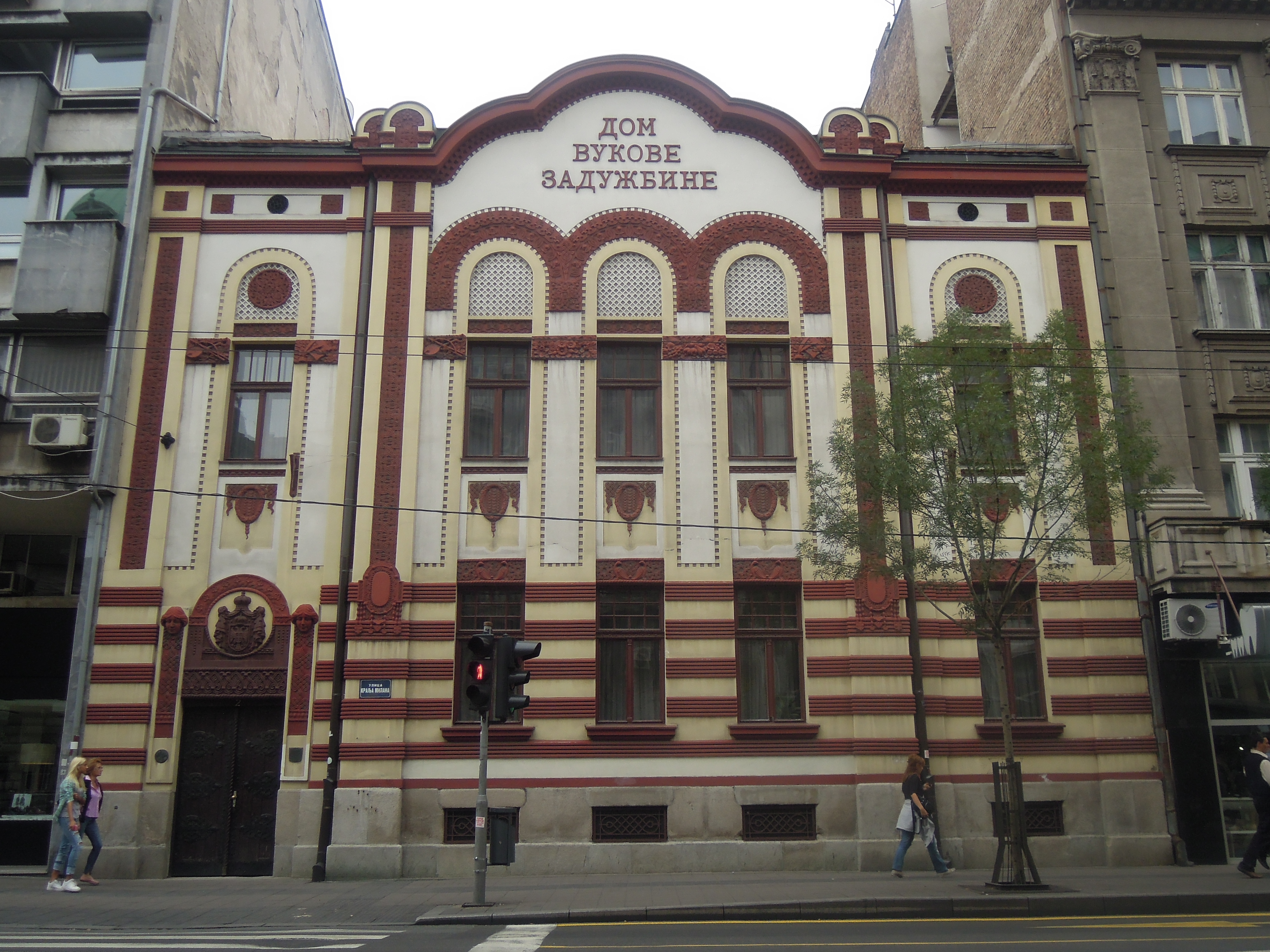
House of Vuk's Foundation in Belgrade by Aleksandar Bugarski (1879)

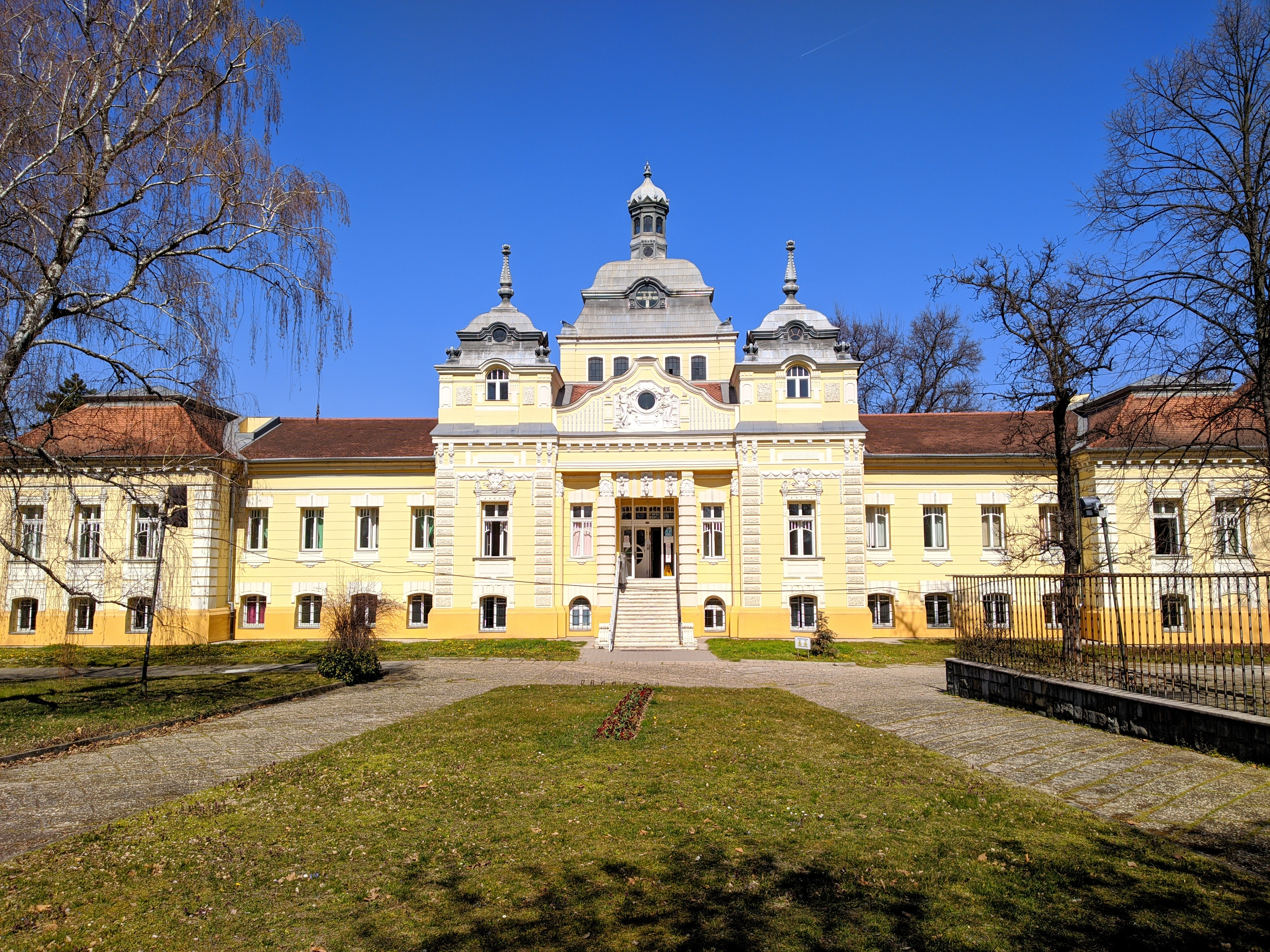
Iodine Spa in Novi Sad (1897)

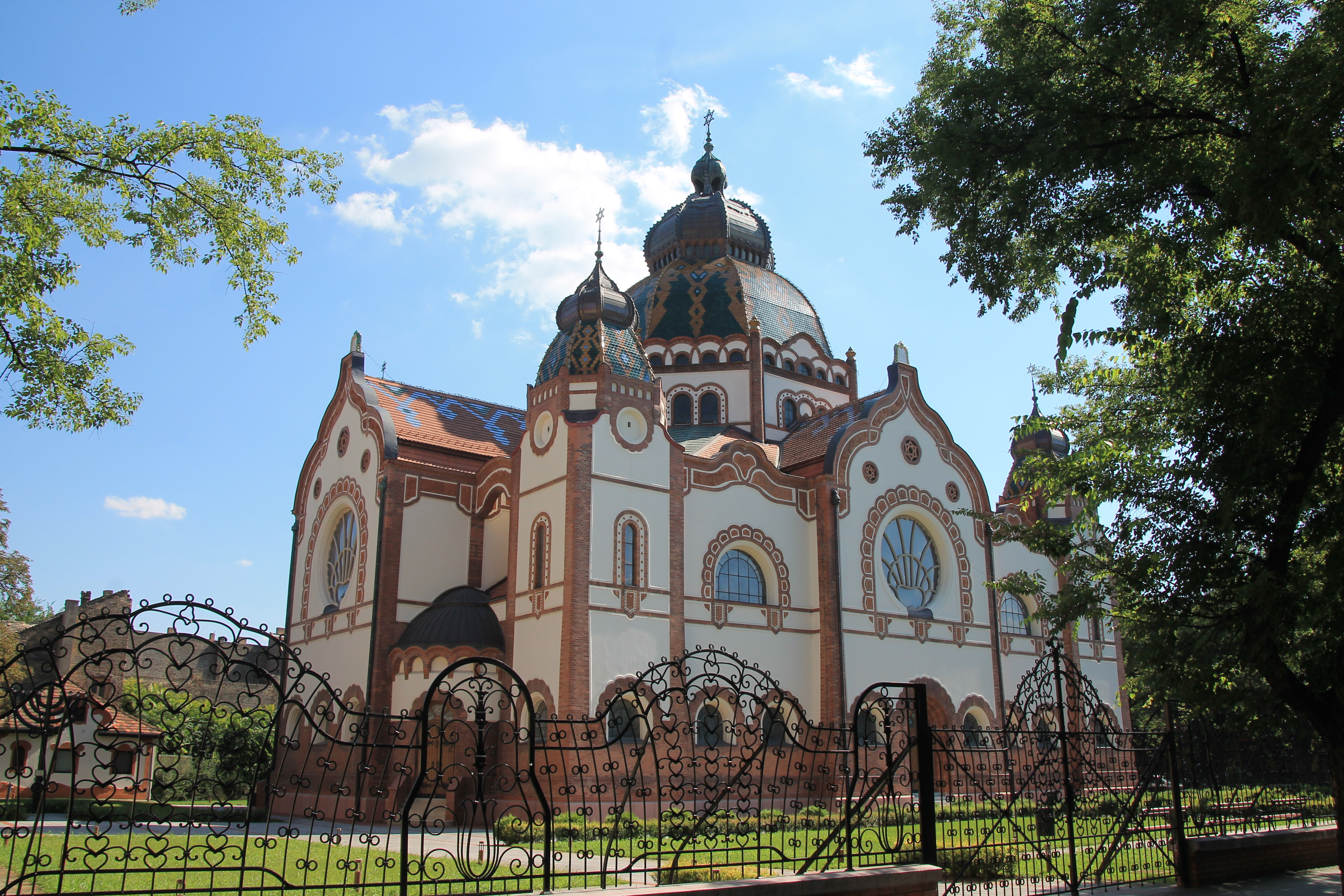
Subotica Synagogue by Marcell Komor and Dezső Jakab (1901)

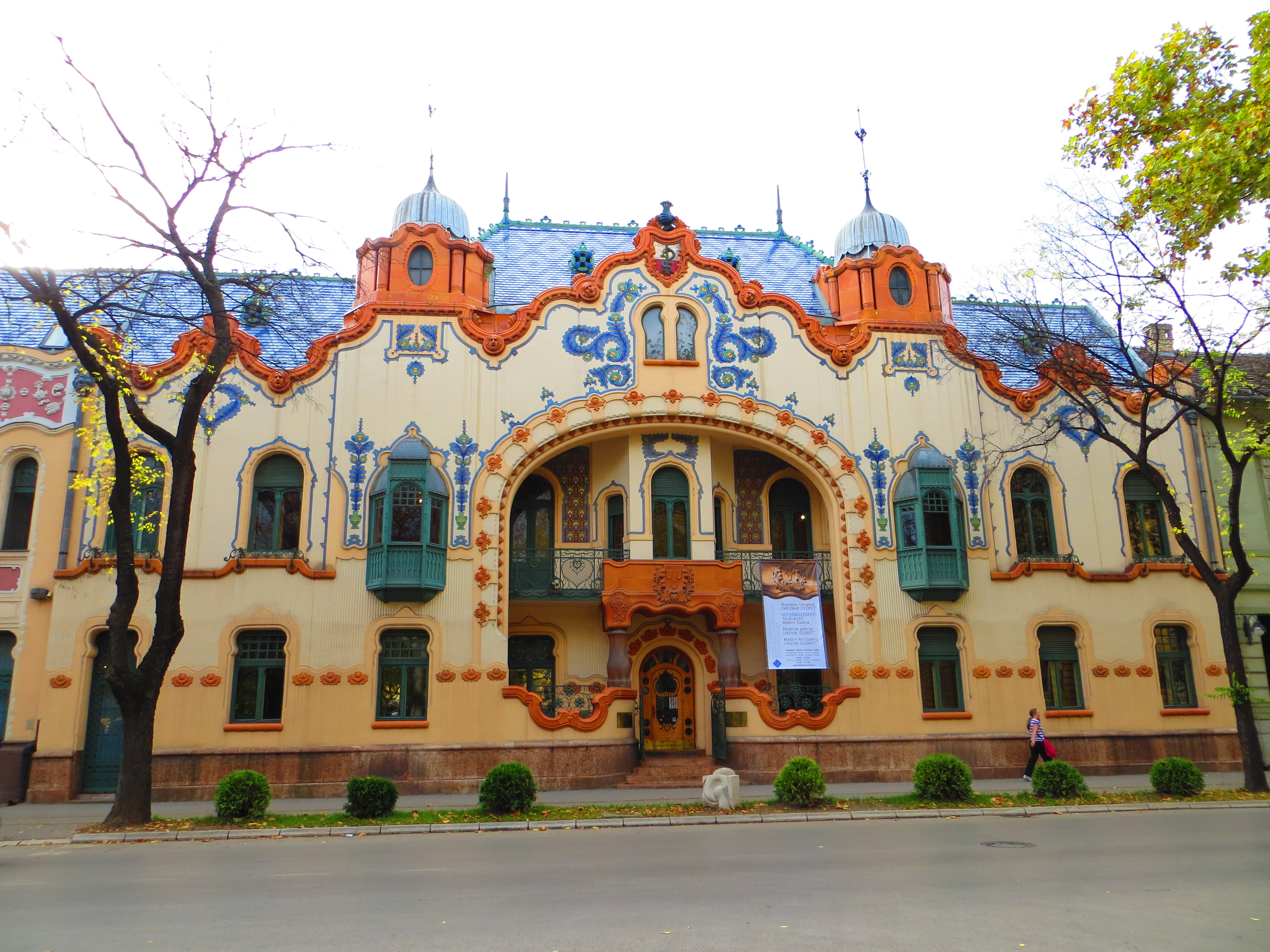
Raichle's Palace in Subotica (1904)

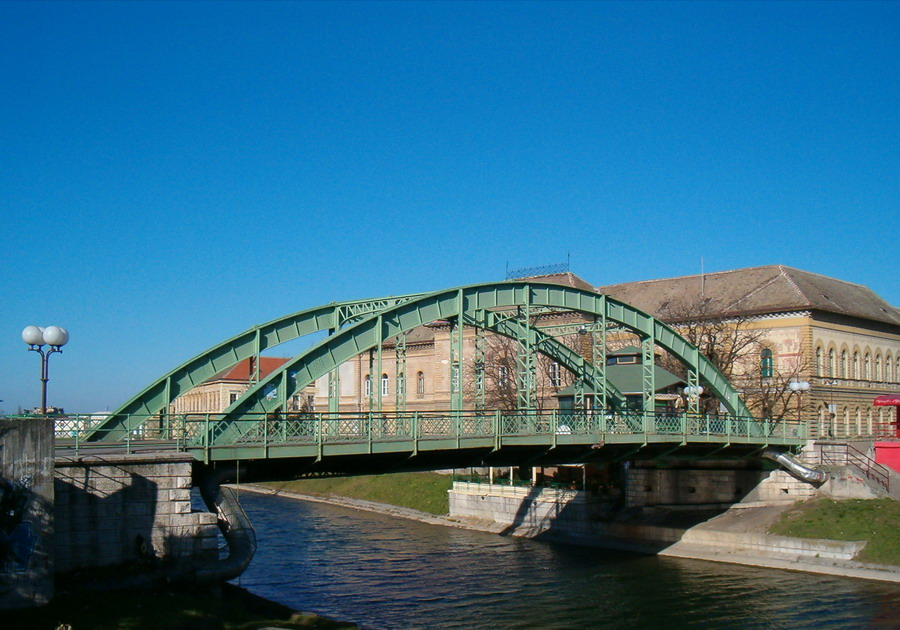
Karađorđević Bridge (previously named Franz Josef Bridge) in Zrenjanin (1904)

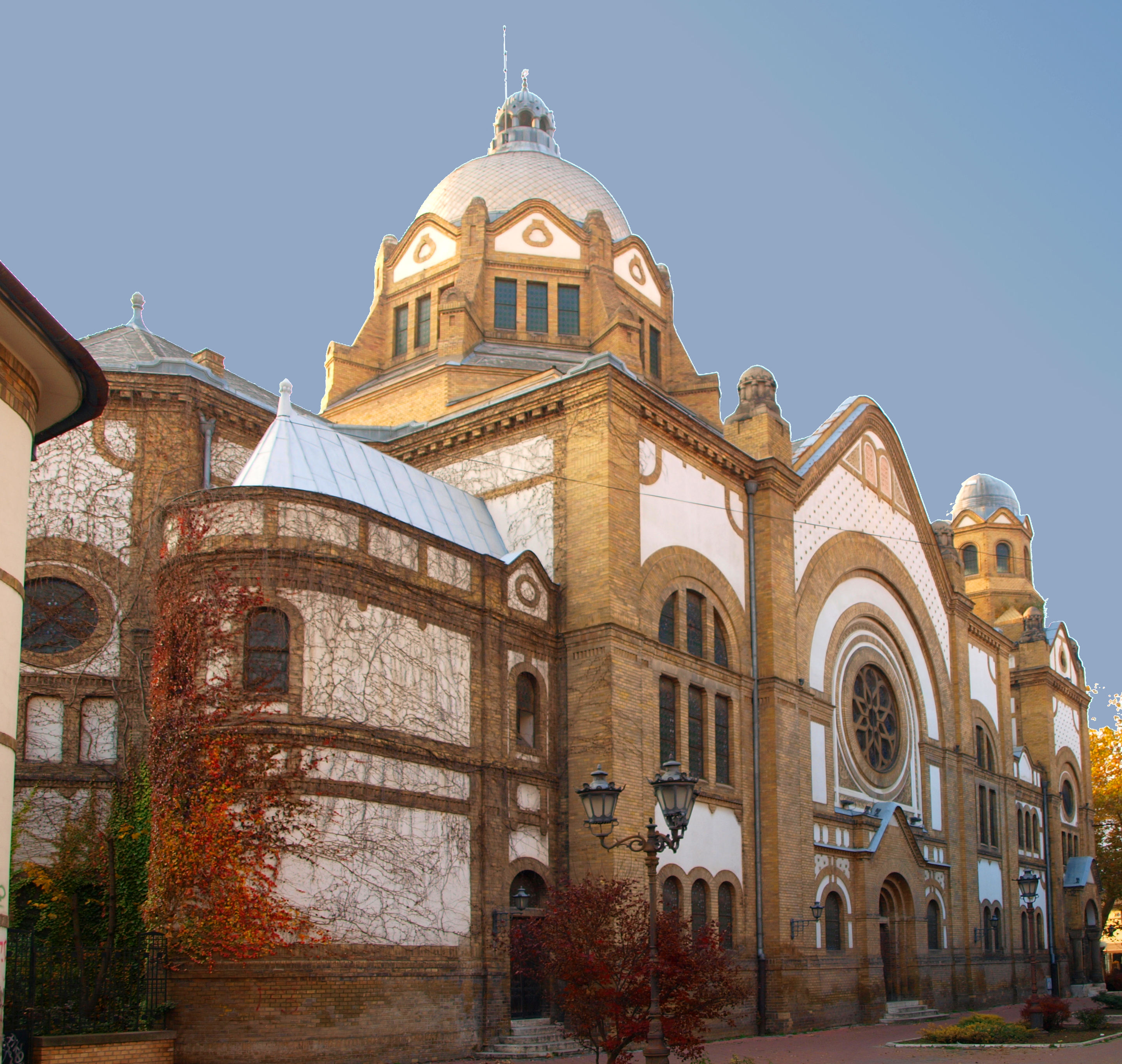
Novi Sad Synagogue by Lipót Baumhorn (1905)

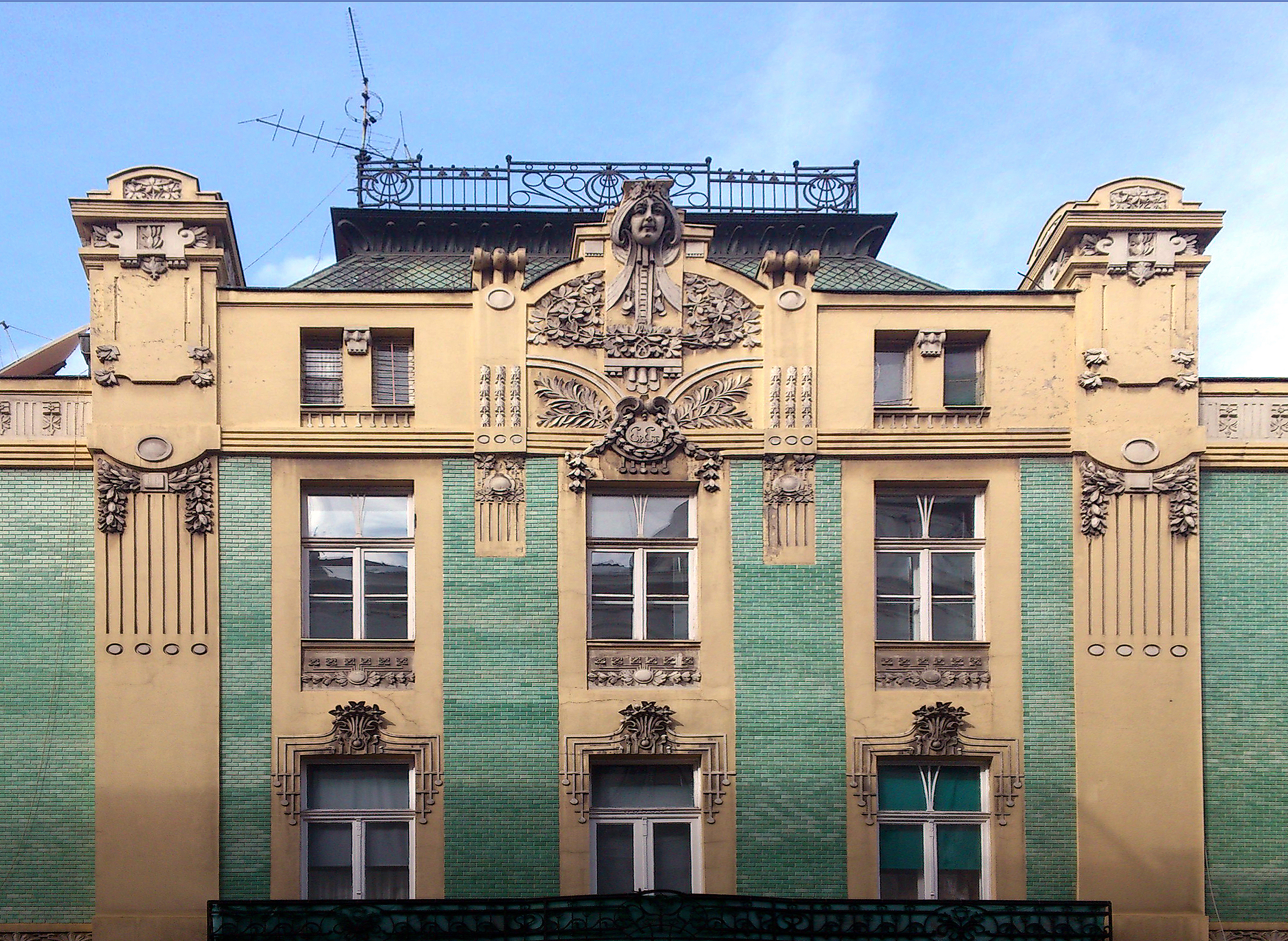
Building of Merchant Stamenković in Belgrade by Nikola Nestorović and Andra Stevanović (1907)

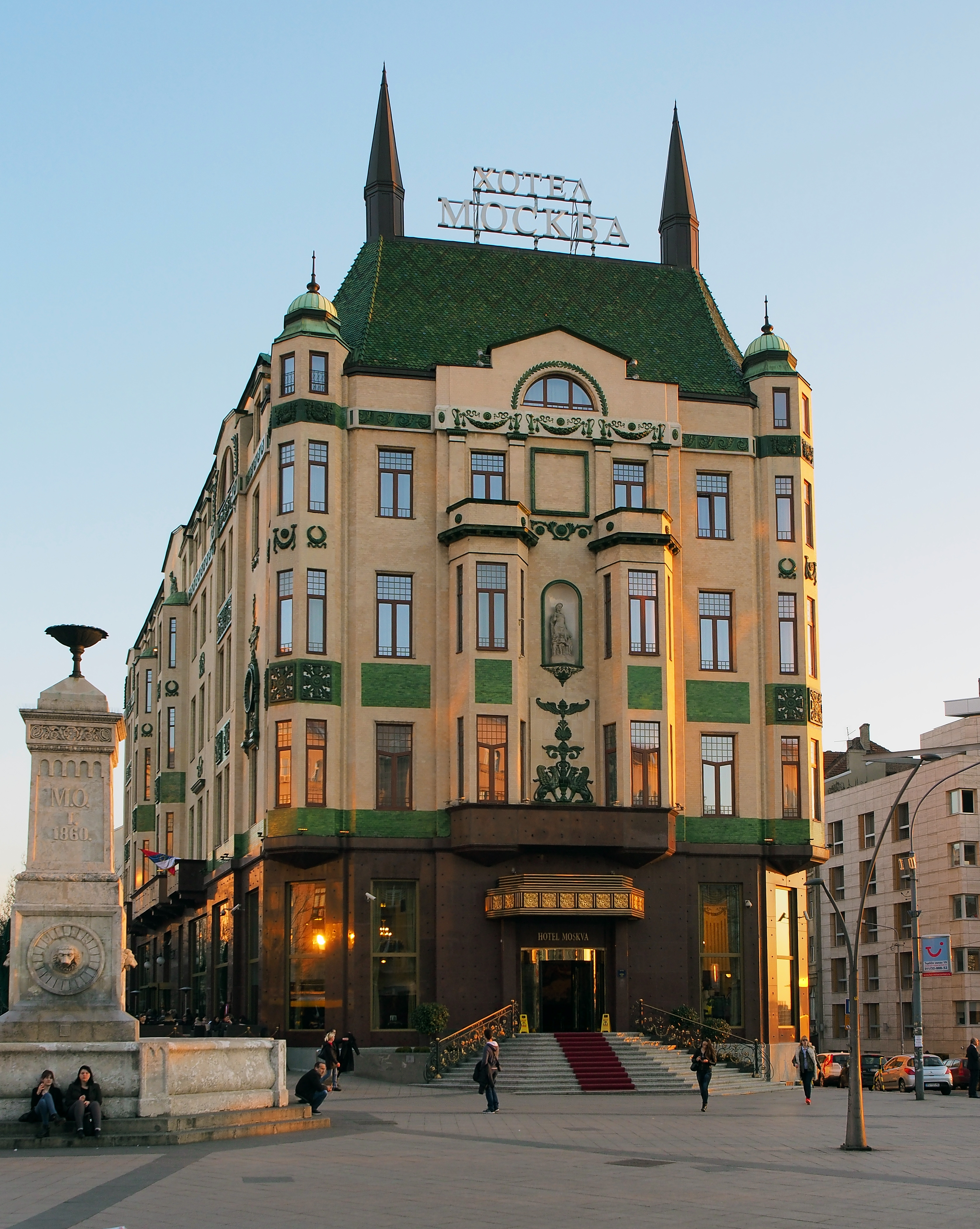
Hotel Moskva in Belgrade by Jovan Ilkić (1908)

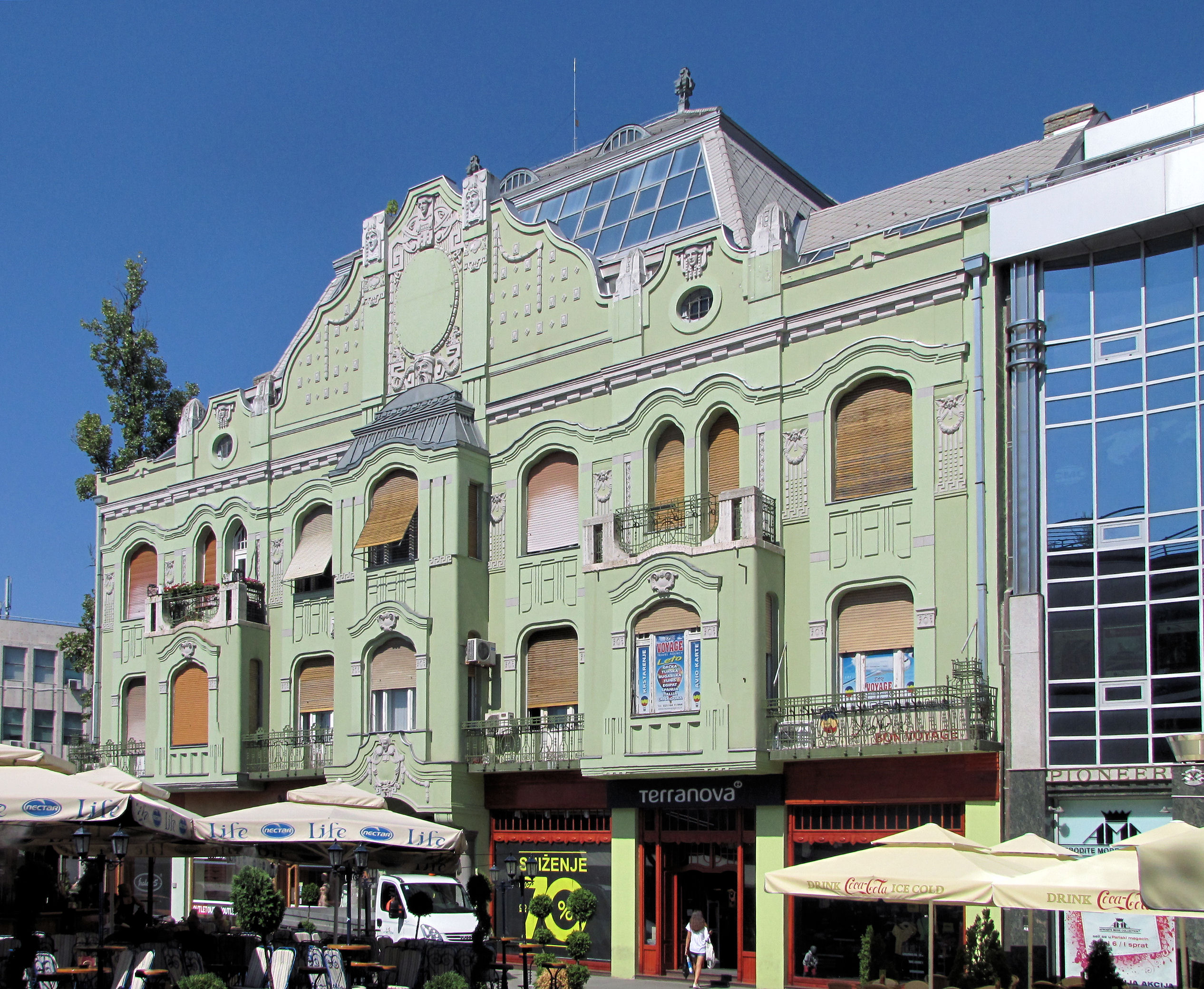
Menrat's Palace in Novi Sad by Lipót Baumhorn (1908)

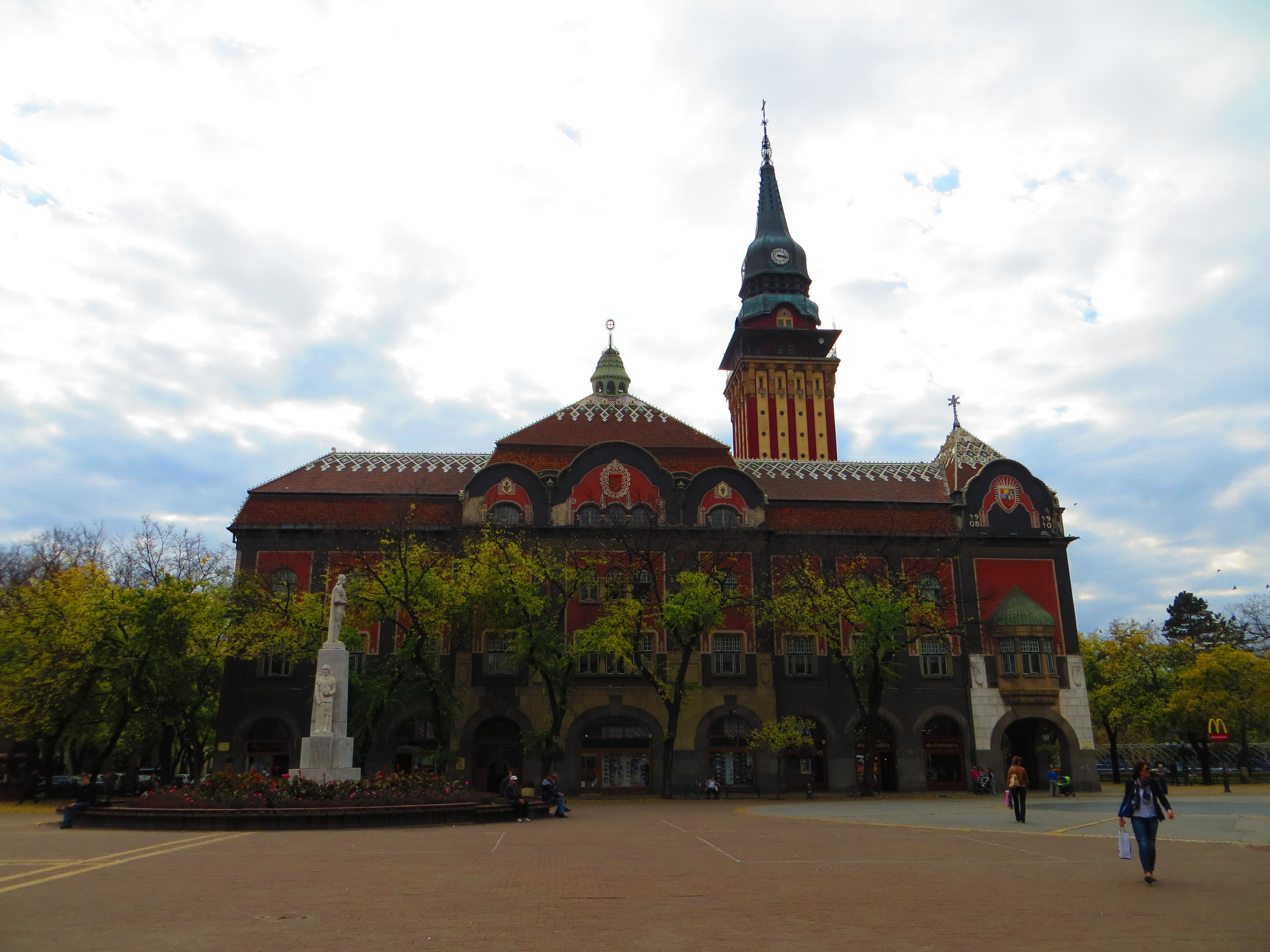
Subotica City Hall by Dezső Jakab (1910)

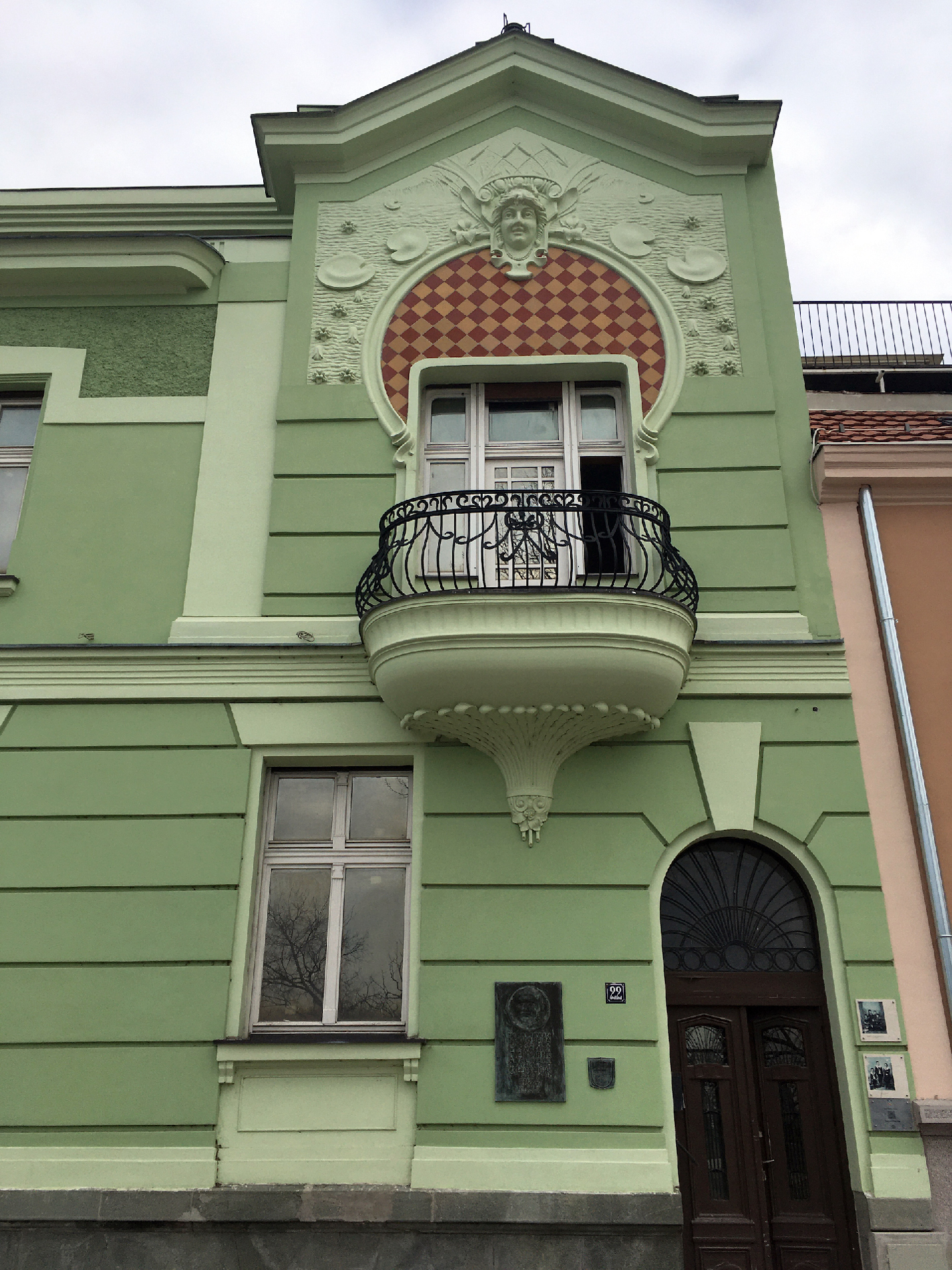
Mika Alas's House in Belgrade by Petar Bajalović (1910)

Due to the close proximity to Austria–Hungary and Vojvodina being part of the empire until 1918, both the Vienna Secession and Hungarian Szecesszió were prevalent movements in what is today's northern Serbia, as well as the Capital of Belgrade. Famous Austrian and Hungarian architects would design many buildings in Subotica, Novi Sad, Palić, Zrenjanin, Vrbas, Senta, and Kikinda. Art Nouveau heritage in Belgrade, Pančevo, Aranđelovac, and Vrnjačka Banja are a mixture of French, German, Austrian, Hungarian, and local Serbian movements. From the curvy floral beauty of the Subotica's Synagogue to the Morava-style inspired rosettes on Belgrade's telegraph building, Art Nouveau architecture takes various shapes in present-day Serbia.

In the early 1900s, north of the Sava and the Danube, resurgent Hungarian national sentiment infused the buildings in Subotica and Senta with local floral ethnic motifs, while in the tiny Kingdom of Serbia, national romantics like Branko Tanezević and Dragutin Inkiostiri-Medenjak (both born in the Austro-Hungarian Empire), translated Serbia's traditional motifs into marvellous buildings. Other architects, like Milan Antonović and Nikola Nestorović brought the then-fashionable sinuous lines and natural motifs to the homes and businesses of their wealthy patrons, so they could show off their worldliness and keeping up with the trends in Paris, Munich and Vienna.

=== Modernismo and Modernisme in Spain ===
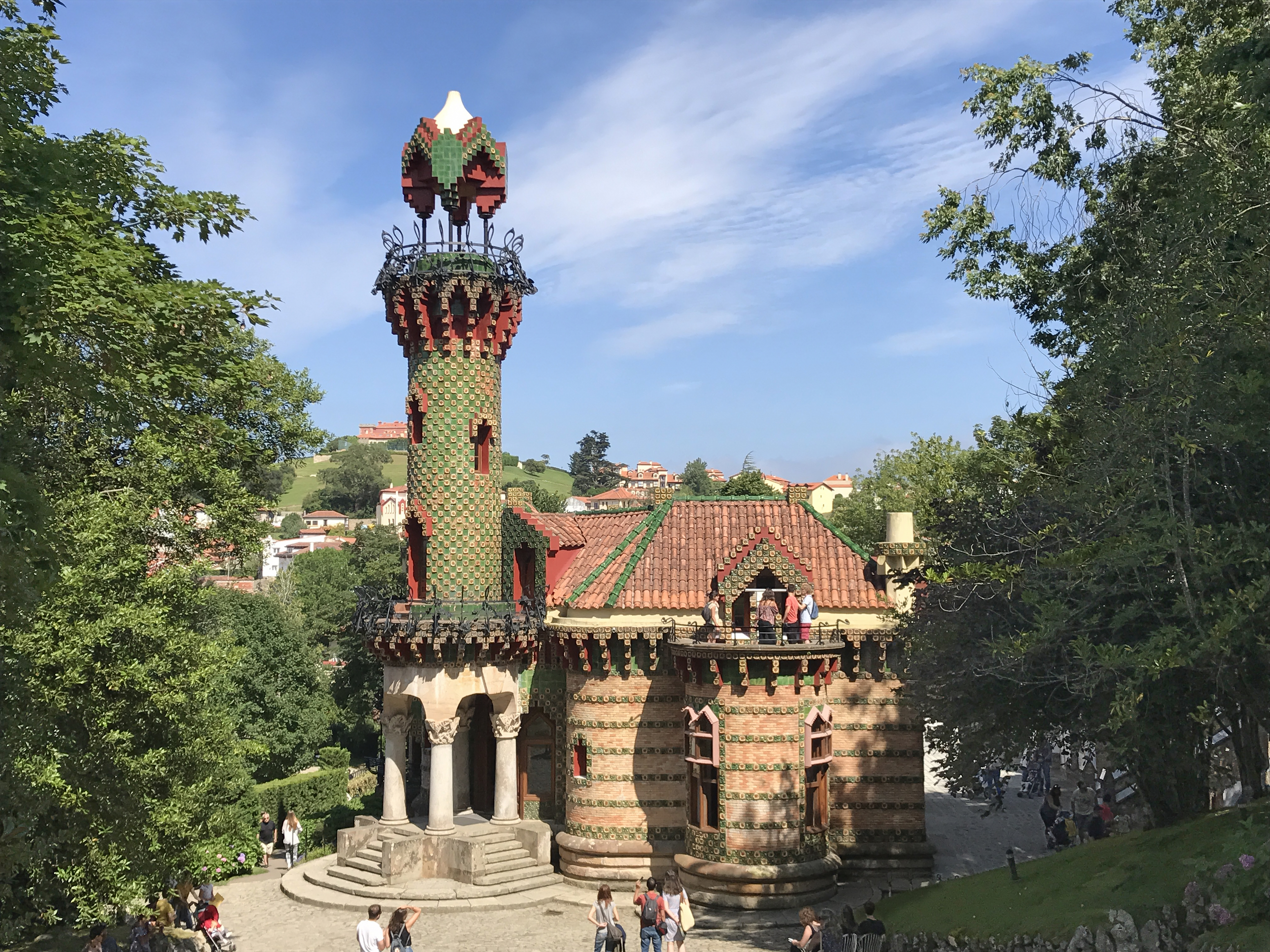
El Capricho de Gaudí in Comillas, Cantabria, by Antoni Gaudí (1883–1885)

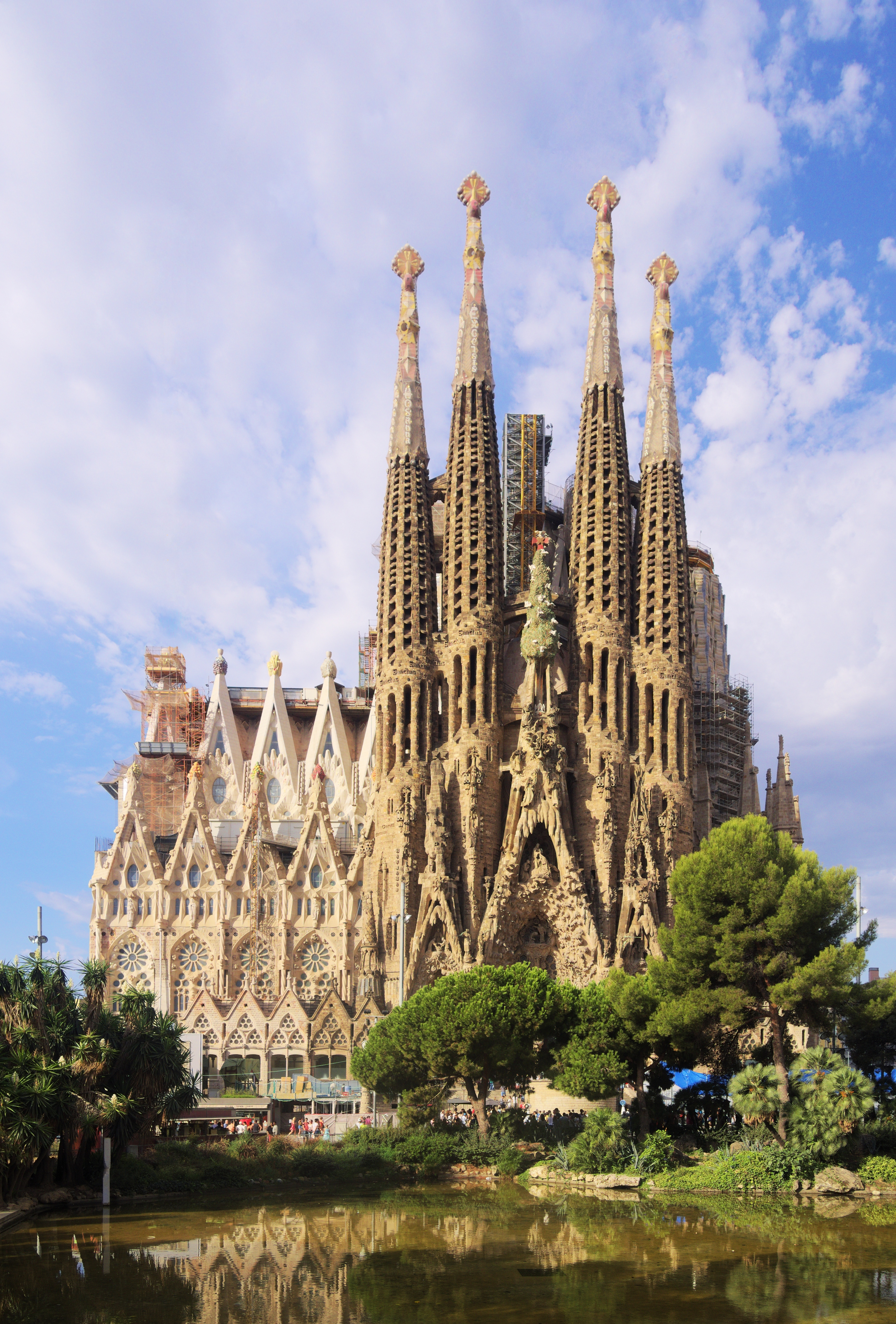
Sagrada Família basilica in Barcelona by Gaudí (1883–)

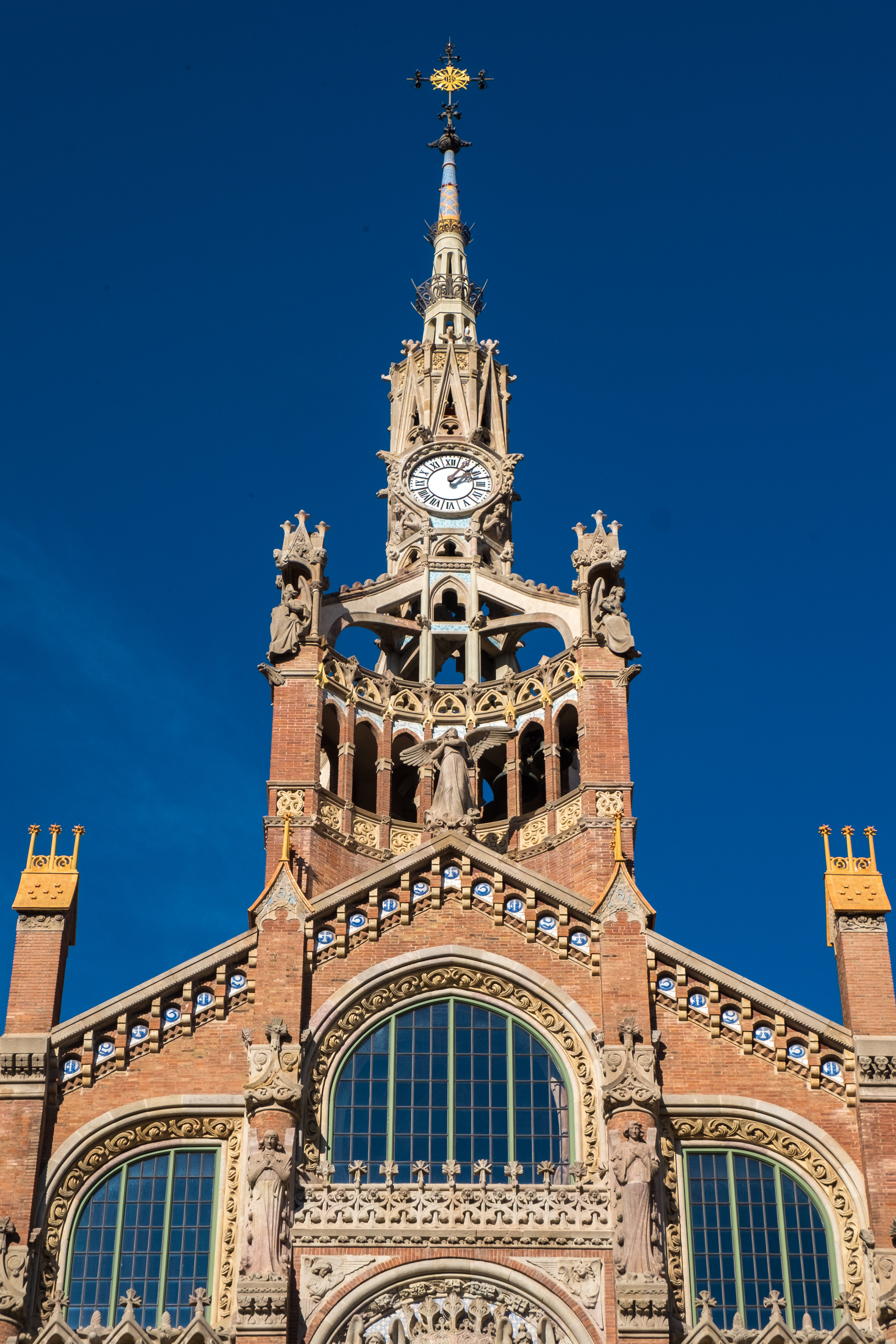
Hospital de Sant Pau by Lluis Domenech i Montaner (1901–1930)

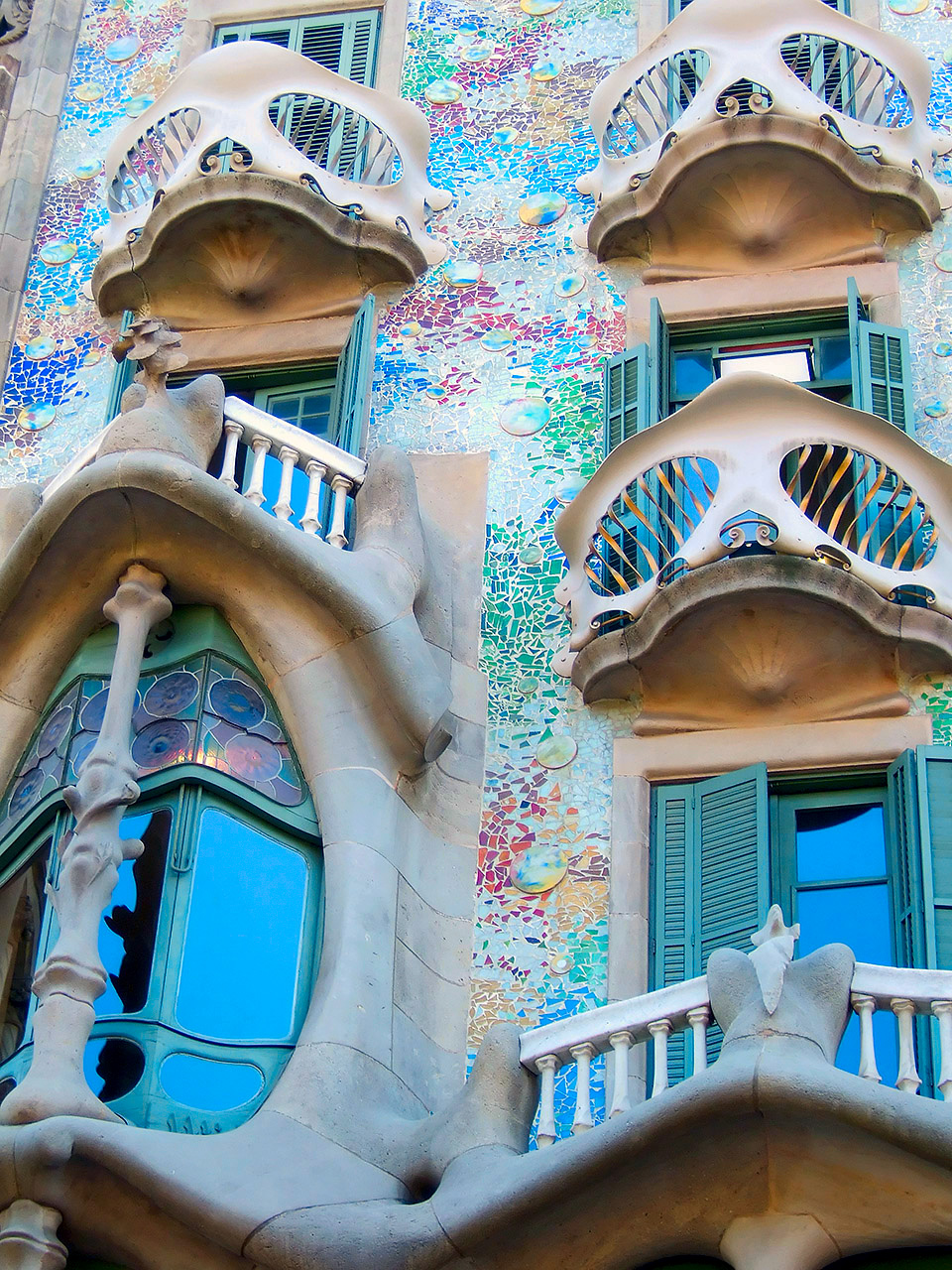
Trencadís façade of Casa Batlló in Barcelona by Gaudí and Josep Maria Jujol (1904–1906)

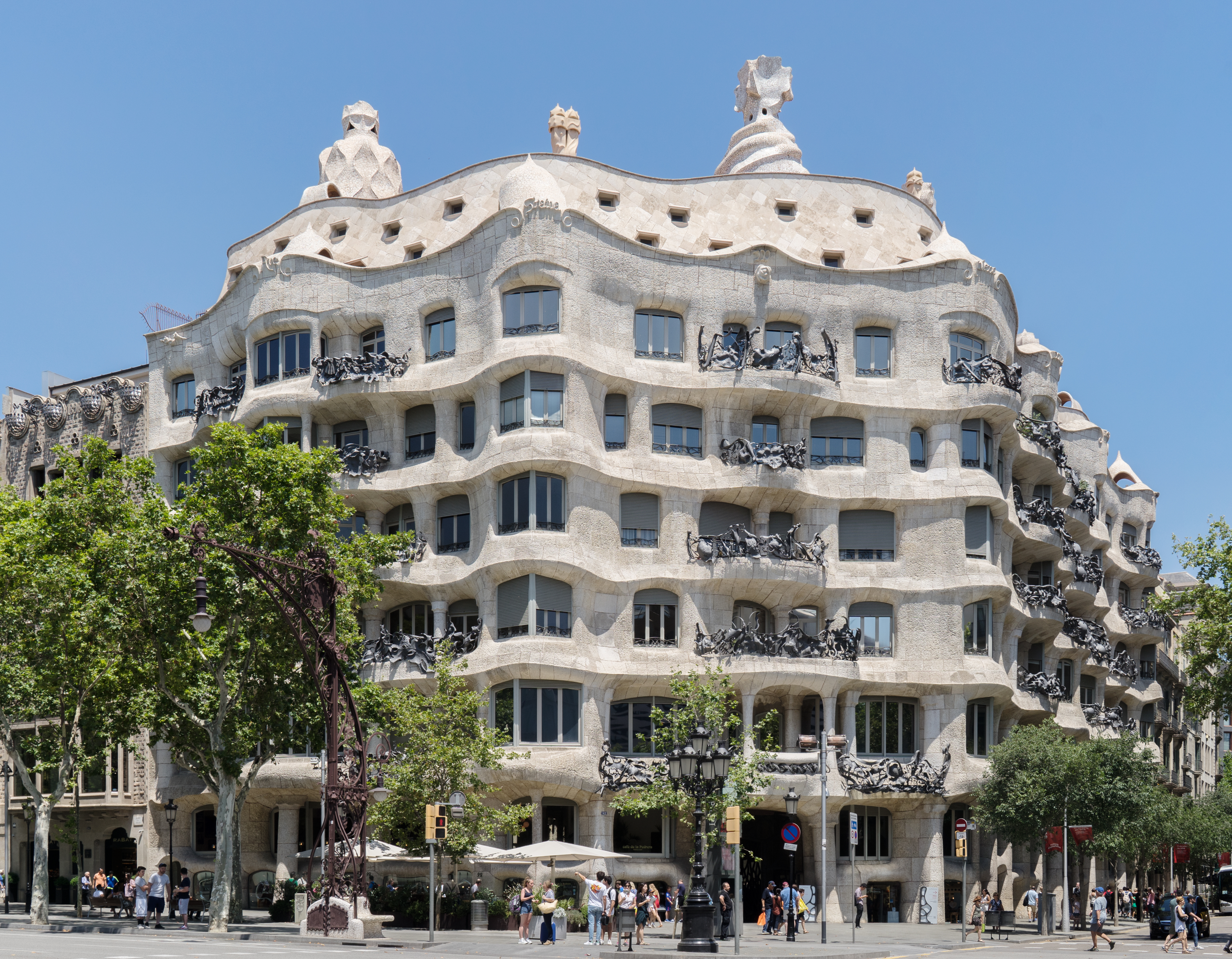
Casa Milà in Barcelona by Gaudí (1906–1912)

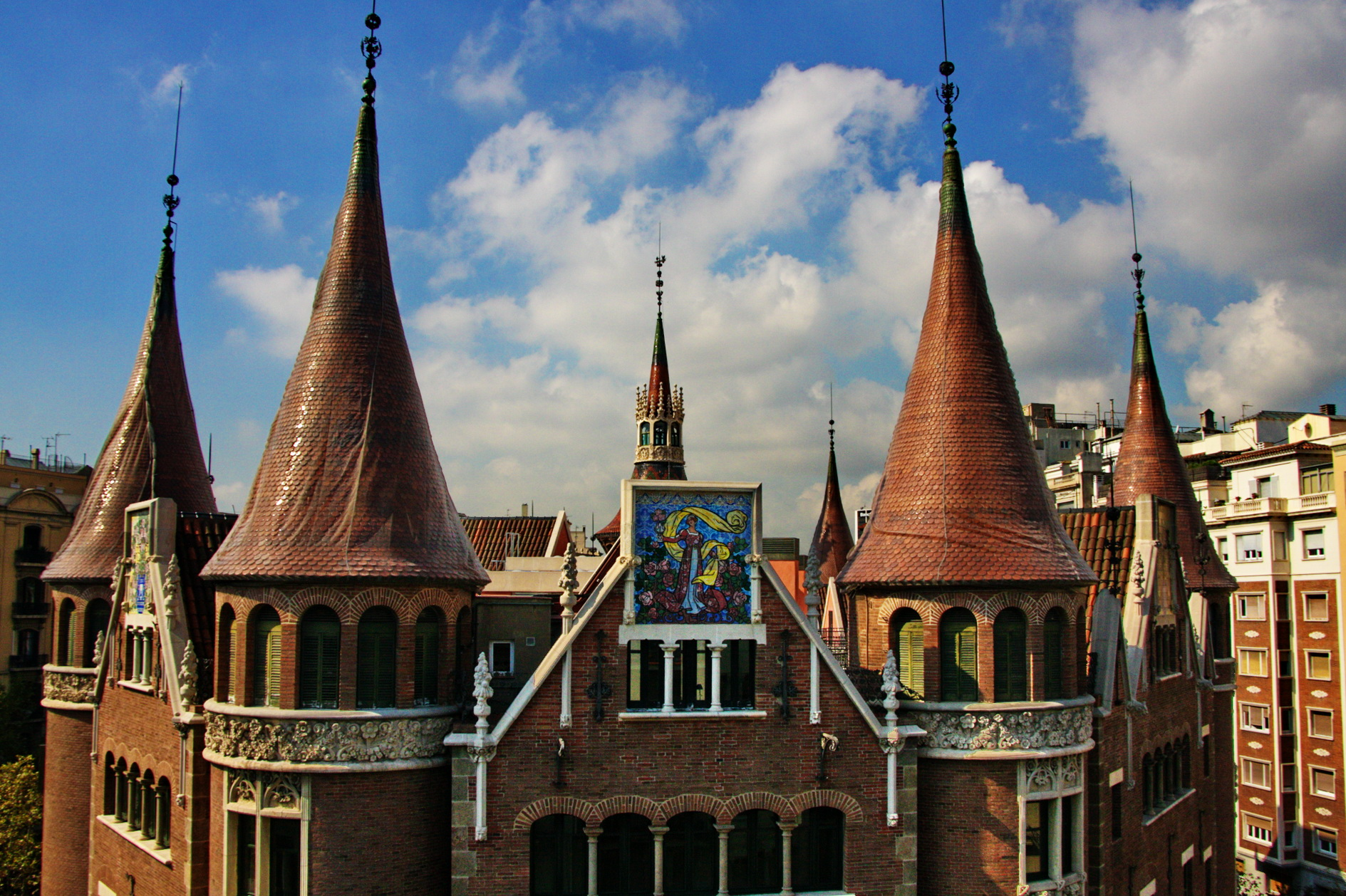
Casa de les Punxes in Barcelona by Josep Puig i Cadafalch (1905)

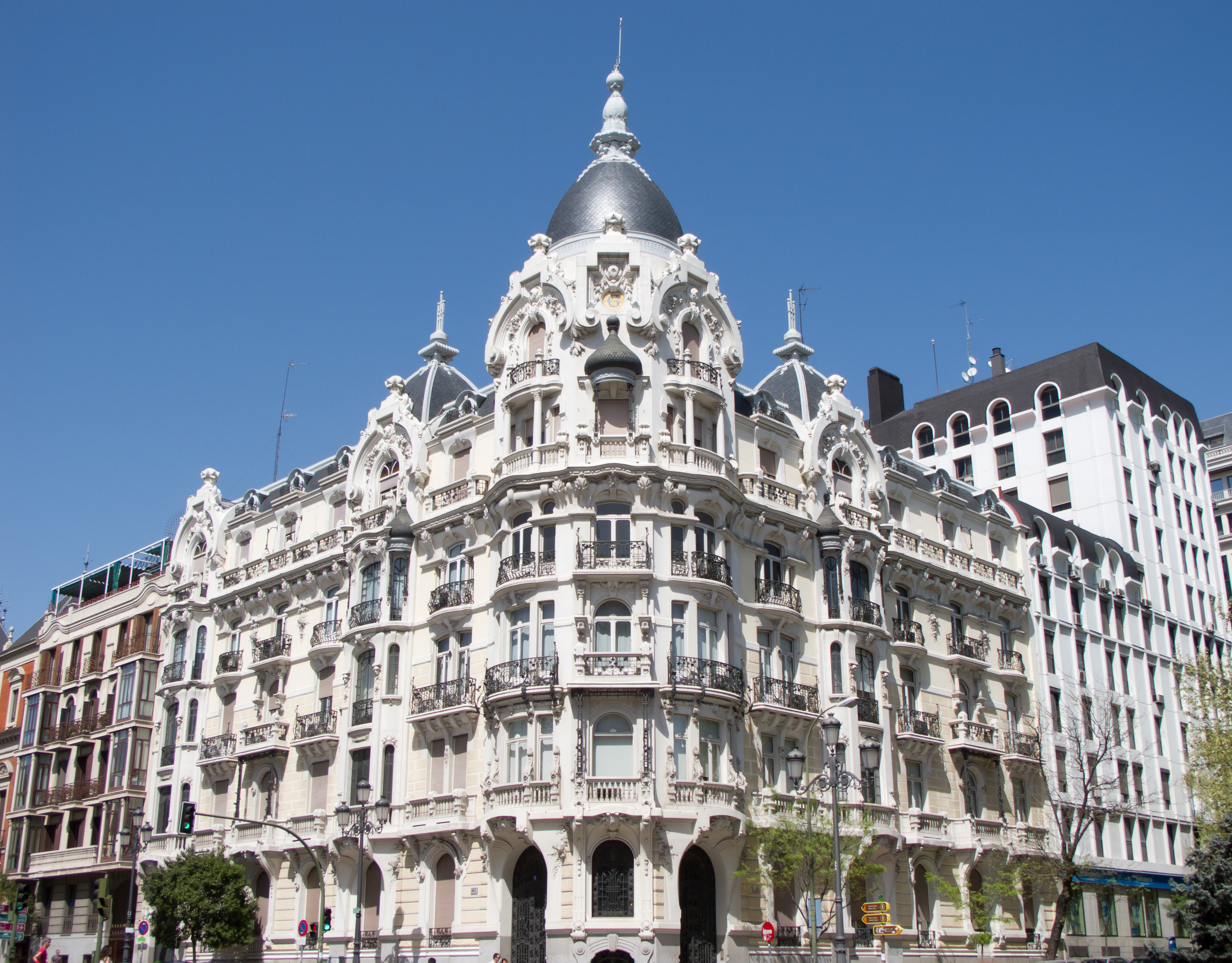
Casa Gallardo in Madrid by Federico Arias Rey (1911–1914)

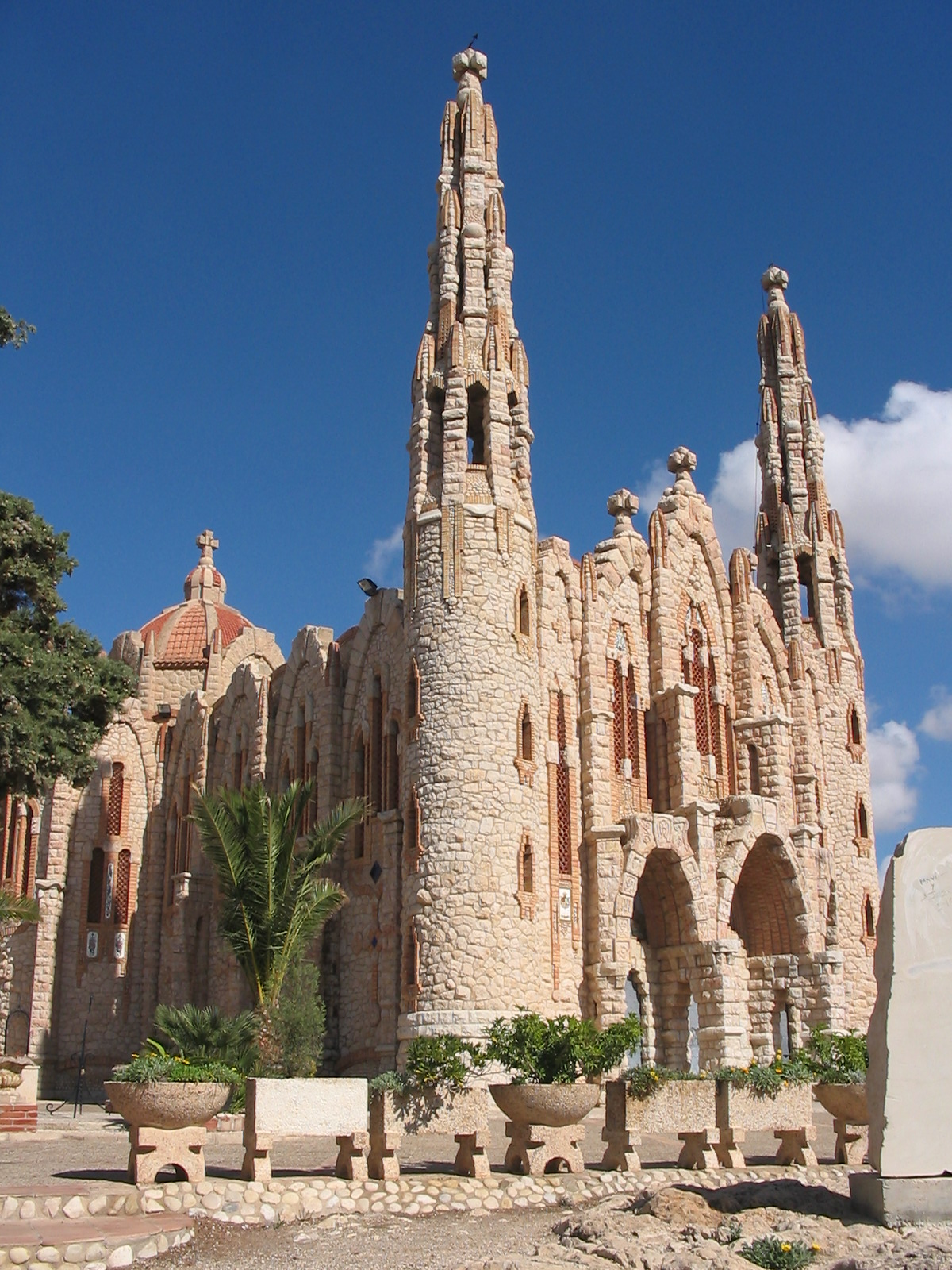
Sanctuary of Maria Magdalena in Novelda, Valencian Community (1918–1946)

A highly original variant of the style emerged in Barcelona, Catalonia, at about the same time that the Art Nouveau style appeared in Belgium and France. It was called Modernisme in Catalan and Modernismo in Spanish. Its most famous creator was Antoni Gaudí. Gaudí used floral and organic forms in a very novel way in Palau Güell (1886–1890). He integrated crafts as ceramics, stained glass, wrought ironwork forging and carpentry into his architecture. In his Güell Pavilions (1884–1887) and then Parc Güell (1900–1914) he also used a new technique called trencadís, which used waste ceramic pieces. His designs from about 1903, the Casa Batlló (1904–1906) and Casa Milà (1906–1912), are most closely related to the stylistic elements of Art Nouveau. Later structures such as Sagrada Família combined Art Nouveau elements with revivalist Neo-Gothic. Casa Batlló, Casa Milà, Güell Pavilions, and Parc Güell were results of his collaboration with Josep Maria Jujol, who himself created houses in Sant Joan Despí (1913–1926), several churches near Tarragona (1918 and 1926) and the sinuous Casa Planells (1924) in Barcelona.

Besides the dominating presence of Gaudí, Lluís Domènech i Montaner also used Art Nouveau in Barcelona in buildings such as the Castell dels Tres Dragons (1888), Casa Lleó Morera, Palau de la Música Catalana (1905) and Hospital de Sant Pau (1901–1930). The two latter buildings have been listed by UNESCO as World Cultural Heritage.

Another major modernista was Josep Puig i Cadafalch, who designed the Casa Martí and its Els Quatre Gats café, the Casimir Casaramona textile factory (now the CaixaFòrum art museum), Casa Macaya, Casa Amatller, the Palau del Baró de Quadras (housing Casa Àsia for 10 years until 2013) and the Casa de les Punxes ('House of Spikes').

A distinctive Art Nouveau movement was also in the Valencian Community. Some of the notable architects were Demetrio Ribes Marco, Vicente Pascual Pastor, Timoteo Briet Montaud, and José María Manuel Cortina Pérez. Valencian Art Nouveau defining characteristics are a notable use of ceramics in decoration, both in the façade and in ornamentation, and also the use of Valencian regional motives.

Another remarkable variant is the Madrilenian Art Nouveau or Modernismo madrileño, with such notable buildings as the Longoria Palace, the Casino de Madrid or the Cementerio de la Almudena, among others. Renowned modernistas from Madrid were architects José López Sallaberry, Fernando Arbós y Tremanti and Francisco Andrés Octavio.

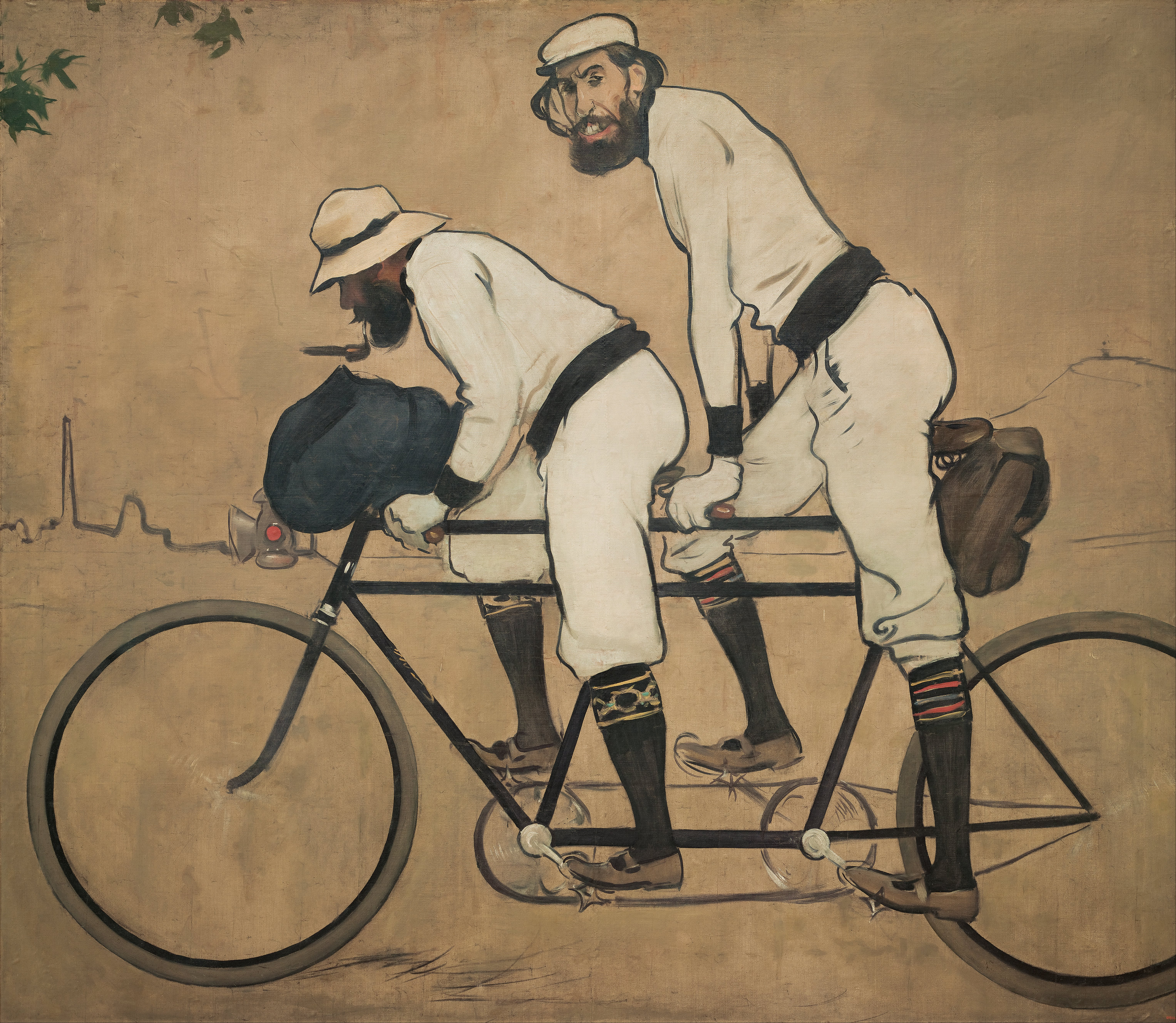
Ramon Casas and Pere Romeu on a Tandem by Ramon Casas (1897)

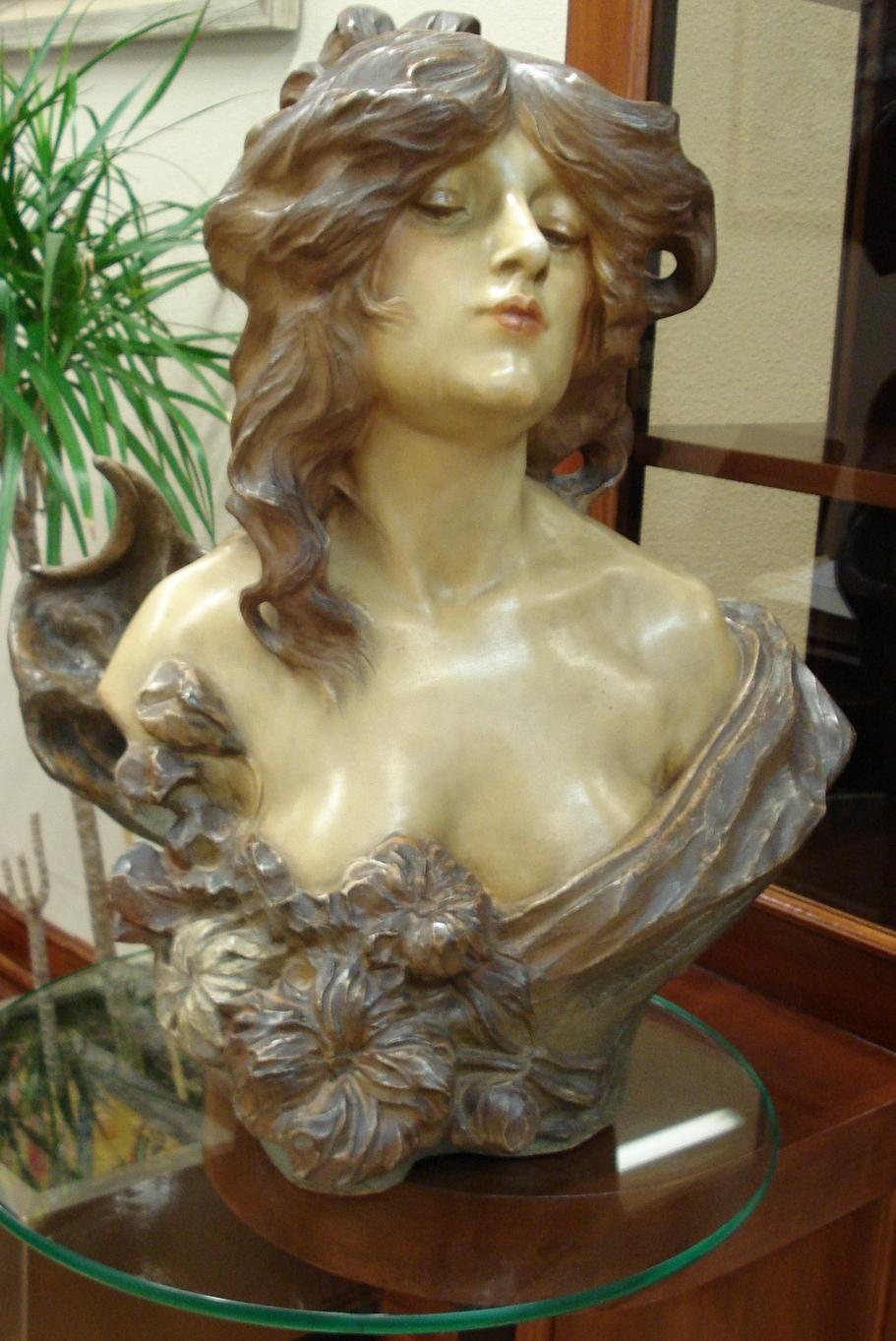
Sculpture of polychrome terracota by Lambert Escaler (1902)

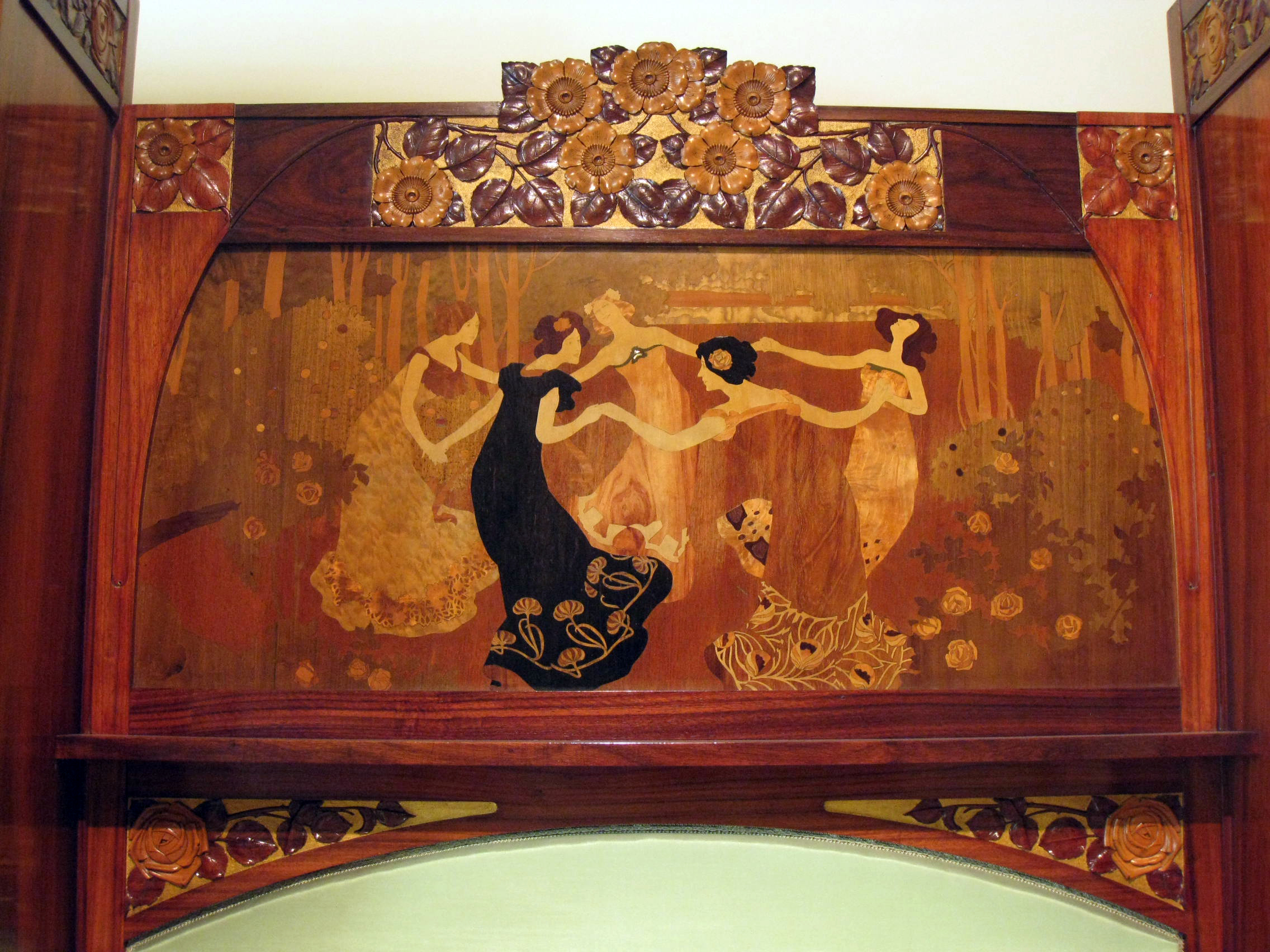
Furniture by Gaspar Homar (1903)

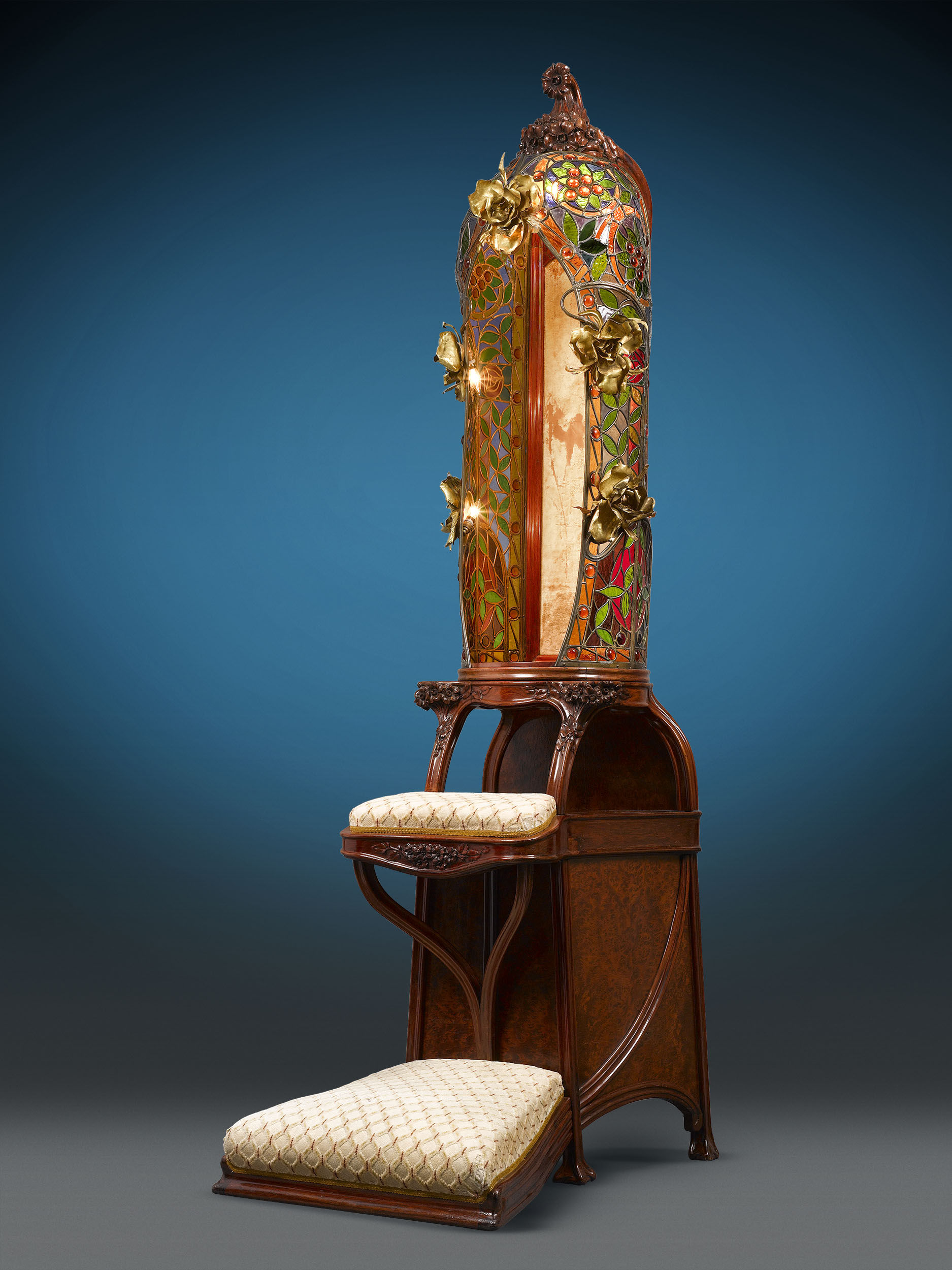
Prie Dieu, or prayer desk, designed by Antoni Gaudí for Casa Batlló (1904–1906)

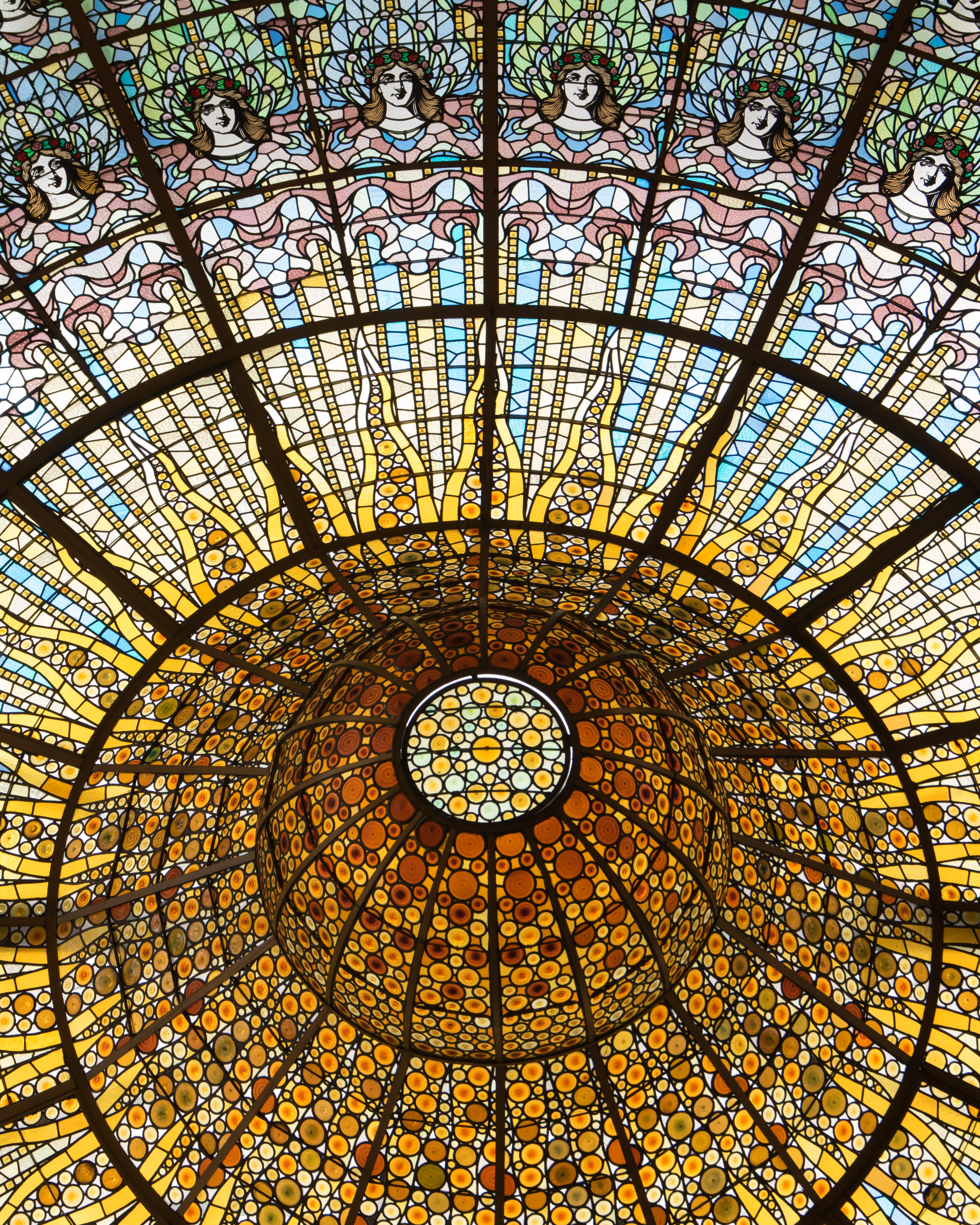
Stained glass ceiling of Palau de la Música Catalana by Antoni Rigalt (1905–1908)

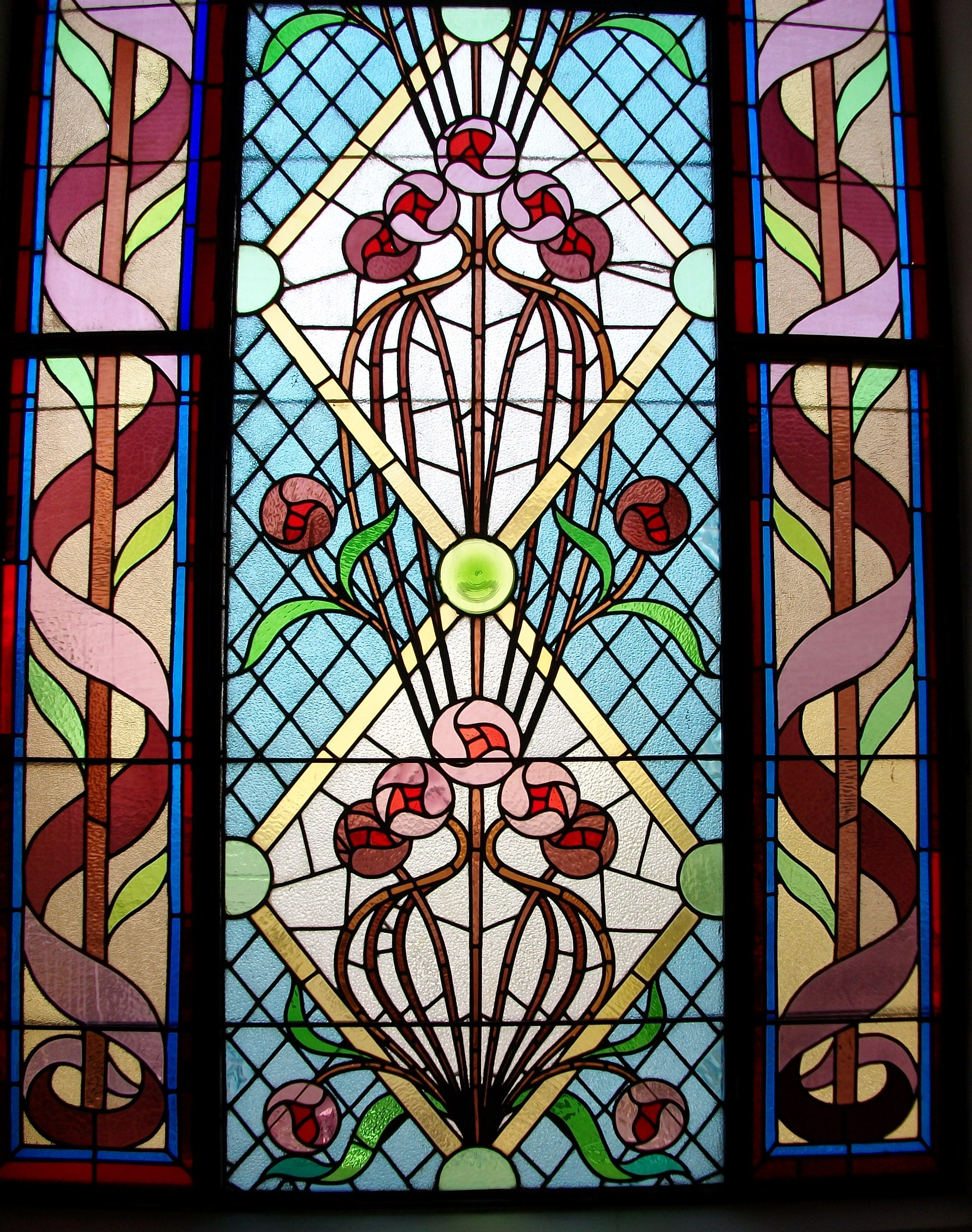
Window of the Palace of the Valencian Regional Exposition, in Valencia (1908)

The Modernisme movement left a wide art heritage including drawings, paintings, sculptures, glass and metal work, mosaics, ceramics, and furniture. A part of it can be found in Museu Nacional d'Art de Catalunya.

Inspired by a Paris café called Le Chat Noir, where he had previously worked, Pere Romeu i Borràs decided to open a café in Barcelona that was named Els Quatre Gats (Four Cats in Catalan). The café became a central meeting point for Barcelona's most prominent figures of Modernisme, such as Pablo Picasso and Ramon Casas i Carbó who helped to promote the movement by his posters and postcards. For the café he created a picture called Ramon Casas and Pere Romeu on a Tandem that was replaced with his another composition entitled Ramon Casas and Pere Romeu in an Automobile in 1901, symbolizing the new century.

Antoni Gaudí designed furniture for many of the houses he built; one example is an armchair called the for the Battle House. He influenced another notable Catalan furniture designer, Gaspar Homar (1870–1953) who often combined marquetry and mosaics with his furnishings.

=== Arte Nova in Portugal ===
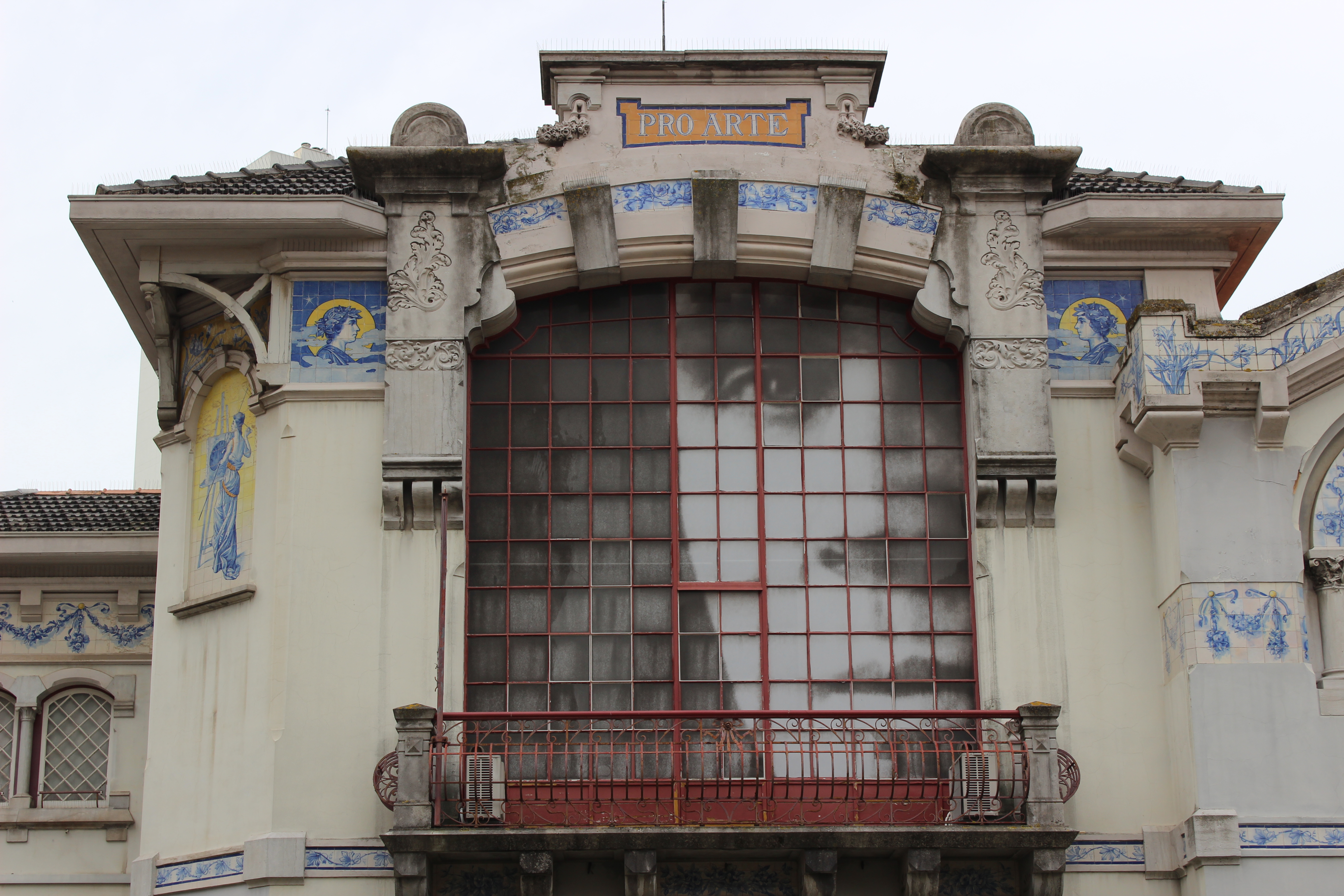
Museum-Residence Dr. Anastácio Gonçalves in Lisbon (1904–05)

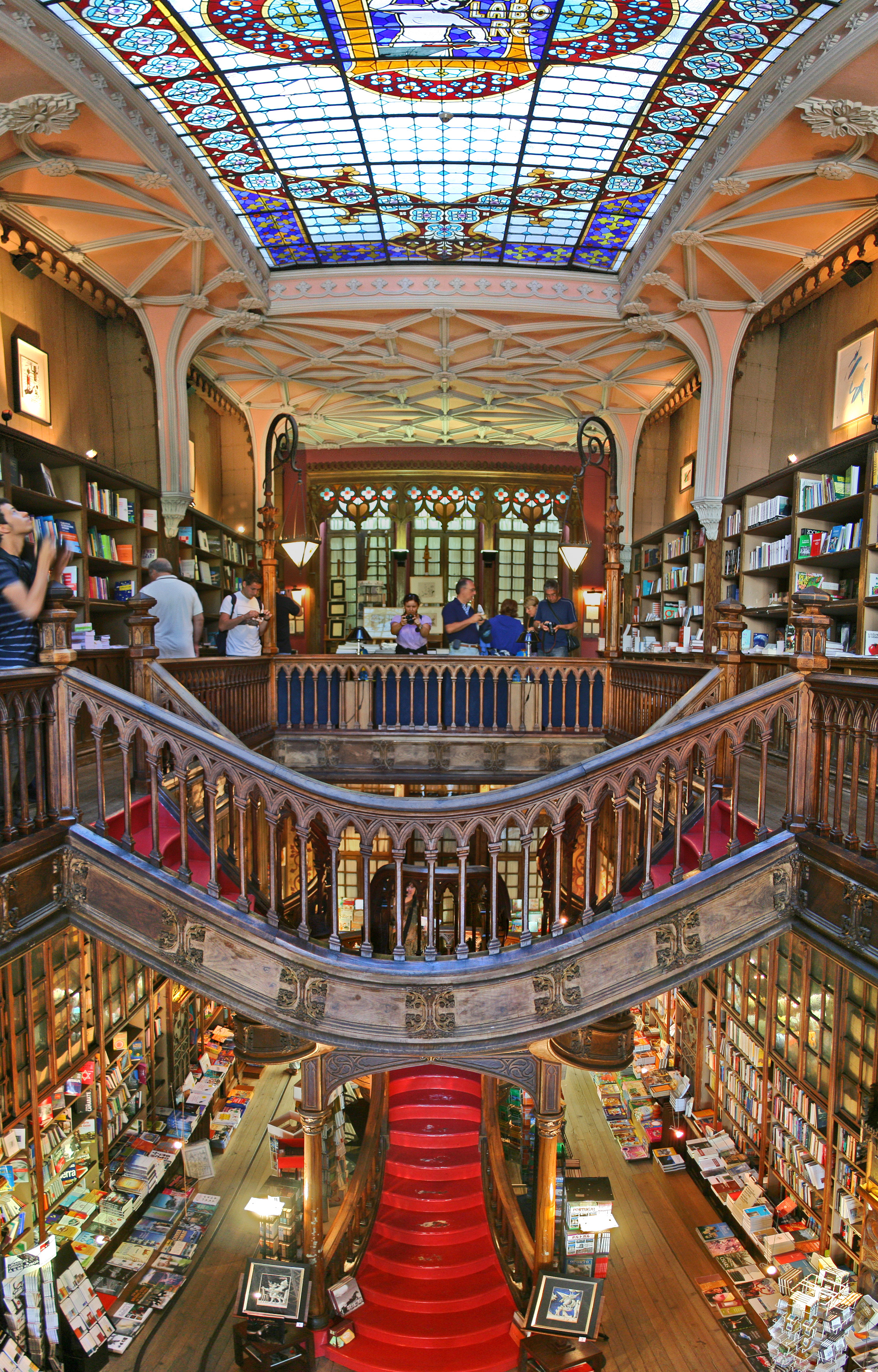
Livraria Lello bookstore in Porto (1906)

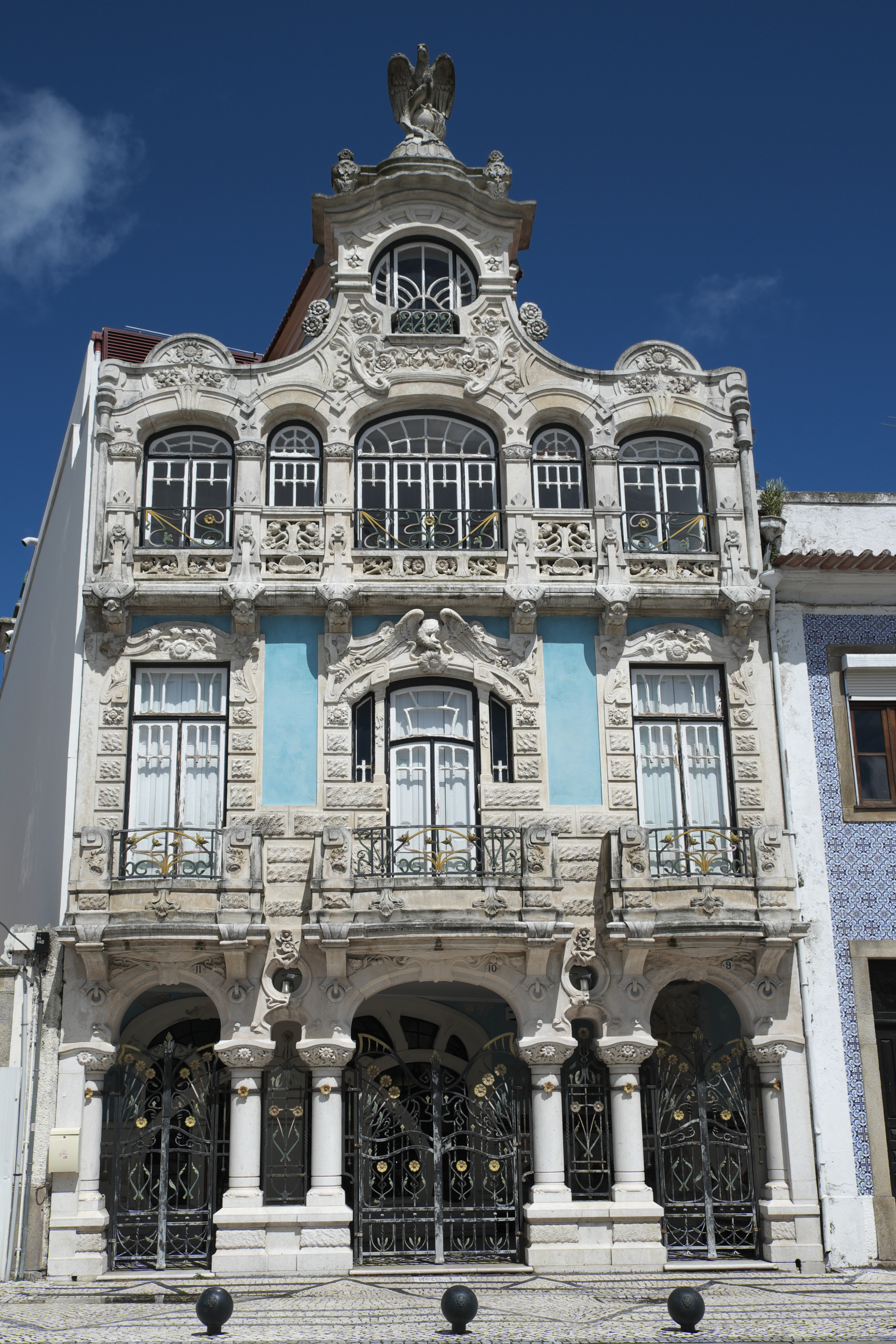
Façade of Major Pessoa Residence in Aveiro (1907–1909)

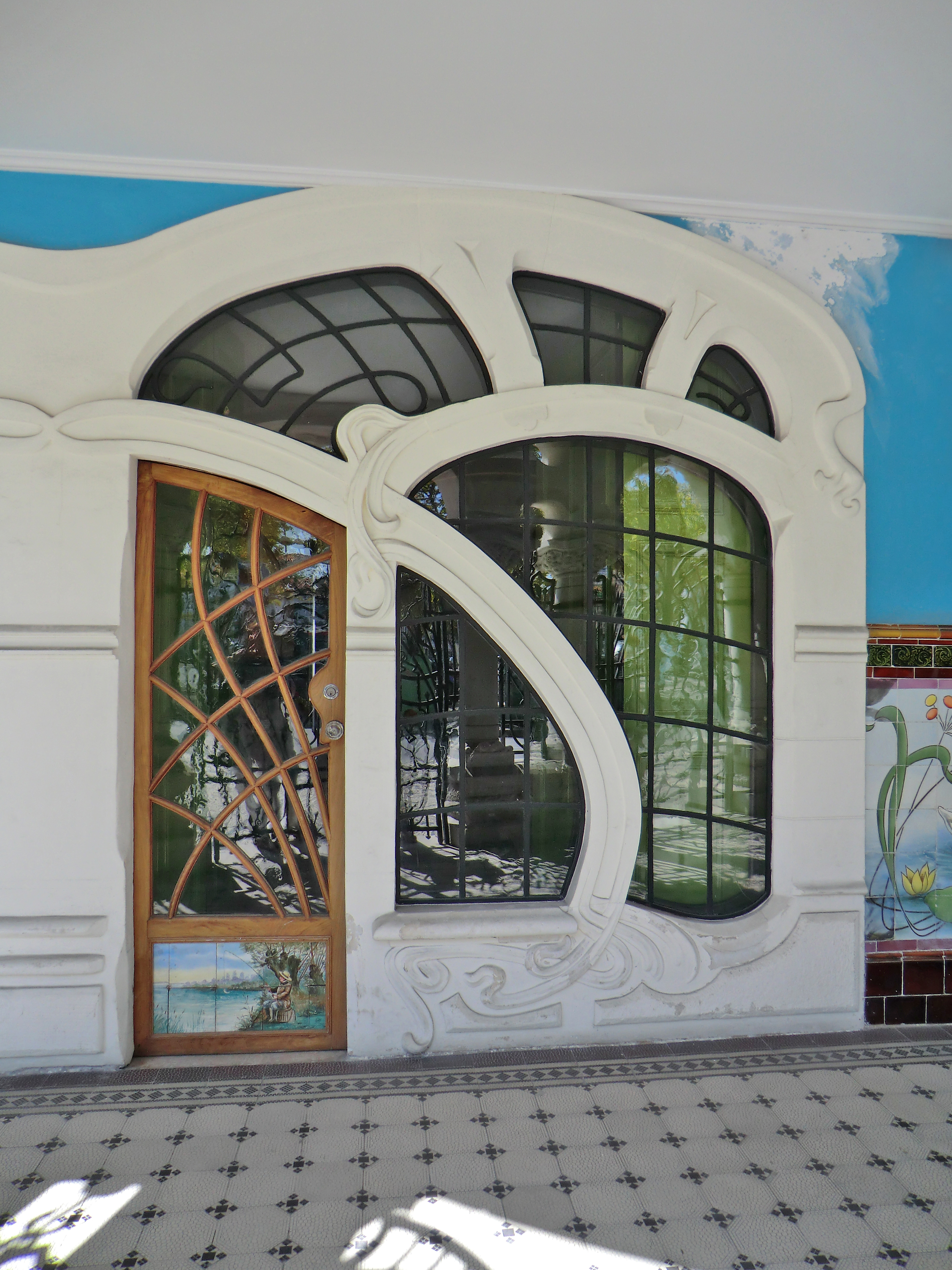
Atrium of Major Pessoa Residence

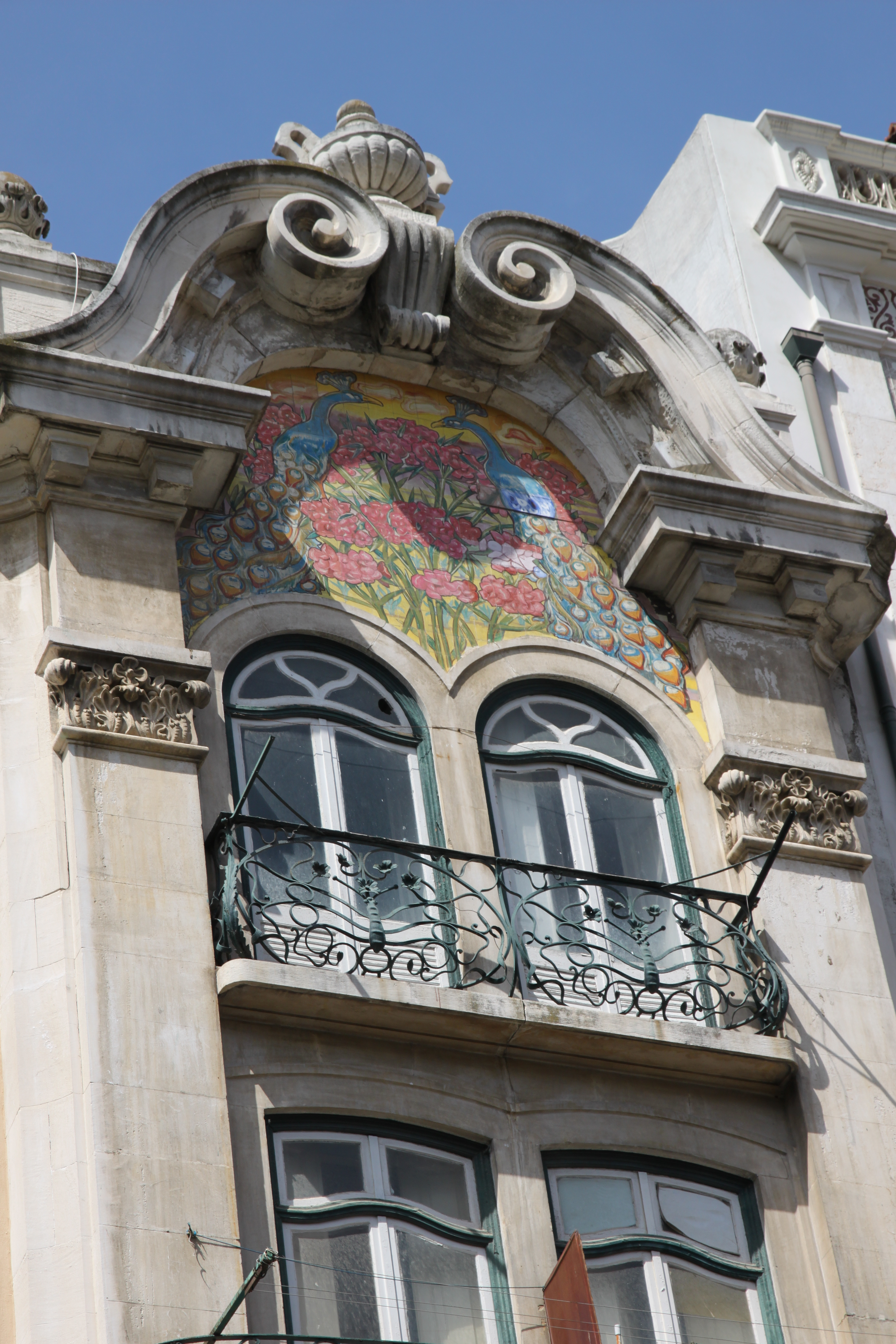
Details of Almirante Reis, 2-2K building in Lisbon (1908)

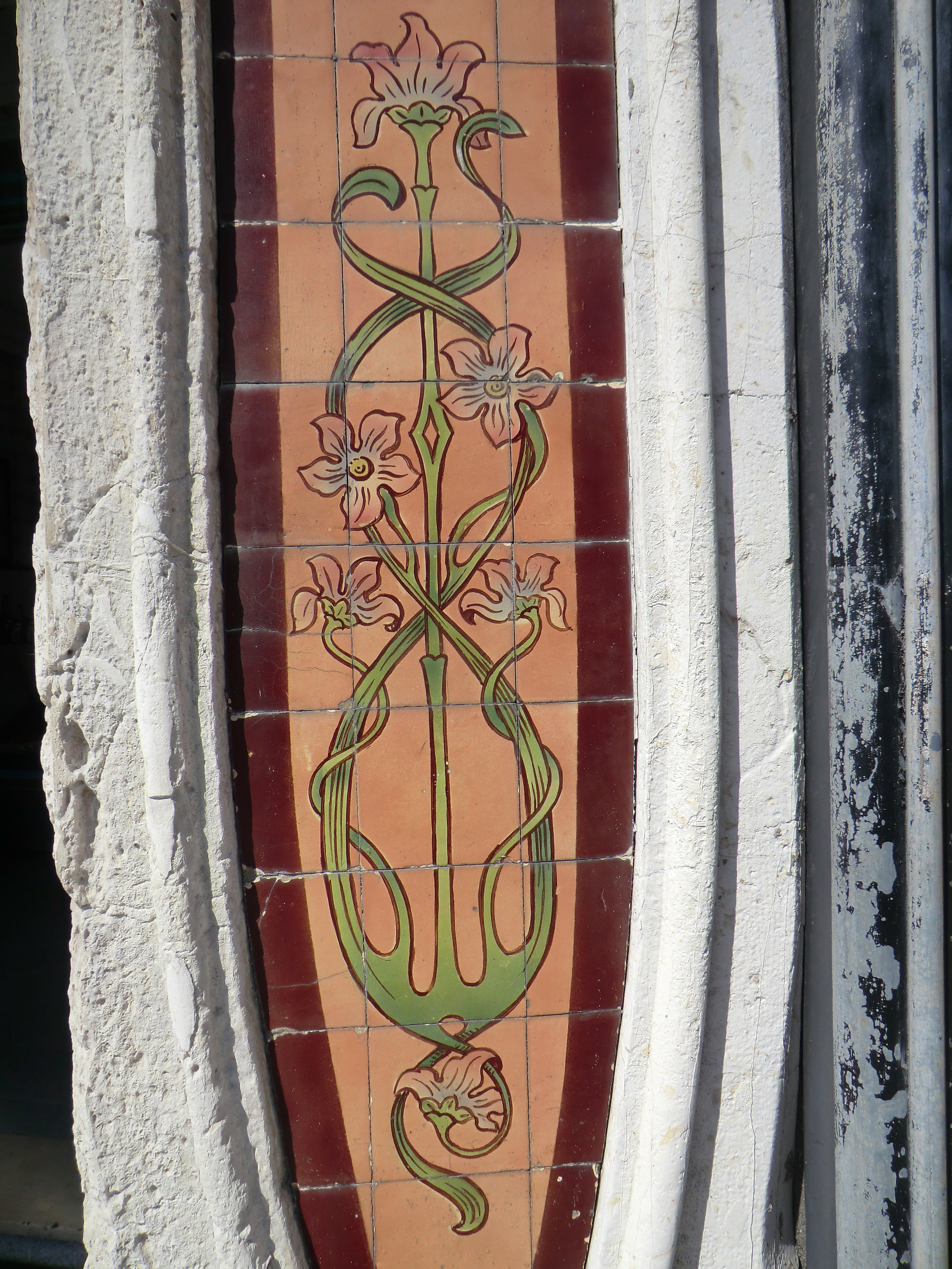
Ceramic tile of Cooperativa Agrícola in Aveiro (1913)

The Art Nouveau variant in Aveiro (Portugal) was called Arte Nova, and its principal characteristic feature was ostentation: the style was used by bourgeoisie who wanted to express their wealth on the façades while leaving the interiors conservative. Another distinctive feature of Arte Nova was the use of locally produced tiles with Art Nouveau motifs.

The most influential artist of Arte Nova was Francisco Augusto da Silva Rocha. Though he was not trained as an architect, he designed many buildings in Aveiro and in other cities in Portugal. One of them, the Major Pessoa residence, has both an Art Nouveau façade and interior, and now hosts the Museum of Arte Nova.

There are other examples of Arte Nova in other cities of Portugal. Some of them are the Museum-Residence Dr. Anastácio Gonçalves by Manuel Joaquim Norte Júnior (1904–1905) in Lisbon, Café Majestic by João Queiroz (1921) and Livraria Lello bookstore by Xavier Esteves (1906), both in Porto.

=== Jugendstil in the Nordic countries ===
==== Finland ====
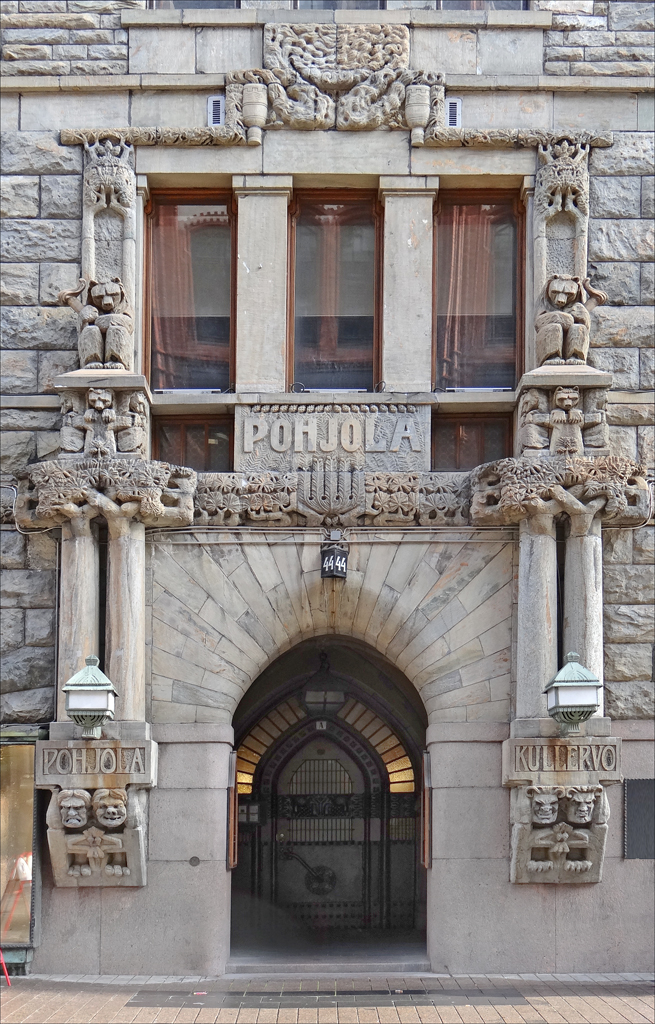
Main entrance of the Pohjola Insurance building in Helsinki, sculptures by Hilda Flodin (1899–1901)

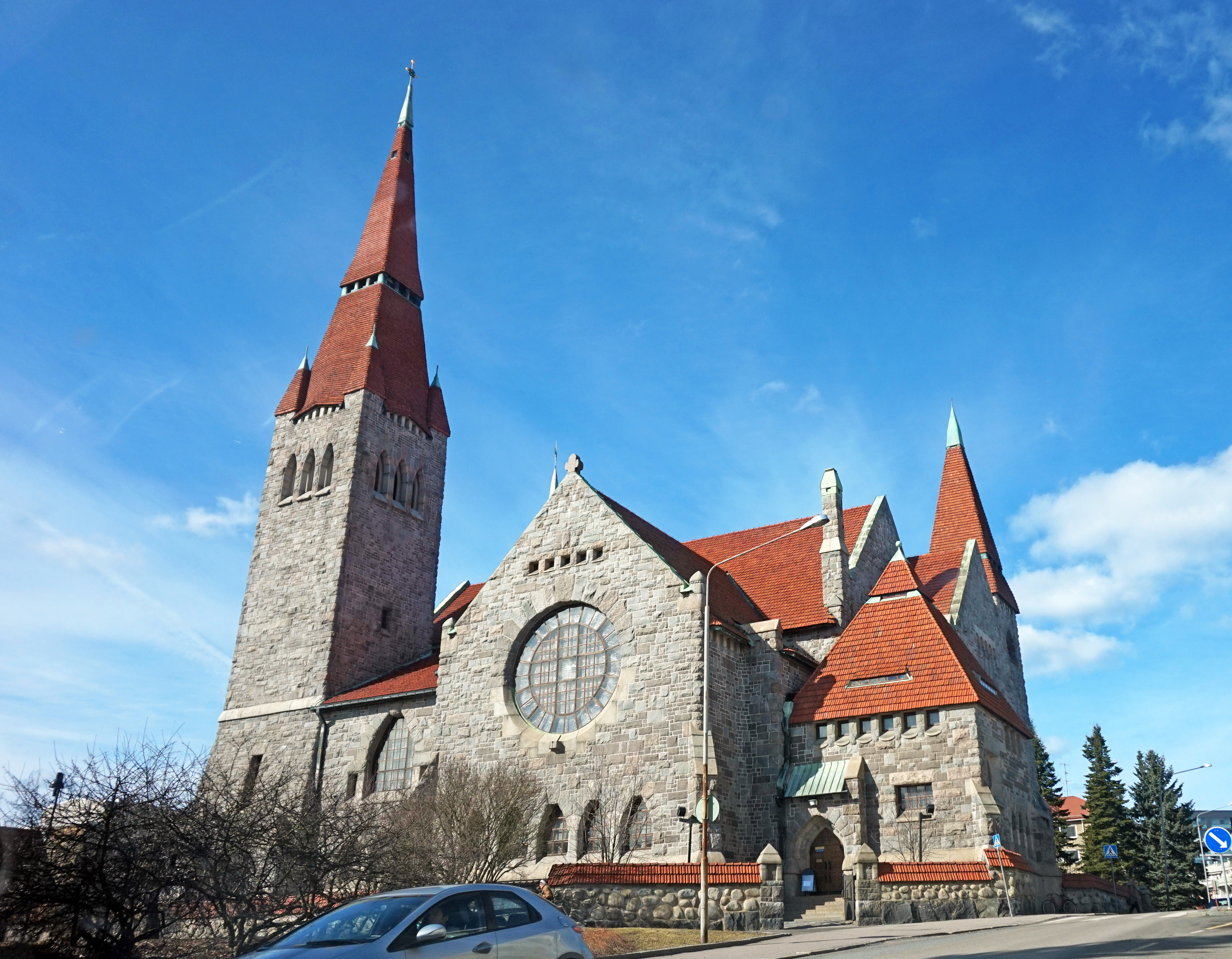
Tampere Cathedral in the Finnish National Romantic Style by Lars Sonck (1902–1907)

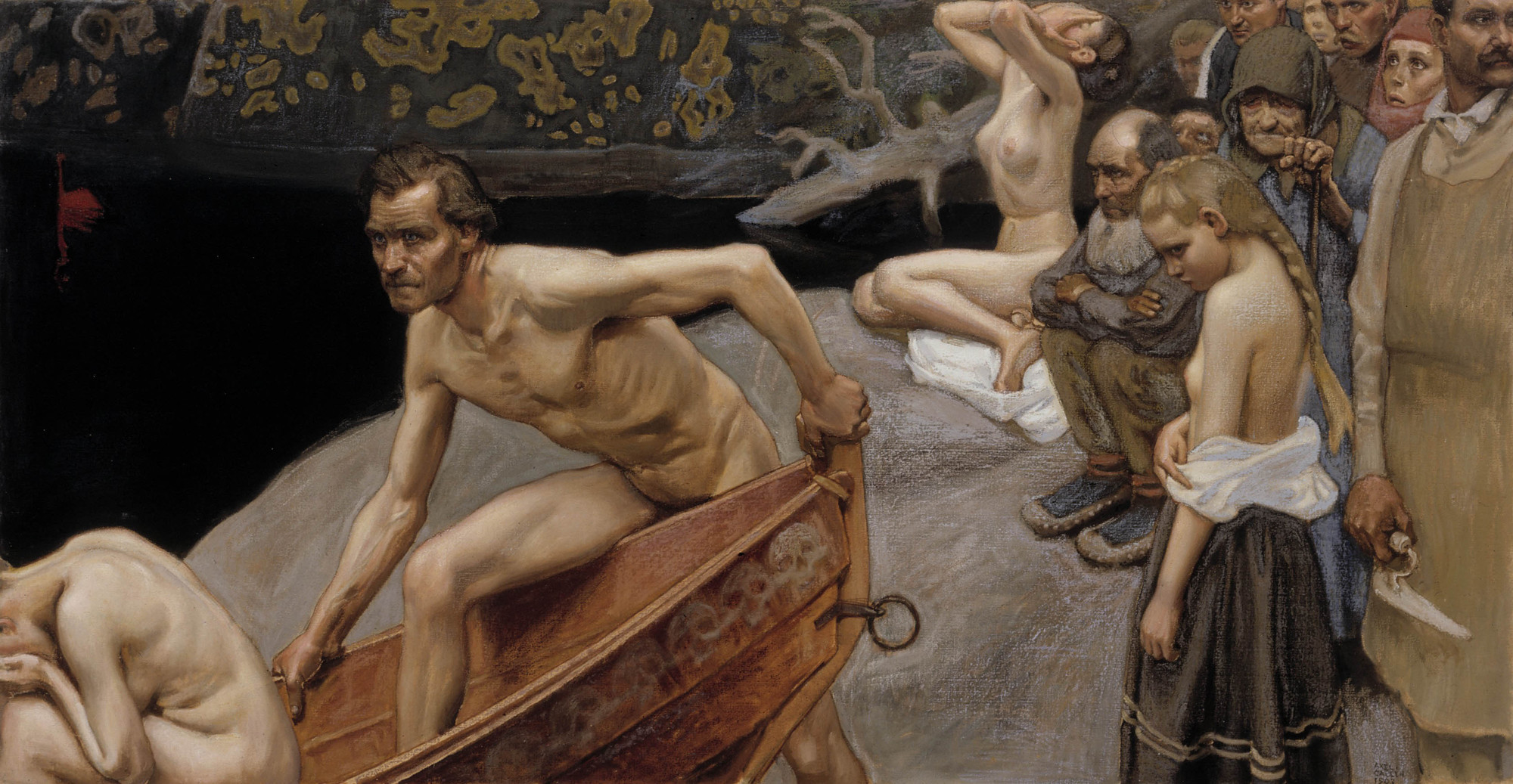
By the River of Tuonela in the Finnish National Romantic Style by Akseli Gallen-Kallela (1903)

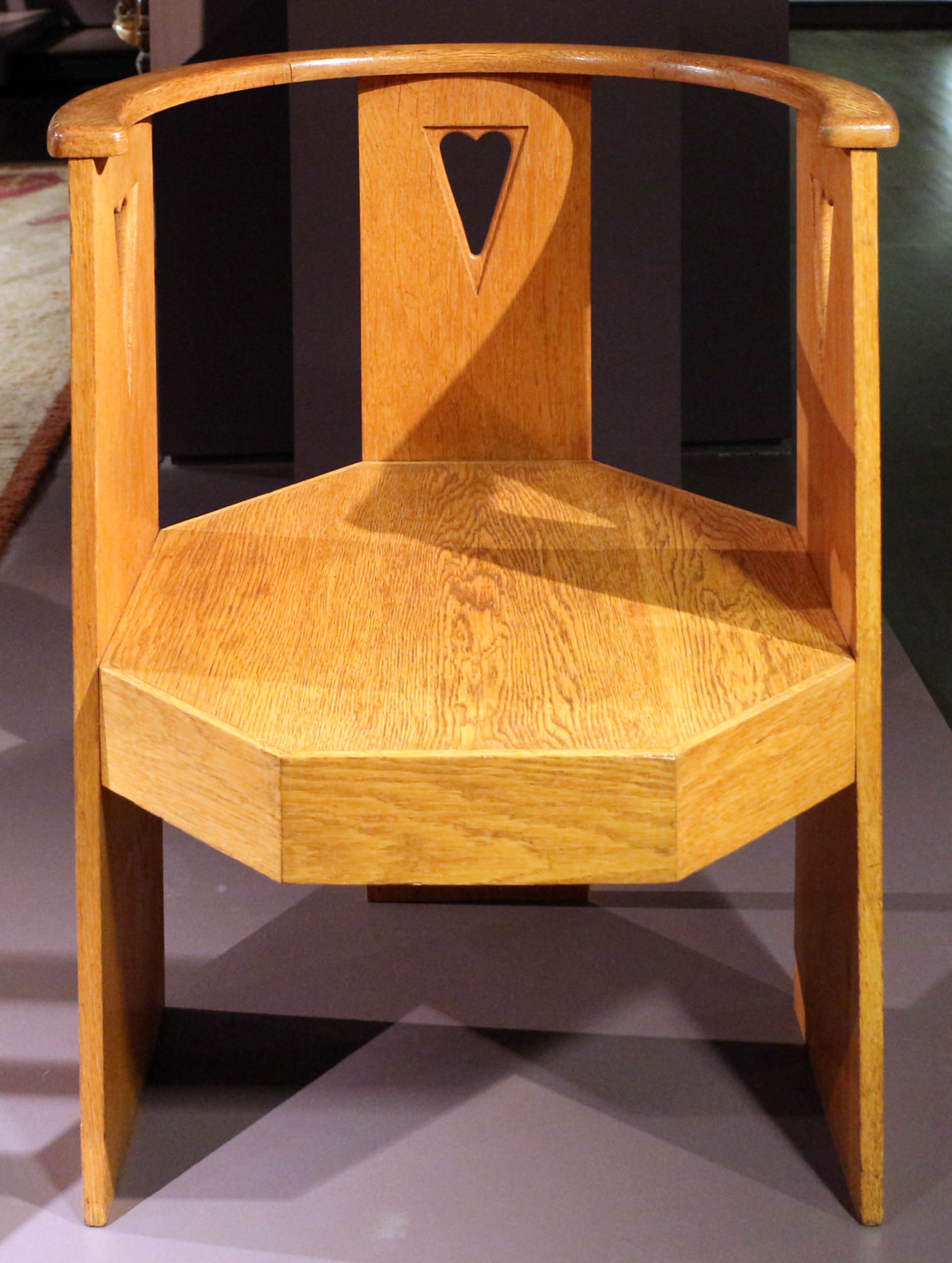
Chair by Eliel Saarinen (1907–1908)

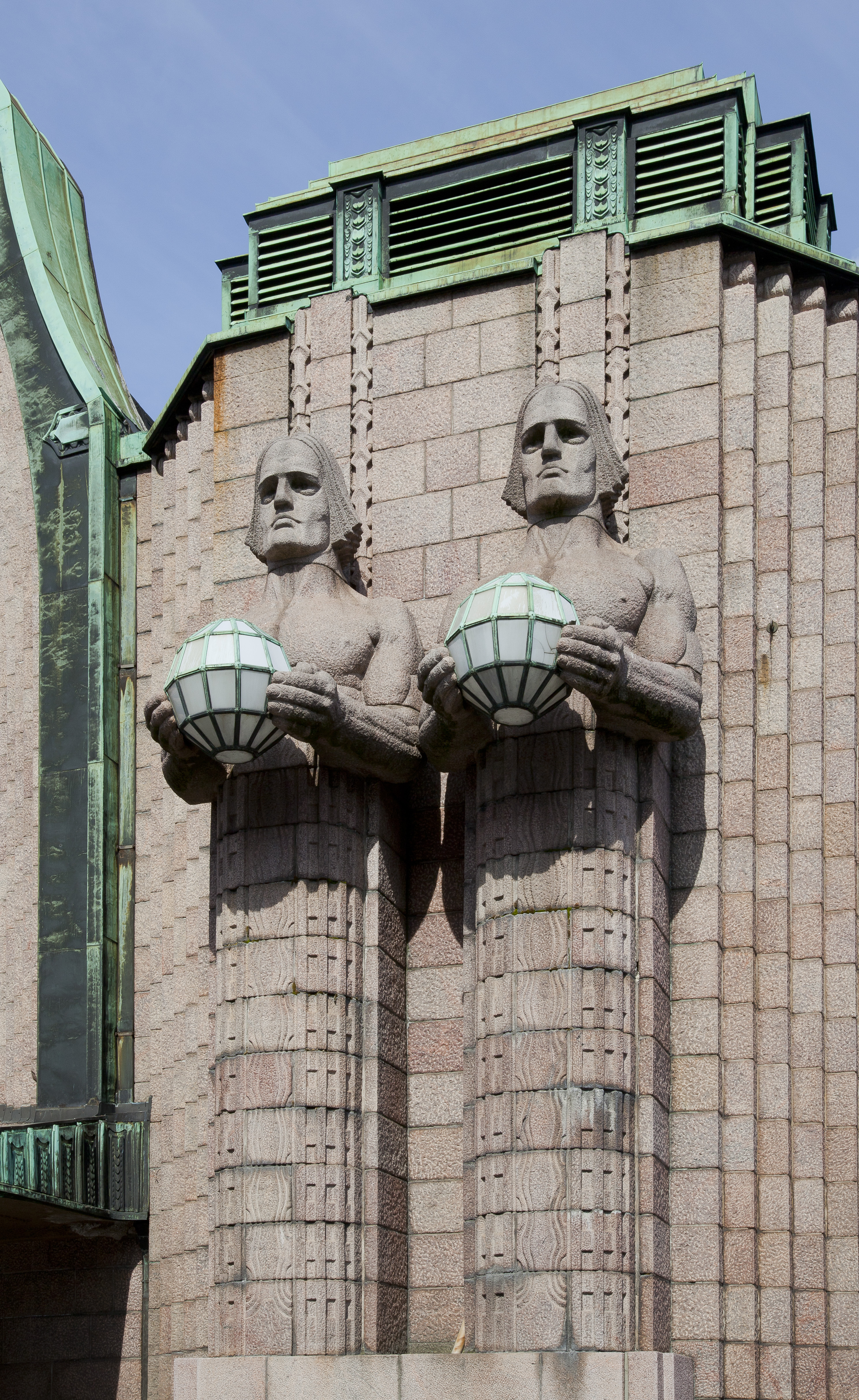
Statues at Helsinki Central railway station by Emil Wikström (1919)

Art Nouveau was popular in the Nordic countries, where it was usually known as Jugendstil, and was often combined with the National Romantic Style of each country. The Nordic country with the largest number of Jugendstil buildings is the Grand Duchy of Finland, then a part of Russian Empire. The Jugendstil period coincided with Golden Age of Finnish Art and national awakening. After Paris Exposition in 1900 the leading Finnish artist was Akseli Gallen-Kallela. He is known for his illustrations of the Kalevala, the Finnish national epic, as well as for painting numerous Judendstil buildings in the Duchy.

The architects of the Finnish pavilion at the Exposition were Herman Gesellius, Armas Lindgren, and Eliel Saarinen. They worked together from 1896 to 1905 and created many notable buildings in Helsinki including Pohjola Insurance building (1899–1901) and National Museum of Finland (1905–1910) as well as their joint residence Hvitträsk in Kirkkonummi (1902). Architects were inspired by Nordic legends and nature, rough granite façade thus became a symbol for belonging to the Finnish nation. After the firm dissolved, Saarinen designed the Helsinki Railway Station (1905–1914) in clearer forms, influenced by American architecture. The sculptor who worked with Saarinen in construction of National Museum of Finland and Helsinki Railway Station was Emil Wikström.

Another architect who created several notable works in Finland was Lars Sonck. His major Jugendstil works include Tampere Cathedral (1902–1907), Ainola, the home of Jean Sibelius (1903), Headquarters of the Helsinki Telephone Association (1903–1907) and Kallio Church in Helsinki (1908–1912). Also, Magnus Schjerfbeck, brother of Helene Schjerfbeck, made tuberculosis sanatorium known as Nummela Sanatorium in 1903 using the Jugendstil style.

==== Norway ====
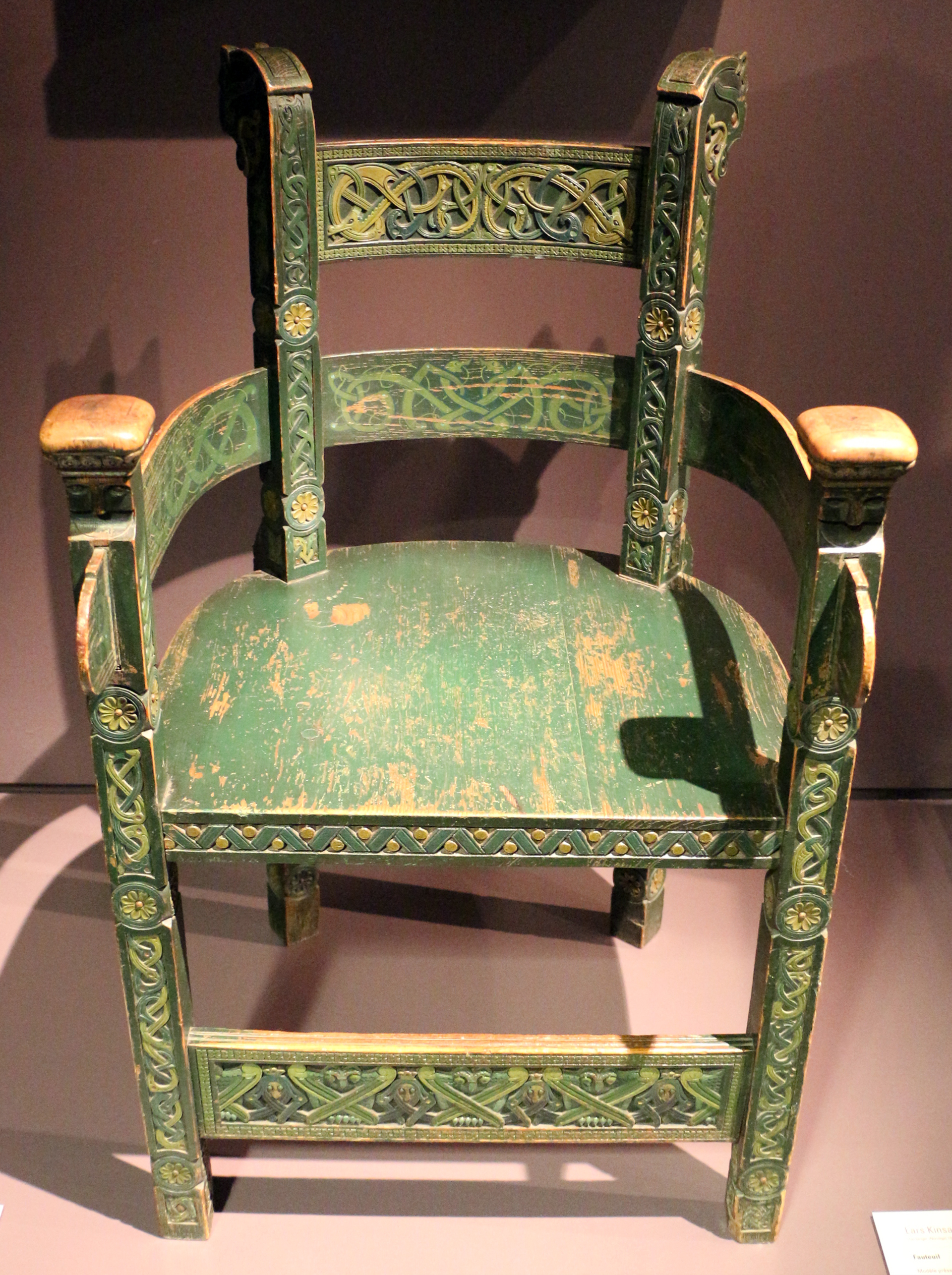
Viking-Art Nouveau chair by Lars Kinsarvik (1900)

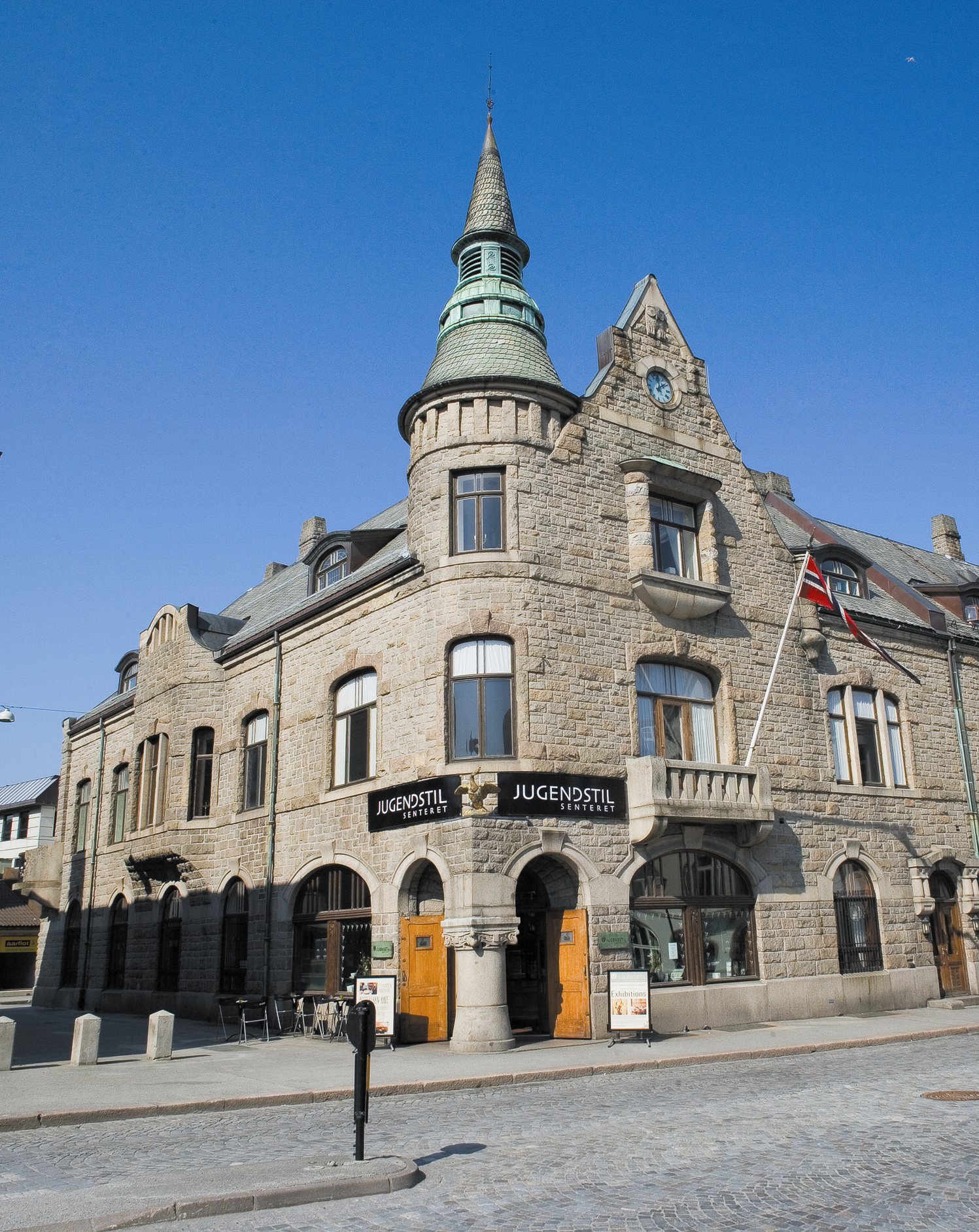
Art Nouveau Centre in Ålesund (1905–1907)

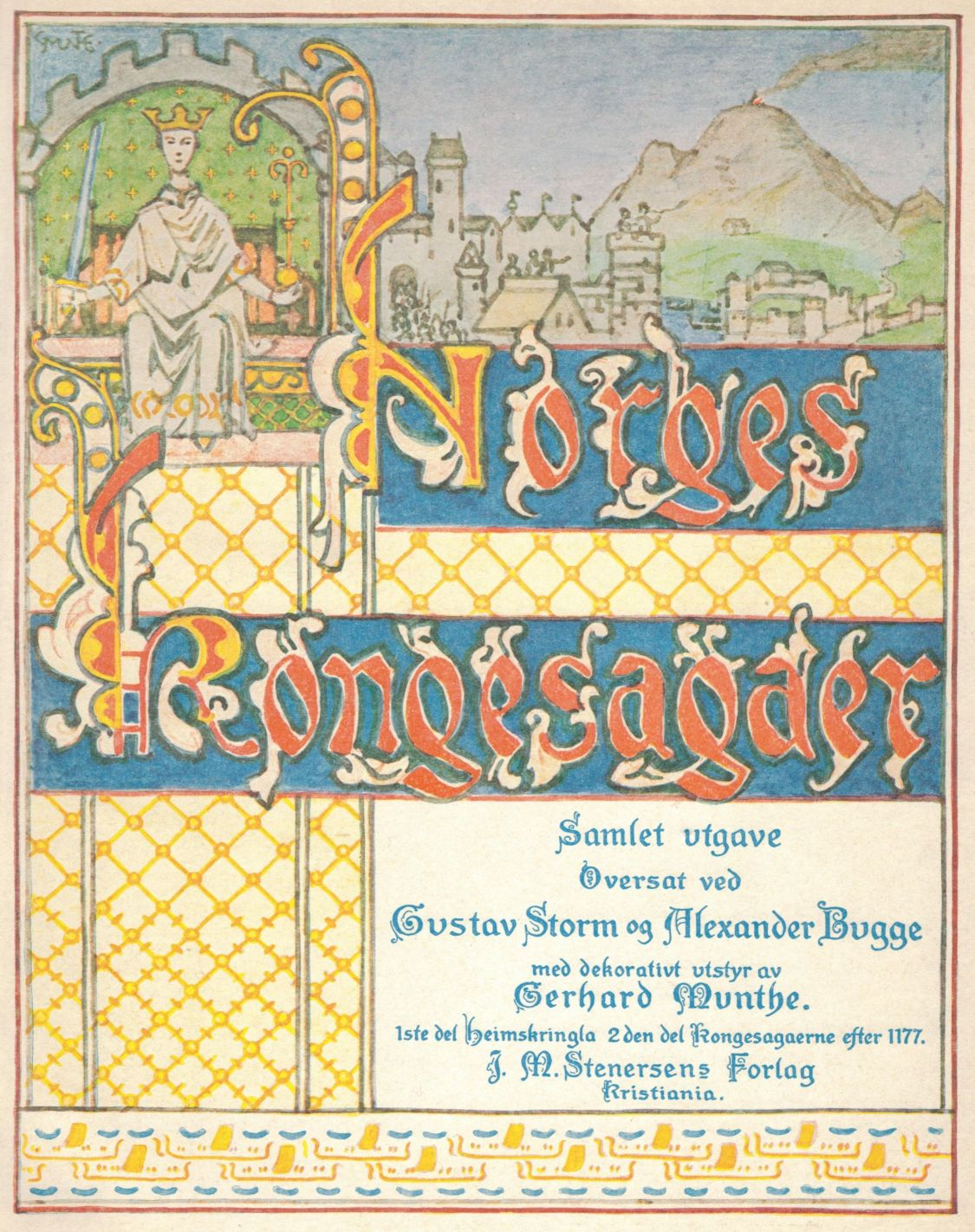
Graphic design by Gerhard Munthe (1914)

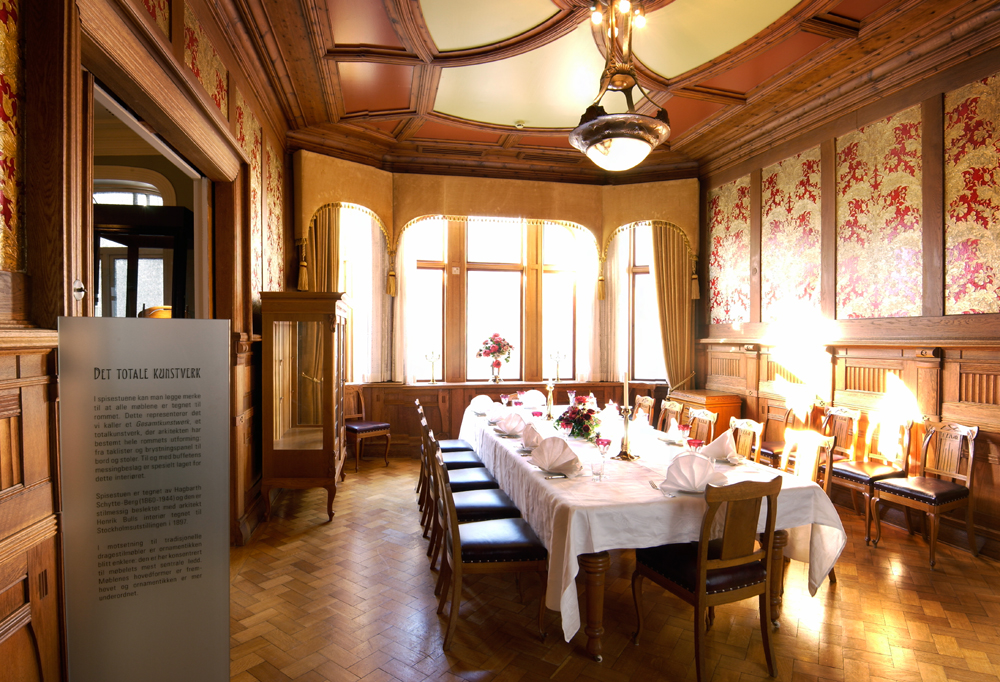
Interior of Art Nouveau Centre in Ålesund

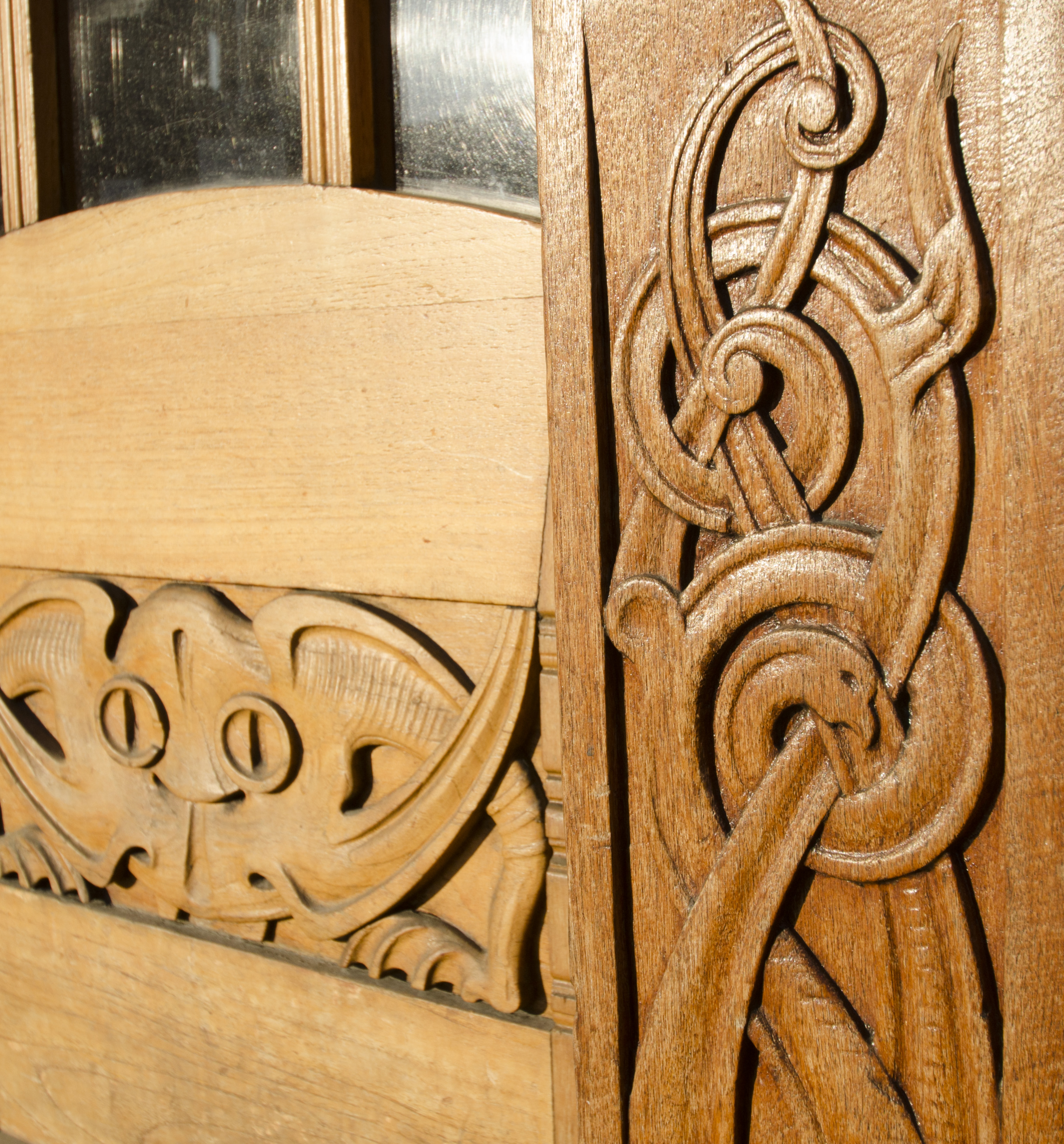
Ornaments of a door in Art Nouveau Centre in Ålesund

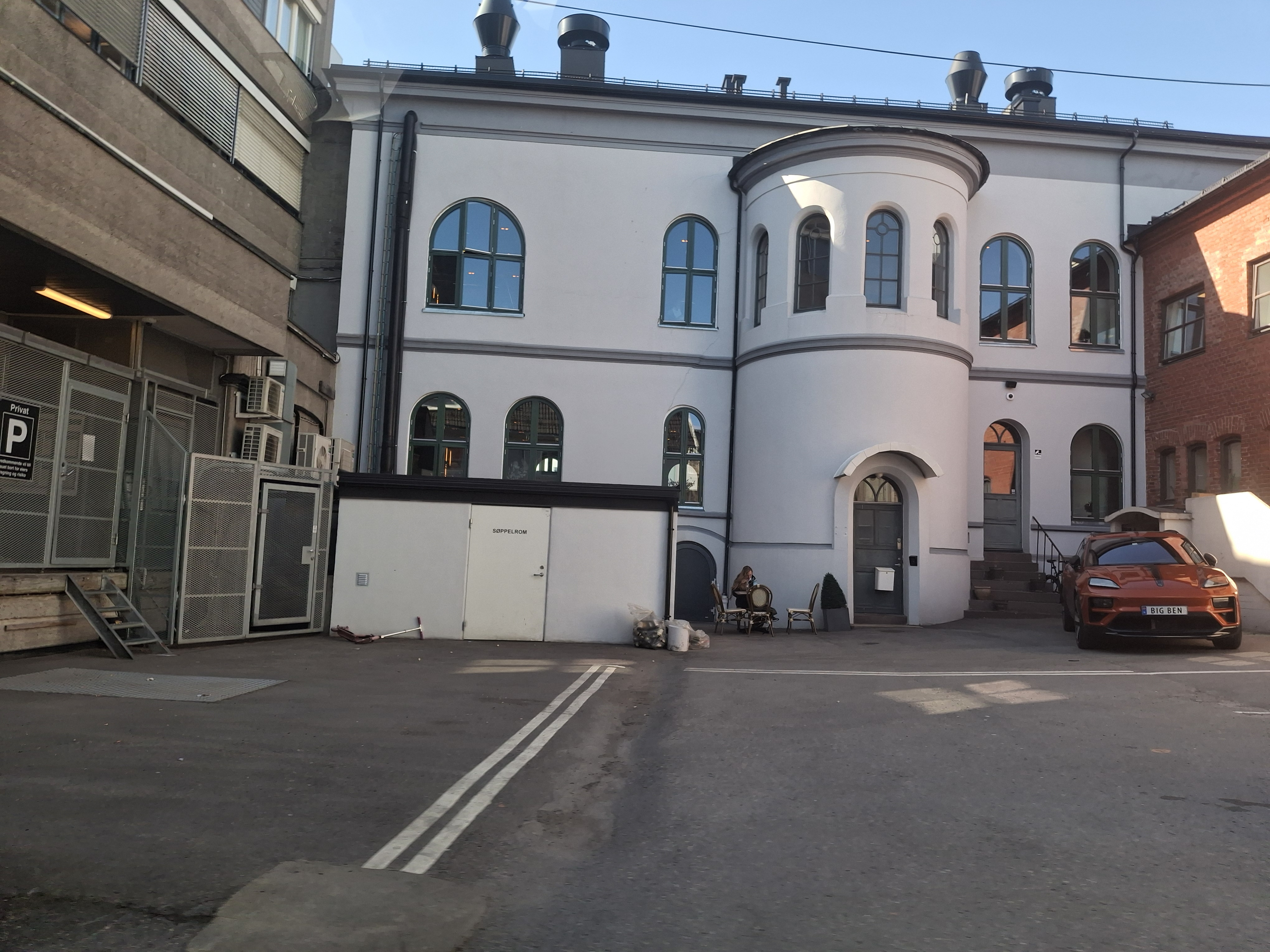
Art Nouveau building in Tønsberg

Norway also was aspiring independence (from Sweden) and local Art Nouveau was connected with a revival inspired by Viking folk art and crafts. Notable designers included Lars Kisarvik, who designed chairs with traditional Viking and Celtic patterns, and Gerhard Munthe, who designed a chair with a stylised dragon-head emblem from ancient Viking ships, as well as a wide variety of posters, paintings and graphics.

The Norwegian town of Ålesund is regarded as the main centre of Art Nouveau in Scandinavia because it was completely reconstructed after a fire of 23 January 1904. About 350 buildings were built between 1904 and 1907 under an urban plan designed by the engineer Frederik Næsser. The merger of unity and variety gave birth to a style known as Ål Stil. Buildings of the style have linear decor and echoes of both Jugendstil and vernacular elements, e.g. towers of stave churches or the crested roofs. One of the buildings, Swan Pharmacy, now hosts the Art Nouveau Centre.

==== Sweden and Denmark ====
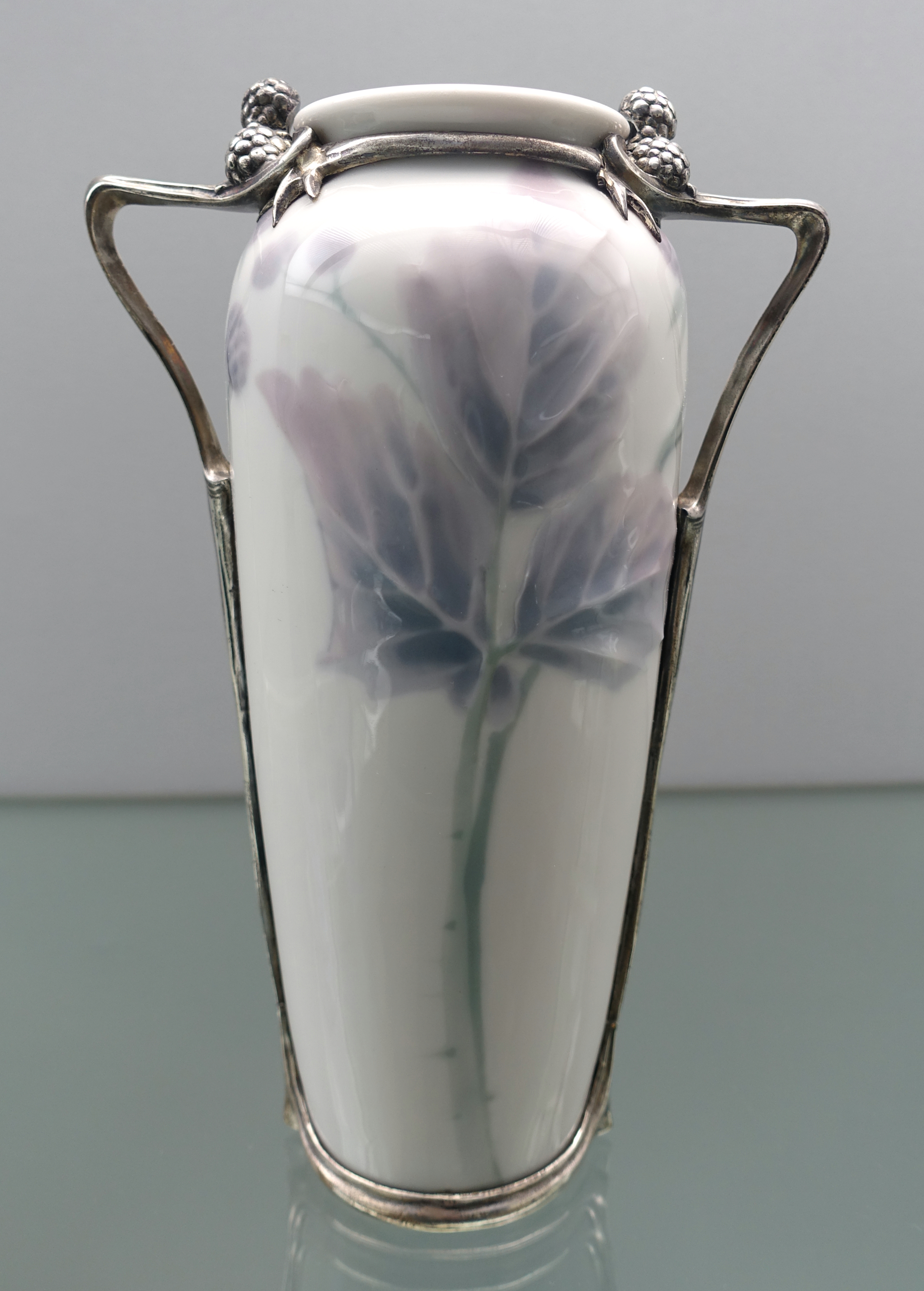
Vase with blackberry, painting by Per Algot Eriksson, and silver by E. Lefebvre, in the Bröhan Museum, Berlin

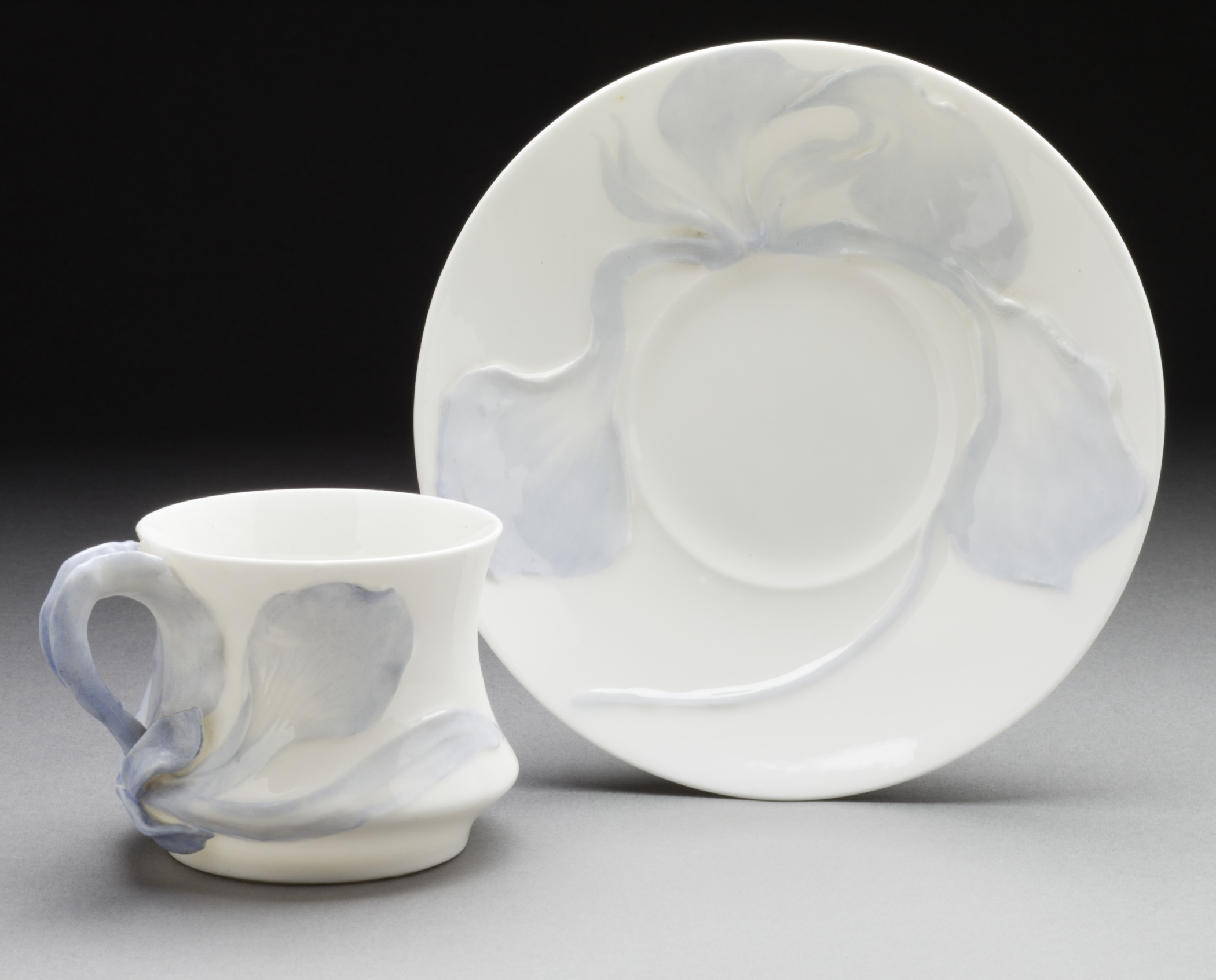
Cup and saucer from the 'iris' service (1897), in the Los Angeles County Museum of Art

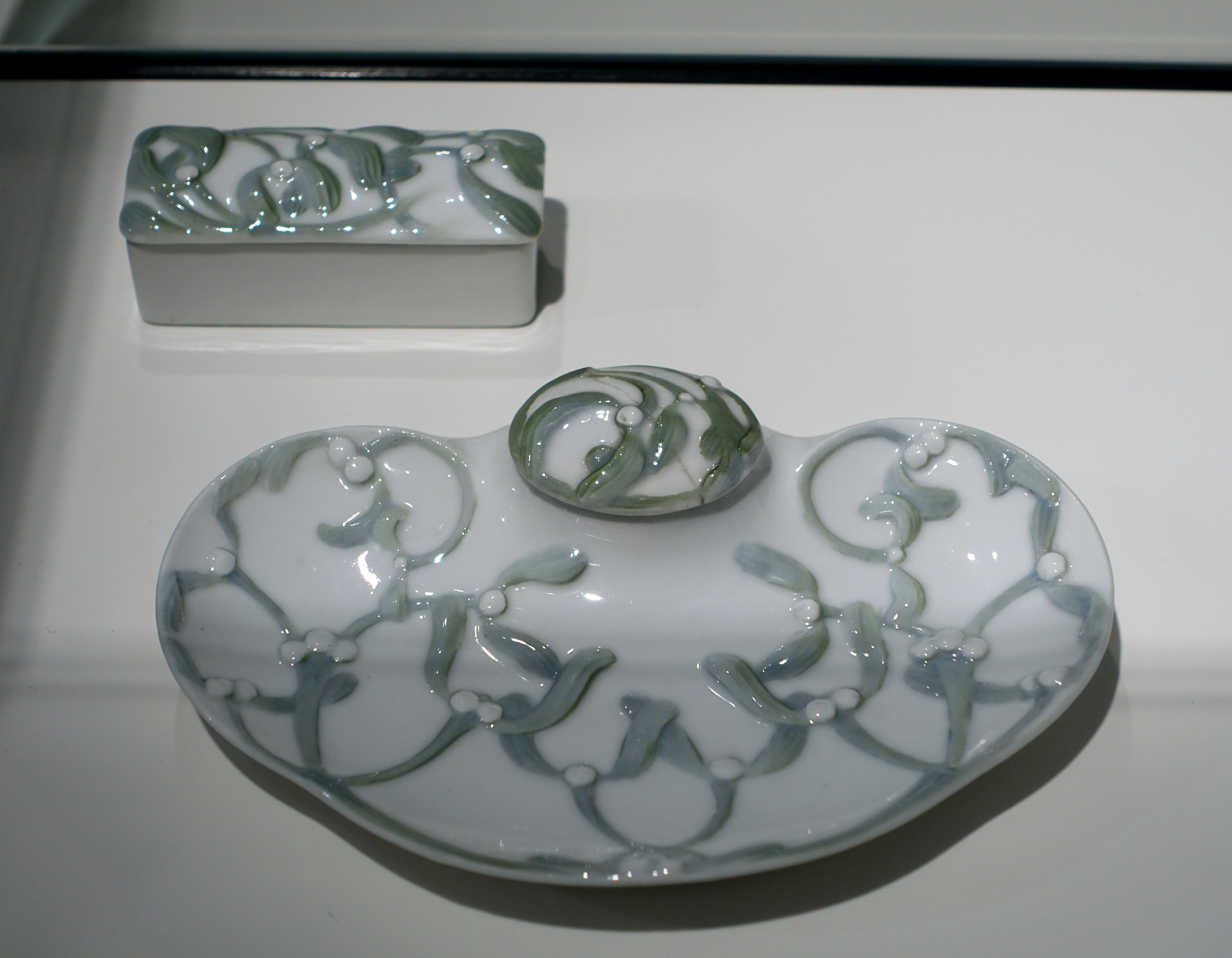
Inkwell and stamp box, by Jens Dahl-Jensen (c. 1900), in the Hessisches Landesmuseum Darmstadt, Germany

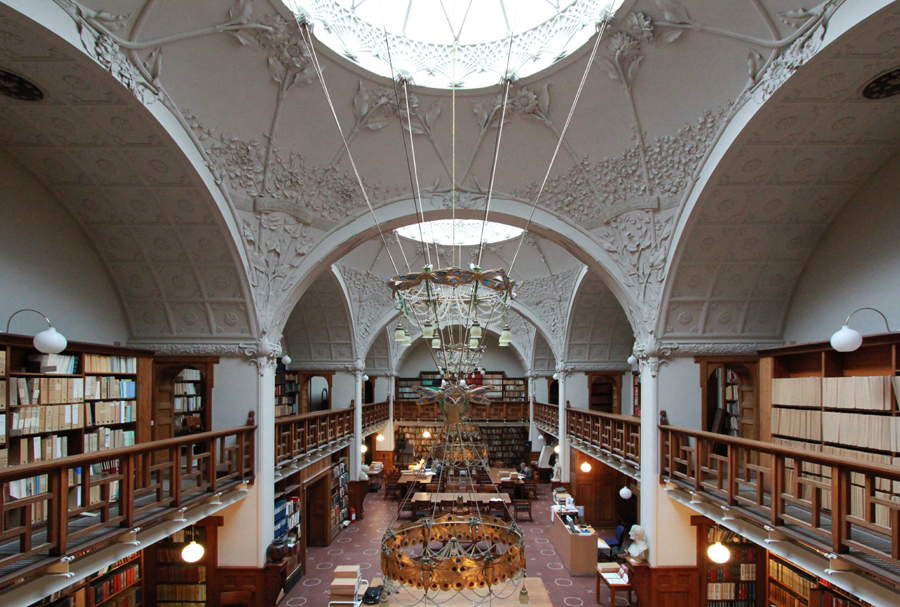
Great Hall of City Library of Aarhus by Karl Hansen Reistrup

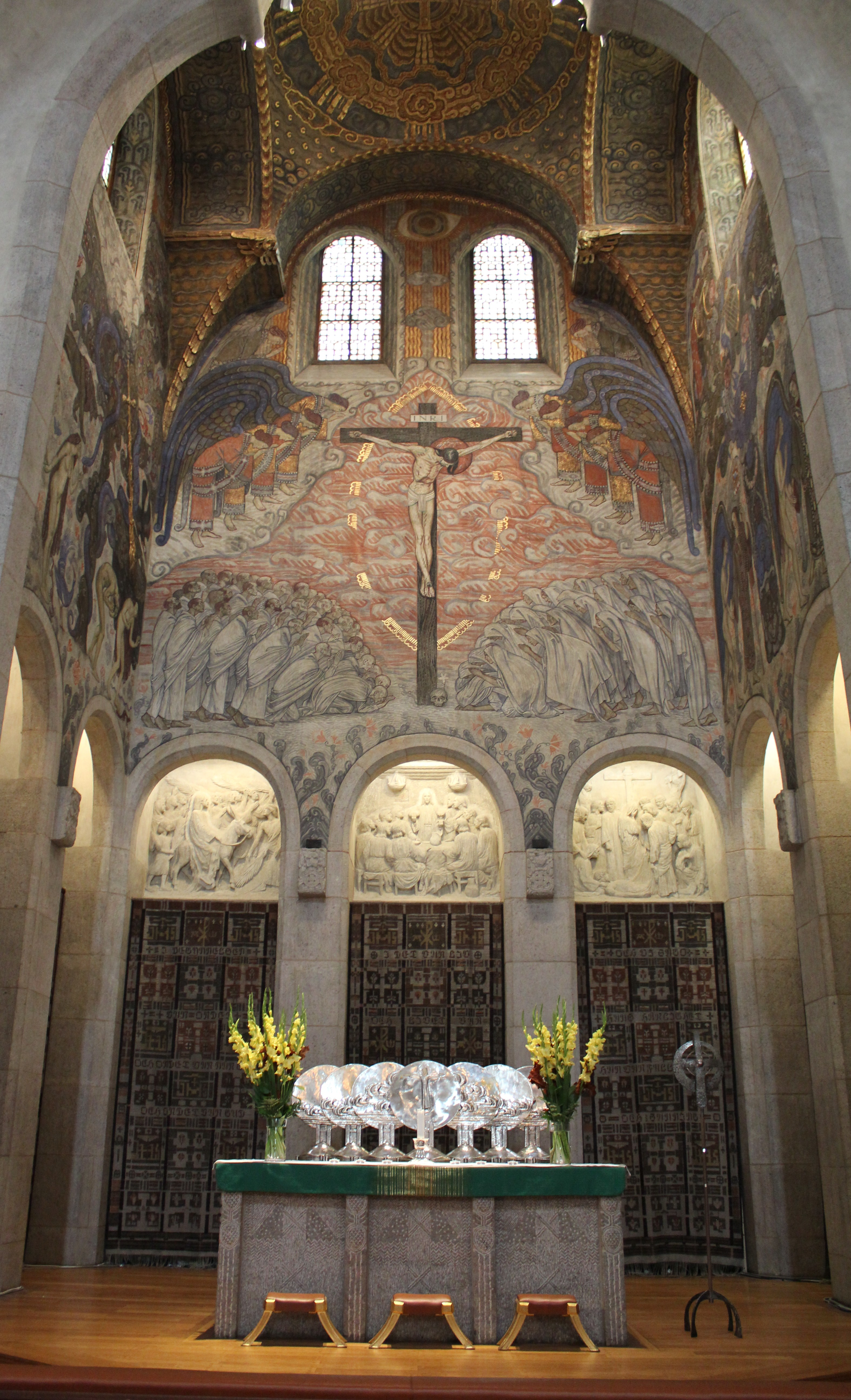
Altar of Engelbrektskyrkan in Stockholm (1914)

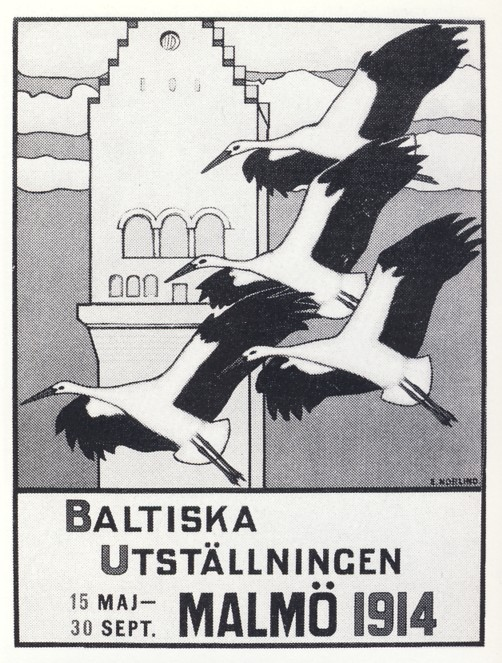
Poster for the Baltic Exhibition in Malmö (1914)

Jugendstil masterpieces of other Nordic countries include Engelbrektskyrkan (1914) and Royal Dramatic Theatre (1901–1908) in Stockholm, Sweden and former City Library (now Danish National Business Archives) in Aarhus, Denmark (1898–1901). The architect of the latter is Hack Kampmann, then a proponent of National Romantic Style who also created Custom House, Theatre and Villa Kampen in Aarhus. Denmark's most notable Art Nouveau designer was the silversmith Georg Jensen. The Baltic Exhibition in Malmö 1914 can be seen as the last major manifestation of the Jugendstil in Sweden.

=== Modern in Russia ===
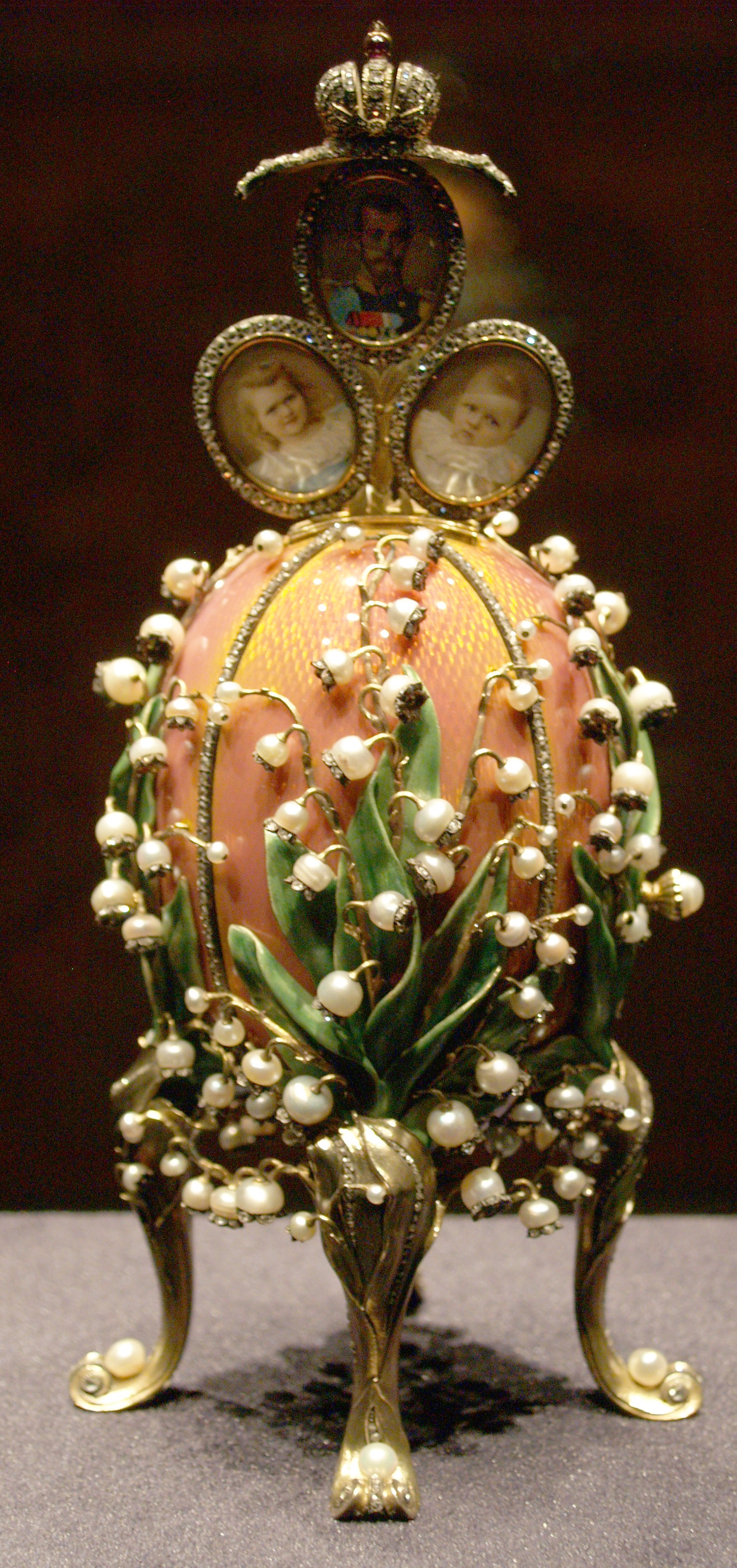
An Art Nouveau Fabergé egg (Note: Made as an Easter gift from Emperor Nicholas II of Russia to his wife) (1898)

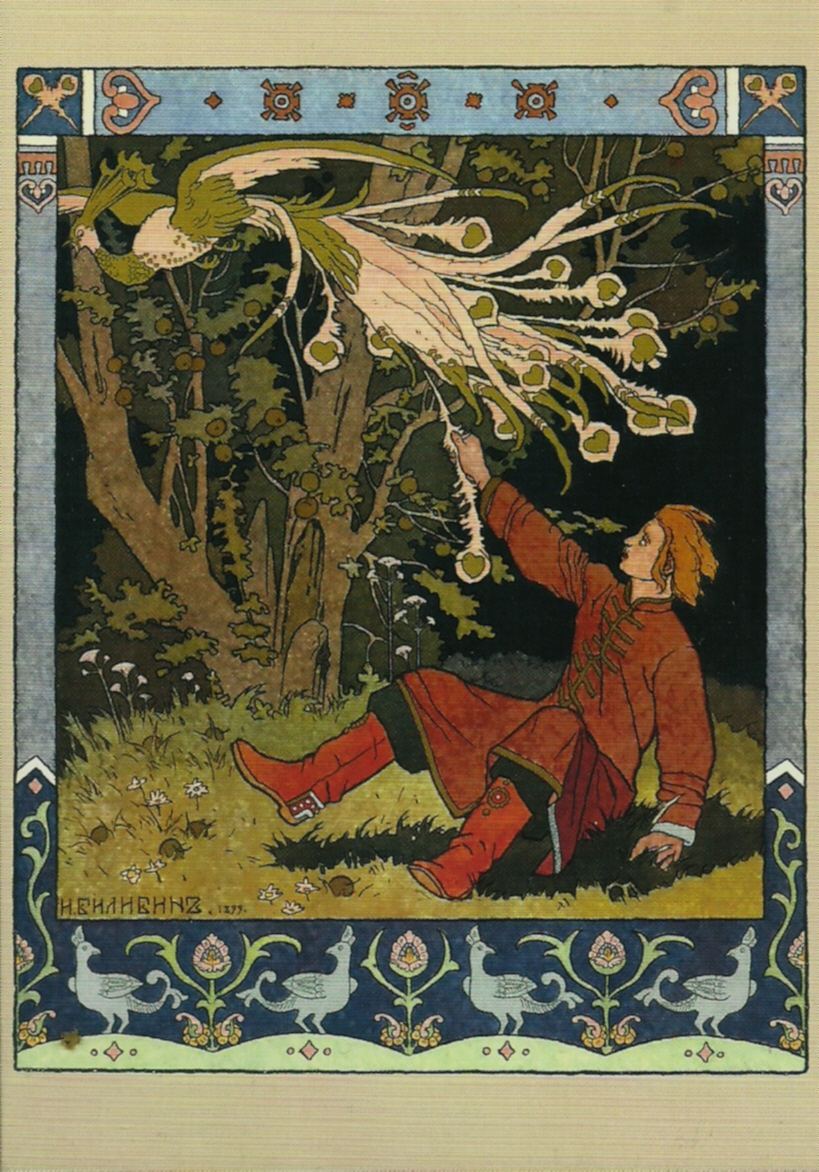
Illustration of the Firebird by Ivan Bilibin (1899)

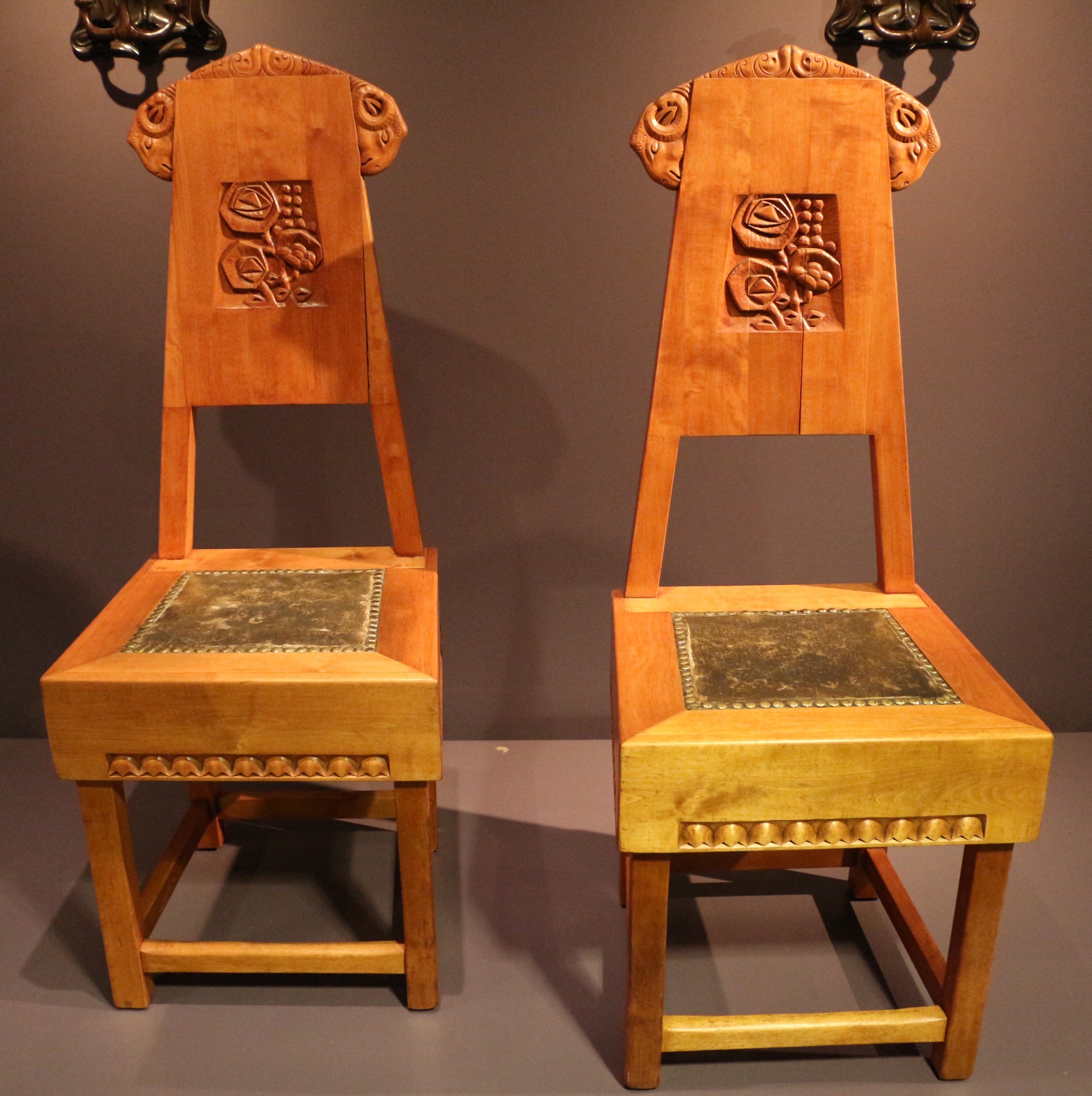
Chairs by Sergey Malyutin (c. 1900), Talashkino Art Colony

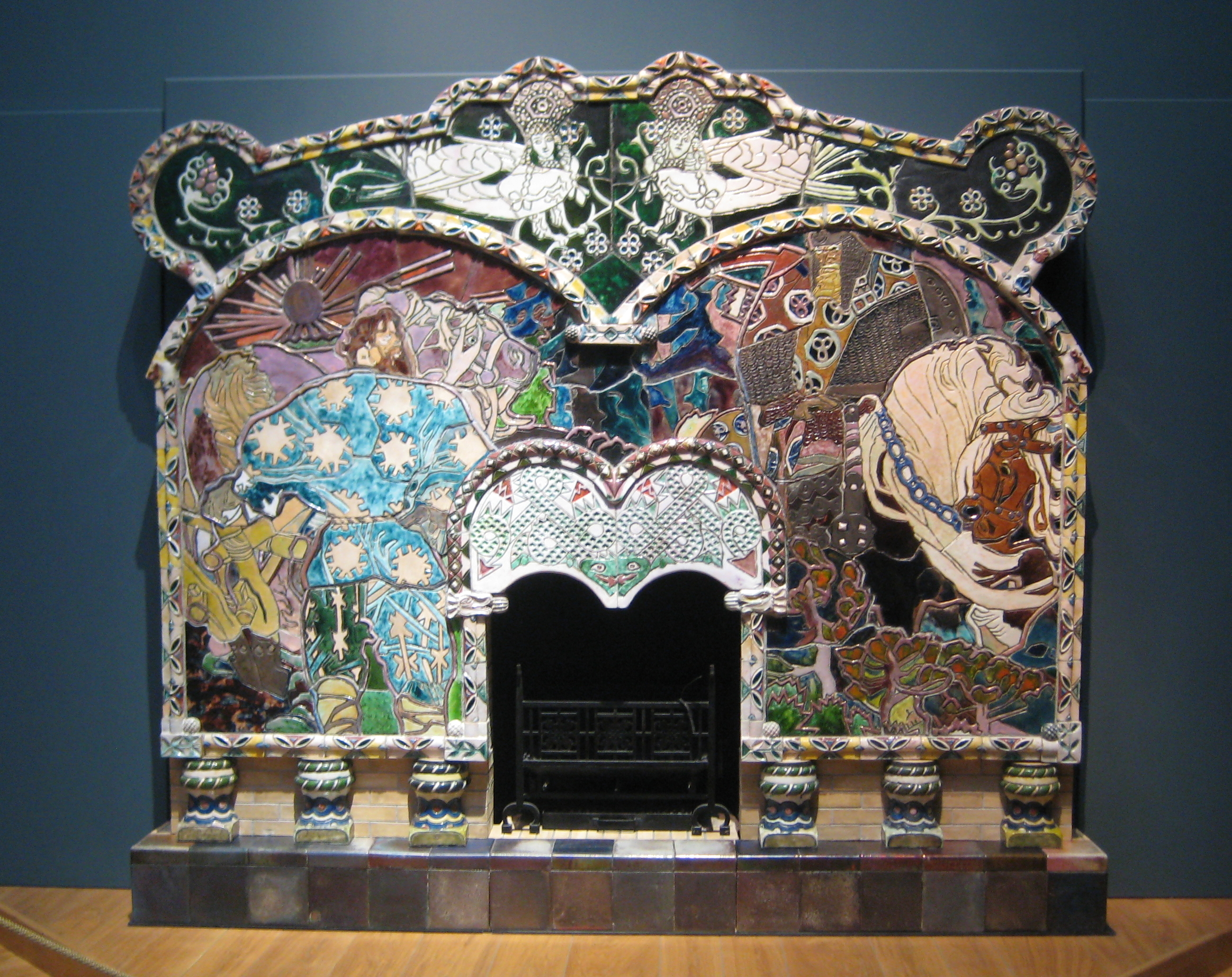
Ceramic fireplace on Russian folklore theme by Mikhail Vrubel (1908)

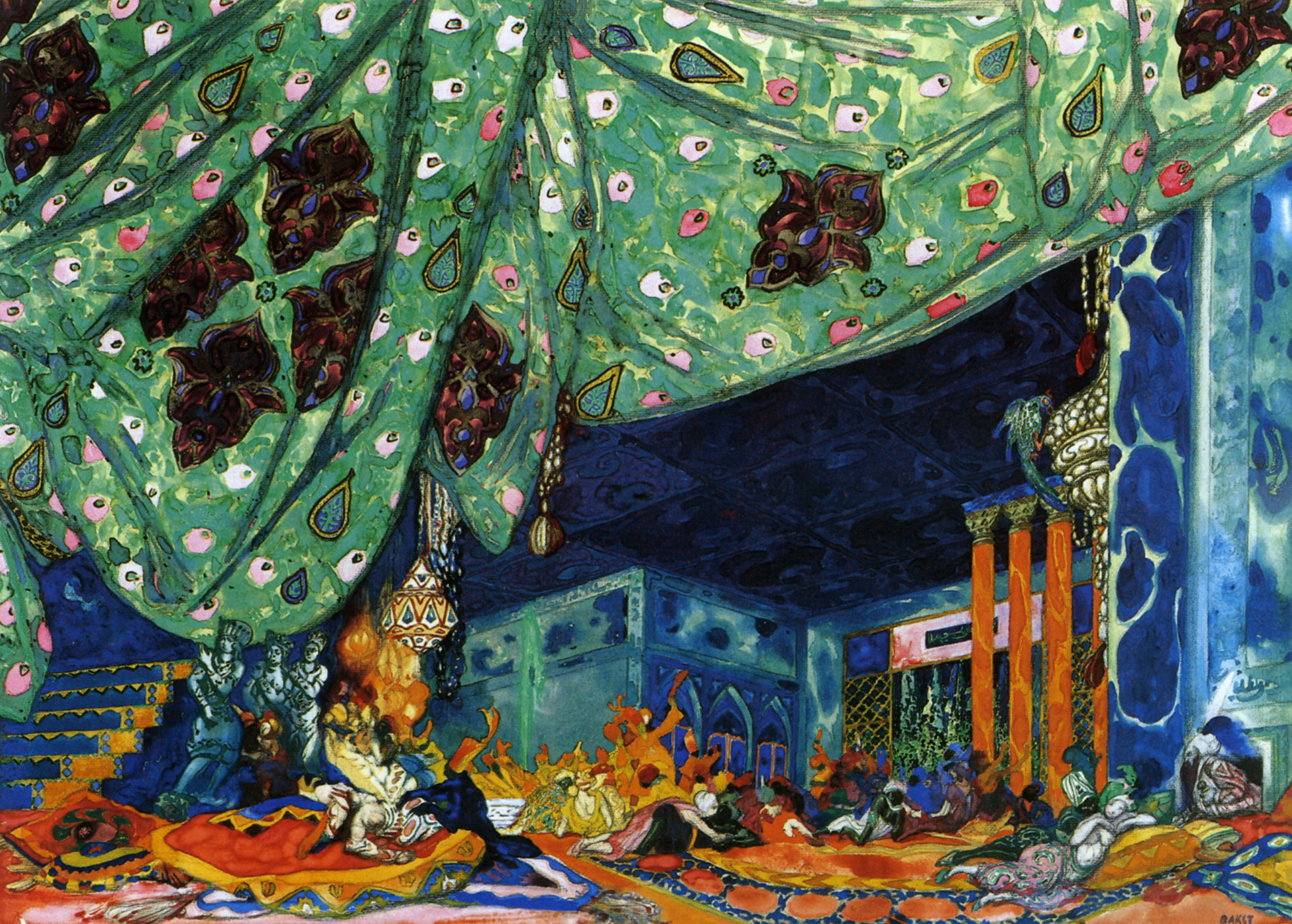
Set for Nikolai Rimsky-Korsakov's ballet Sheherazade by Léon Bakst (1910)

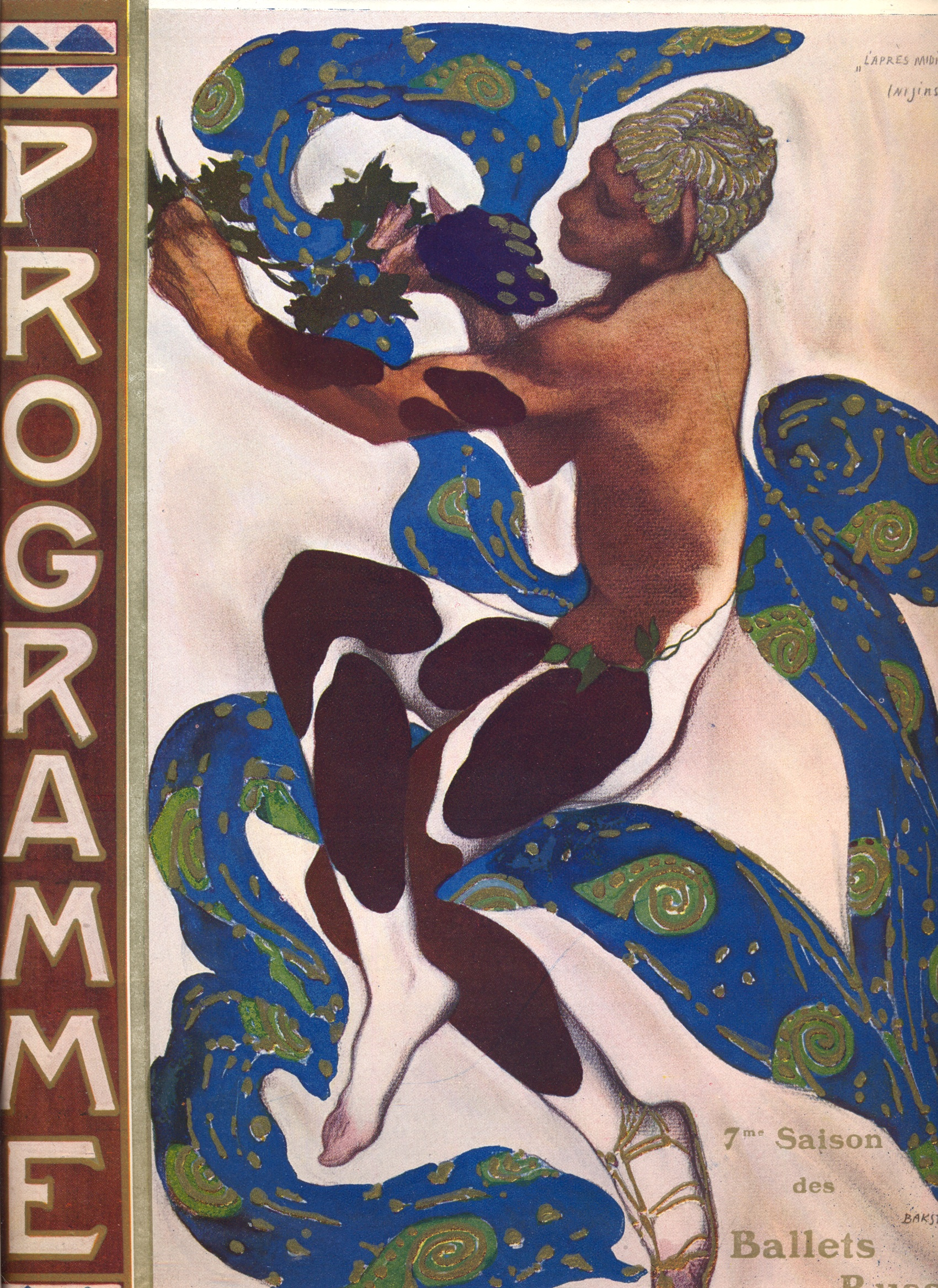
Program design for Afternoon of a Faun by Bakst for Ballets Russes (1912)

Модерн ('Modern') was a very colourful Russian variation of Art Nouveau which appeared in Moscow and Saint Petersburg in 1898 with the publication of a new art journal, Мир искусства (Mir Iskusstva, 'The World of Art'), by Russian artists Alexandre Benois and Léon Bakst, and chief editor Sergei Diaghilev. The magazine organized exhibitions of leading Russian artists, including Mikhail Vrubel, Konstantin Somov, Isaac Levitan, and the book illustrator Ivan Bilibin. The World of Art style made less use of the vegetal and floral forms of French Art Nouveau; it drew heavily upon the bright colours and exotic designs of Russian folklore and fairy tales. The most influential contribution of the Mir Iskusstva was the creation of a new ballet company, the Ballets Russes, headed by Diaghilev, with costumes and sets designed by Bakst and Benois. The new ballet company premiered in Paris in 1909, and performed there every year through 1913. The exotic and colourful sets designed by Benois and Bakst had a major impact on French art and design. The costume and set designs were reproduced in the leading Paris magazines, L'Illustration, La Vie parisienne and Gazette du bon ton, and the Russian style became known in Paris as à la Bakst. The company was stranded in Paris first by the outbreak of World War I, and then by the Russian Revolution in 1917, and ironically never performed in Russia.

Of Russian architects, the most prominent in the pure Art Nouveau style was Fyodor Schechtel. The most famous example is the Ryabushinsky House in Moscow. It was built by a Russian businessman and newspaper owner, and then, after the Russian Revolution, became the residence of the writer Maxim Gorky, and is now the Gorky Museum. Its main staircase, made of a polished aggregate of concrete, marble and granite, has flowing, curling lines like the waves of the sea, and is illuminated by a lamp in the form of a floating jellyfish. The interior also features doors, windows and ceiling decorated with colorful frescoes of mosaic. Schechtel, who is also considered a major figure in Russian symbolism, designed several other landmark buildings in Moscow, including the rebuilding of the Moscow Yaroslavsky railway station, in a more traditional Moscow revival style.

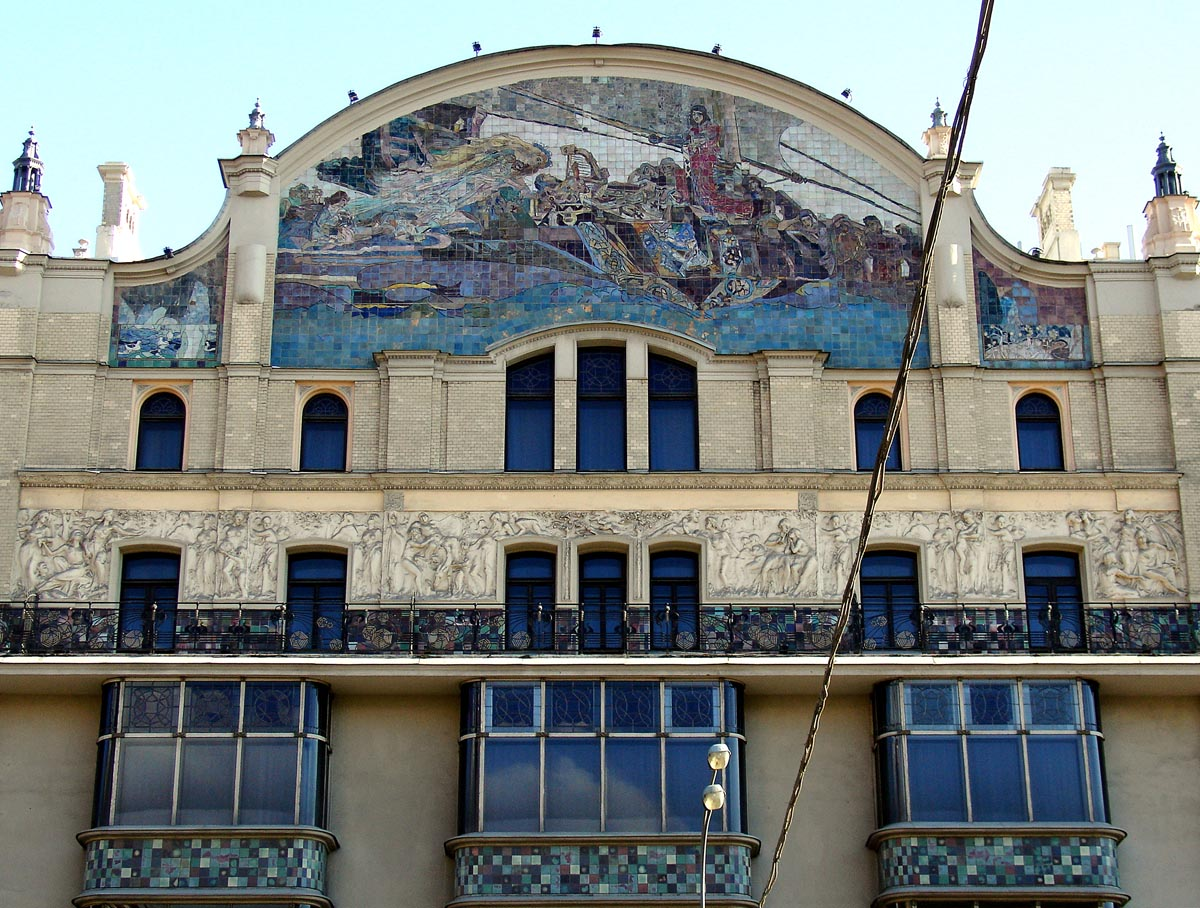
Façade of the Hotel Metropol in Moscow with mosaics by Mikhail Vrubel (1899–1907)

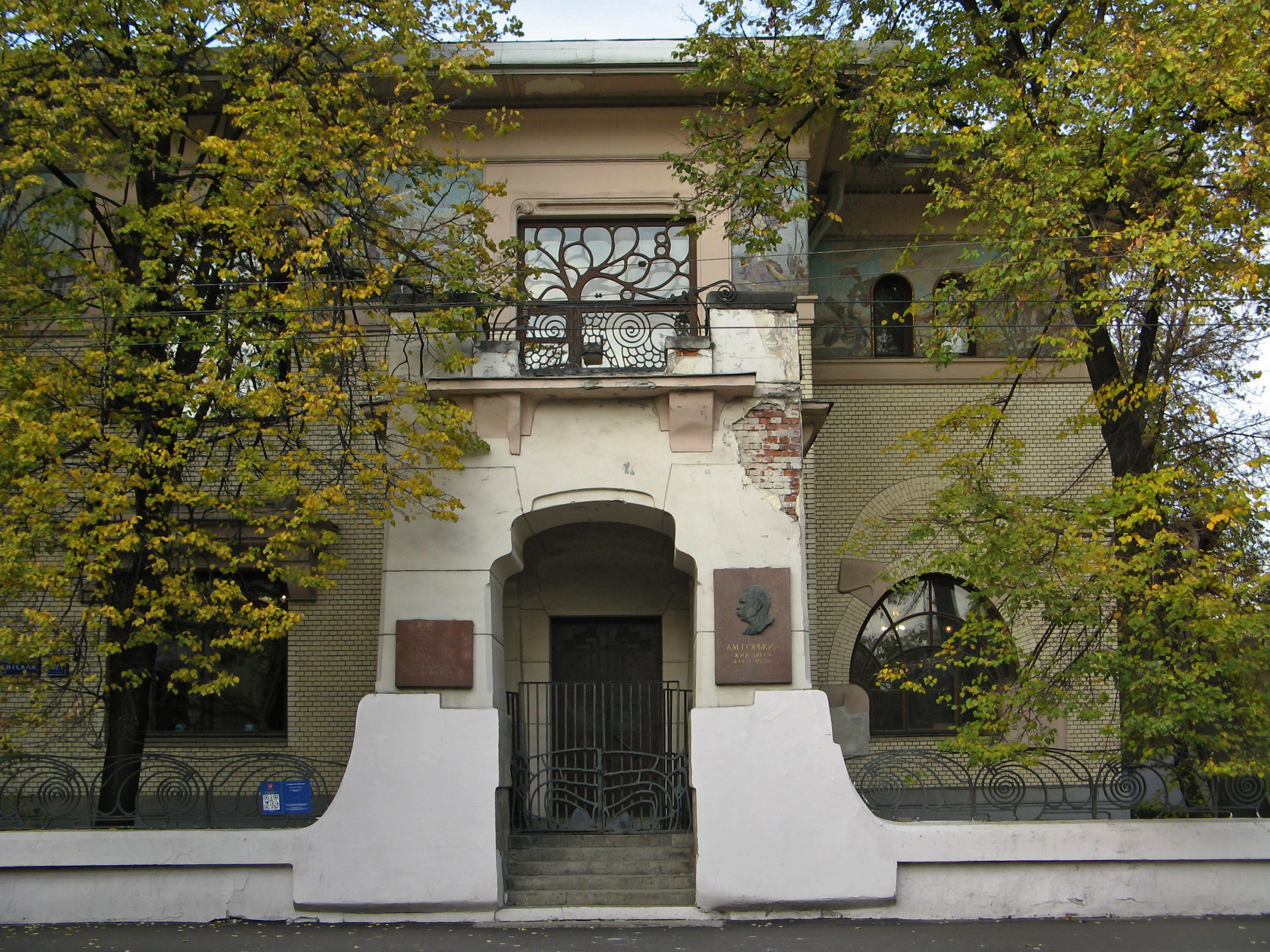
Ryabushinsky House in Moscow by Fyodor Schechtel (1900)

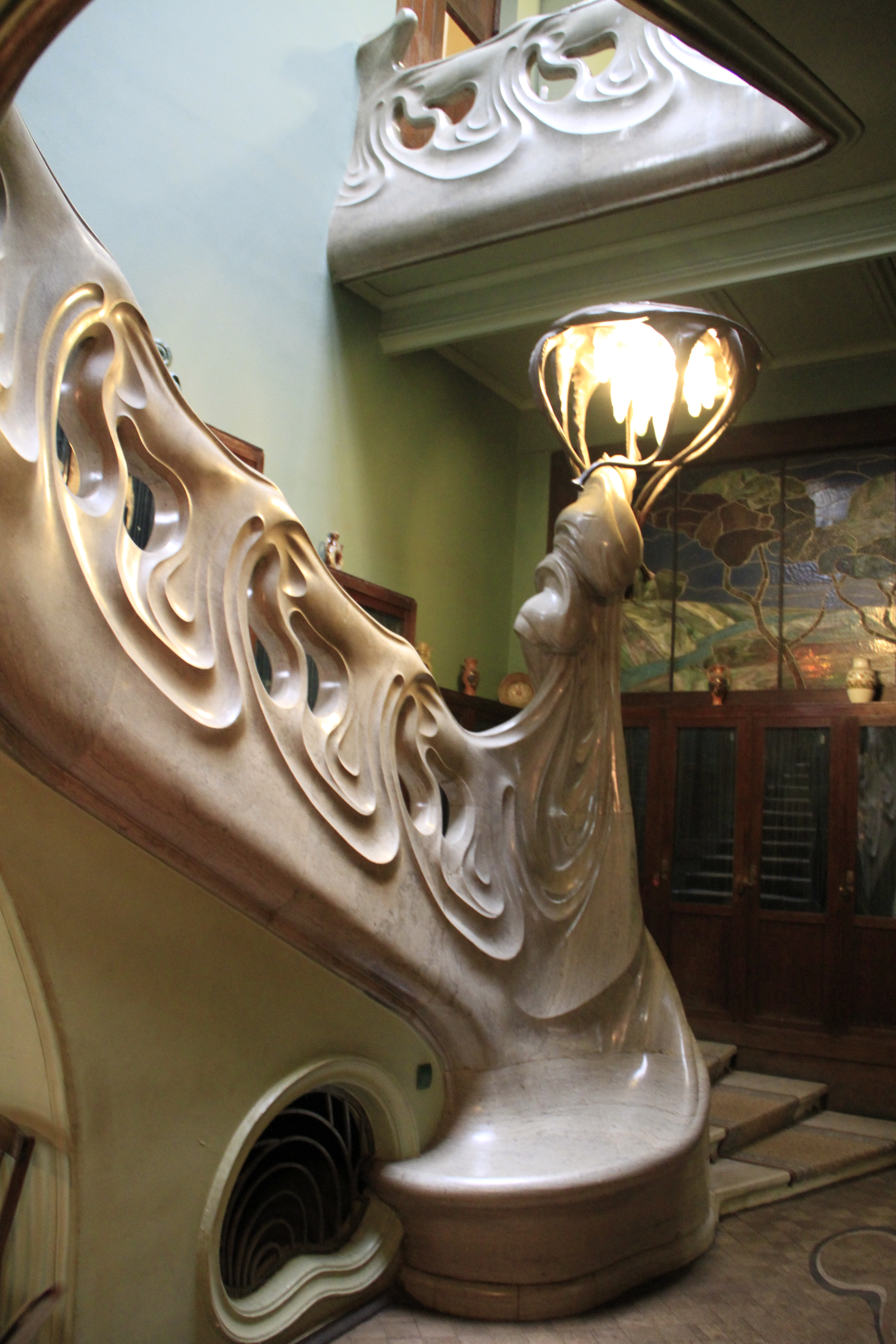
Main staircase of Ryabushinsky House in Moscow by Schechtel (1900)

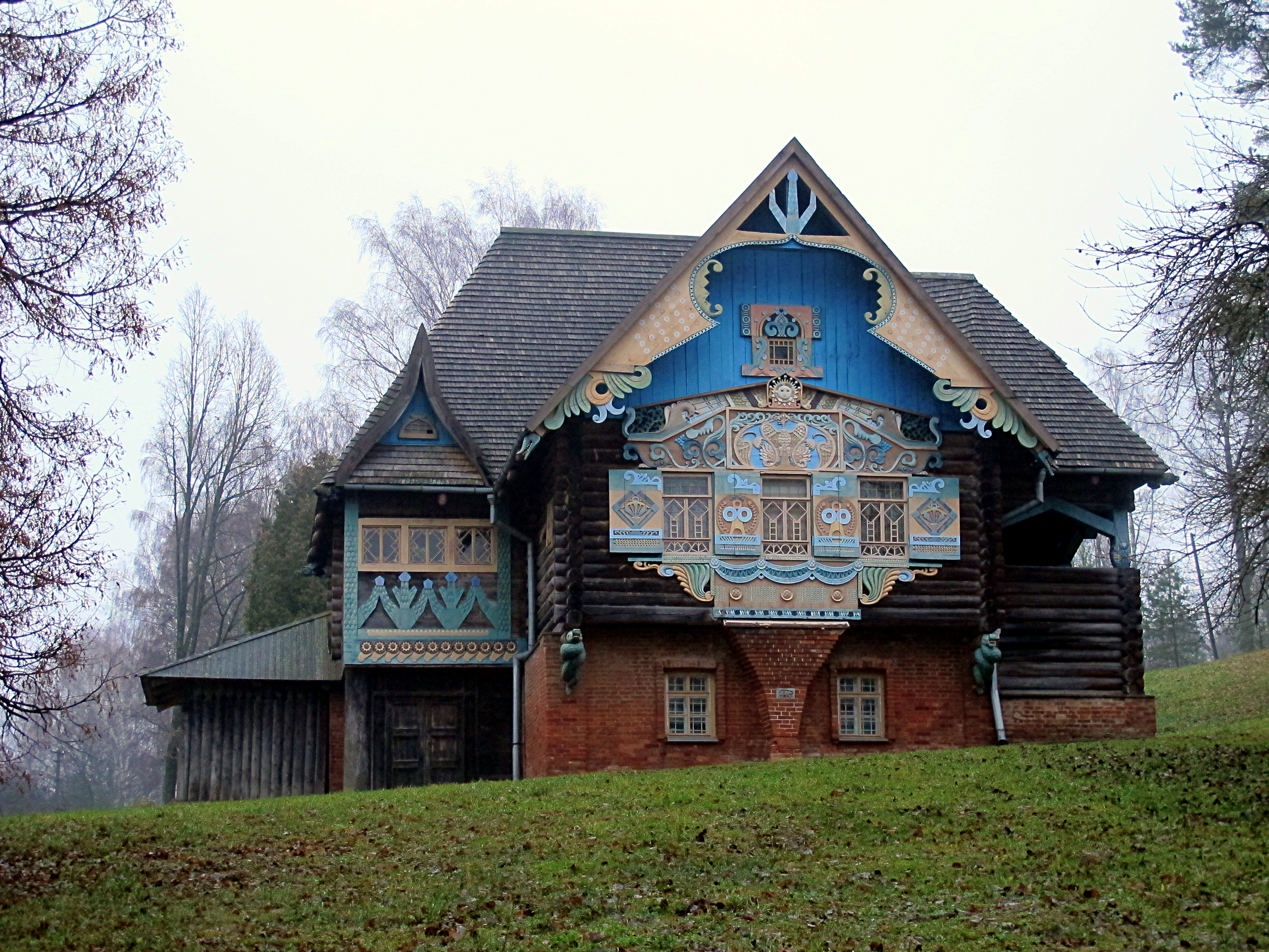
Teremok House in Talashkino, a Russian Revival work by Sergey Malyutin (1901–02)

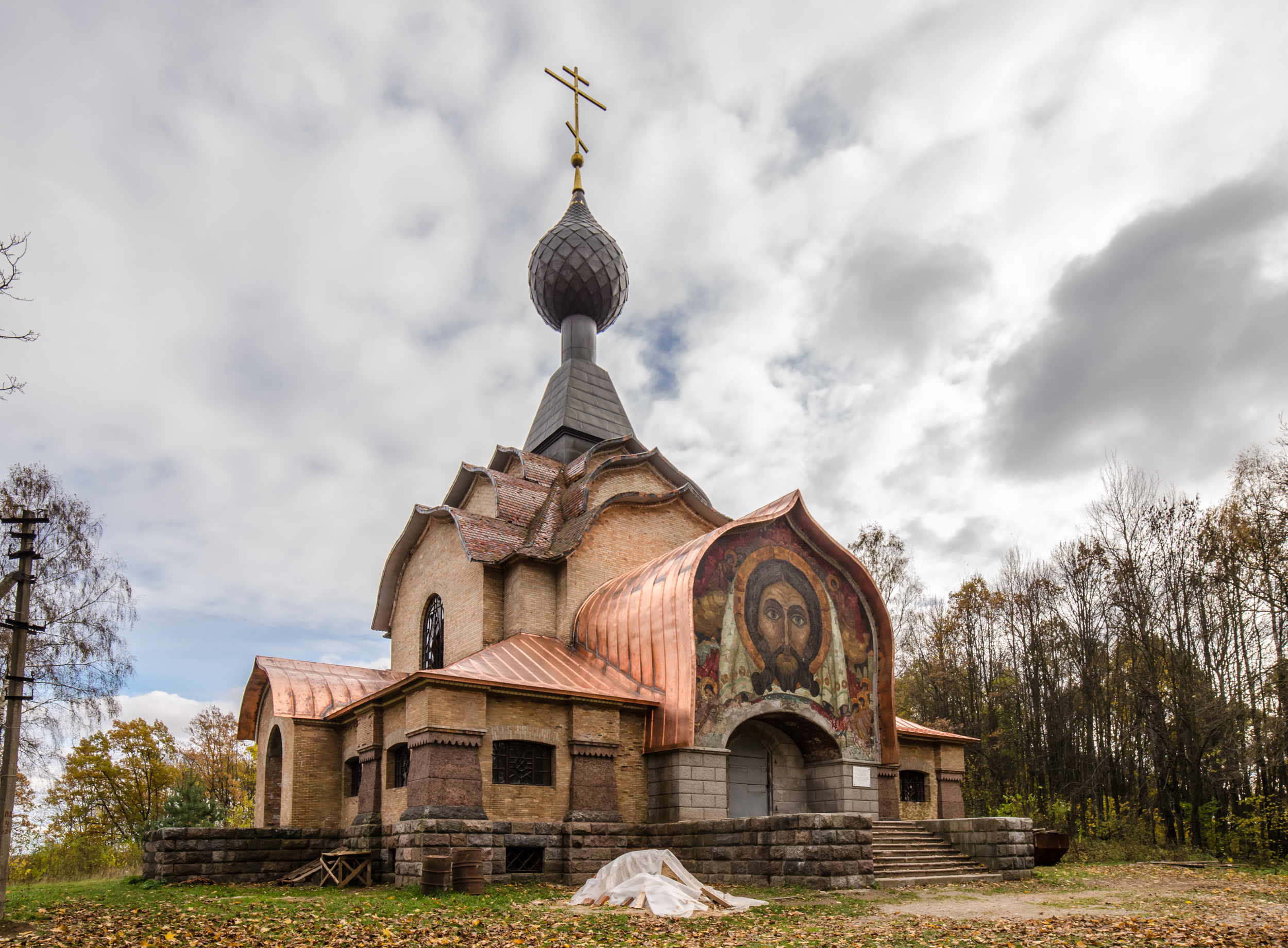
Holy Spirit Church in Talashkino by Malyutin (1903–1906)

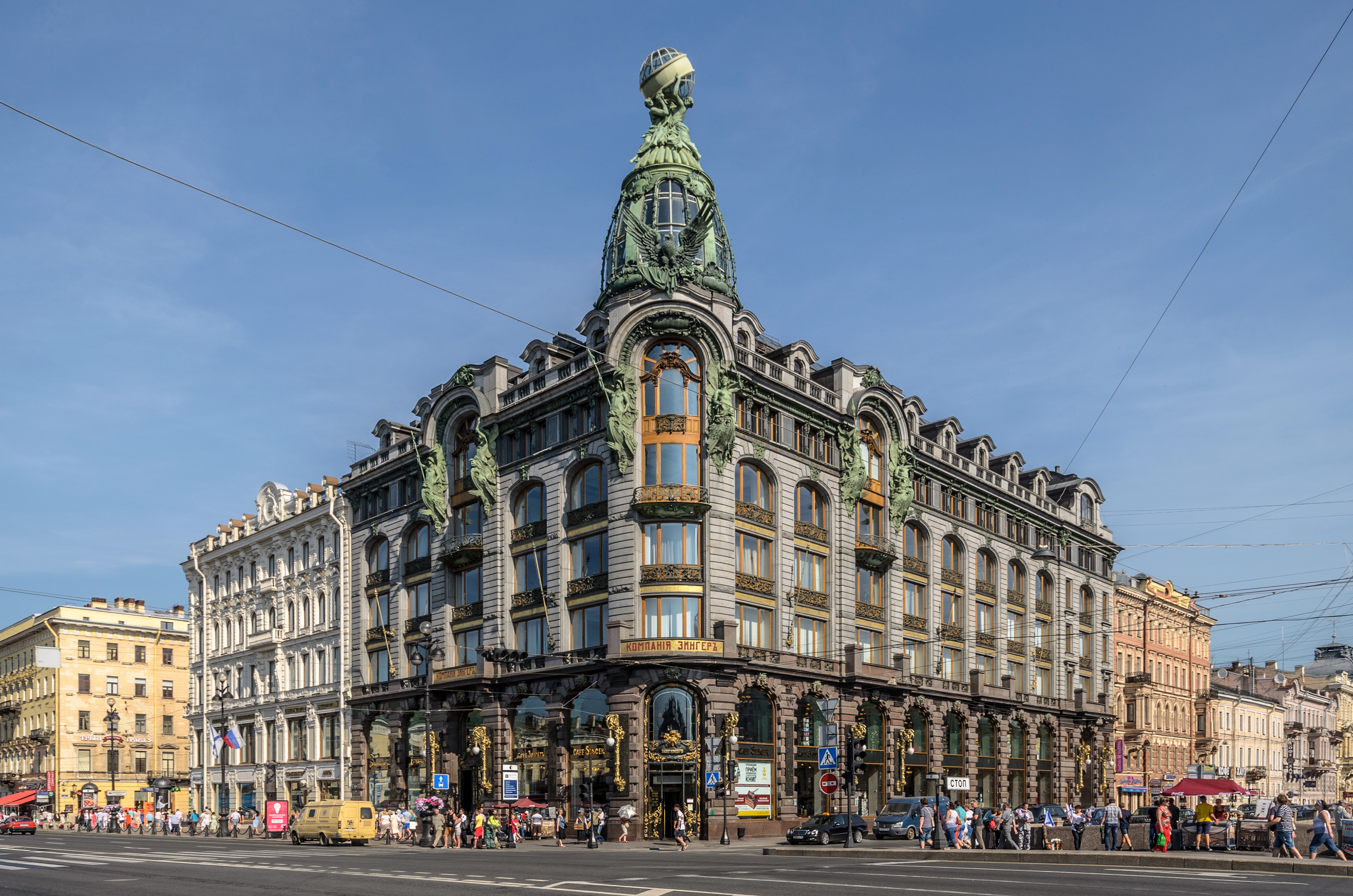
Singer House in Saint-Petersburg by Pavel Suzor (1904)

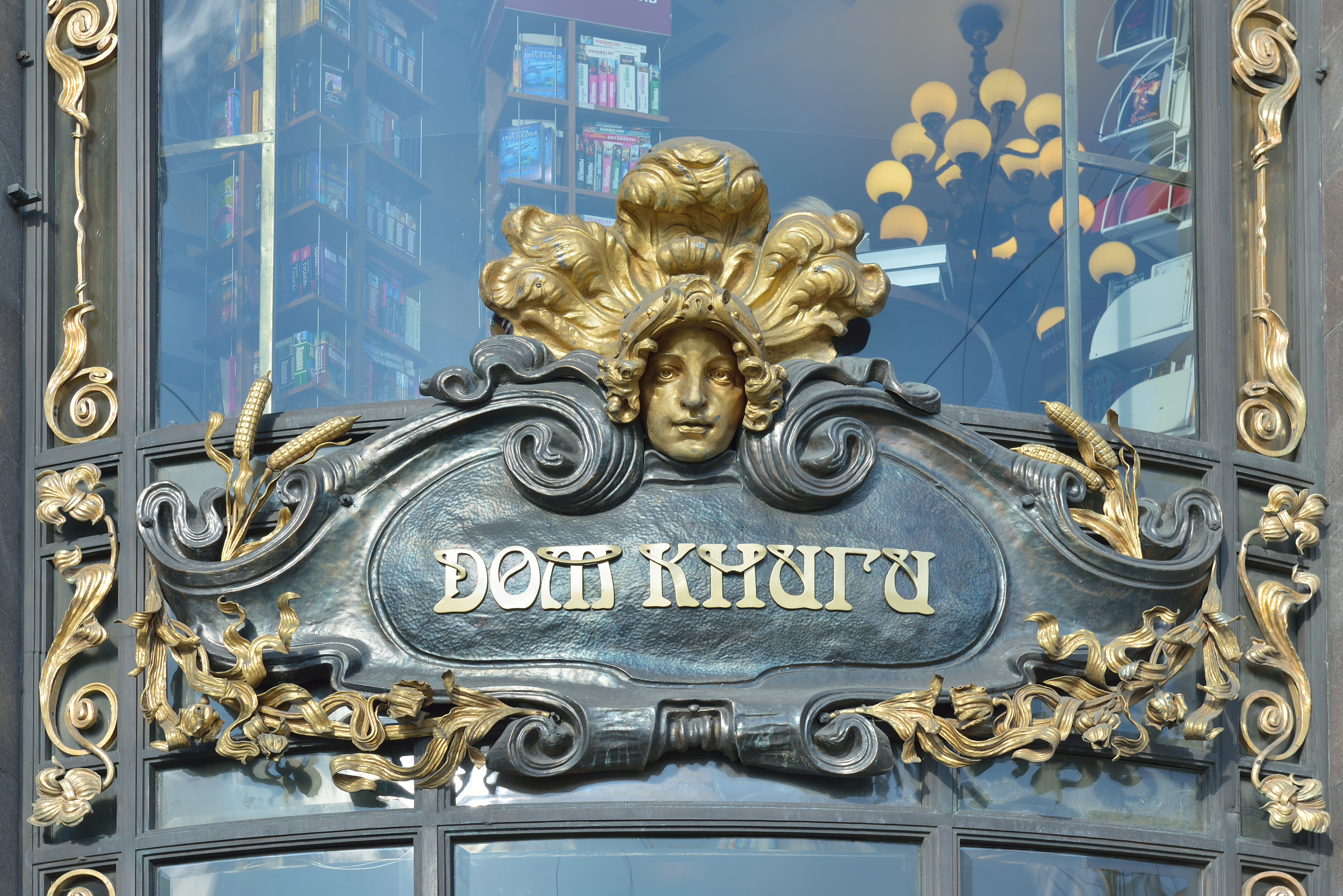
Cartouche with a mascaron, on the façade of the Singer House

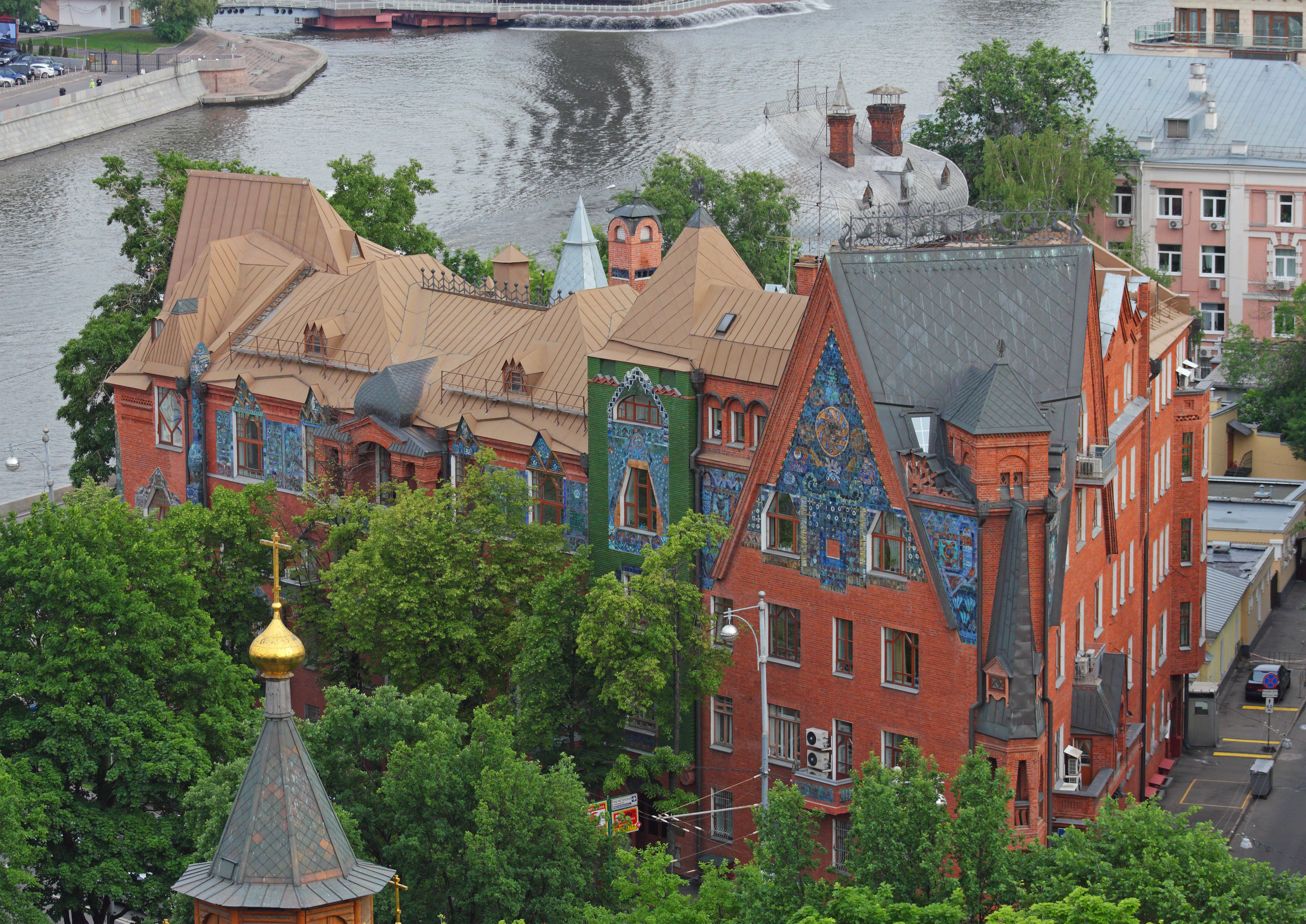
Pertsova House in Moscow by Malyutin (1905–1907)

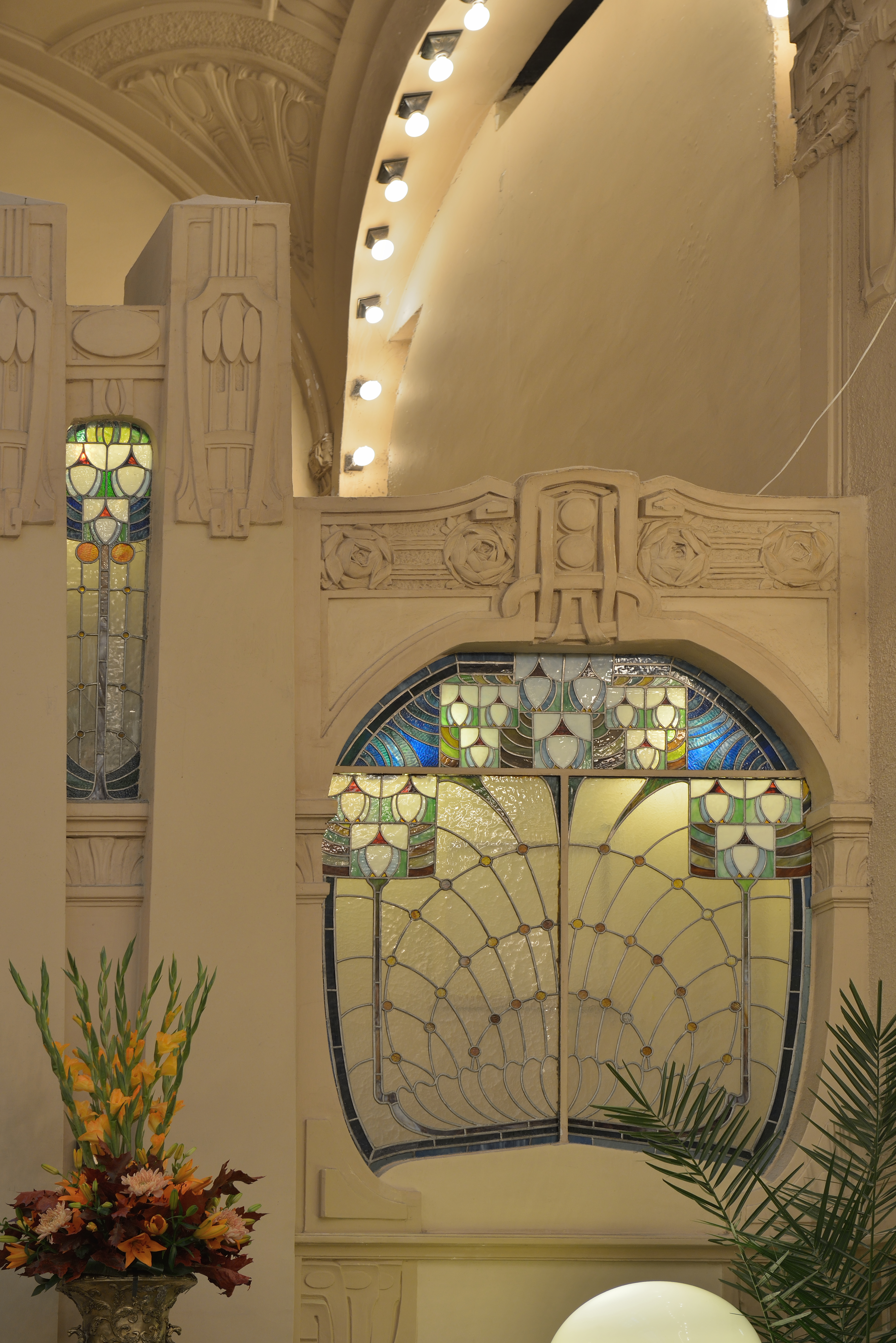
Dining room of the Grand Hotel Europe in Saint Petersburg (1910)

Other Russian architects of the period created Russian Revival architecture, which drew from historic Russian architecture. These buildings were created mostly in wood, and referred to the Architecture of Kievan Rus'. One example is the Teremok House in Talashkino (1901–1902) by Sergey Malyutin, and Pertsova House (also known as Pertsov House) in Moscow (1905–1907). He also was a member of Mir iskusstva movement. The Saint Petersburg architect Nikolai Vasilyev built in a range of styles before emigrating in 1923. This building is most notable for stone carvings made by Sergei Vashkov inspired by the carvings of Cathedral of Saint Demetrius in Vladimir and Saint George Cathedral in Yuryev-Polsky of the 12th and 13th centuries. Another example of this Russian Revival architecture is the Marfo-Mariinsky Convent (1908–1912), an updated Russian Orthodox Church by Alexey Shchusev, who later, ironically, designed Lenin's Mausoleum in Moscow.

Several art colonies in Russia in this period were built in the Russian Revival style. The two best-known colonies were Abramtsevo, funded by Savva Mamontov, and Talashkino, Smolensk Governorate, funded by Princess Maria Tenisheva.

=== Ukrainian Modern architecture ===
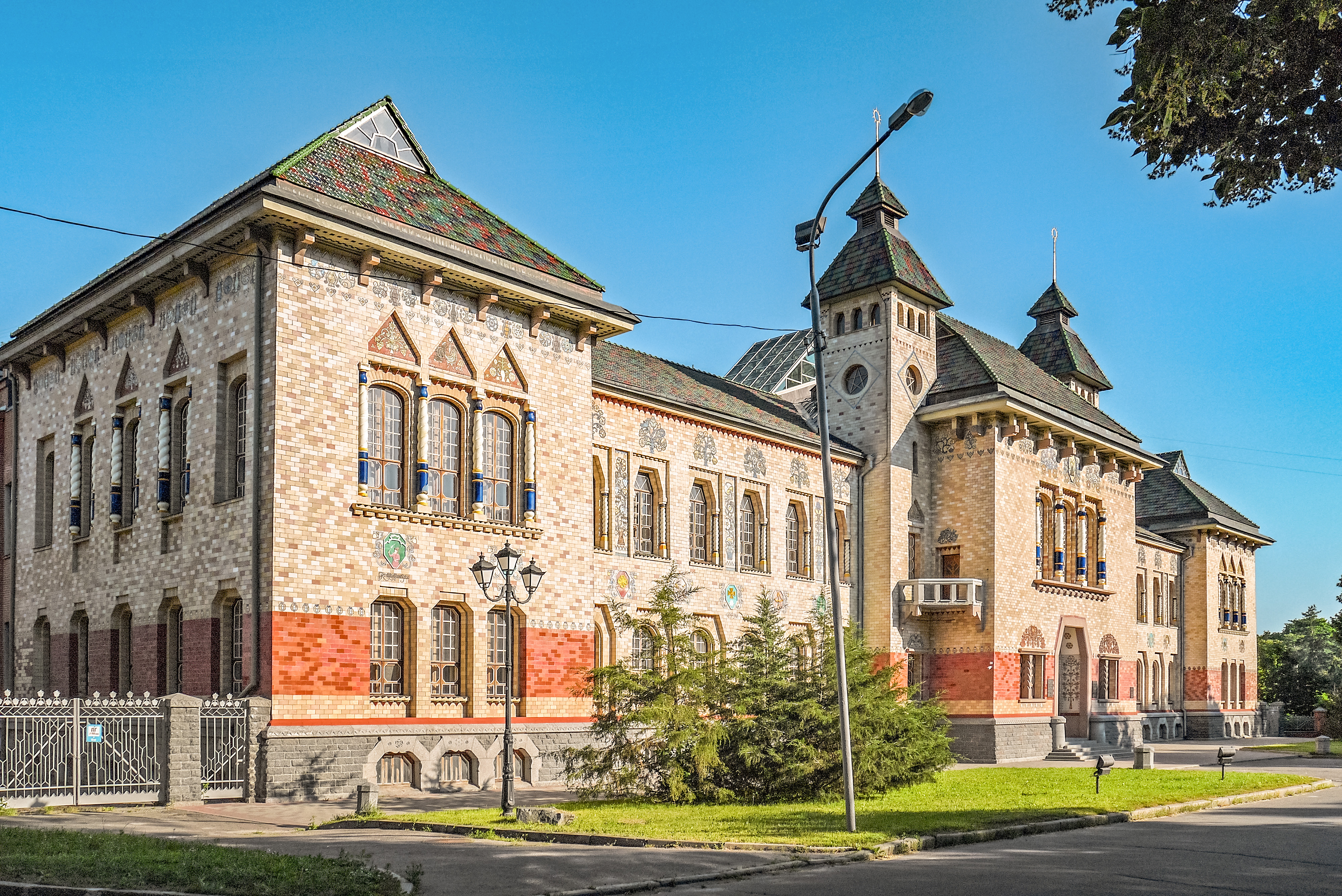
Zemstvo Building in Poltava by Vasyl Krychevskyi (1903–1908)

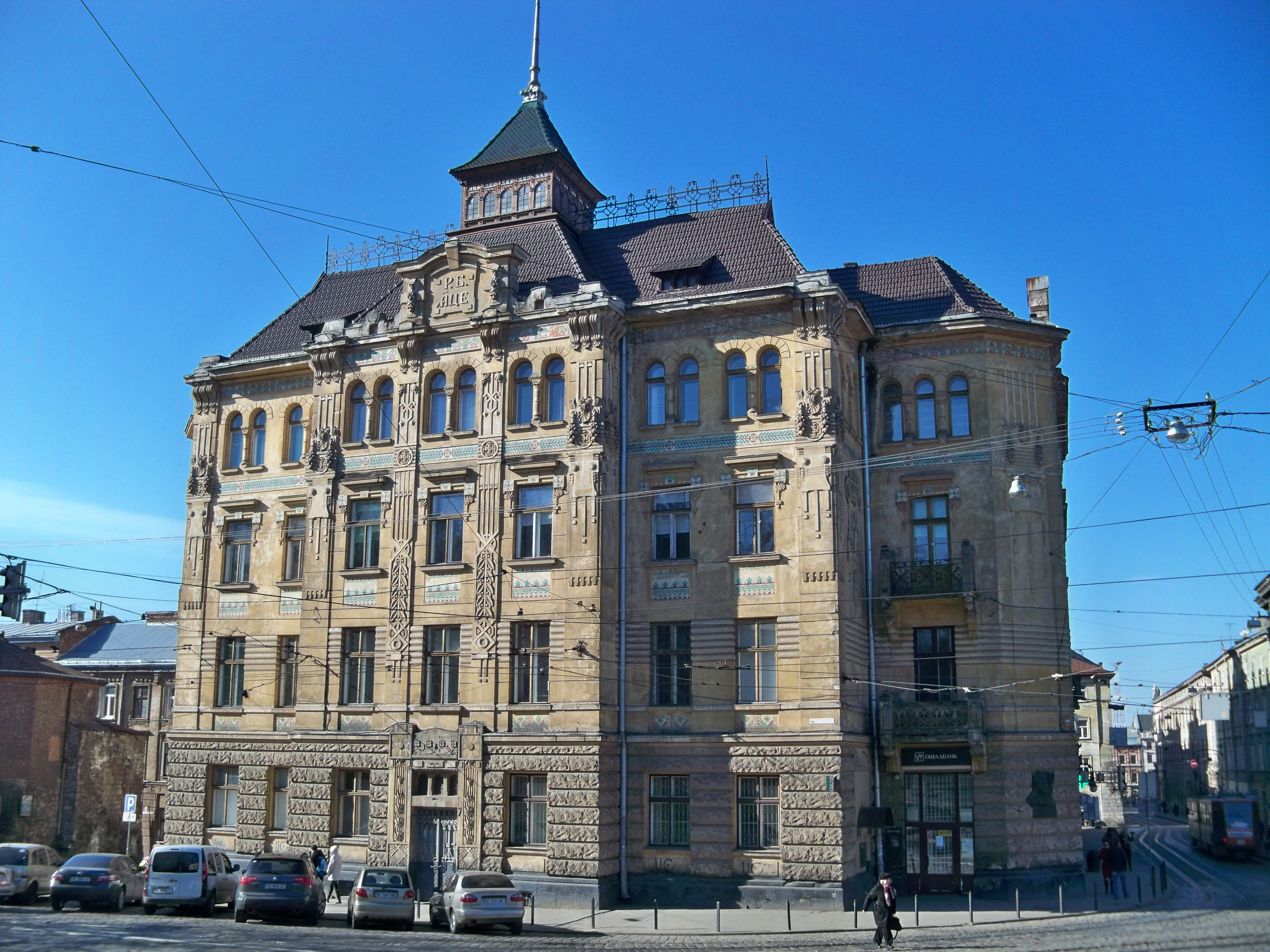
Dnister credit society building in Lviv by Ivan Levynskyi (1905–06)

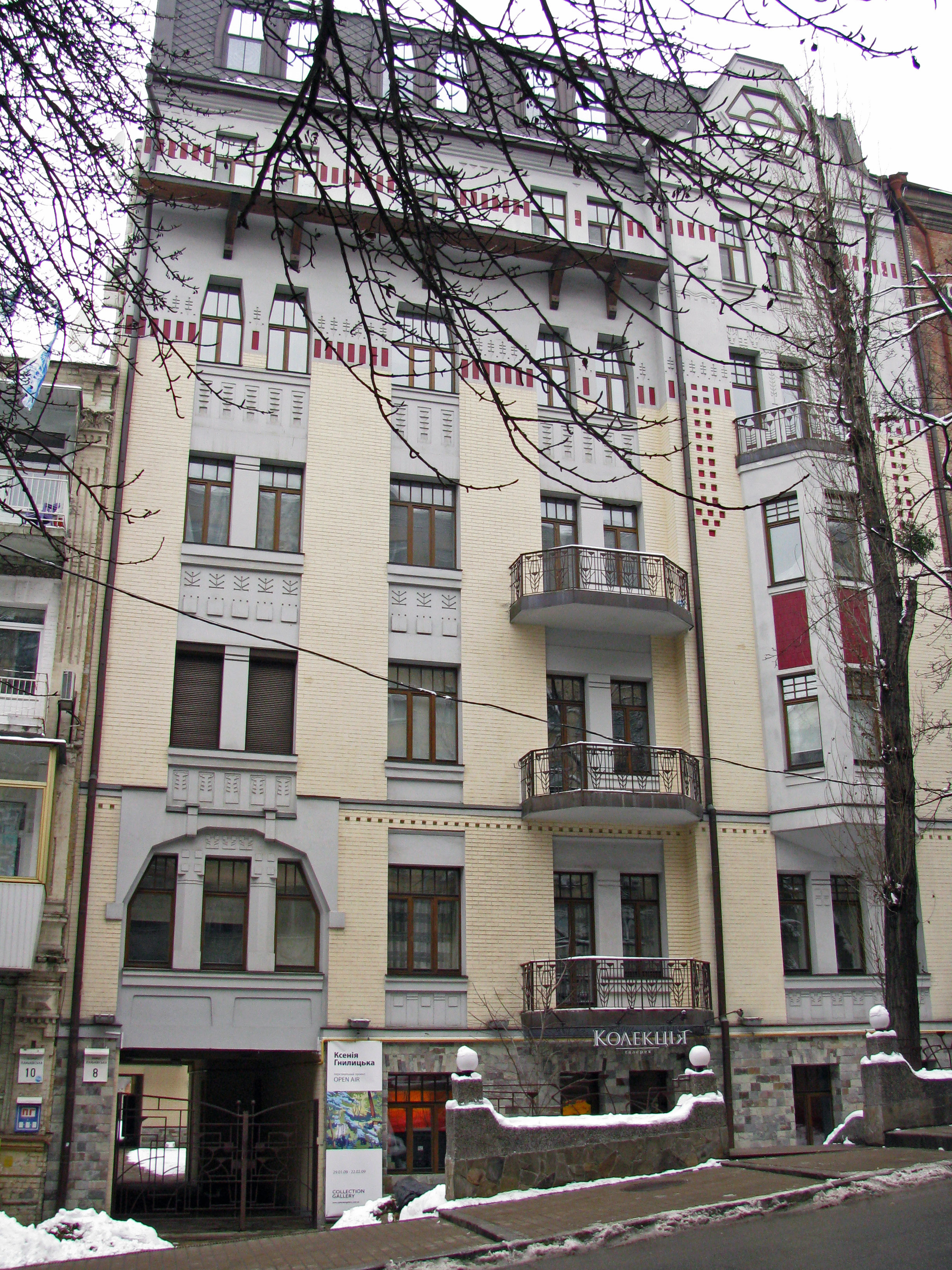
Building on Pankivska Street, 8 in Kyiv by Mykola Shekhonin (1909–1914)

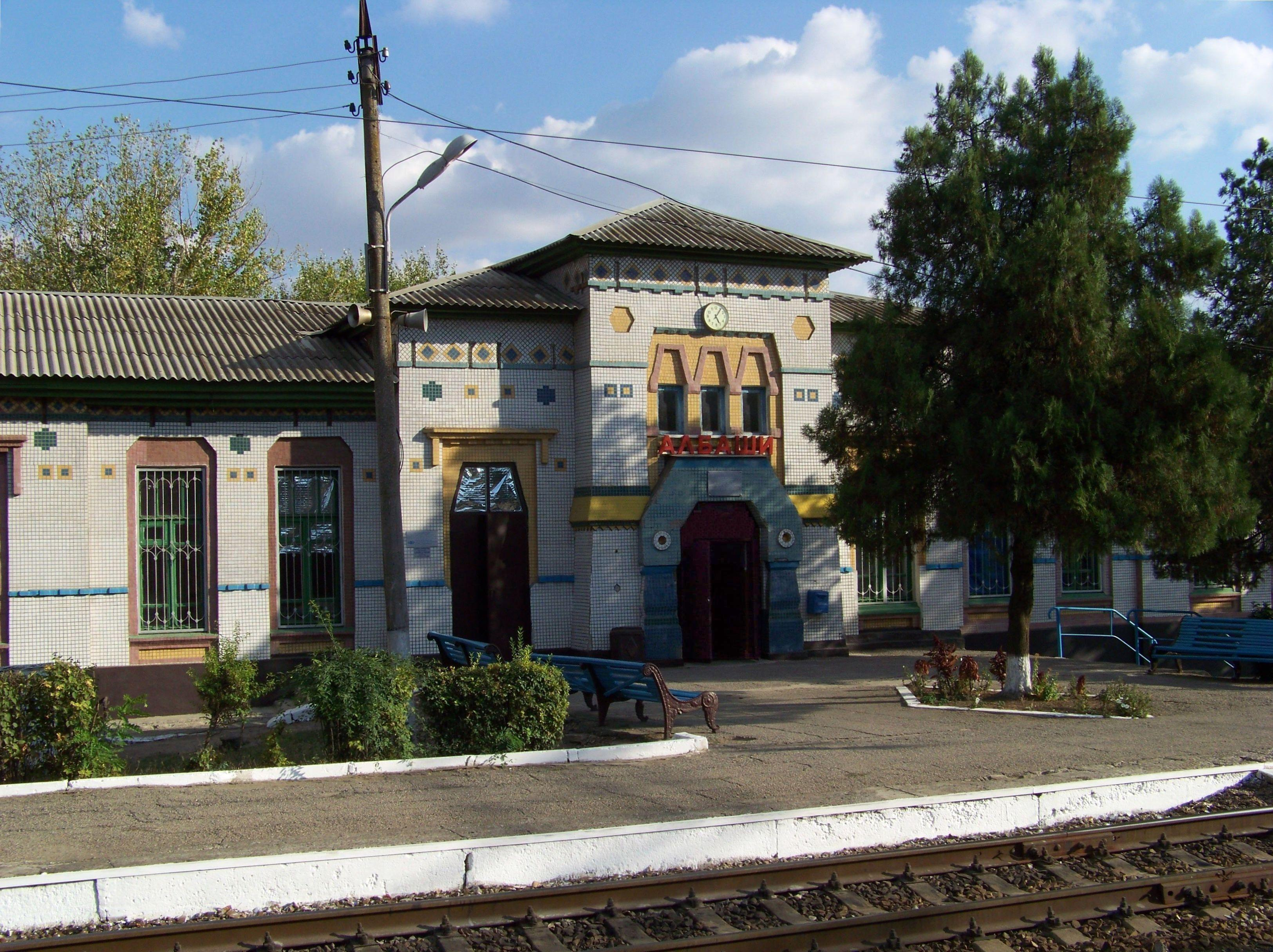
Albashy railway station in Krasnodar Krai, Southern Russia (historic Kuban region) by Serhiy Tymoshenko (1910)

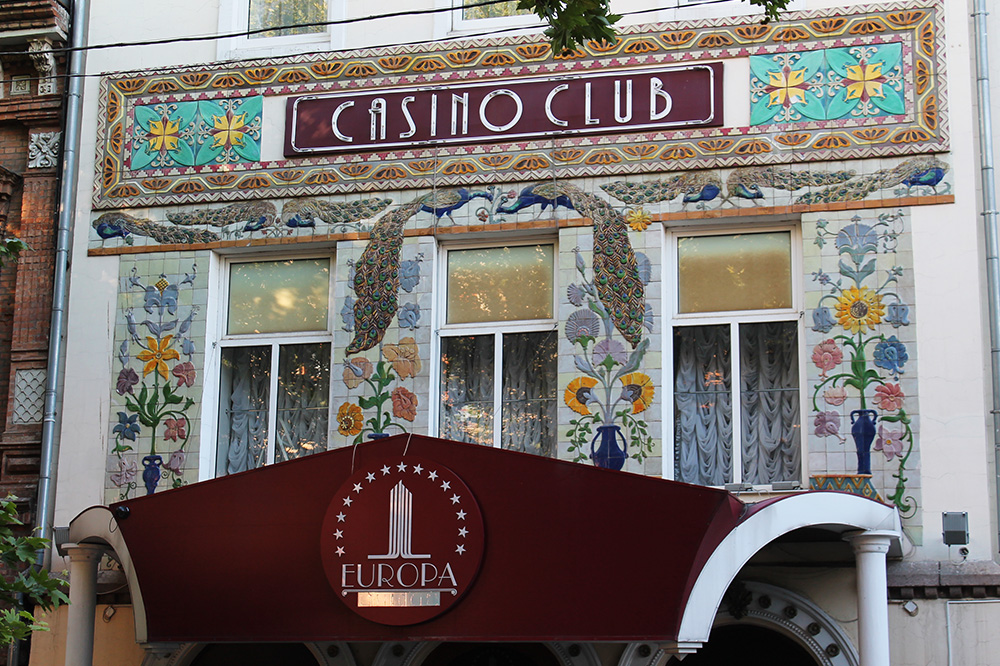
Khrennikov House (now Hotel Ukraine) in Dnipro by P. Fetisov and L. Khoinovskyi (1910–1913), detail

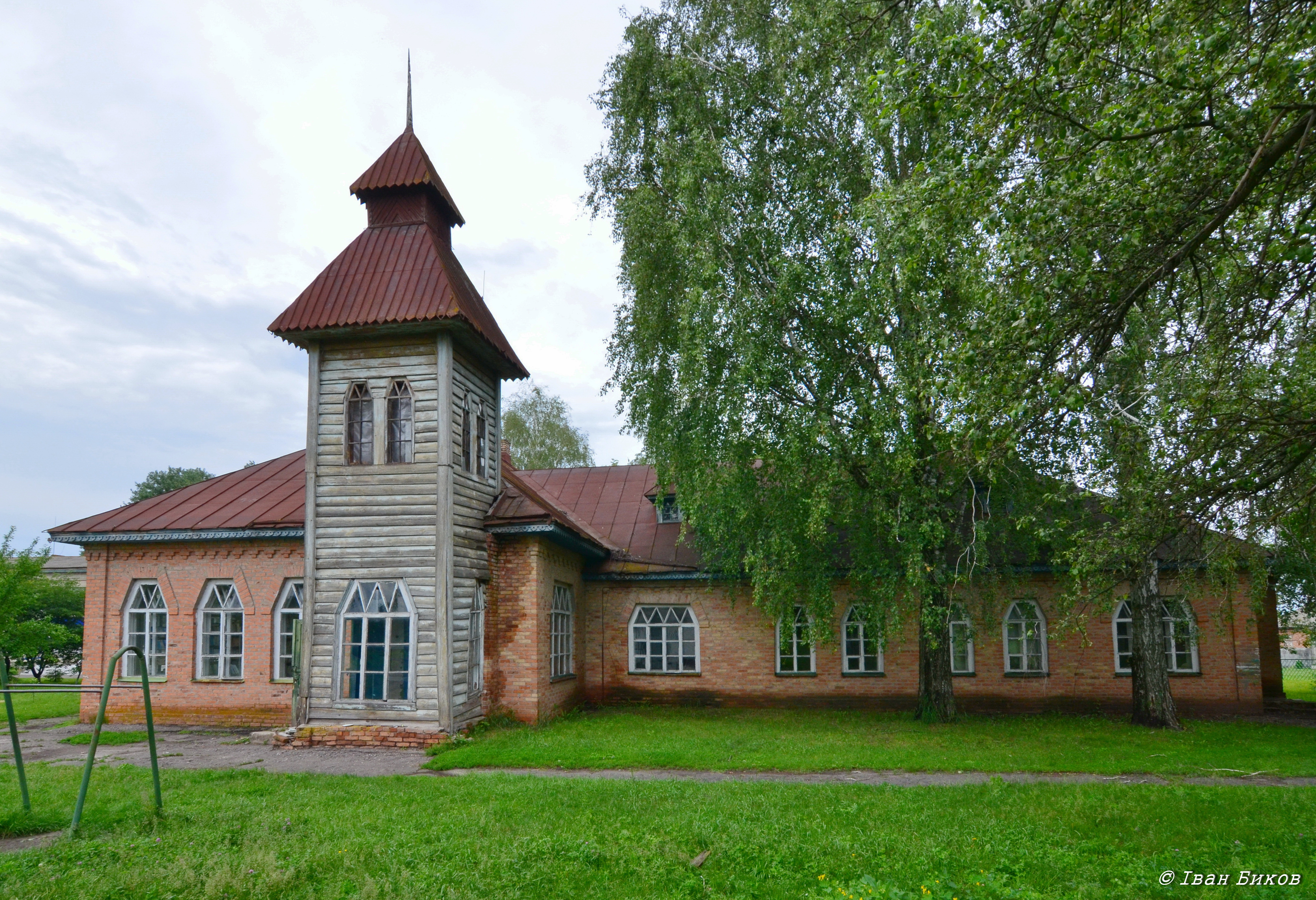
Zemstvo school in Kizlivka, Poltava Oblast by Opanas Slastion (1912)

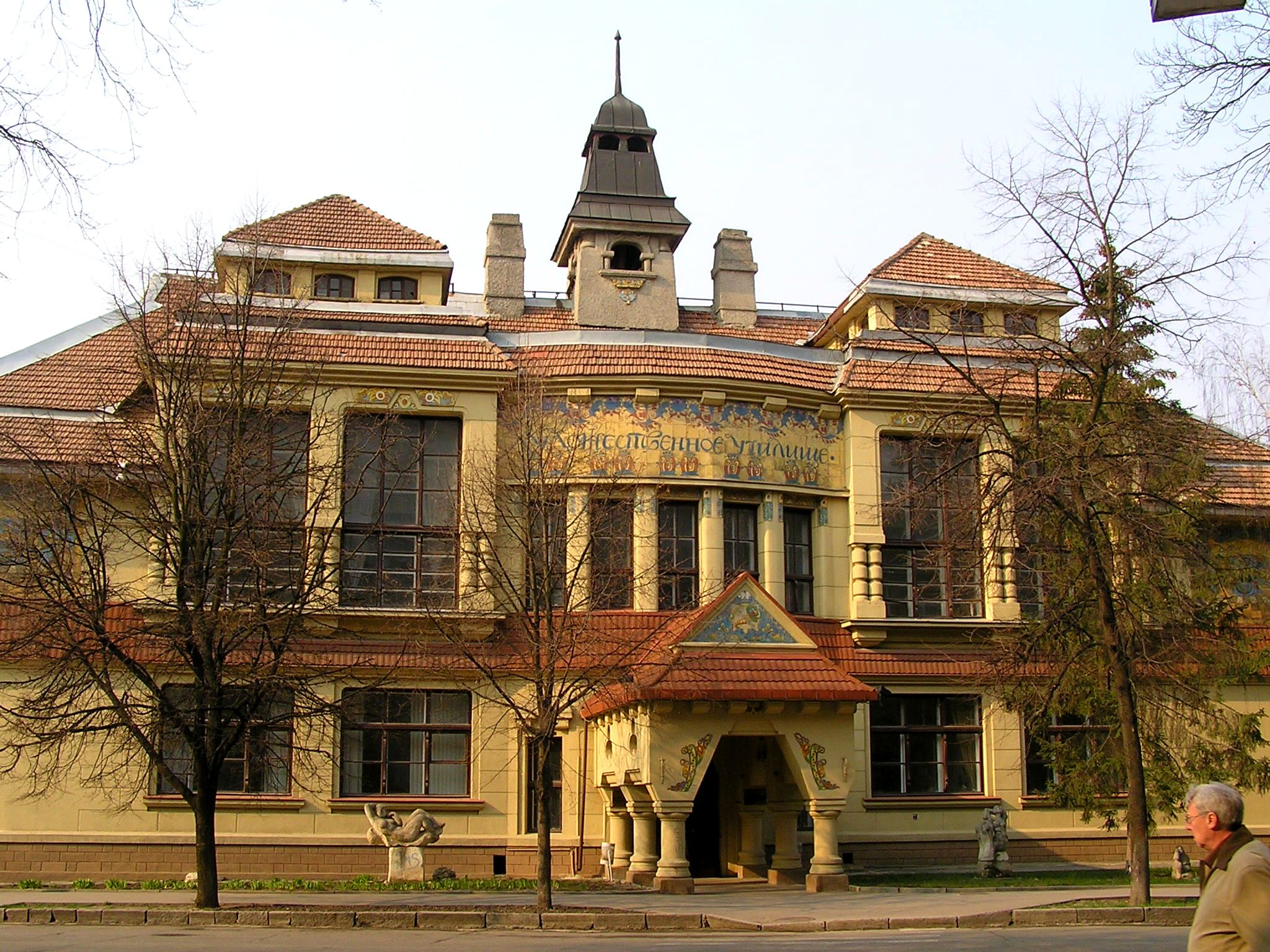
Kharkiv State Academy of Design and Arts (1913)

Early 20th-century architecture in Ukrainian lands (southwestern part of the Russian Empire, Eastern Galicia, Bukovina and Transcarpathia in Austria-Hungary) developed under the influence of Ukrainian folk architecture, as well as trends of European Art Nouveau, such as Zakopane Style. Ukrainian "modern" architecture first came to prominence in Poltava Governorate, where its most active promoters were Vasyl Krychevskyi and Opanas Slastion. In the late 1900s and early 1910s, a number of buildings in what was then known simply as "Ukrainian style" were constructed in Kyiv, Kharkiv, Odesa, Katerynoslav and a number of other places in the Russian Empire. In Western Ukraine, which was at that time part of Austria-Hungary, the local Ukrainian style was influenced by Hutsul architecture, as well as Western European trends and influences from Great Ukraine.

=== Jūgendstils (Art Nouveau in Riga) ===
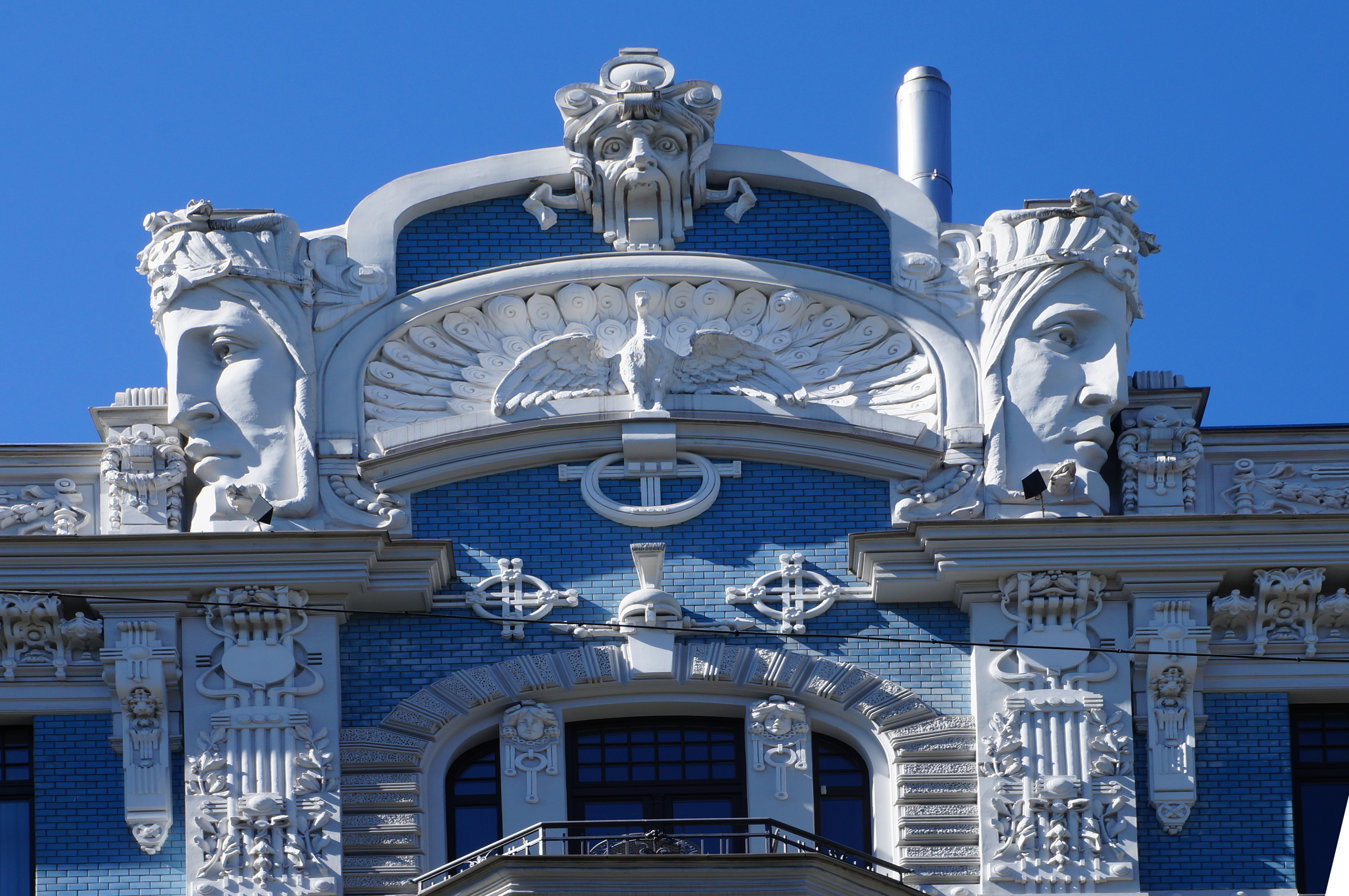
Façade of house at Elizabetes ielā, 10b, by Mikhail Eisenstein (1903)

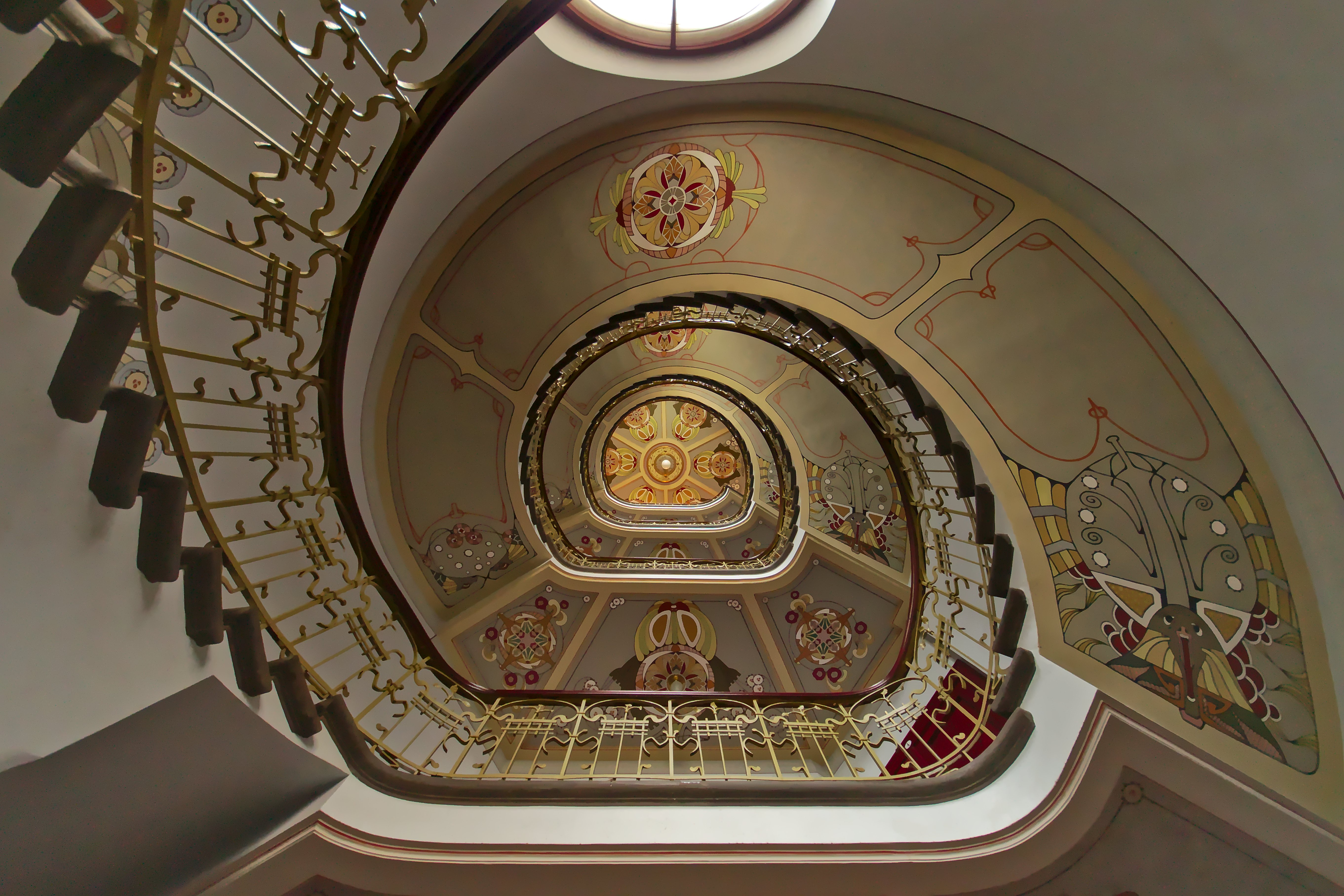
Stairway in Pēkšēns House by Konstantīns Pēkšēns (1903), now hosting Riga Jūgendstils museum

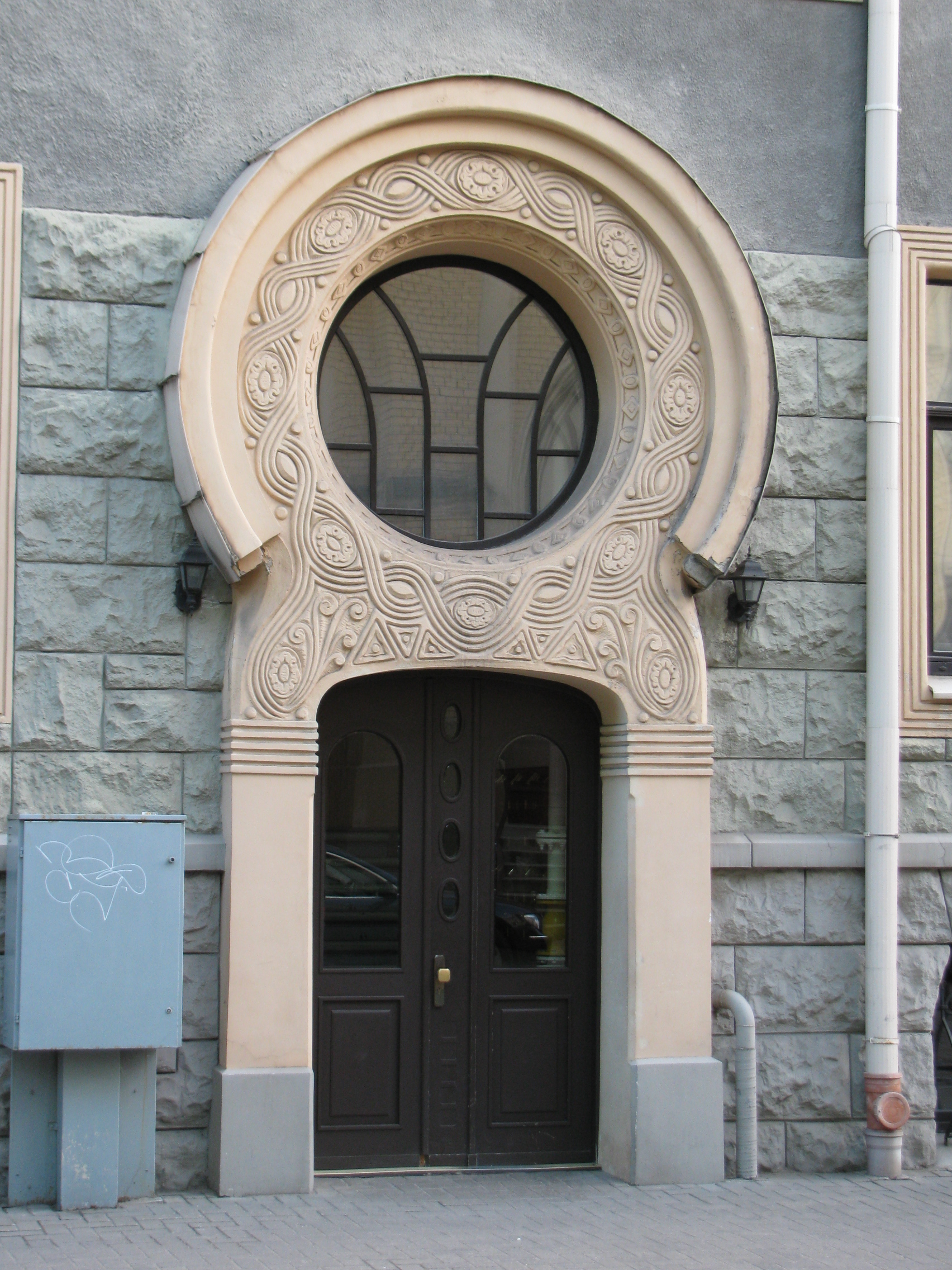
National Romantic decoration on a house built by Pēkšēns (1908)

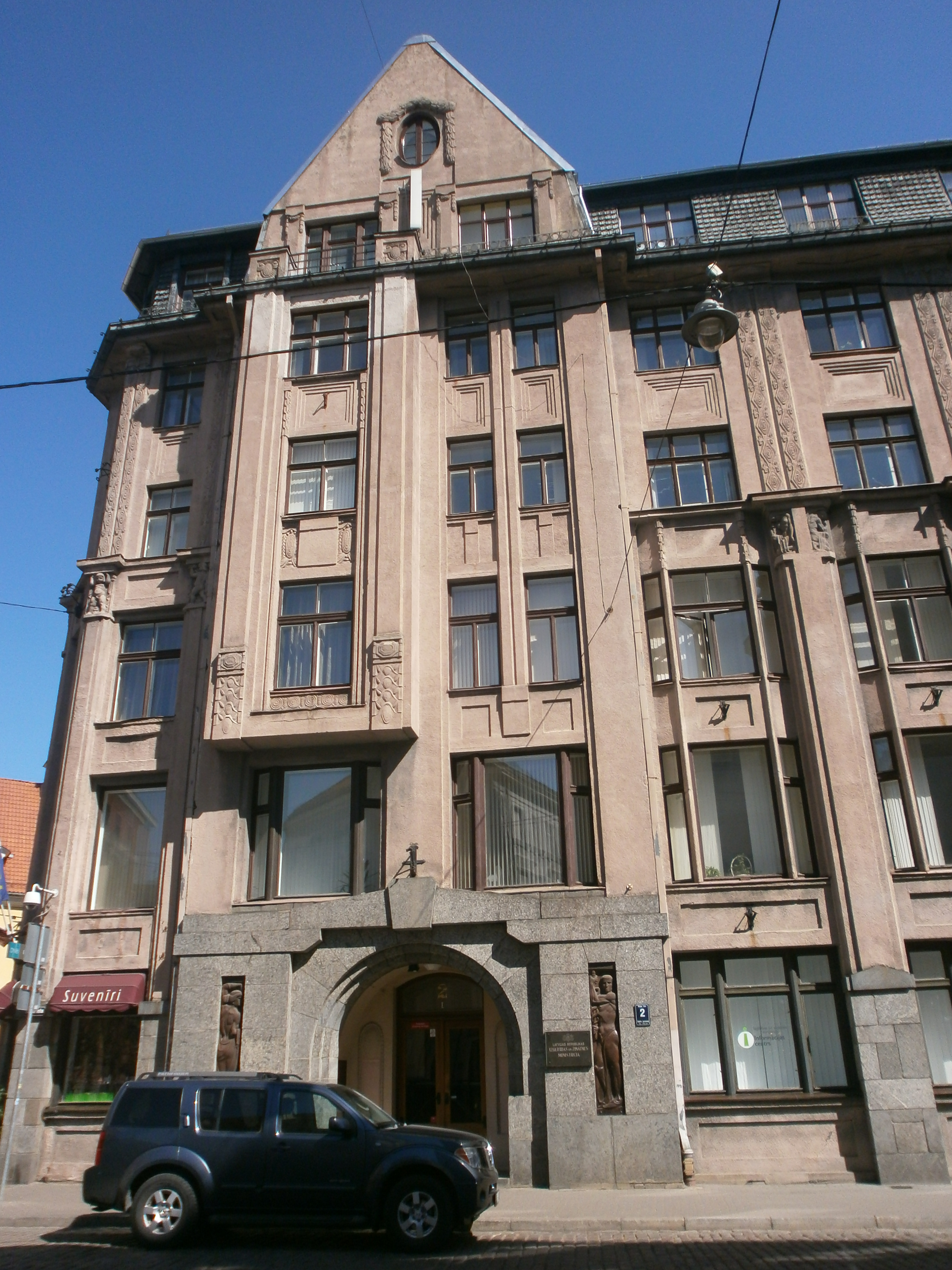
Ministry of Education, built by Edgar Friesendorf (1911)

Riga, the present-day capital of Latvia, was at the time one of the major cities of the Russian Empire. Art Nouveau architecture in Riga nevertheless developed according to its own dynamics, and the style became overwhelmingly popular in the city. Soon after the Latvian Ethnographic Exhibition in 1896 and the Industrial and Handicrafts Exhibition in 1901, Art Nouveau became the dominant style in the city. Thus Art Nouveau architecture accounts for one-third of all the buildings in the centre of Riga, making it the city with the highest concentration of such buildings anywhere in the world. The quantity and quality of Art Nouveau architecture was among the criteria for including Riga in UNESCO World Cultural Heritage.

There were different variations of Art Nouveau architecture in Riga:

- in Eclectic Art Nouveau, floral and other nature-inspired elements of decoration were most popular. Examples of that variation are works of Mikhail Eisenstein,
- in Perpendicular Art Nouveau, geometrical ornaments were integrated into the vertical compositions of the façades. Several department stores were built in this style, and it is sometimes also referred to as "department store style" or Warenhausstil in German,
- National Romantic Art Nouveau was inspired by local folk art, monumental volumes and the use of natural building materials.

Some later Neo-Classical buildings also contained Art Nouveau details.

=== Style Sapin in La Chaux-de-Fonds, Switzerland ===
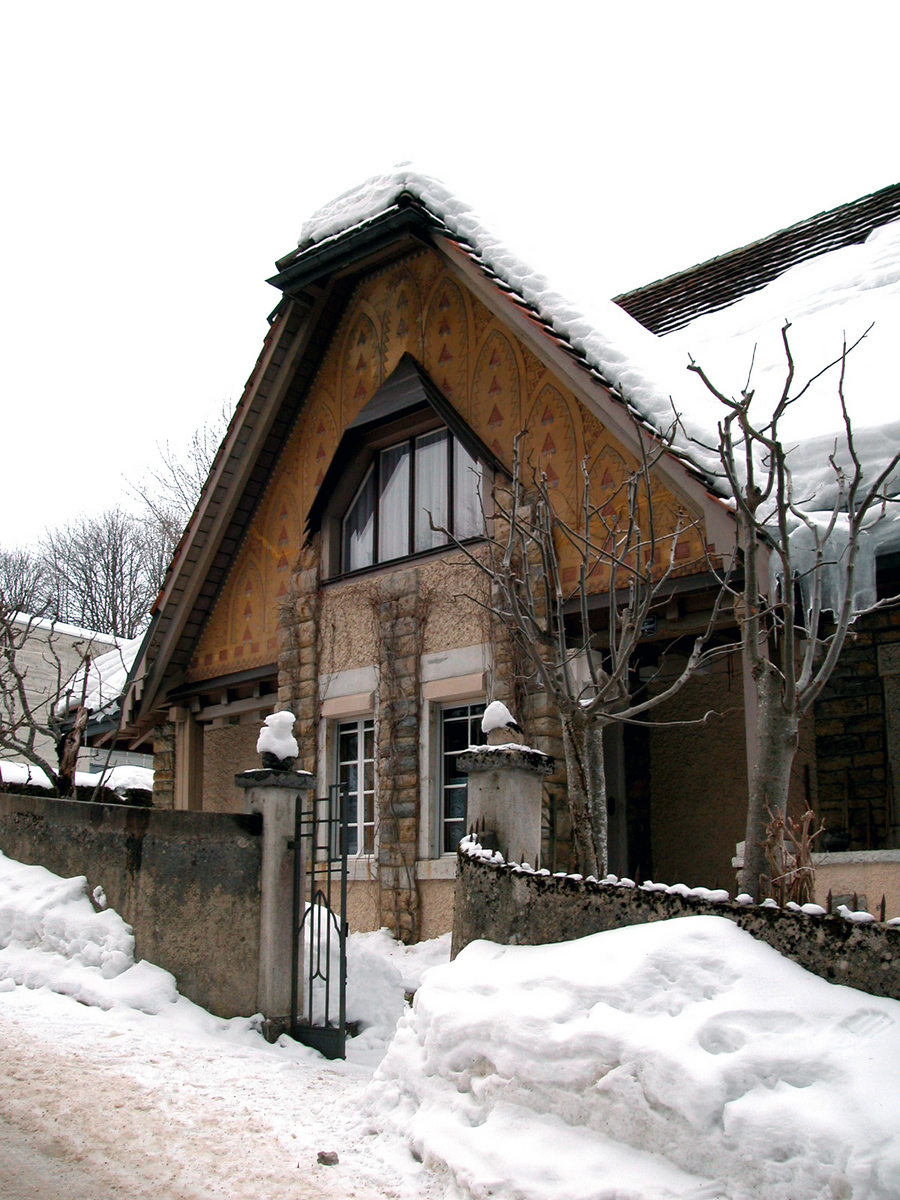
Villa Fallet with fir-inspired decoration by Le Corbusier (1904–05)

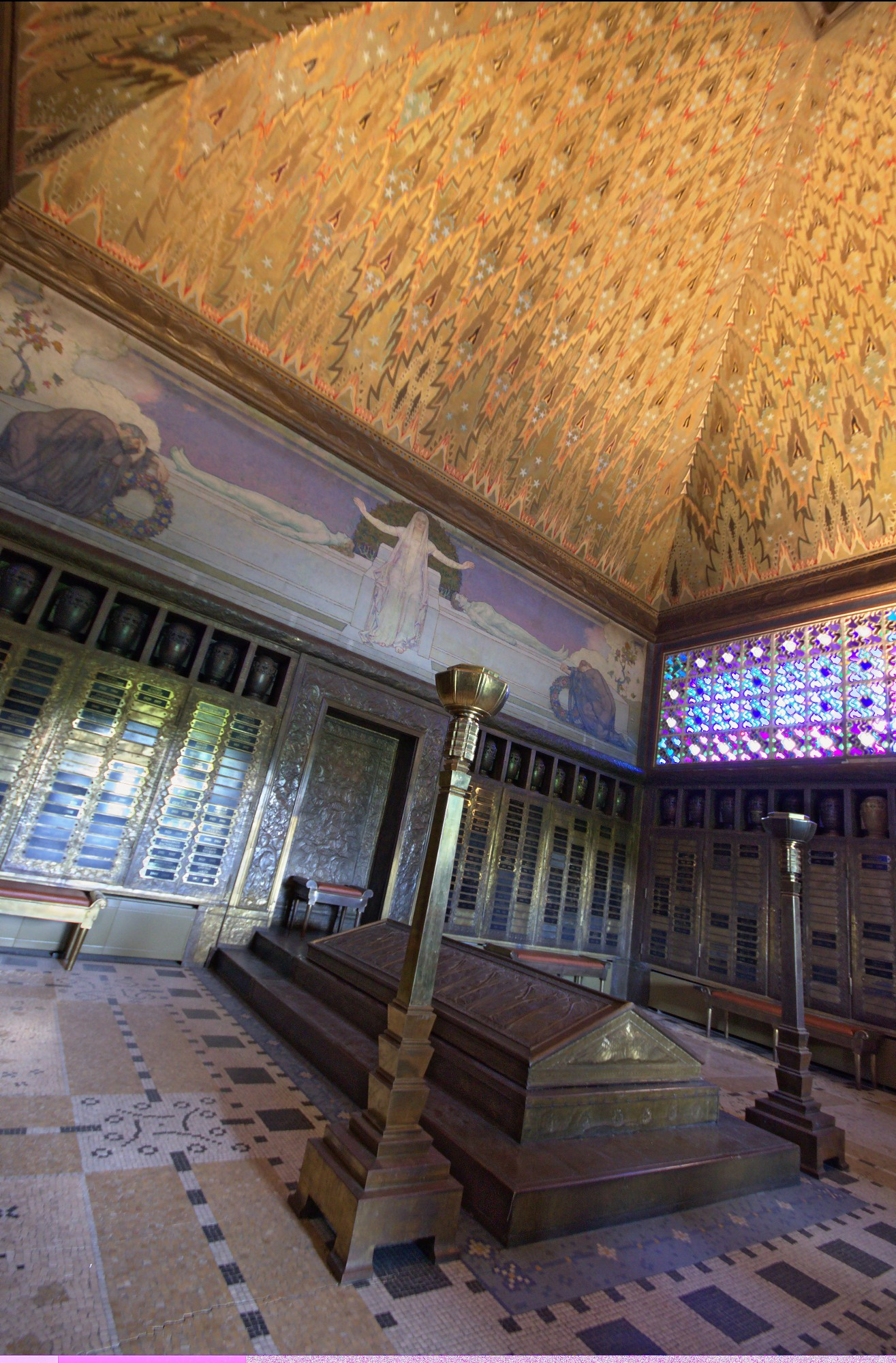
Crematorium (1908–1910), interior, with stylised fir tree design on ceiling. The symbolist murals by L'Epplattenier were added later.

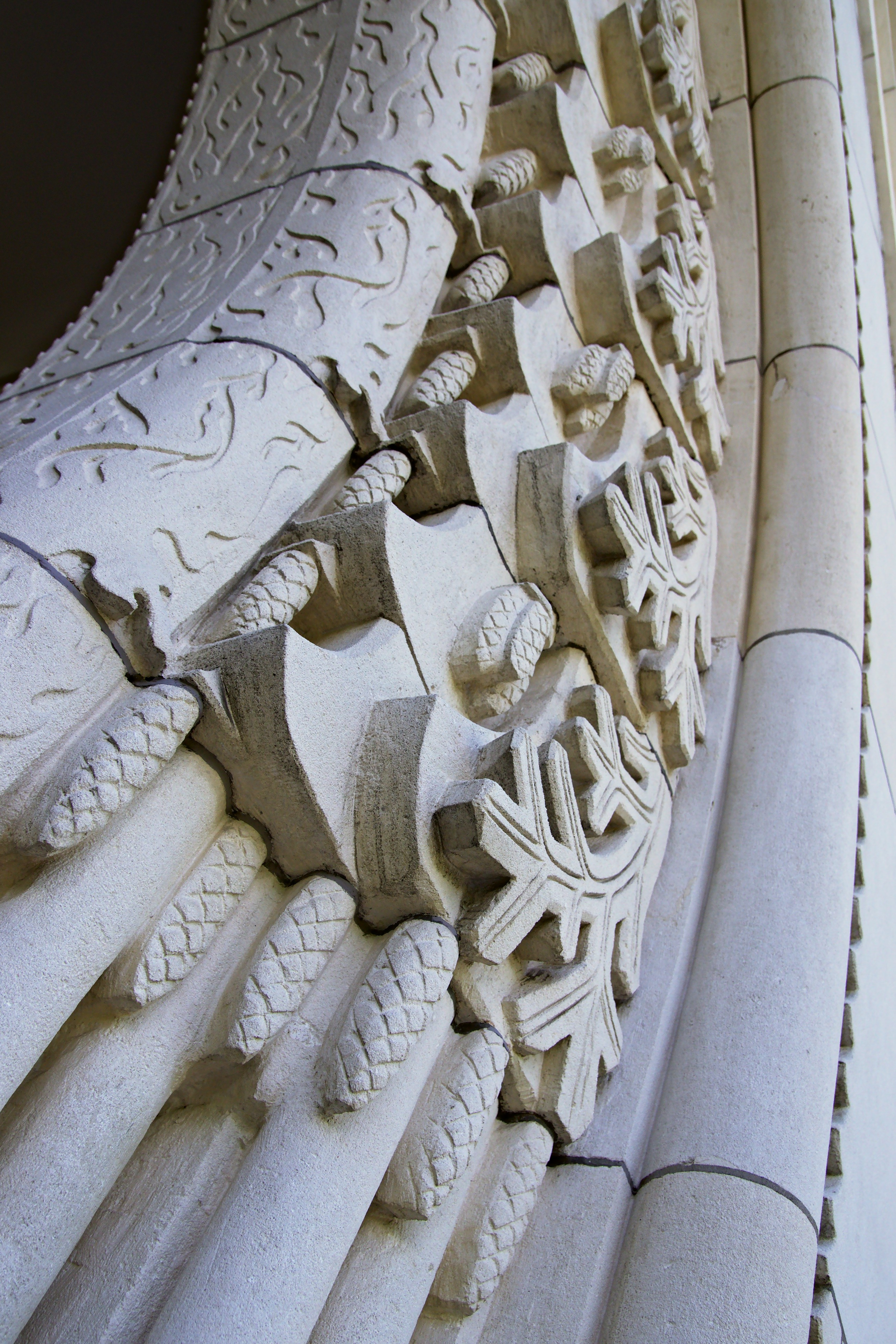
Crematorium, with stylised sapin or pine cone detail

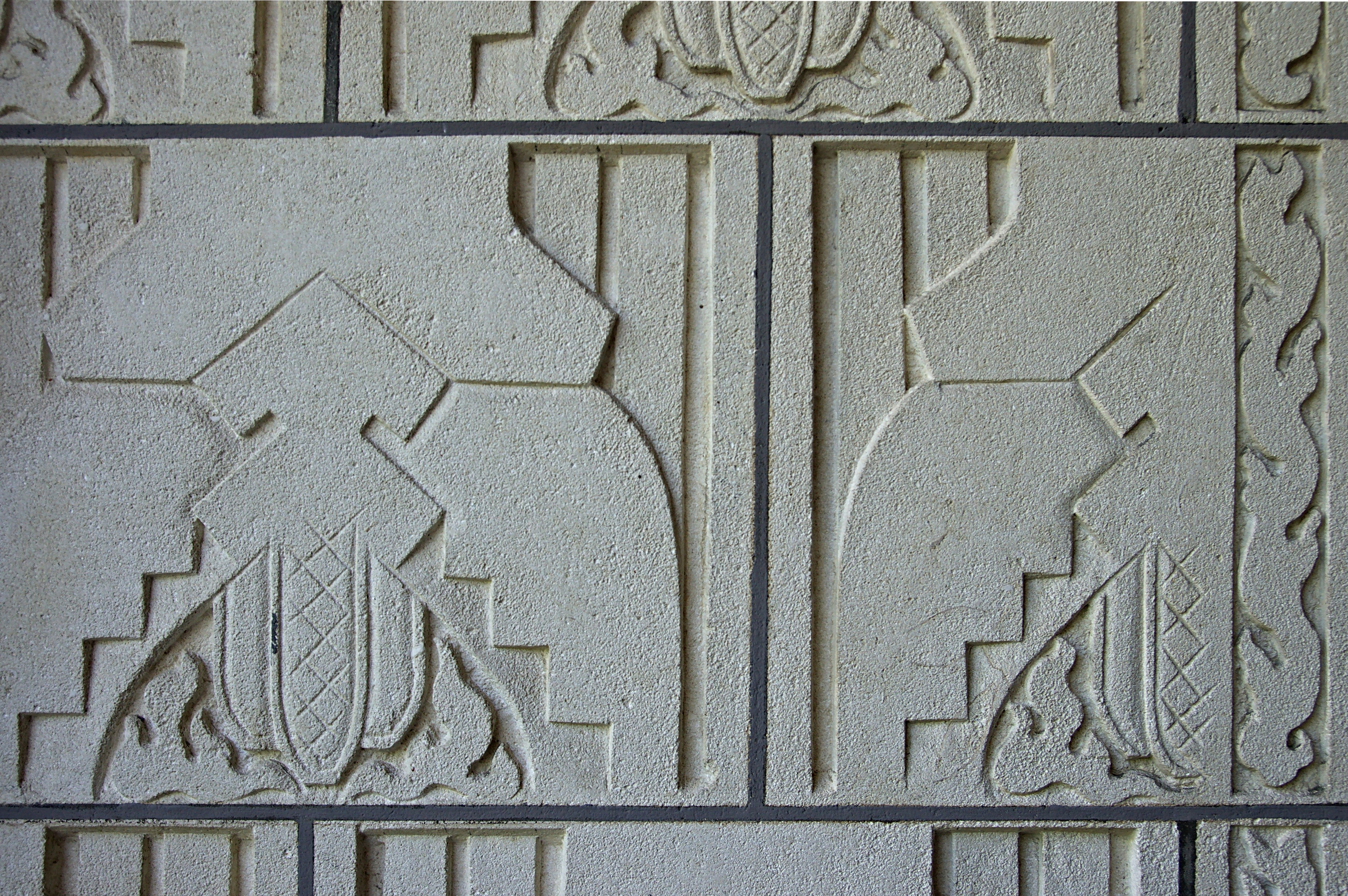
Crematorium, with pine cone detail

A variation called Style Sapin ('Fir-tree Style') emerged in La Chaux-de-Fonds in the Canton of Neuchâtel in Switzerland. The style was launched by the painter and artist Charles l'Eplattenier and was inspired especially by the sapin, 'fir tree', and other plants and wildlife of the Jura Mountains. One of his major works was the crematorium in the town, which featured triangular tree forms, pine cones, and other natural themes from the region. The style also blended in the more geometric stylistic elements of Jugendstil and Vienna Secession.

Another notable building in the style is the Villa Fallet La Chaux-de-Fonds, a chalet designed and built in 1905 by a student of L'Eplattenier, the eighteen-year-old Le Corbusier. The form of the house was a traditional Swiss chalet, but the decoration of the façade included triangular trees and other natural features. Le Corbusier built two more chalets in the area, including the Villa Stotzer, in a more traditional chalet style.

=== Tiffany Style and Louis Sullivan in the United States ===
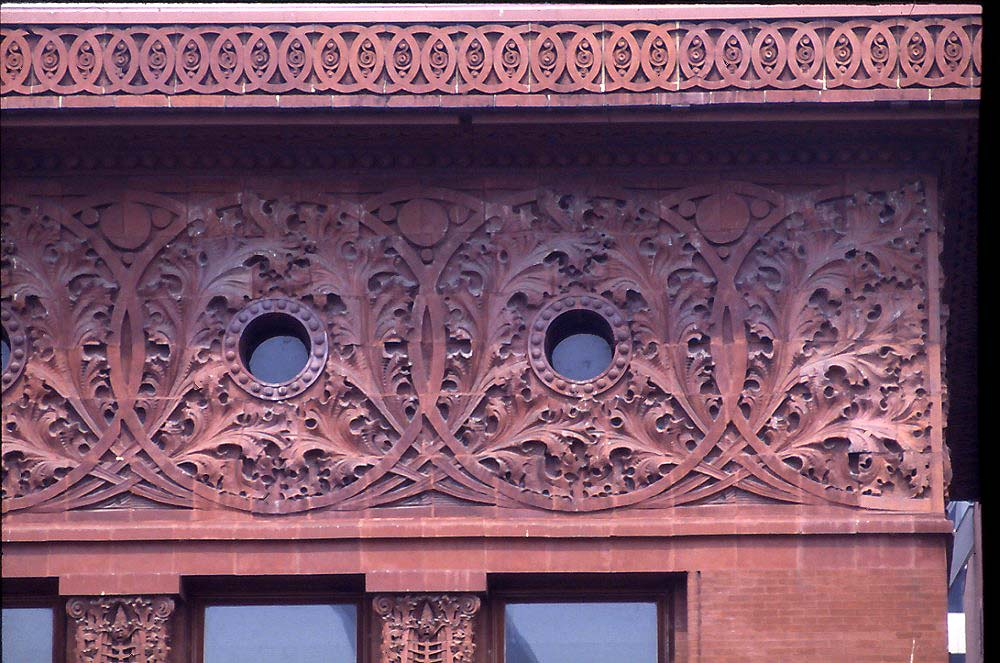
Windows of the Wainwright Building in St. Louis, Missouri, by Louis Sullivan (1891)

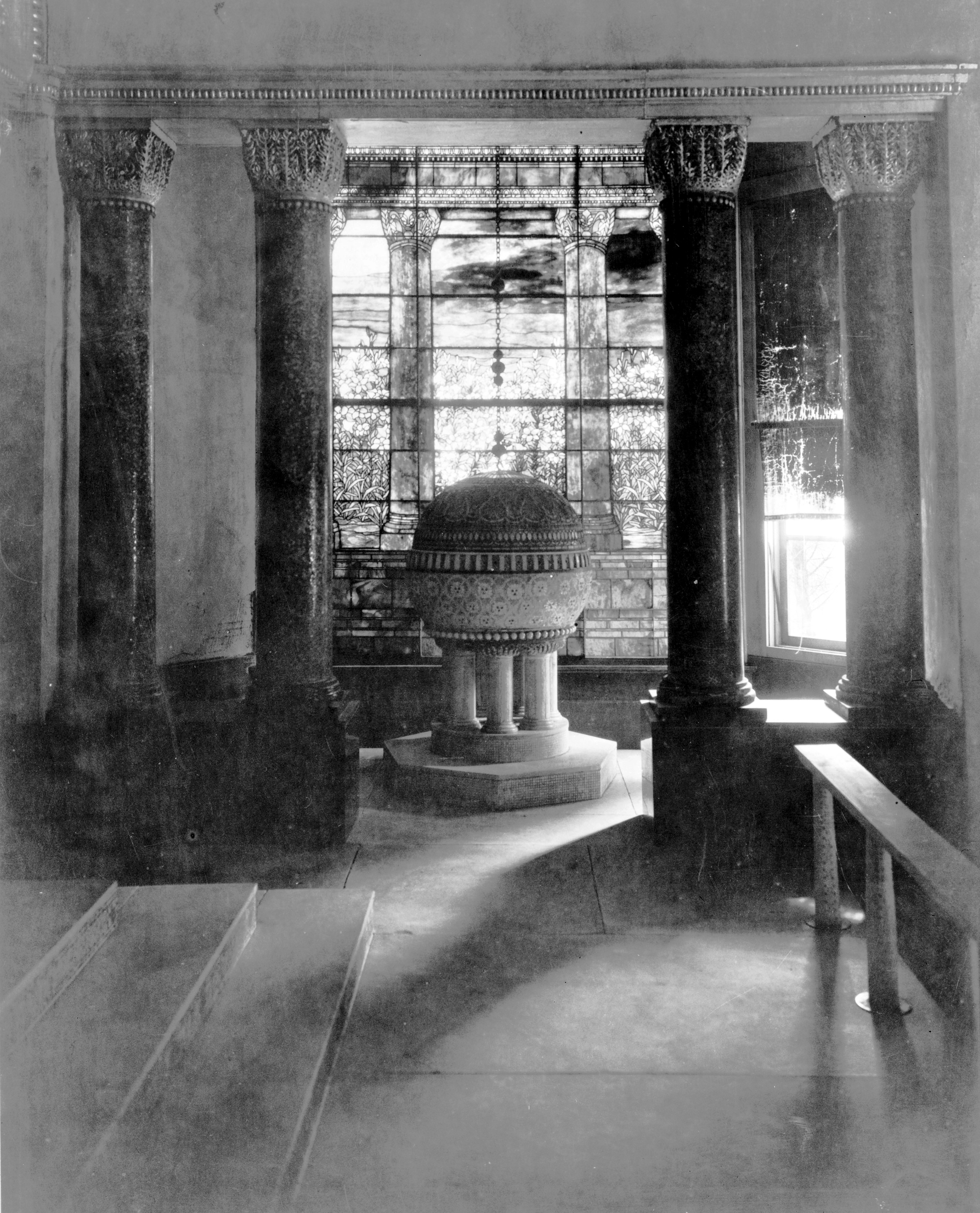
Tiffany Chapel from the 1893 Word's Columbian Exposition, now in the Charles Hosmer Morse Museum of American Art in Winter Park, Florida

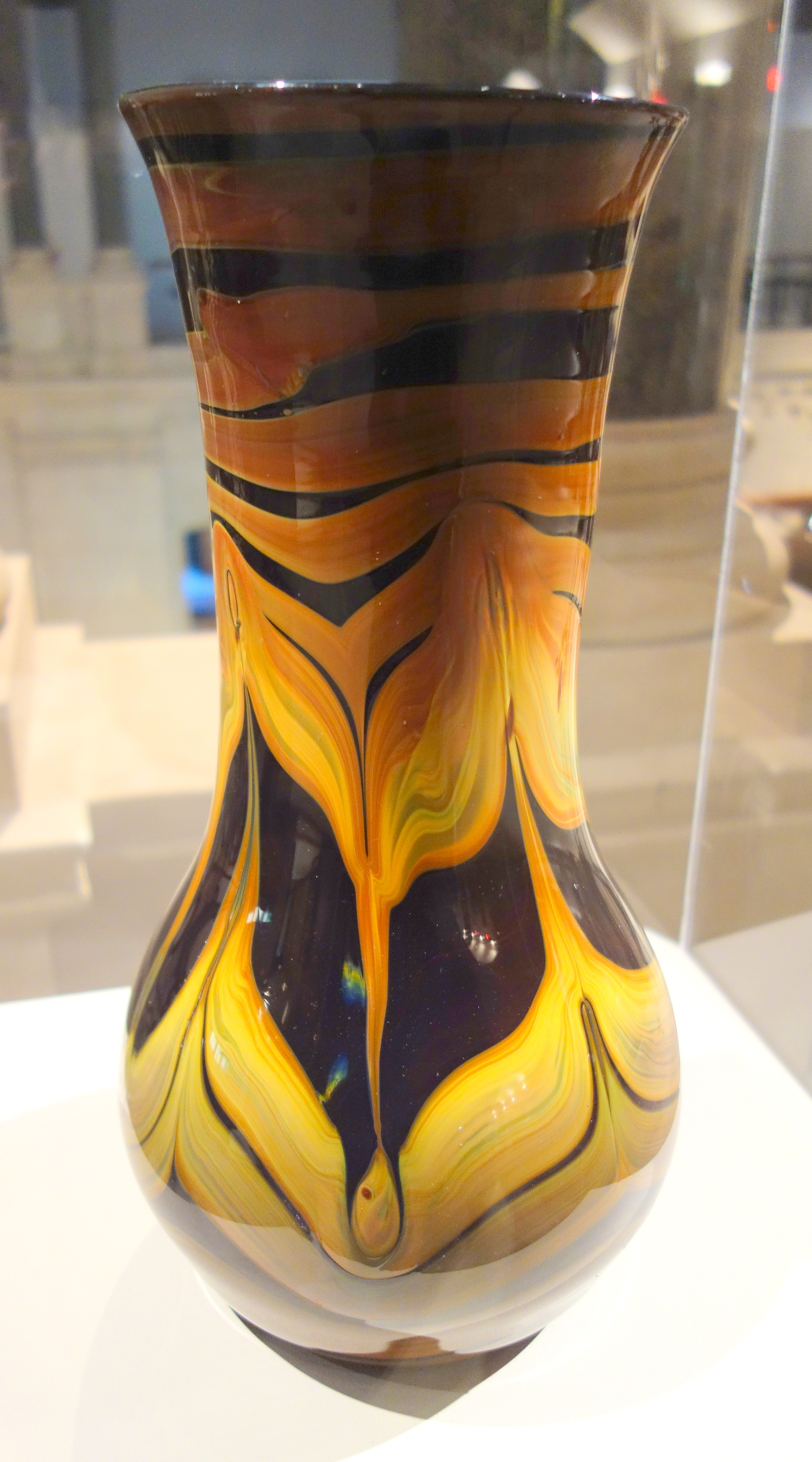
Glass vase by Louis Comfort Tiffany (1893–1896), now in the Cincinnati Art Museum

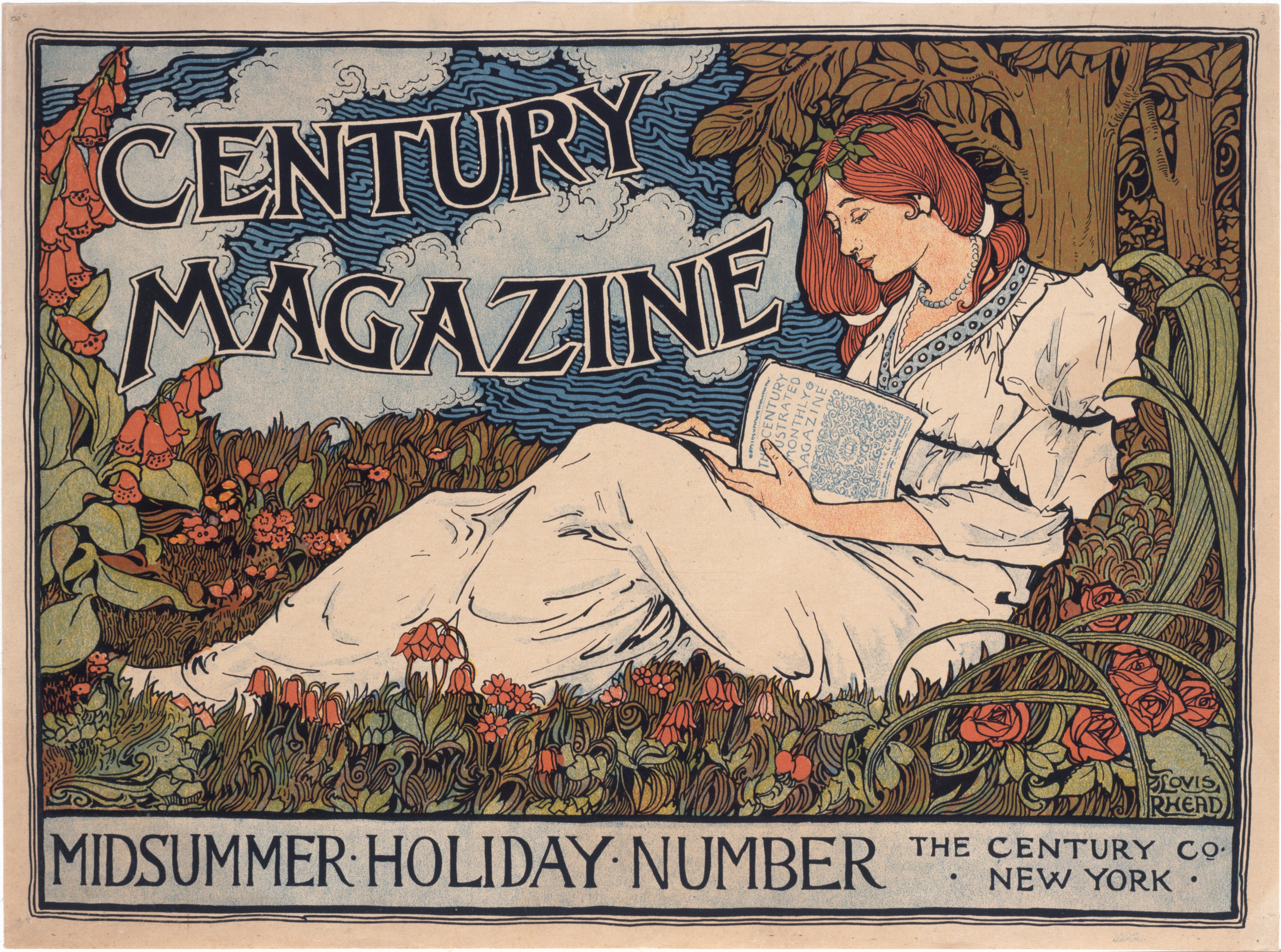
Century Magazine, poster by Louis John Rhead (1894)

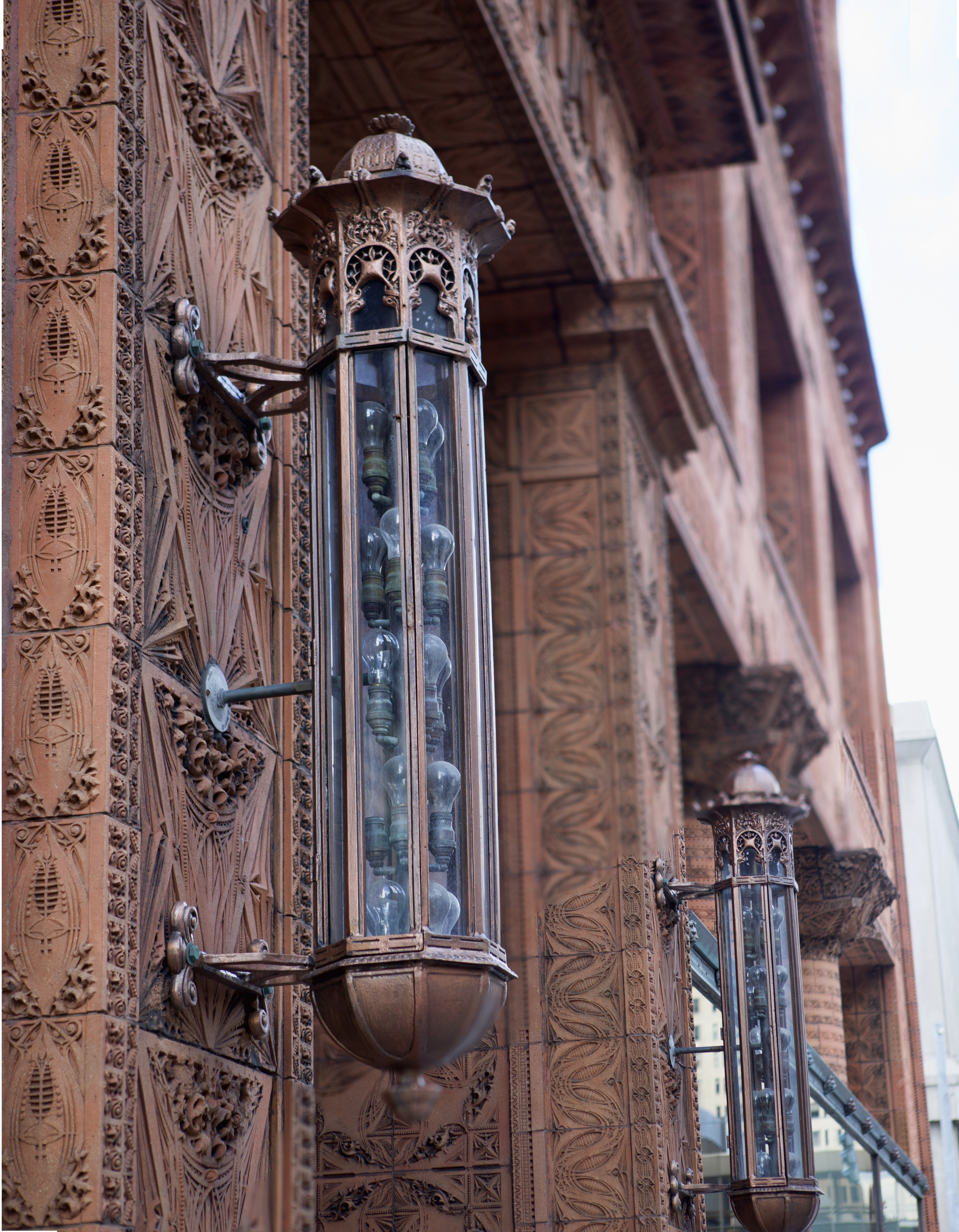
Detail of the Guaranty Building (Buffalo, New York) in Buffalo, N.Y., by Sullivan (1896)

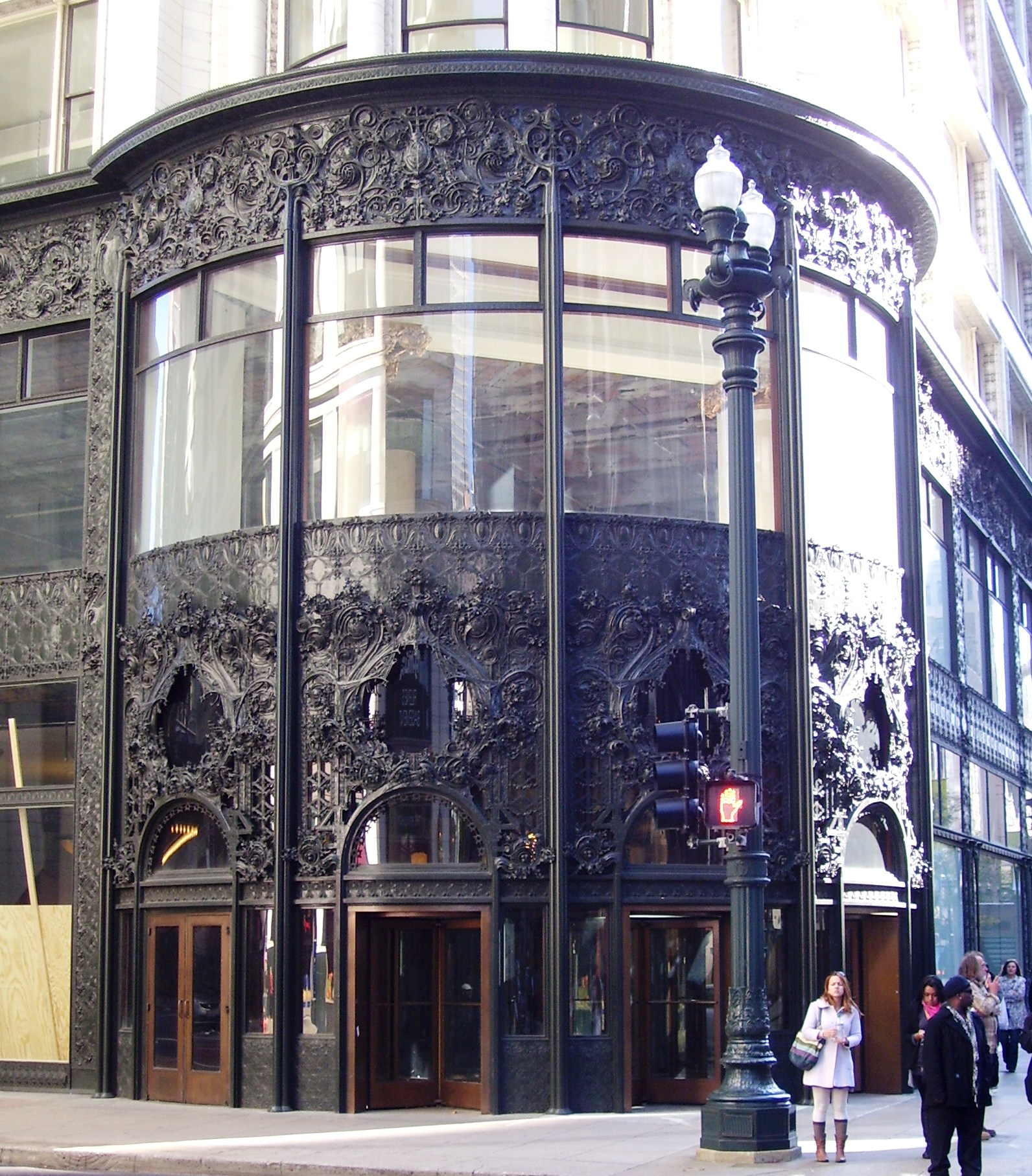
South State Street entrance to the Carson, Pirie, Scott and Company Store in Chicago, Illinois, by Sullivan (1899)

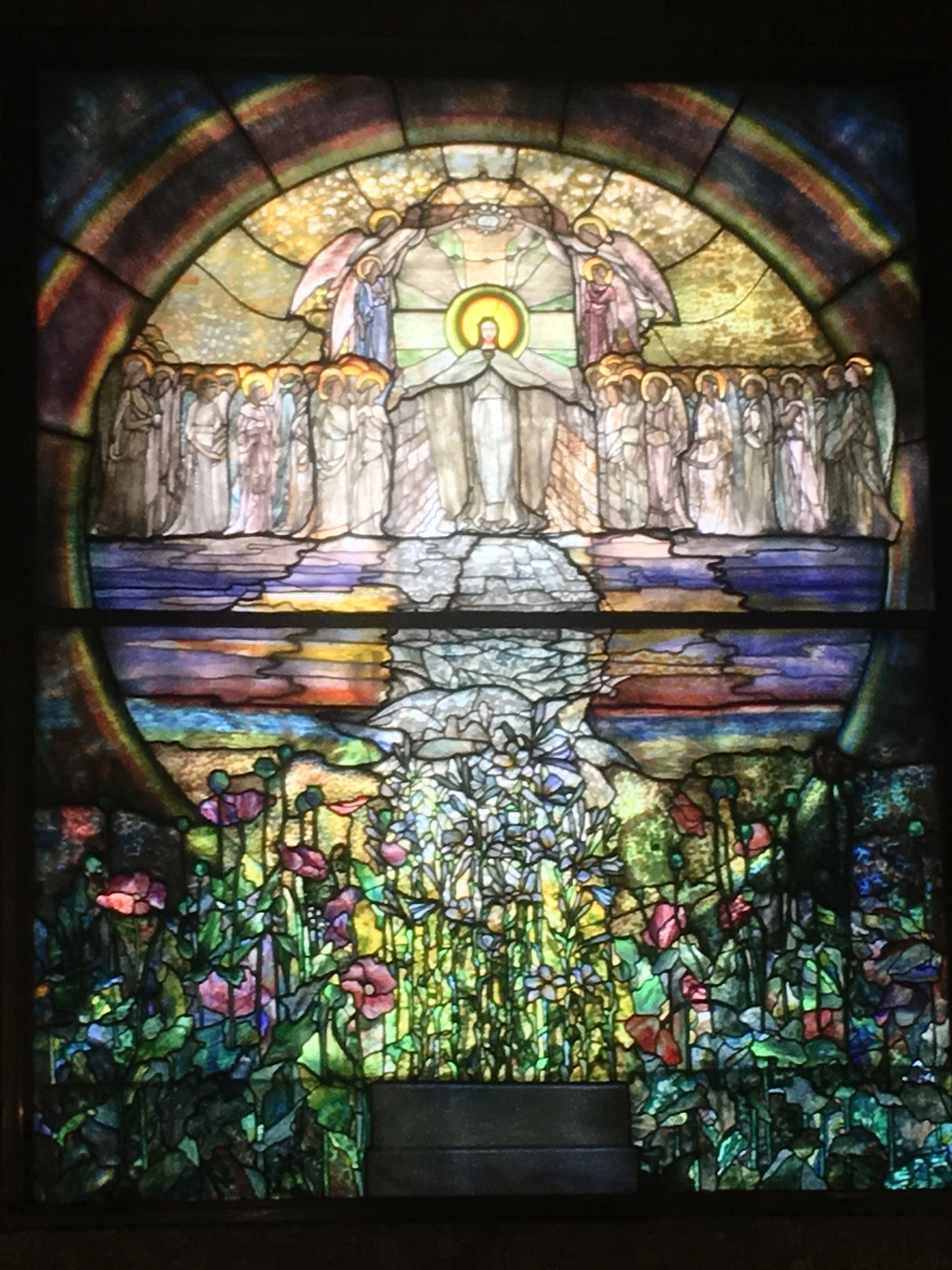
The Flight of Souls window by Tiffany won a gold medal at the 1900 Paris Exposition

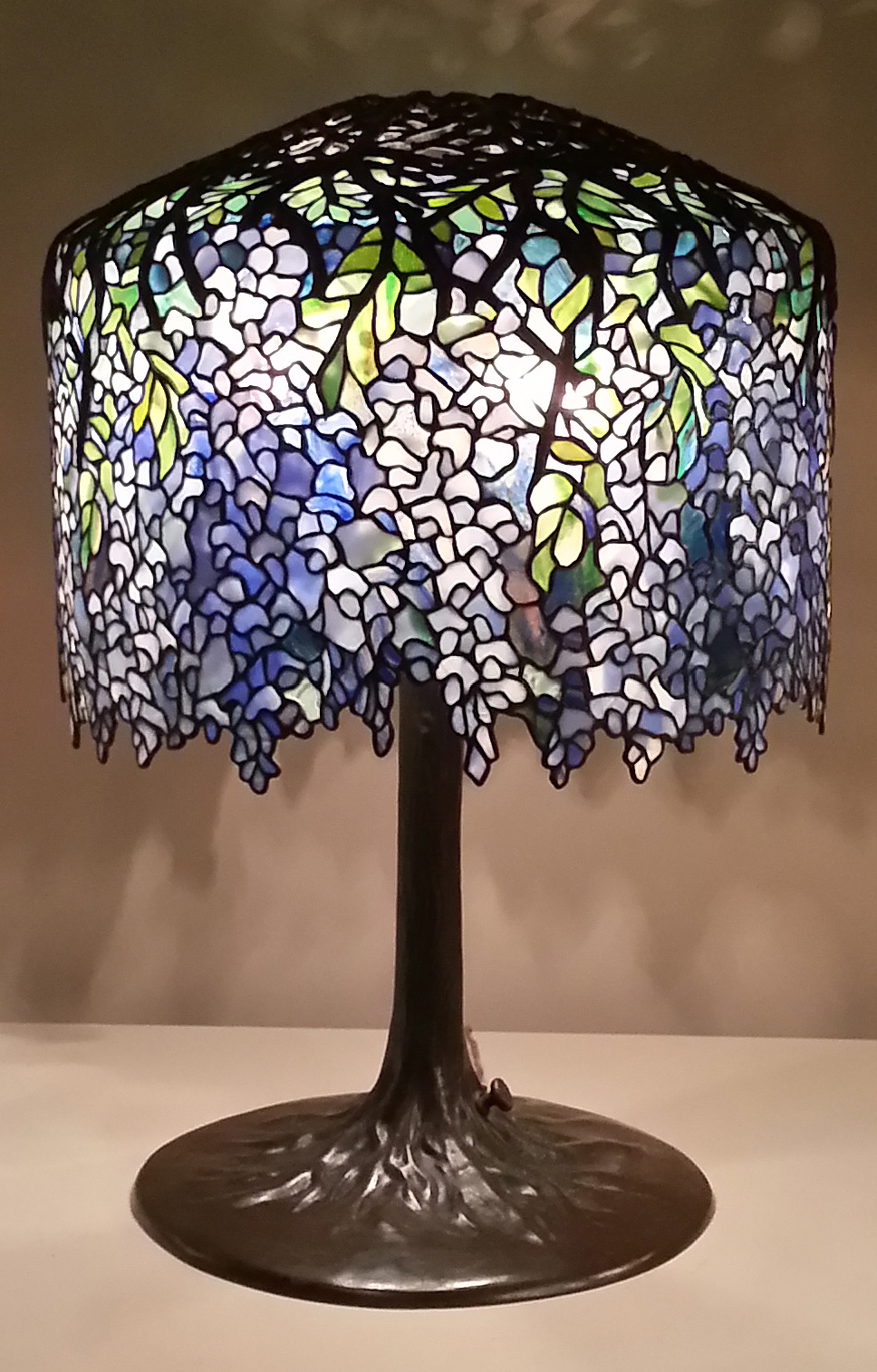
Wisteria lamp by Tiffany (c. 1902), in the Virginia Museum of Fine Arts

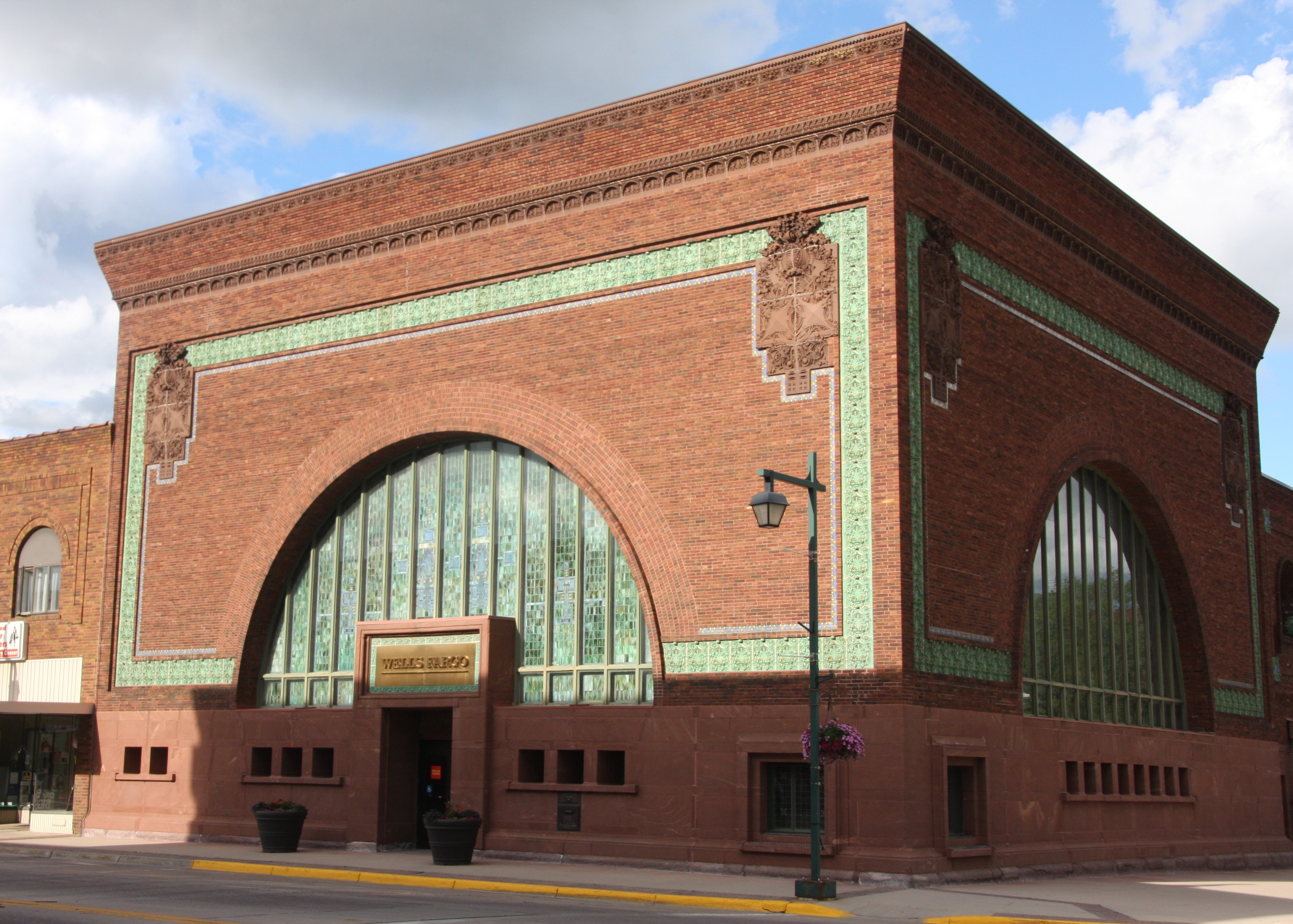
National Farmer's Bank of Owatonna by Sullivan (1907–08)

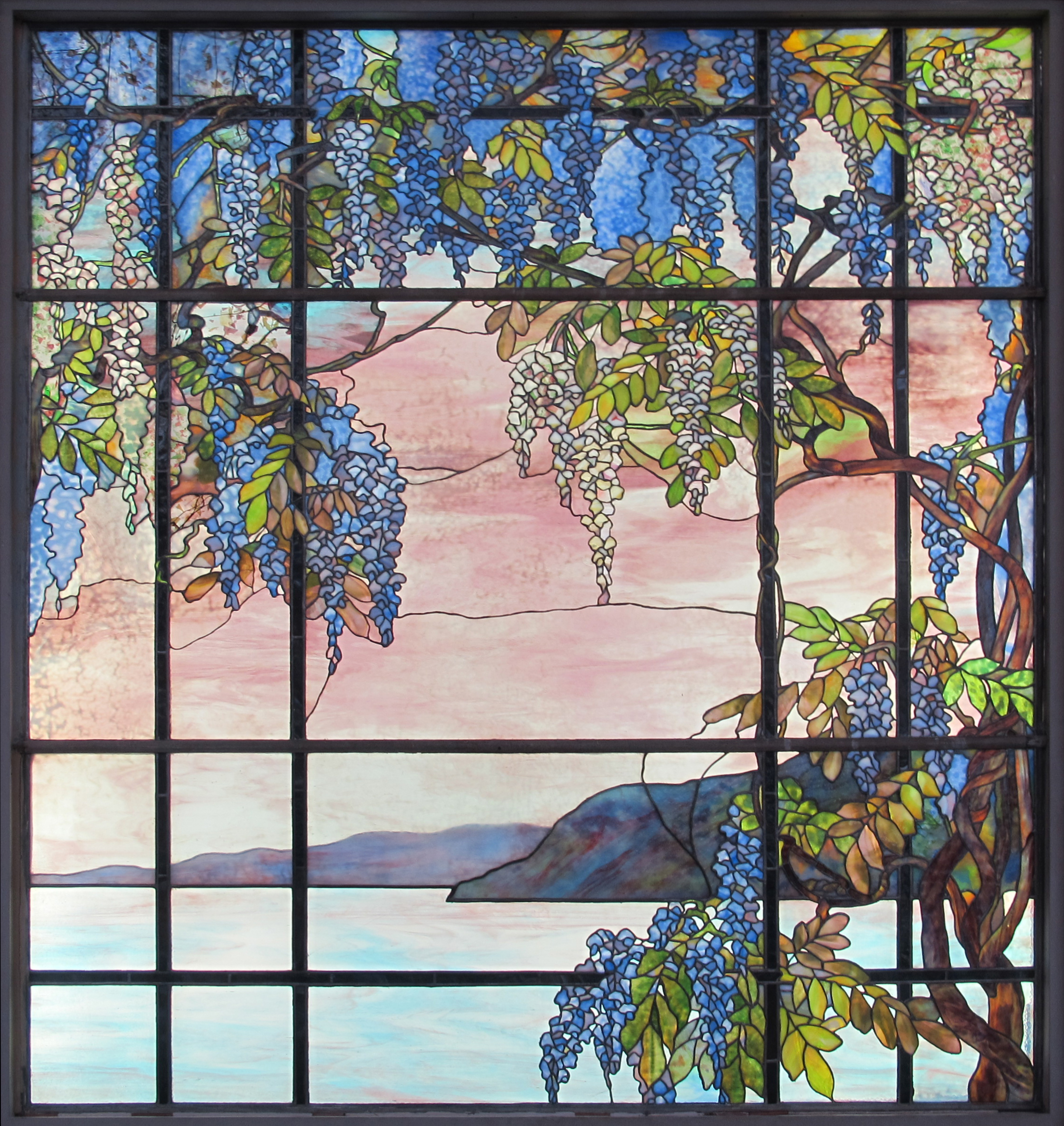
Tiffany window in his house at Oyster Bay, N.Y. (1908)

In the United States, the firm of Louis Comfort Tiffany played a central role in American Art Nouveau. Born in 1848, he studied at the National Academy of Design in New York City, began working with glass at the age of 24, entered the family business started by his father, and in 1885 set up his own enterprise devoted to fine glass, and developed new techniques for its colouring. In 1893, he began making glass vases and bowls, again developing new techniques that allowed more original shapes and colouring, and began experimenting with decorative window glass. Layers of glass were printed, marbled and superimposed, giving an exceptional richness and variety of colour in 1895 his new works were featured in the Art Nouveau gallery of Siegfried Bing, giving him a new European clientele. After the death of his father in 1902, he took over the entire Tiffany enterprise, but still devoted much of his time to designing and manufacturing glass art objects. At the urging of Thomas Edison, he began to manufacture electric lamps with multicoloured glass shades in structures of bronze and iron, or decorated with mosaics, produced in numerous series and editions, each made with the care of a piece of jewellery. A team of designers and craftsmen worked on each product. The Tiffany lamp in particular became one of the icons of the Art Nouveau, but Tiffany's craftsmen designed and made extraordinary windows, vases, and other glass art. Tiffany's glass also had great success at the 1900 Exposition Universelle in Paris; his stained glass window called the Flight of Souls won a gold medal. The Columbian Exposition was an important venue for Tiffany; a chapel he designed was shown at the Pavilion of Art and Industry. The Tiffany Chapel, along with one of the windows of Tiffany's home in New York, are now on display at the Charles Hosmer Morse Museum of American Art in Winter Park, Florida.

Another important figure in American Art Nouveau was the architect Louis Sullivan. Sullivan was a leading pioneer of American modern architecture. He was the founder of the Chicago School, the architect of some of the first skyscrapers, and the teacher of Frank Lloyd Wright. His most famous saying was "Form follows function." While the form of his buildings was shaped by their function, his decoration was an example of American Art Nouveau. At the 1893 World's Columbian Exposition in Chicago, most famous for the neoclassical architecture of its renowned White City, he designed a spectacular Art Nouveau entrance for the very functional Transportation Building.

While the architecture of his Carson, Pirie, Scott and Company Building (1899) (now the Sullivan Center) was strikingly modern and functional, he surrounded the windows with stylised floral decoration. He invented equally original decoration for the National Farmer's Bank of Owatonna, Minnesota (1907–1908) and the Merchants' National Bank in Grinell, Iowa. He invented a specifically American variety of Art Nouveau, declaring that decorative forms should oscillate, surge, mix and derive without end. He created works of great precision which sometimes combined Gothic with Art Nouveau themes.

Also worth noting are the Uhl brothers from Toledo, Ohio, who set new standards in metal furniture production with their designs for the Toledo Metal Furniture Co.

=== Art Nouveau in Argentina ===
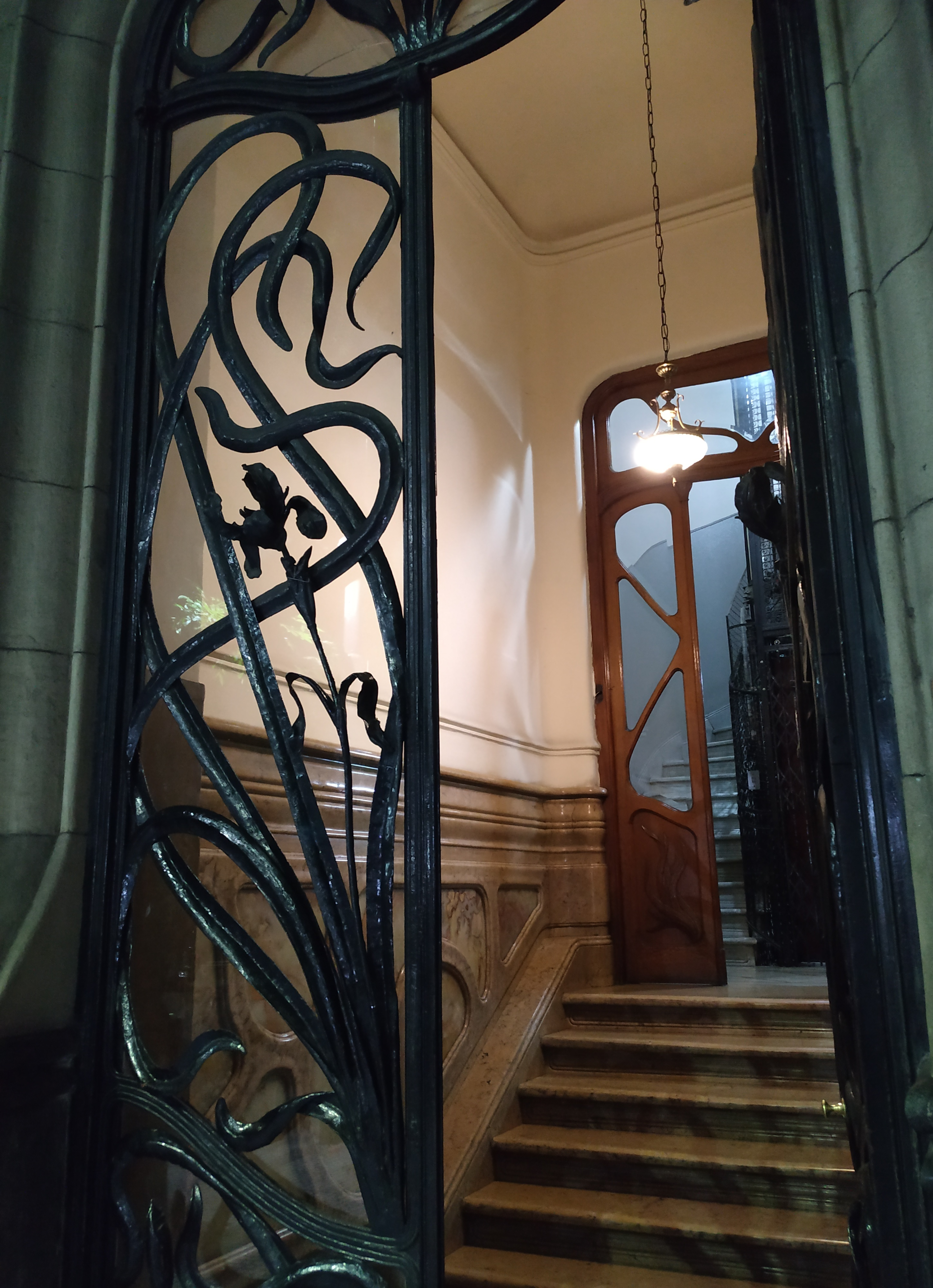
Entrance of Casa de los lirios in Buenos Aires by Eduardo Rodríguez Ortega (1905)

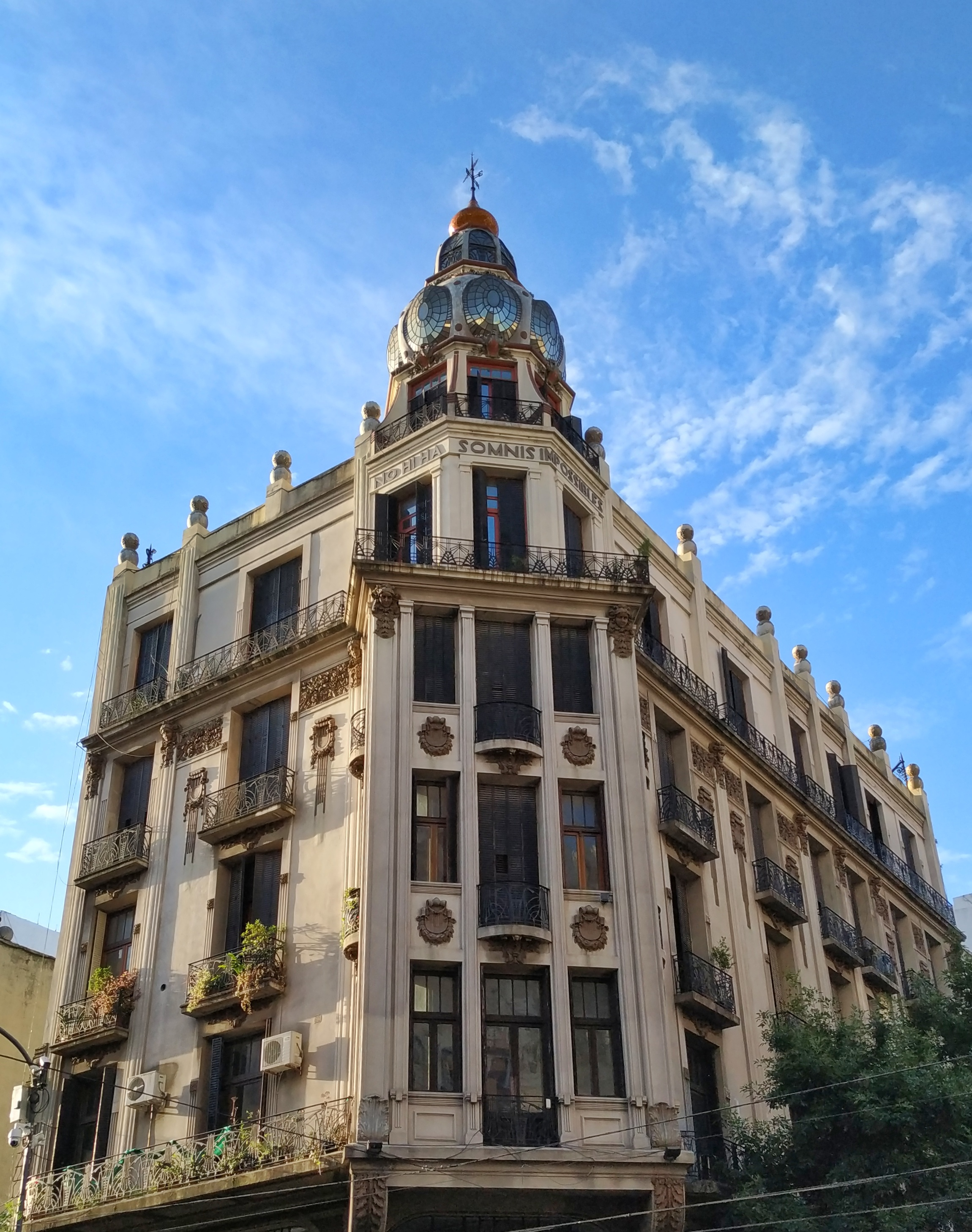
No Hi Ha Somnis Impossibles building in Buenos Aires by Eduardo Rodriguez Ortega (1907)

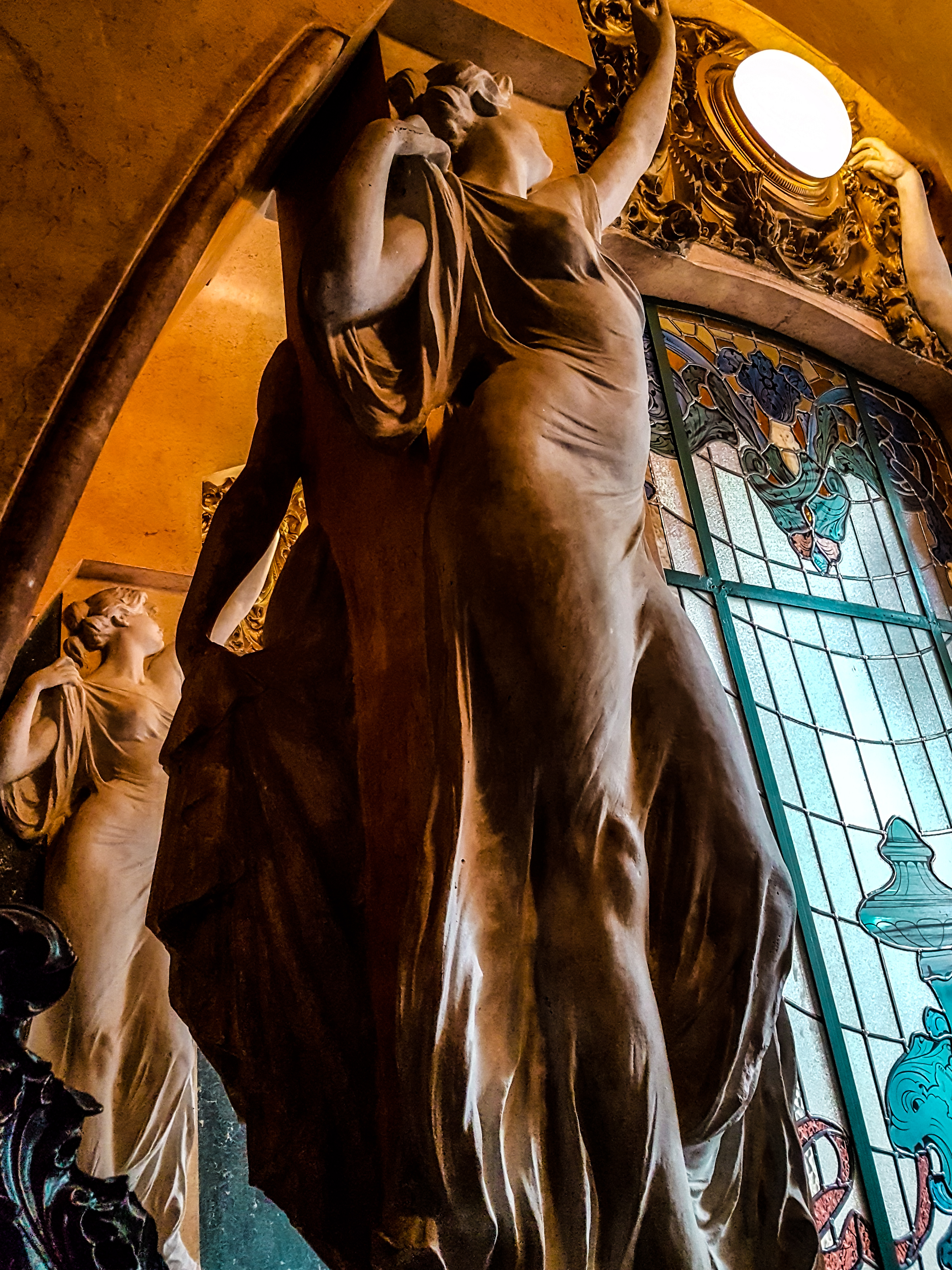
Stained glass and sculptures by Ercole Pasina in Calise House in Buenos Aires (1911)

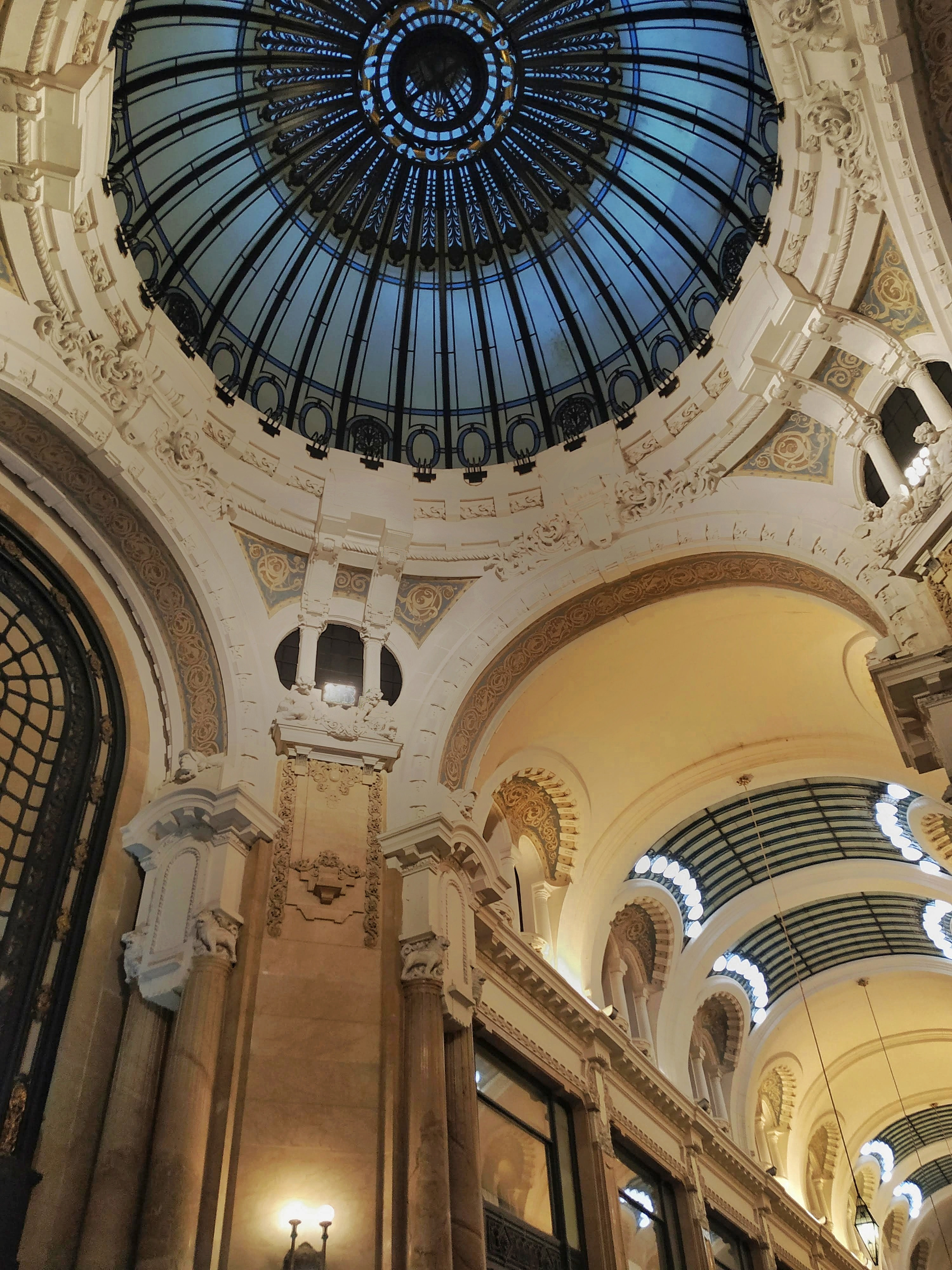
Galería Güemes in Buenos Aires by Francesco Gianotti (1914)

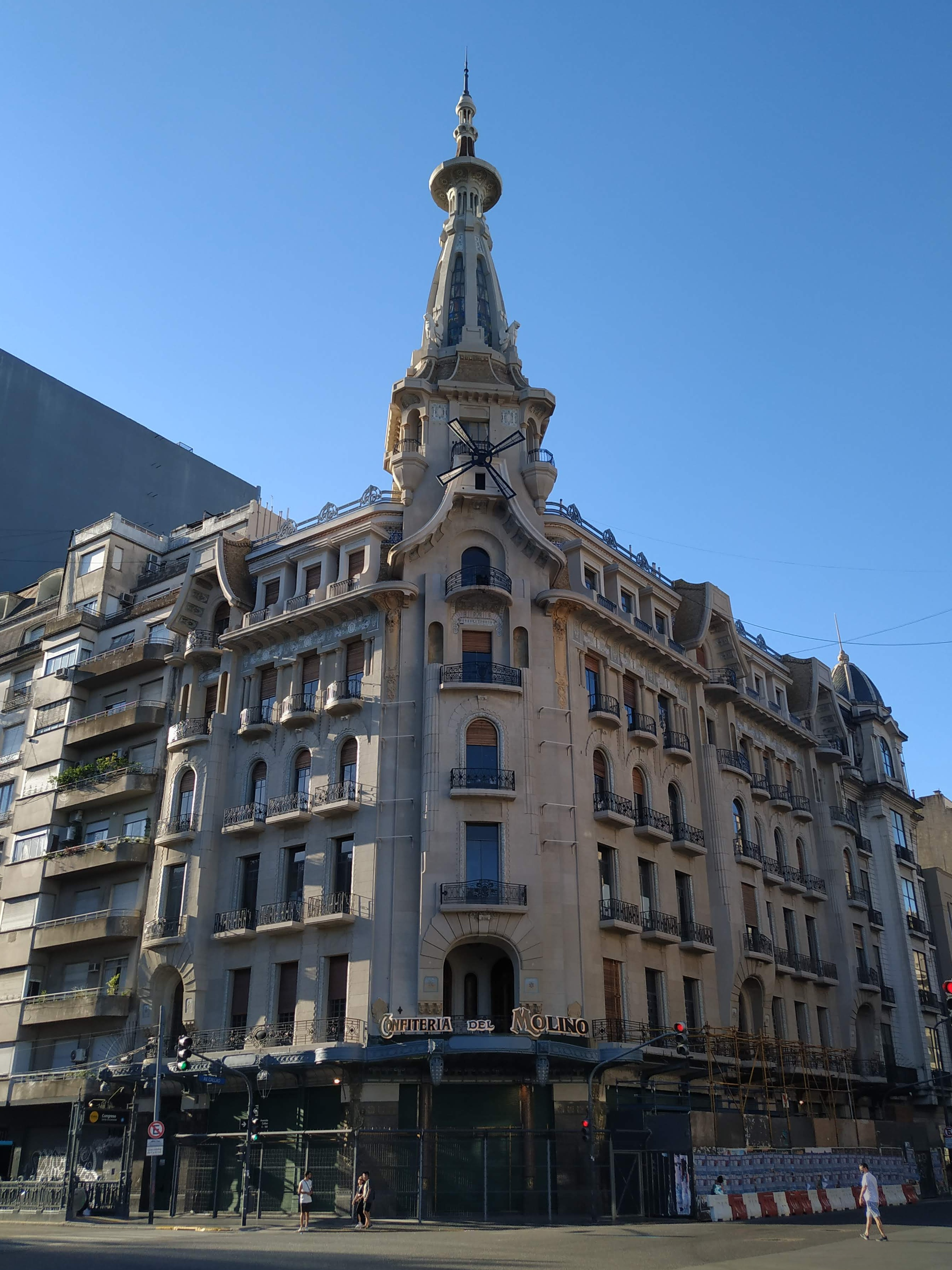
Confitería del Molino in Buenos Aires by Francesco Gianotti (1916)

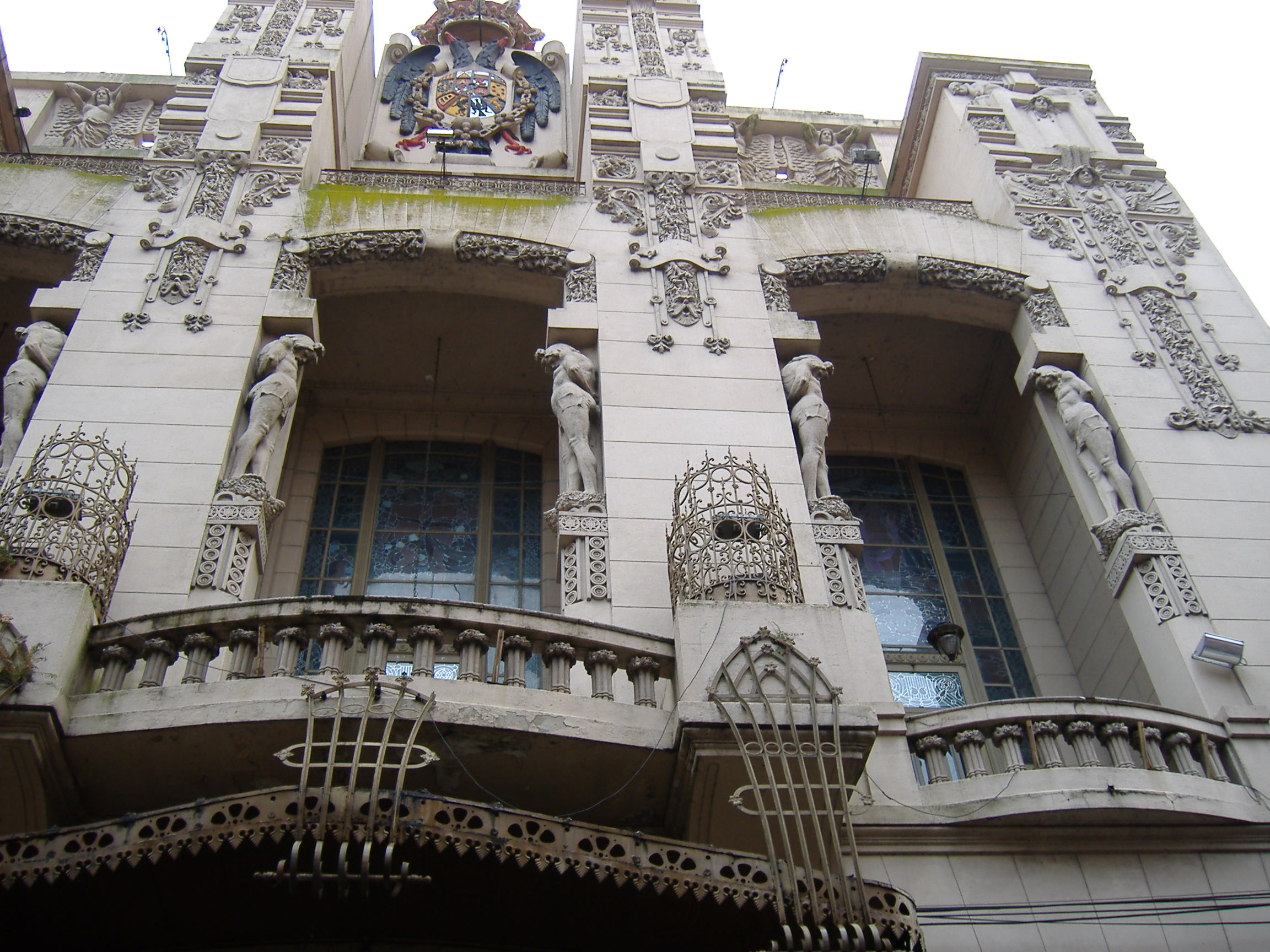
Metal work, ceramics and statues at the façade of Club Español building in Rosario (1912)

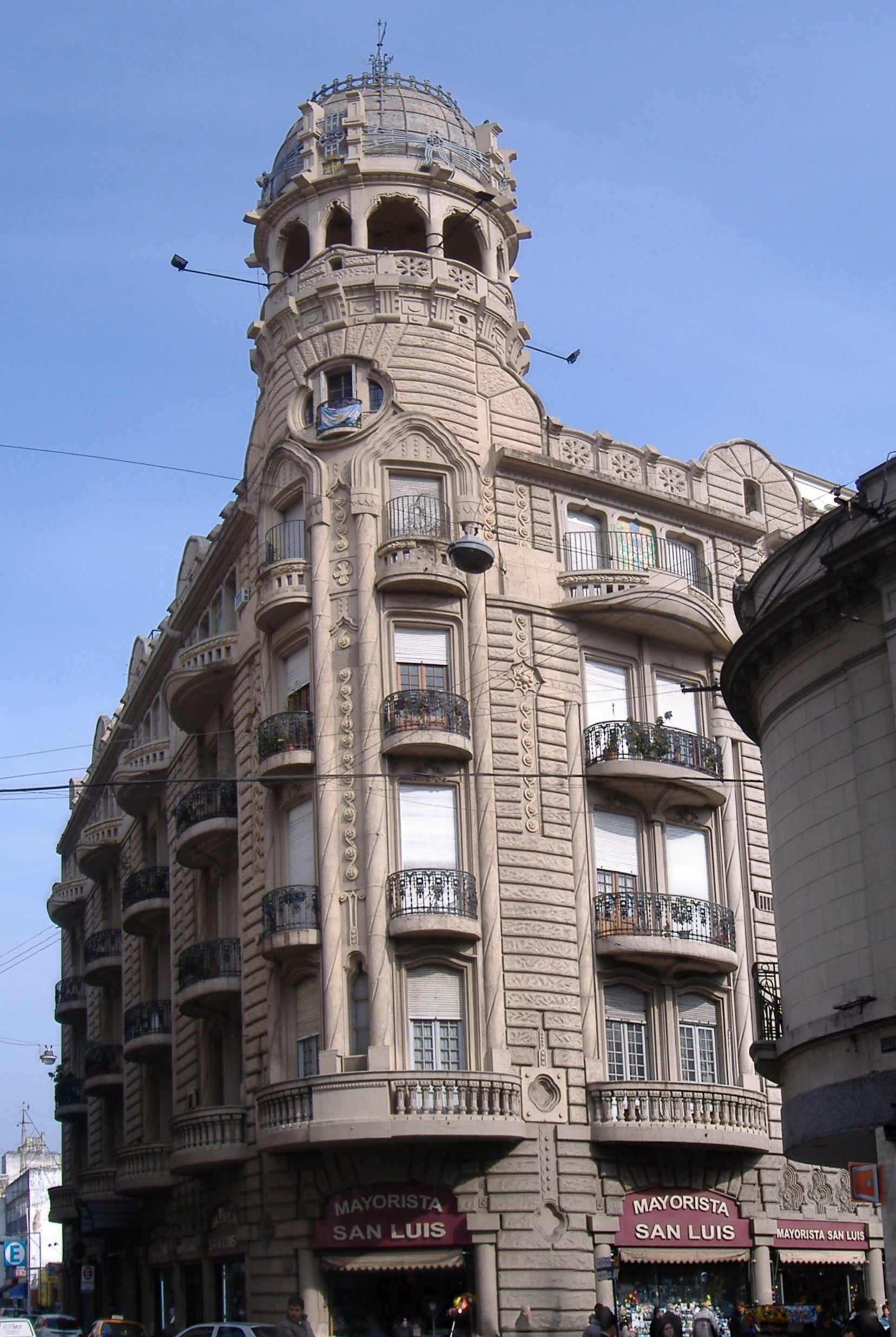
Palacio Cabanellas in Rosario by Francesc Roca i Simó (1916)

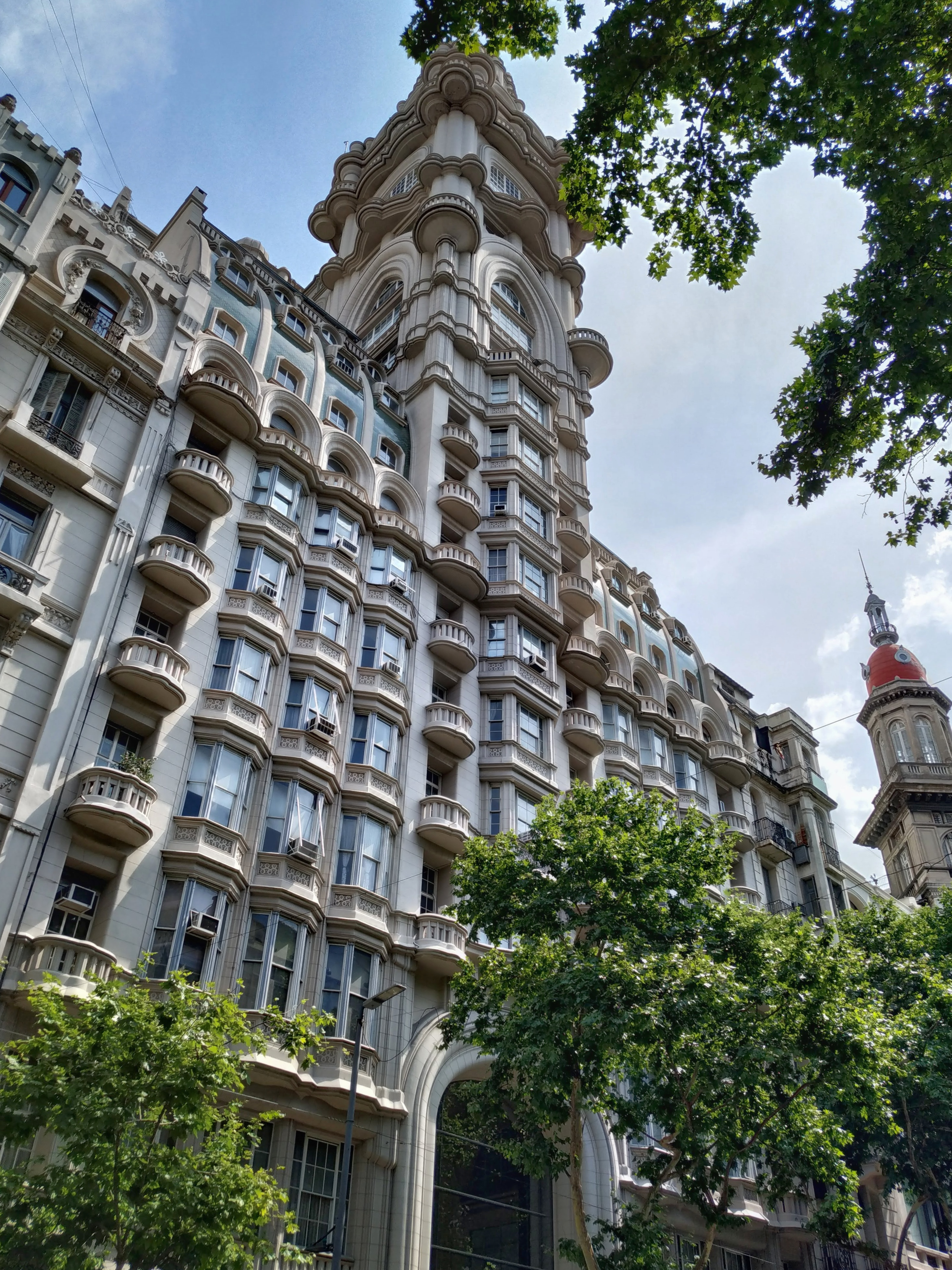
Palacio Barolo in Buenos Aires by Mario Palanti (1923)

Flooded with European immigrants, Argentina welcomed all artistic and architectural European styles, including Art Nouveau. There was an environment of huge investments and flexible rules for construction, which encouraged young architects from Europe to come and grow their portfolio to later go back to Europe. As a result of this, Argentina became the country outside of Europe with most art nouveau buildings. Cities with the most notable Art Nouveau heritage in Argentina are Buenos Aires, Rosario and Mar del Plata.

Paris was a prototype for Buenos Aires with the construction of large boulevards and avenues in the 19th century. The local style along with French influence was also following Italian Liberty as many architects (Virginio Colombo, Francisco Gianotti, Mario Palanti) were Italians. In works of Julián García Núñez Catalan influence can be noted as he completed his studies in Barcelona in 1900 as well as in the work of Eduardo Rodríguez Ortega. The influence of Vienna Secession can be found at Paso y Viamonte building, Club Español, Regimiento de Granaderos a Caballo and the Savoy hotel.

Some local features are the adaptation to the previously existent "chorizo house" format of buildings, which implied a relatively narrow façade for an actually deep building inside of the block, with multiple patios or holes for air and light; as well as the characteristic "cut corners" on every block that was a requirement by law in Buenos Aires since the end of the 1800s; material availability was also different than in Europe, and buildings will often be covered of a "simil piedra París" which was an imitation of the Parisian stone made by mixing cement with sand and different minerals.

The introduction of Art Nouveau in Rosario is connected to Francisco Roca Simó who trained in Barcelona. His Club Español building (1912) features one of the largest stained glass windows in Latin America produced (as well as tiling and ceramics) by the local firm Buxadera, Fornells y Cía. The sculptor of the building is Diego Masana from Barcelona.

Belgian influence on Argentinian Art Nouveau is represented by the Villa Ortiz Basualdo, now hosting the Juan Carlos Castagnino Municipal Museum of Art in Mar del Plata where the furniture, interiors, and lighting are by Gustave Serrurier-Bovy.

=== Art Nouveau in the rest of the world ===
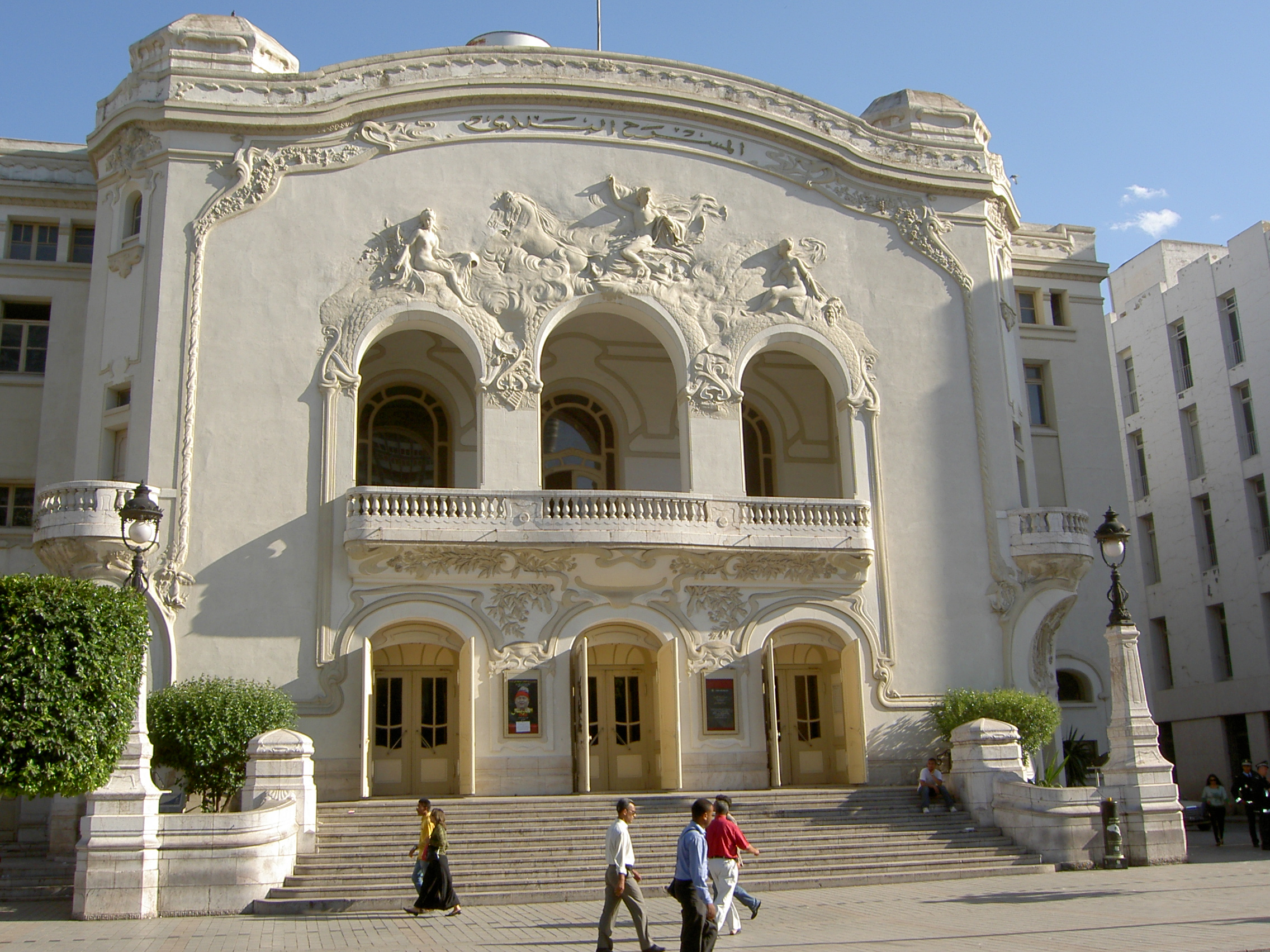
Théâtre municipal in Tunis, Tunisia (1902)

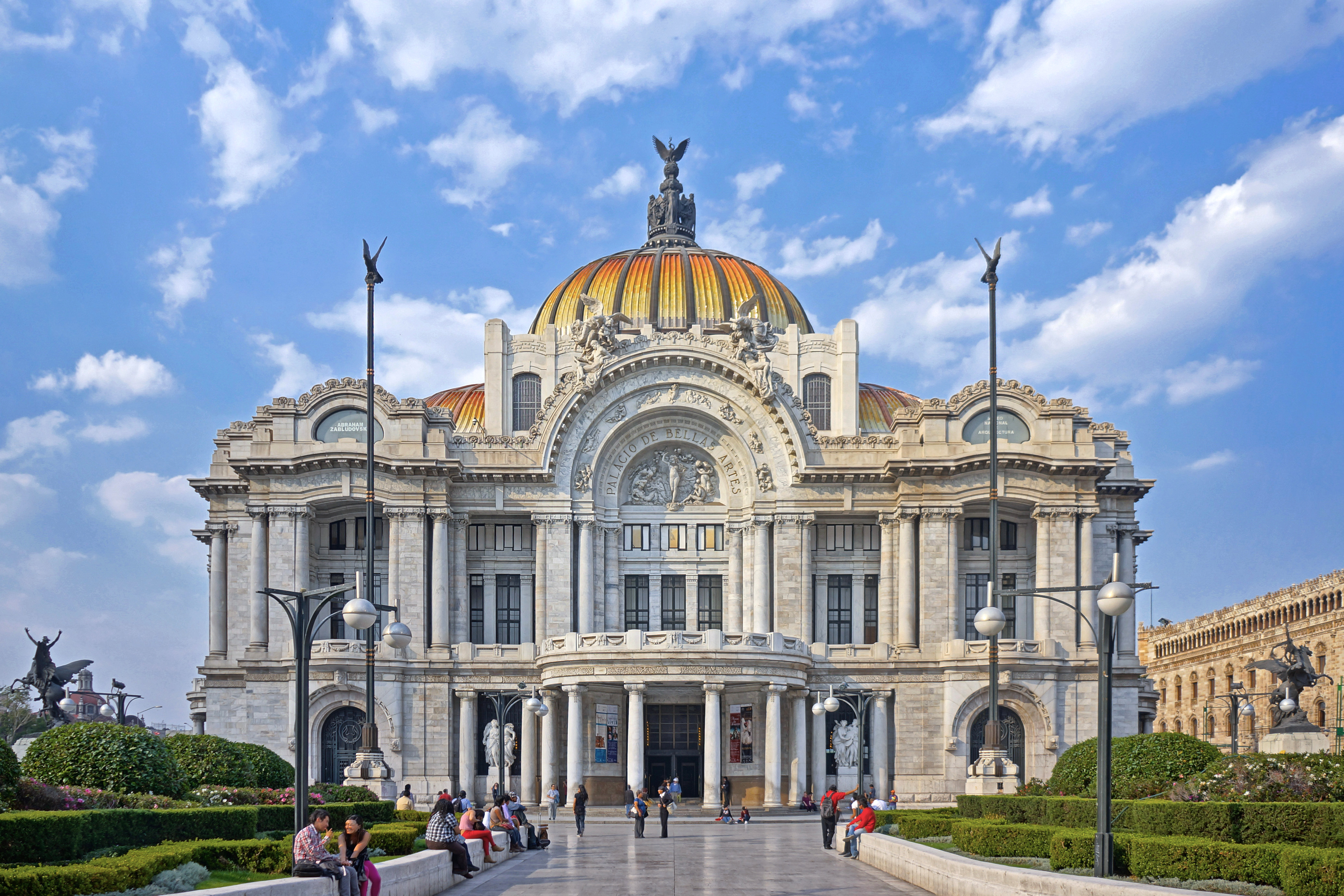
Art Nouveau/Neoclassical Palacio de Bellas Artes (Palace of Fine Arts) in Mexico City, Mexico (1904–1934)

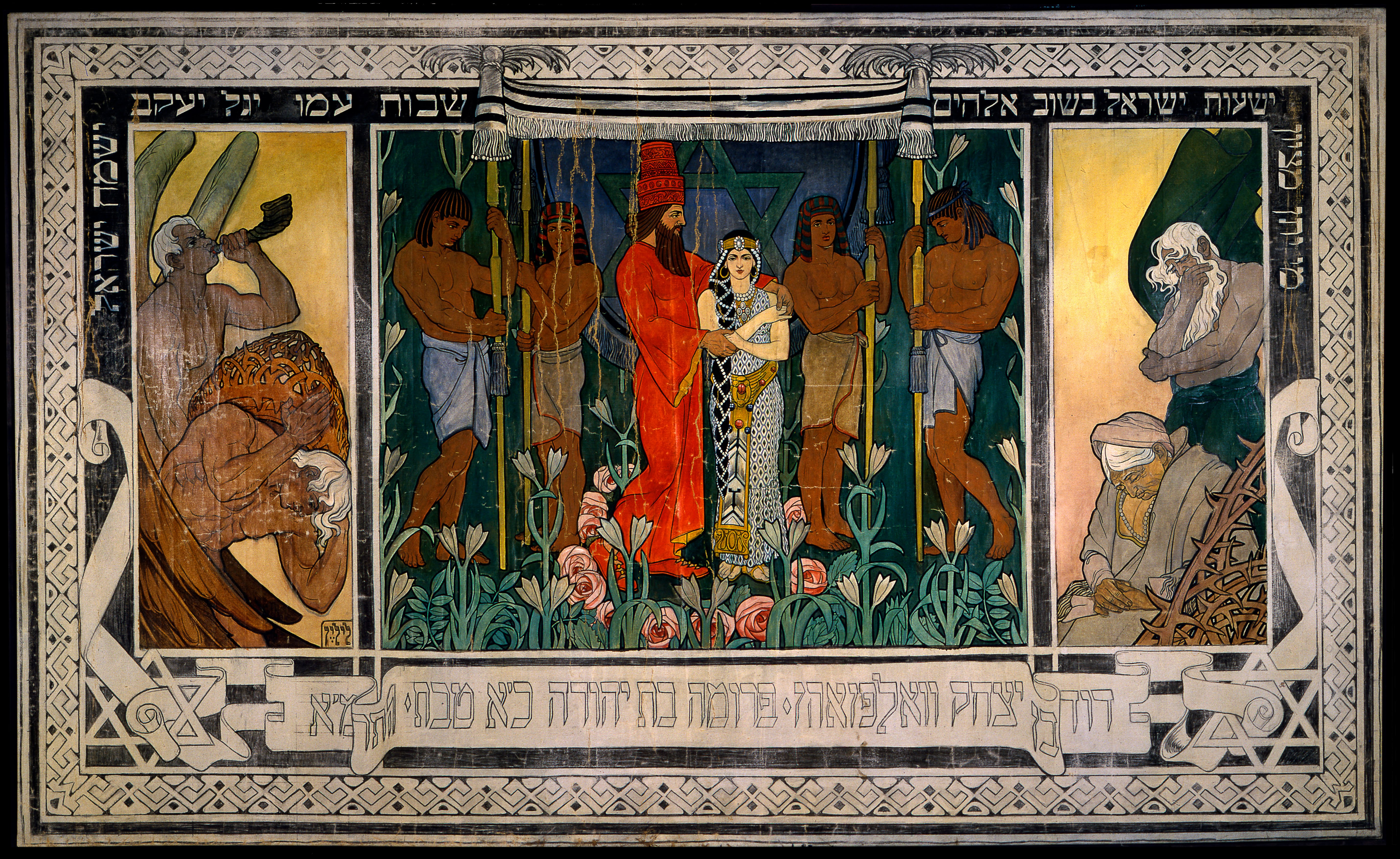
An Allegorical Wedding: Sketch for a carpet (Triptych from right to left): Exile, Marriage and Redemption by Ephraim Moses Lilien (1906)

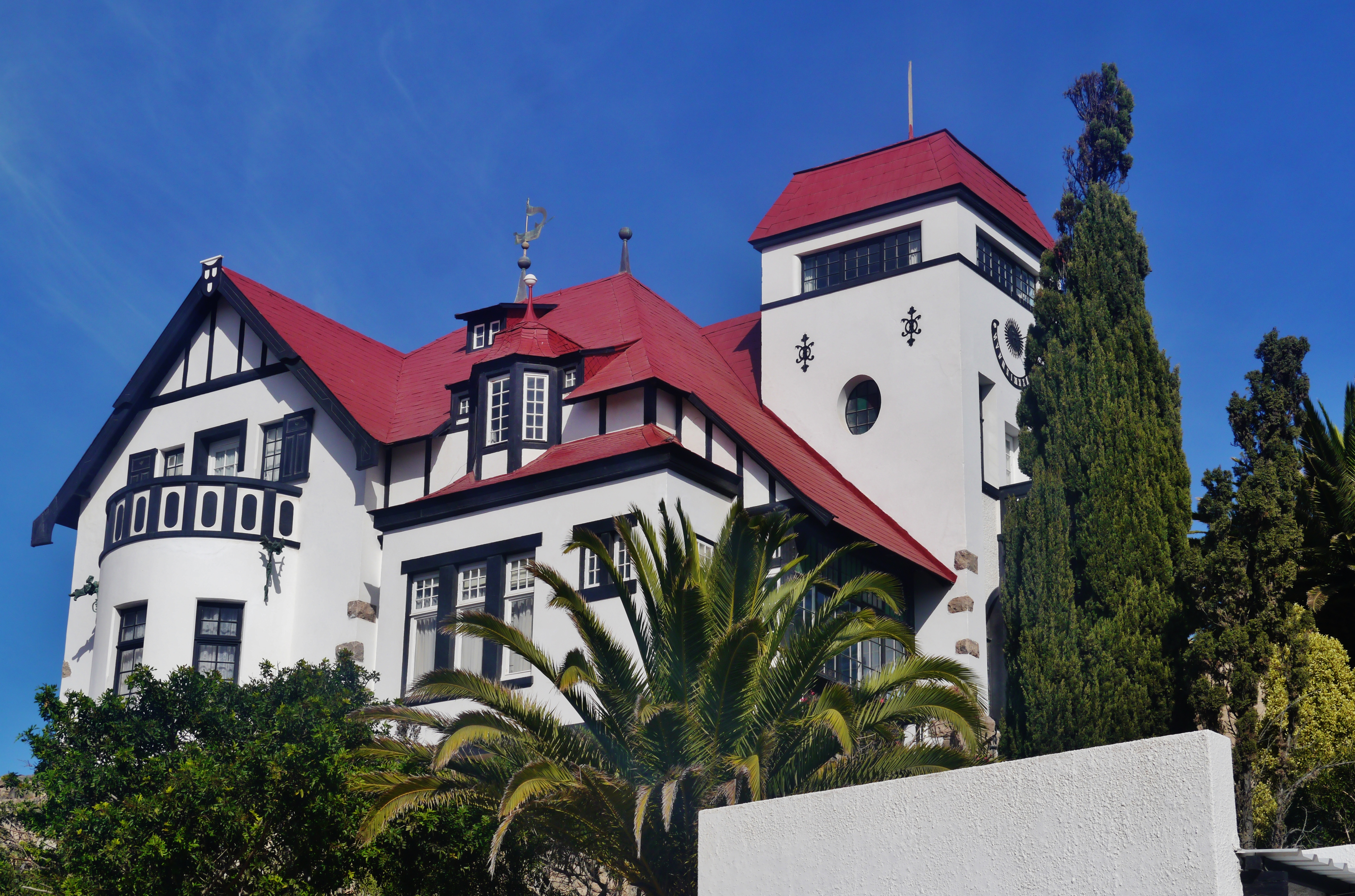
Goerke-Haus in Lüderitz, Namibia (1909–1910)

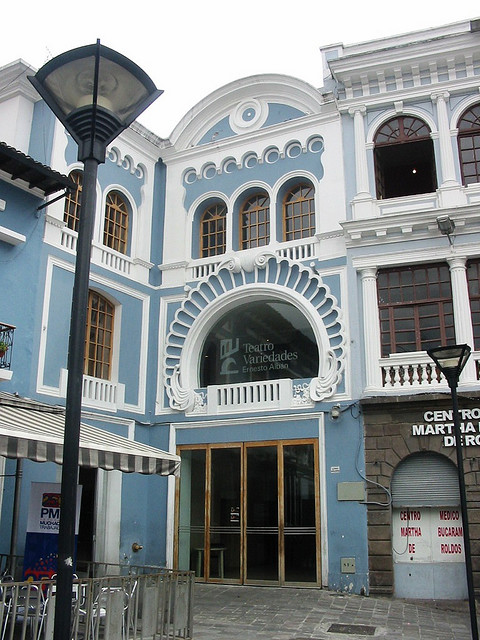
Teatro Variedades in Quito, Ecuador (1913-1914)

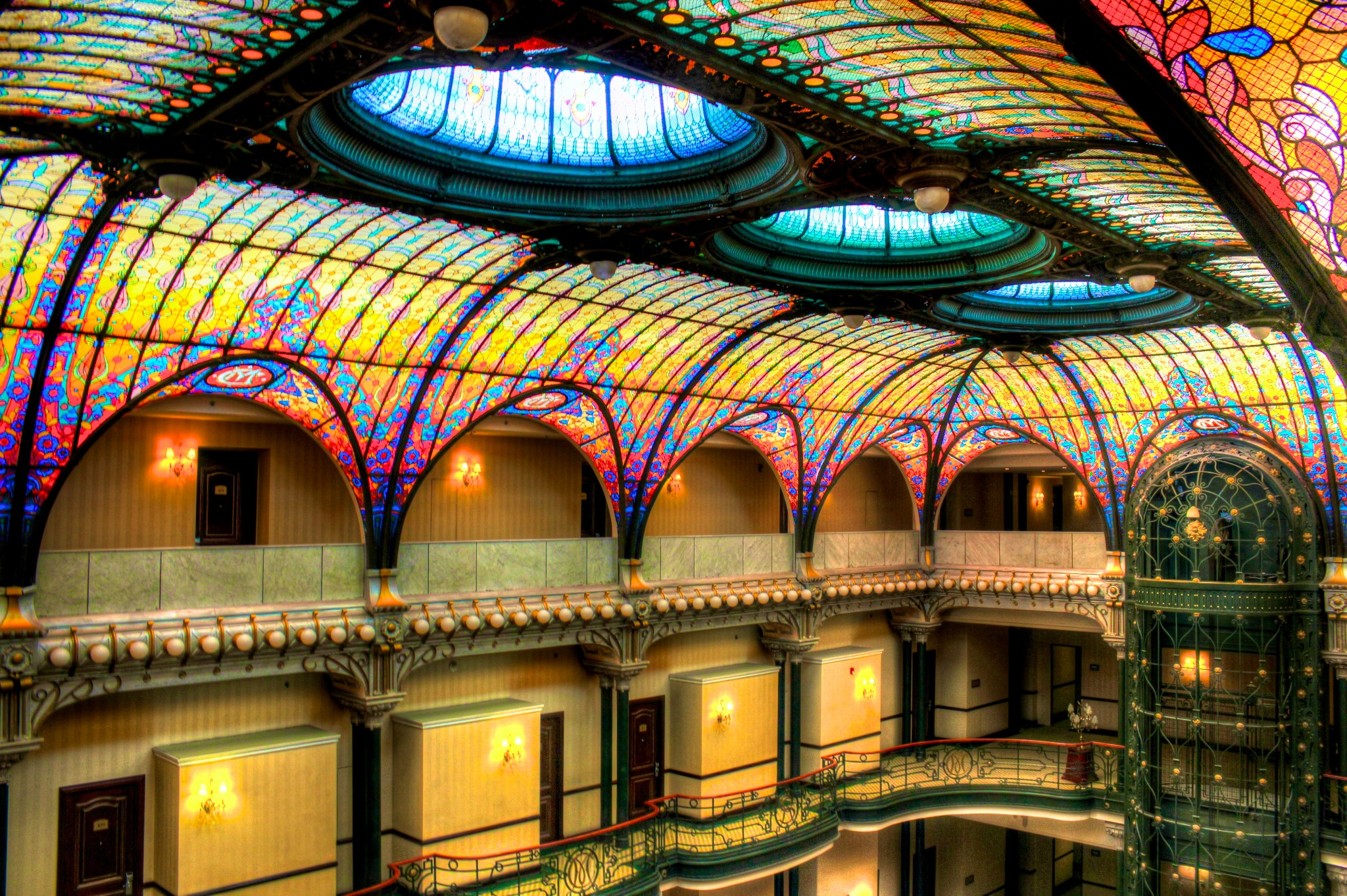
Mexico City Gran Hotel interior, built in 1918 by Jacques Grüber

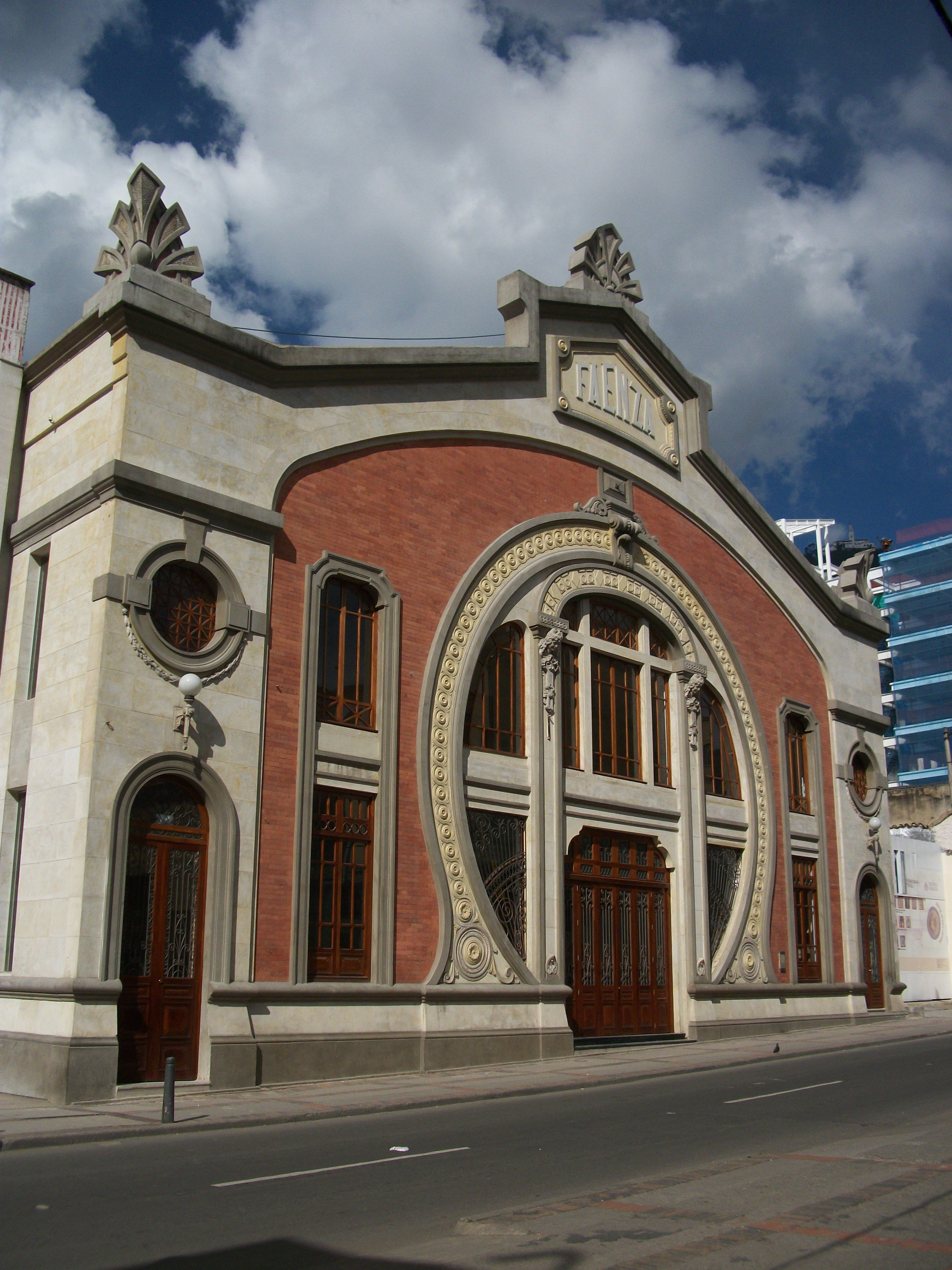
Faenza Theatre in Bogotá, Colombia (1924)

As in Argentina, Art Nouveau in other countries was mostly influenced by foreign artists:

- Spaniards were behind Art Nouveau projects in Havana, Cuba, they were even not qualified enough to be called architects. Spaniards were not directly involved in works in Ponce, Puerto Rico but were an inspiration and a subject of study for local architects in the development of local styles such as Ponce Creole,
- French were behind Art Nouveau in Tunisia (that was a French protectorate then),
- Germans were behind Jugendstil heritage of Lüderitz, Namibia; Qingdao, China,
- Italians were behind Art Nouveau in Valparaíso, Chile; Montevideo, Uruguay; Rio de Janeiro, Brazil,
- Russians were behind Art Nouveau heritage of Harbin, China,
- Art Nouveau Heritage in Lima consists of work of Italians Masperi brothers, French architect Claude Sahut and British masters of stained glass
- Palacio de Bellas Artes in Mexico City was a result of the cooperation of Italians (architect Adamo Boari and sculptor Leonardo Bistolfi), local architect Federico Mariscal, Hungarian artists Aladár Körösfői-Kriesch, Géza Maróti and Miksa Róth, Catalan sculptor Agustí Querol Subirats and French master Edgar Brandt.

Art Nouveau motifs can also be found in French Colonial artchitechture throughout French Indochina.

A notable art movement called Bezalel school appeared in the Palestine region in dating to the late Ottoman and British Mandate periods. It has been described as "a fusion of oriental art and Jugendstil." Several artists associated with the Bezalel school were noted for their Art Nouveau style, including Ze'ev Raban, Ephraim Moses Lilien and Abel Pann.

== Characteristics, decoration and motifs ==
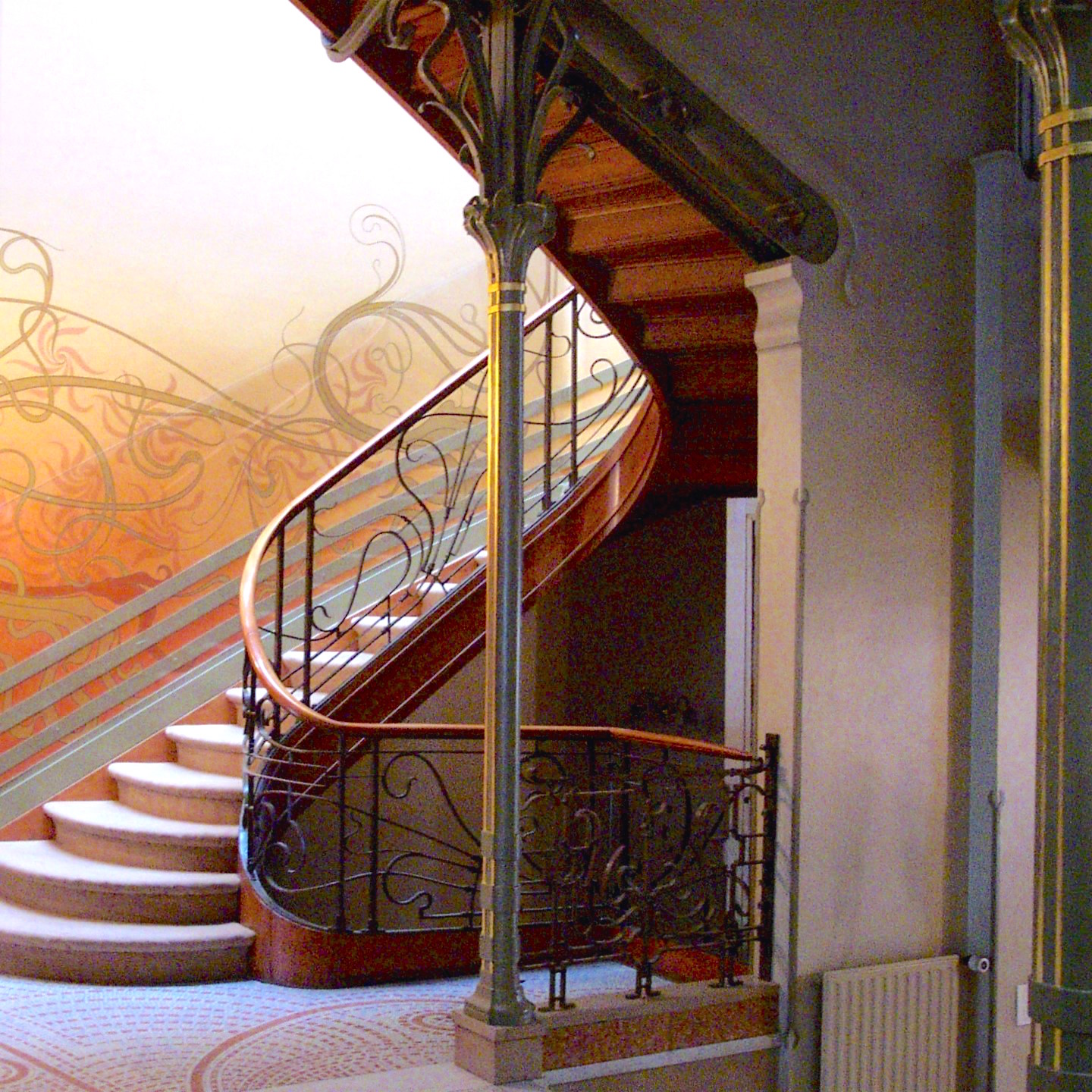
Exposure of structural elements – Hôtel Tassel, Brussels, by Victor Horta (1892–1893)

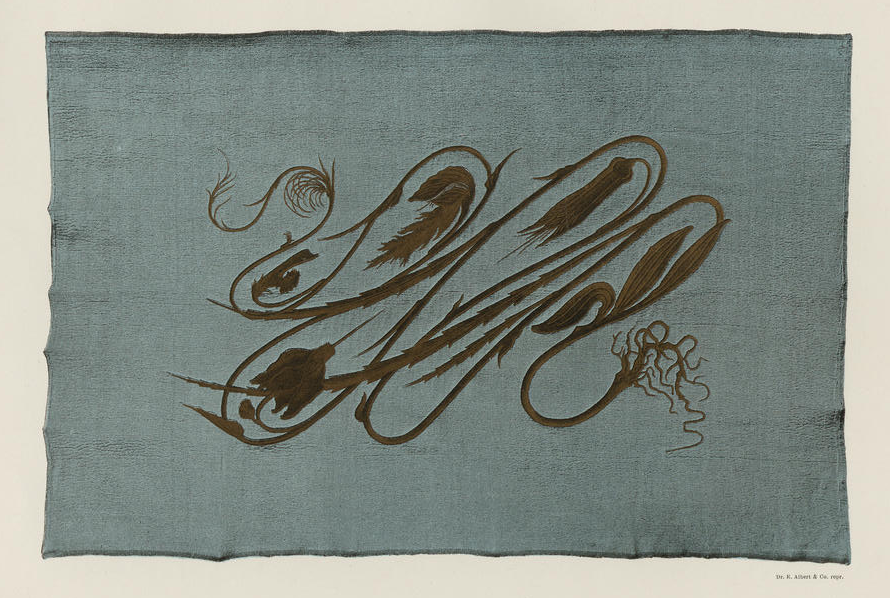
Coup de Fouet or whiplash motif, depicting the stems of cyclamen flowers – Wall tapestry, by Hermann Obrist (1895)

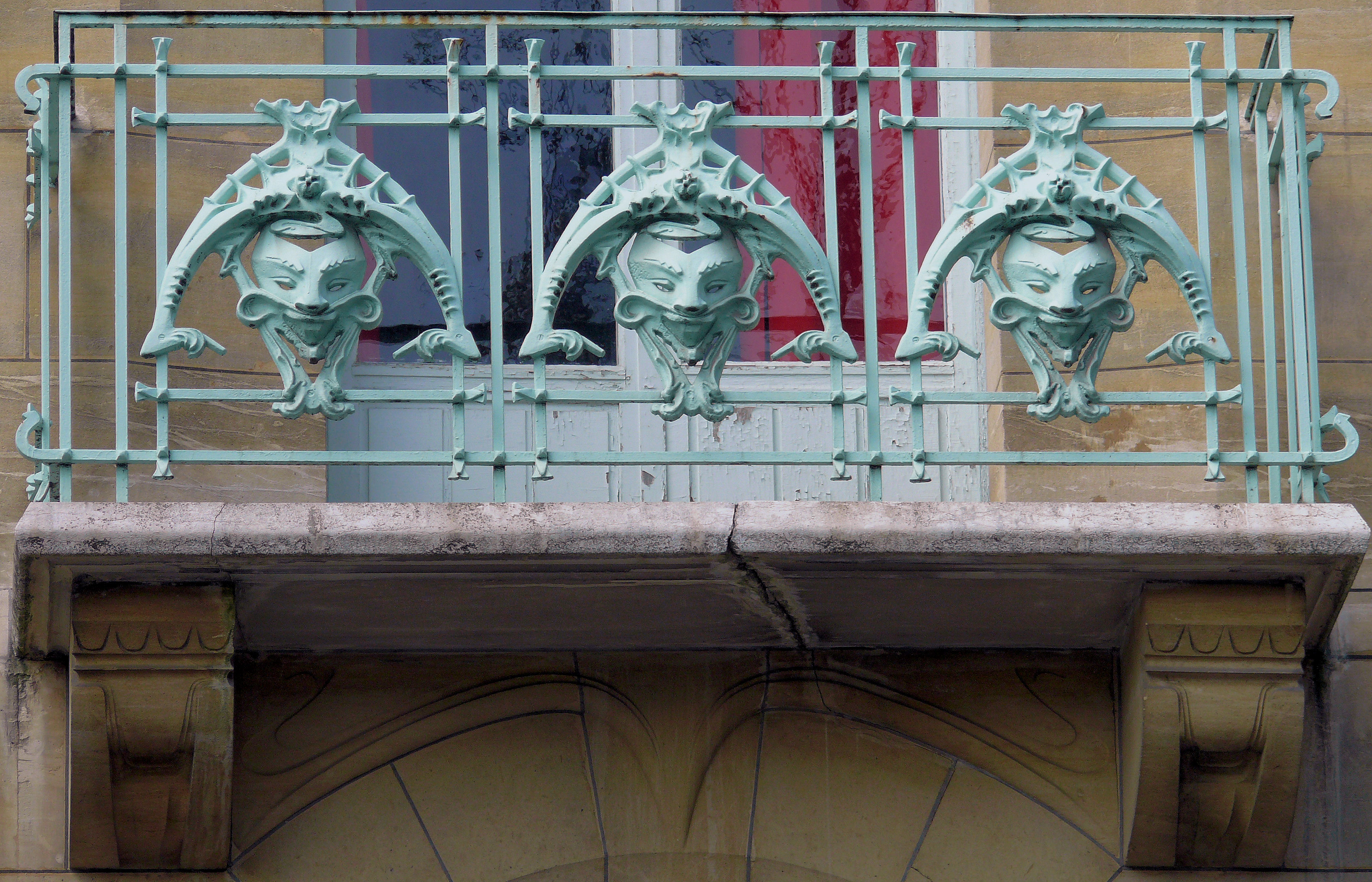
Functional elements transformed into ornament – Pins on the jointings of a balcony of the Castel Béranger (Rue Jean-de-La-Fontaine no. 14, Paris, by Hector Guimard (1895–1898)

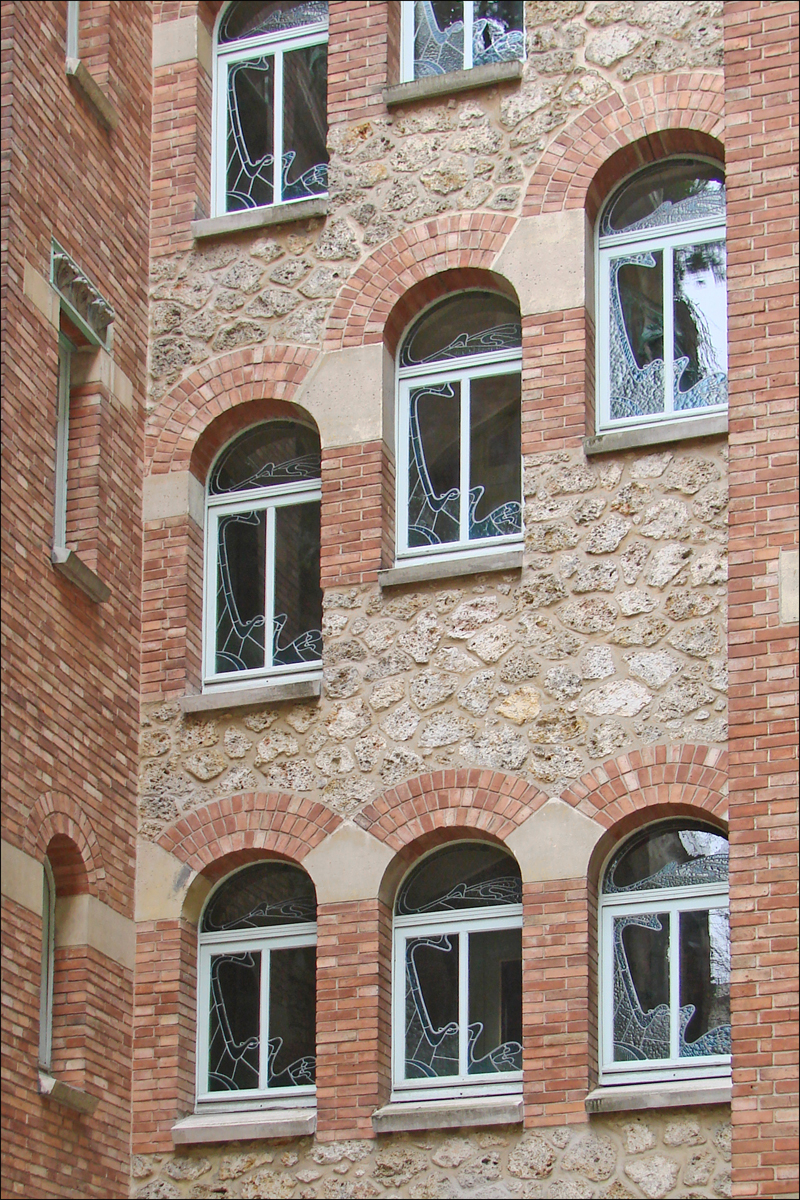
Windows not aligned horizontally, while still looking harmonious – Castel Béranger

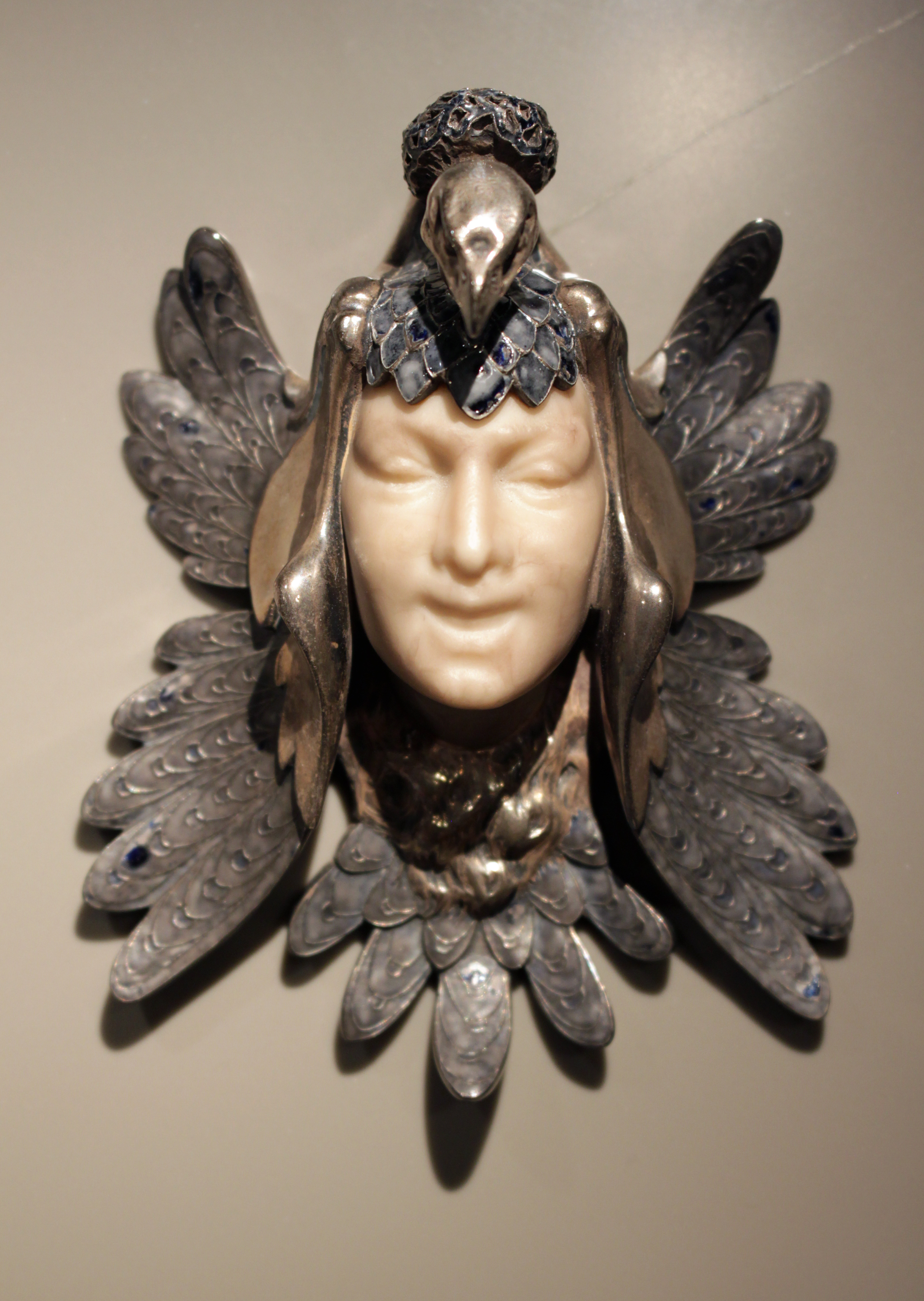
Depiction of the woman as a creature of the night, fused with the natural world – Breast ornament, by René Lalique (1898–1900), Kunstgewerbemuseum Berlin

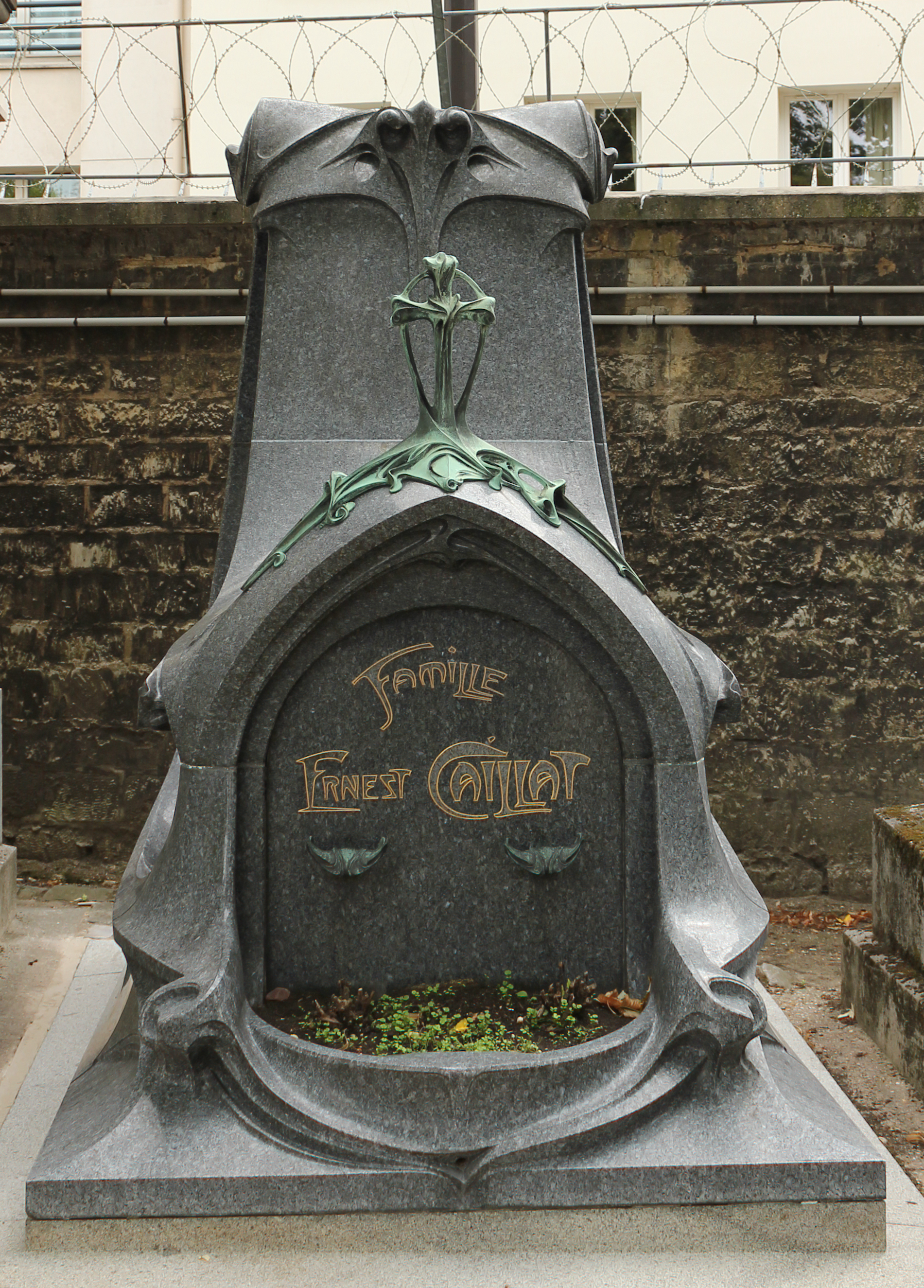
Decorative stylised lettering – Grave of the Caillat Family in Père Lachaise Cemetery, Paris, by Guimard (1899)

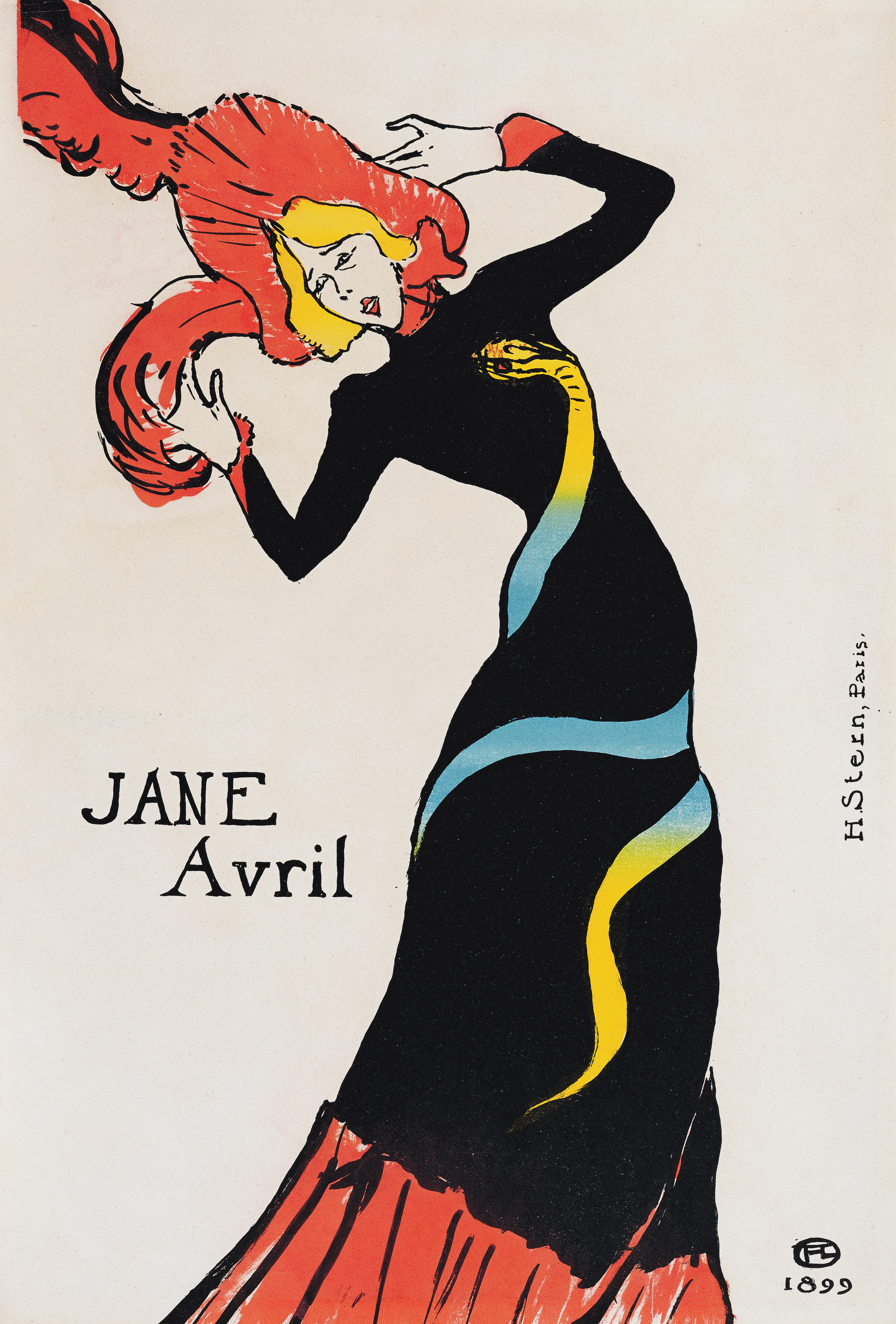
Flat colours and visible outline, inspired by Japanese art – Jane Avril, by Henri de Toulouse-Lautrec (1899), multiple exemplars in different locations

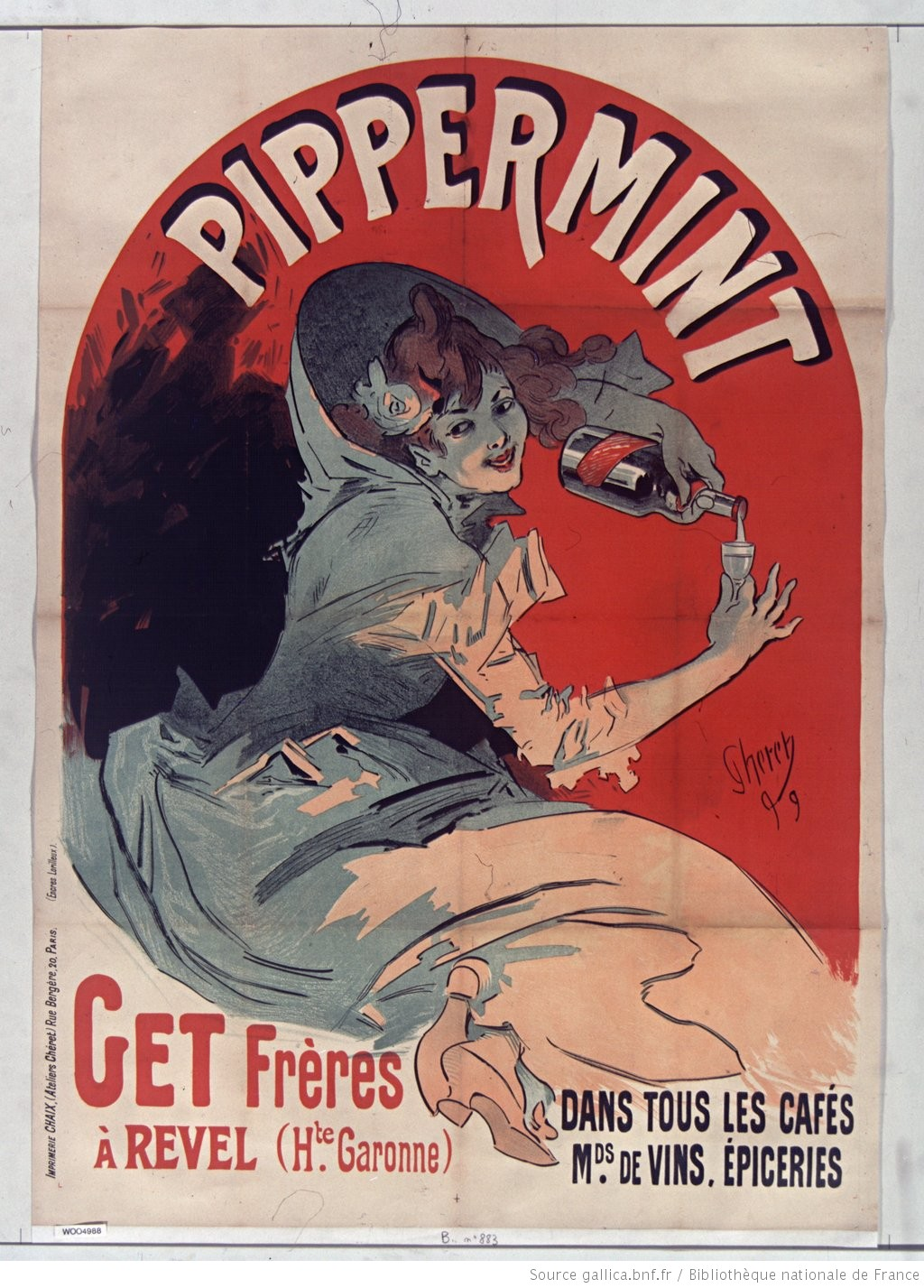
Faded earthy colours – Poster for Pippermint, by Jules Chéret (1899), Bibliothèque nationale de France, Paris

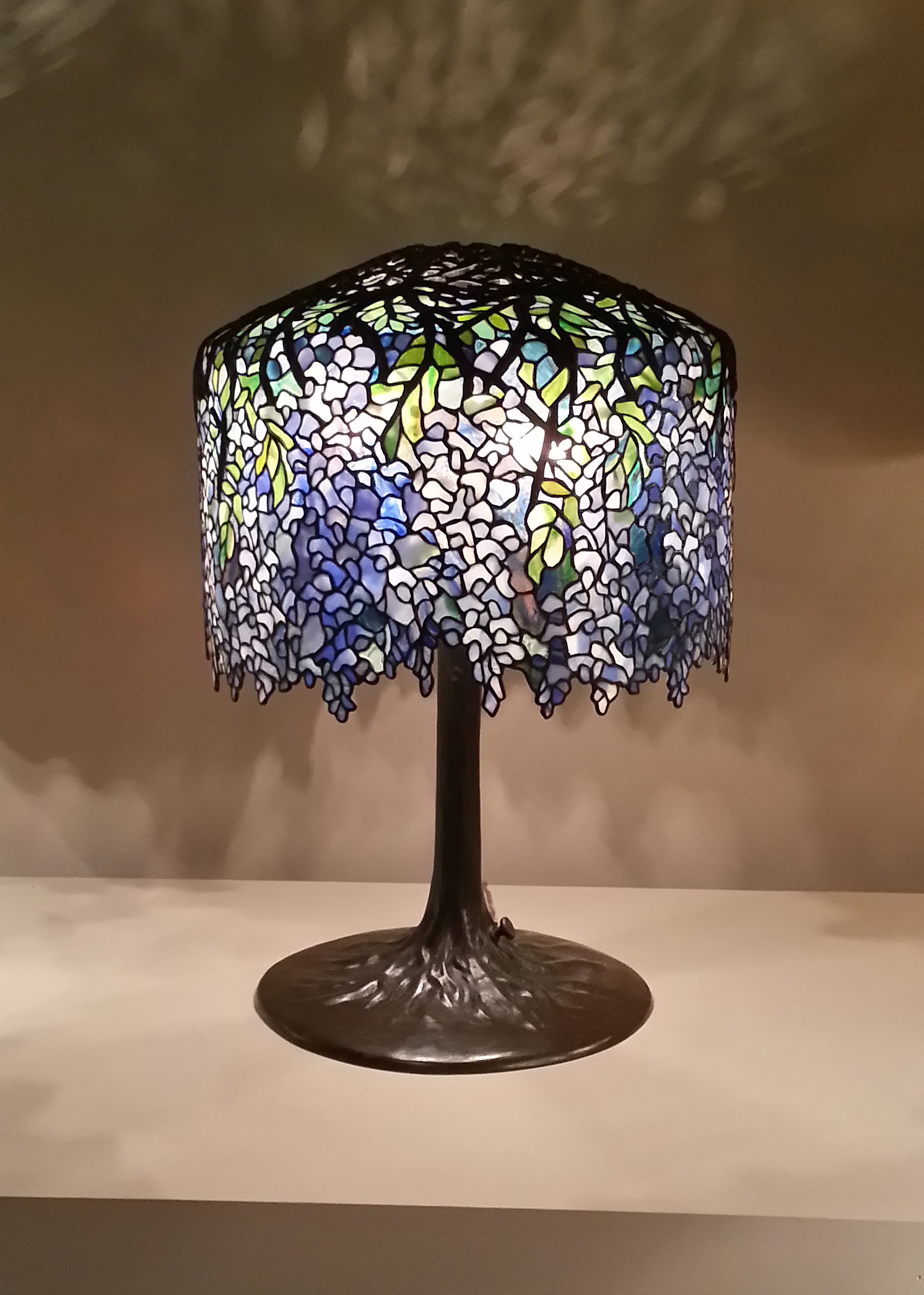
Floral patterns – Lamp with Wisteria design, by Louis Comfort Tiffany (1899–1900), Virginia Museum of Fine Arts, Richmond, US

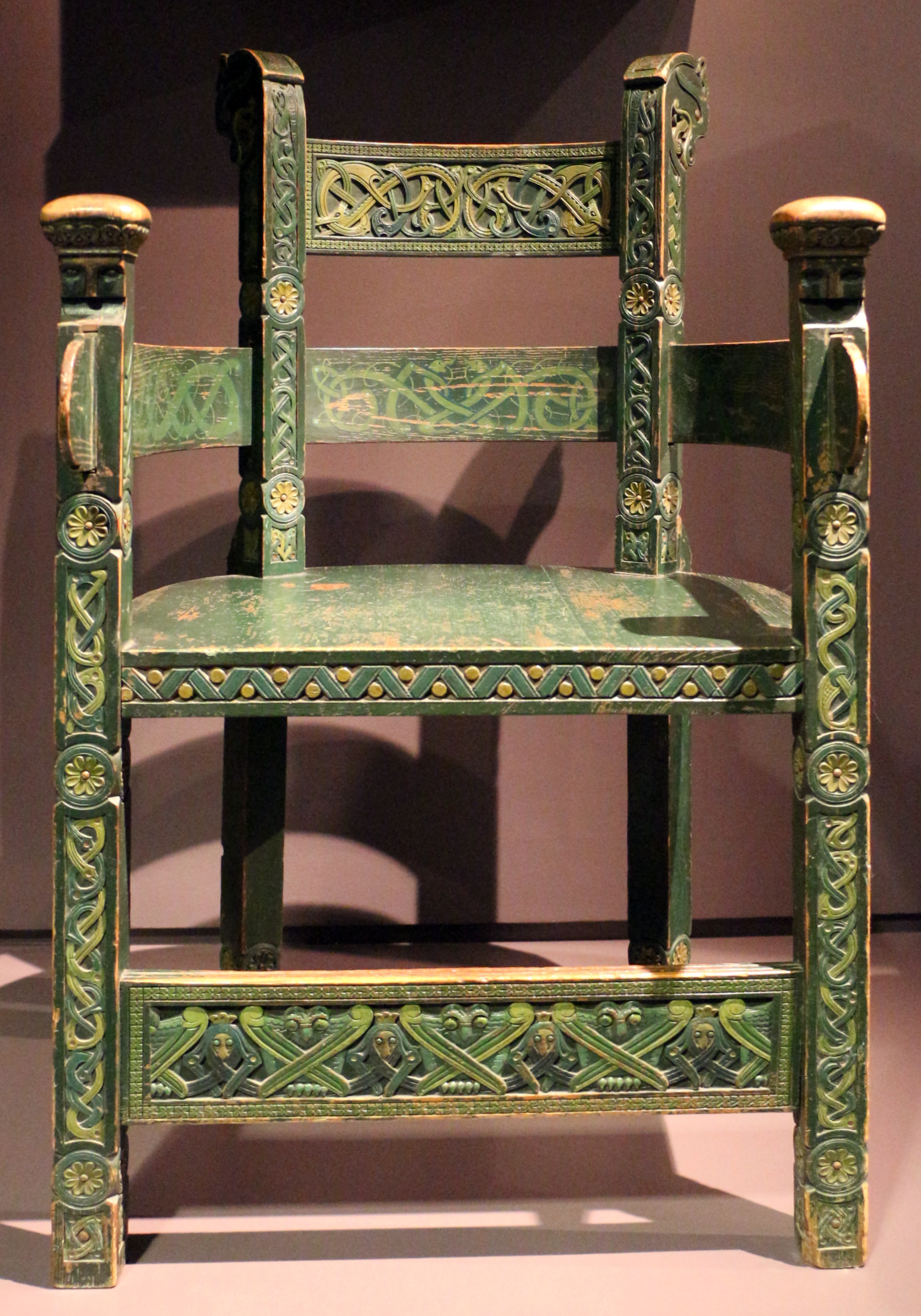
Inspiration taken from folklore and local tradition – Chair, by Lars Kinsarvik (before 1900), Musée d'Orsay, Paris

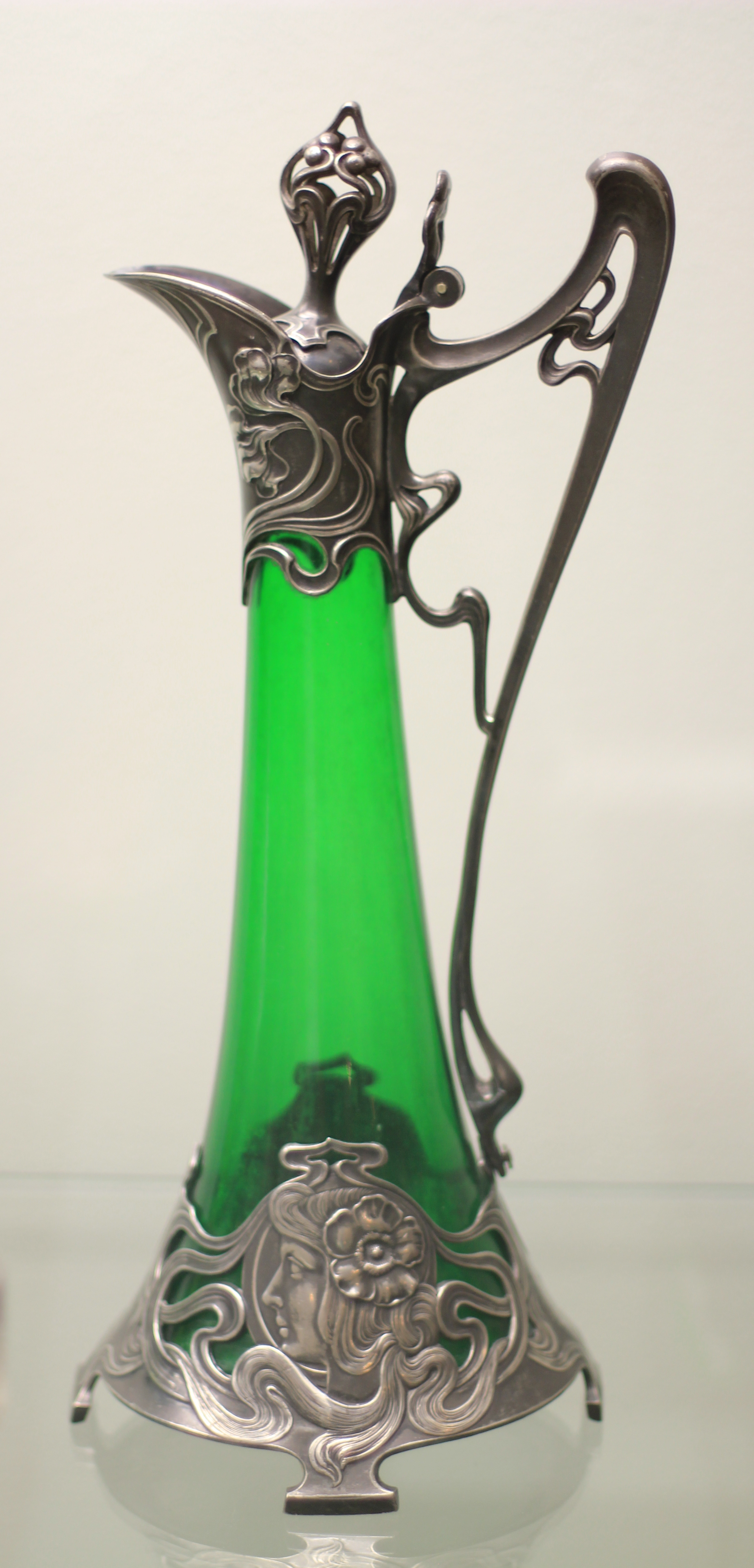
Organic shapes – Carafe, unknown designer (c. 1900), in a temporary exhibition in the Municipal House, Prague

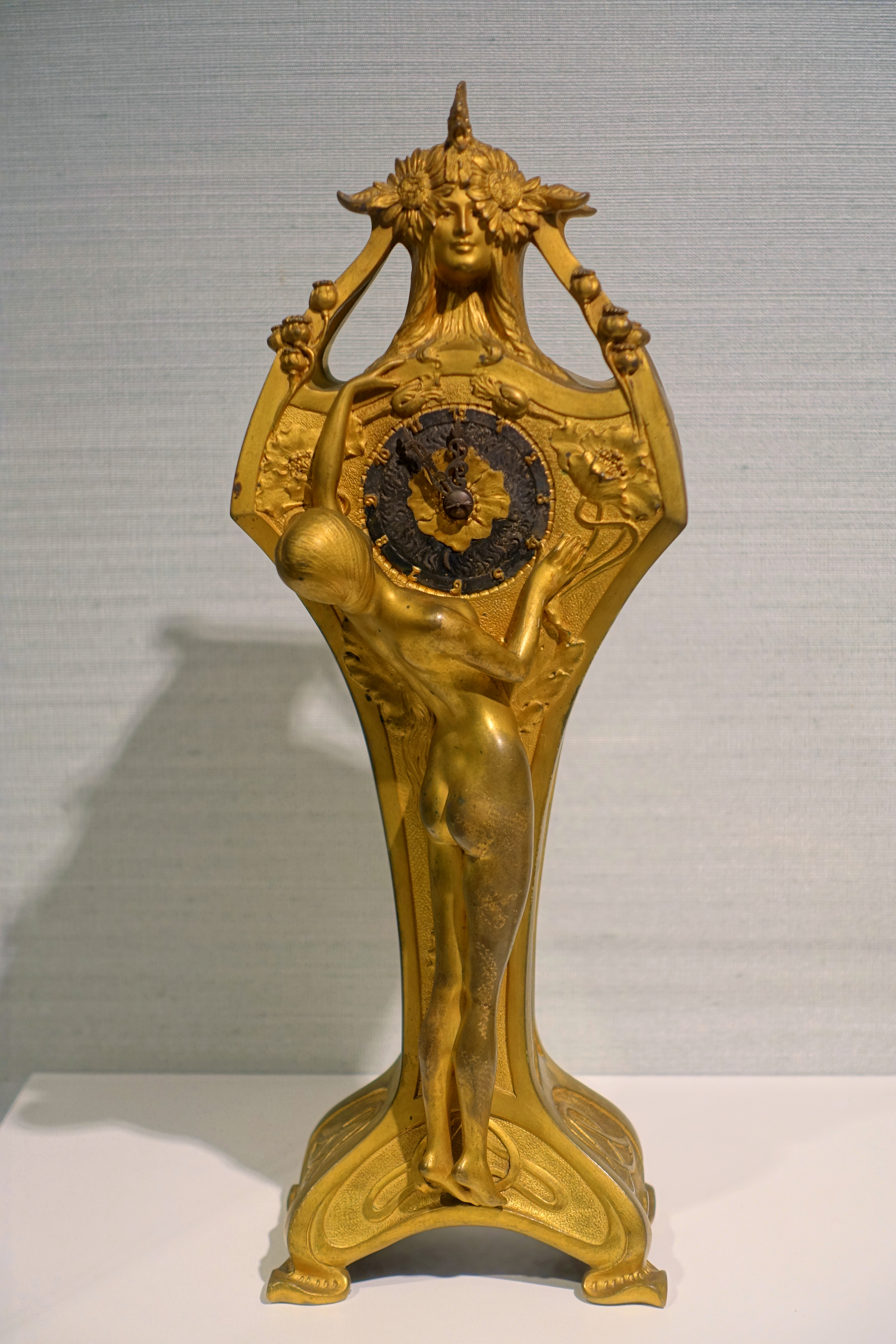
Flowers and plants (in this case poppies and sunflowers) – Mantel clock, by Louis Chalon, E. Colin & Cie. (c. 1900), Hessisches Landesmuseum Darmstadt, Germany

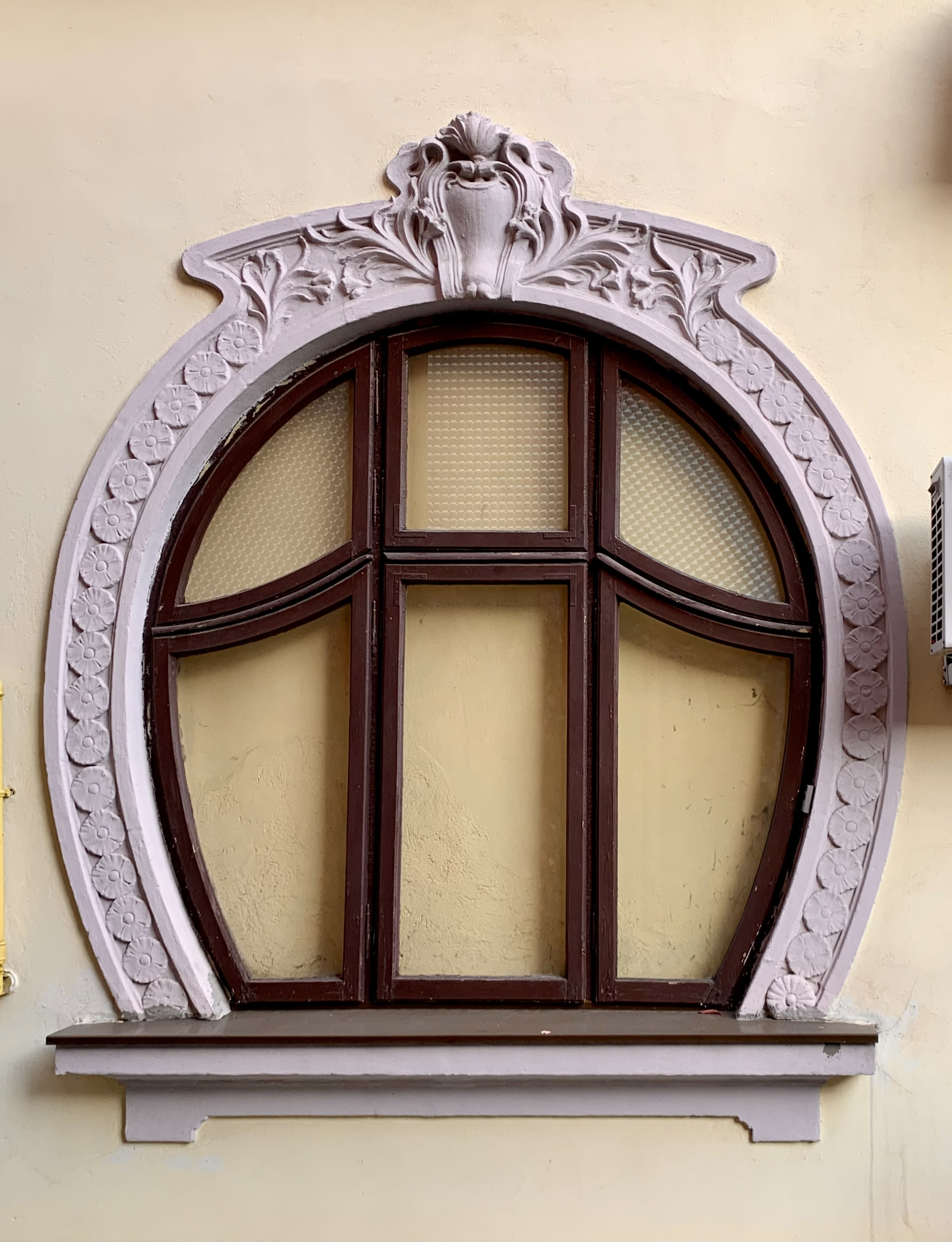
Horseshoe arches, present in both windows and doors, inspired by moon gates (a traditional architectural element in Chinese gardens) – Window of Strada Jules Michelet no. 21 in Bucharest, unknown architect (c. 1900)

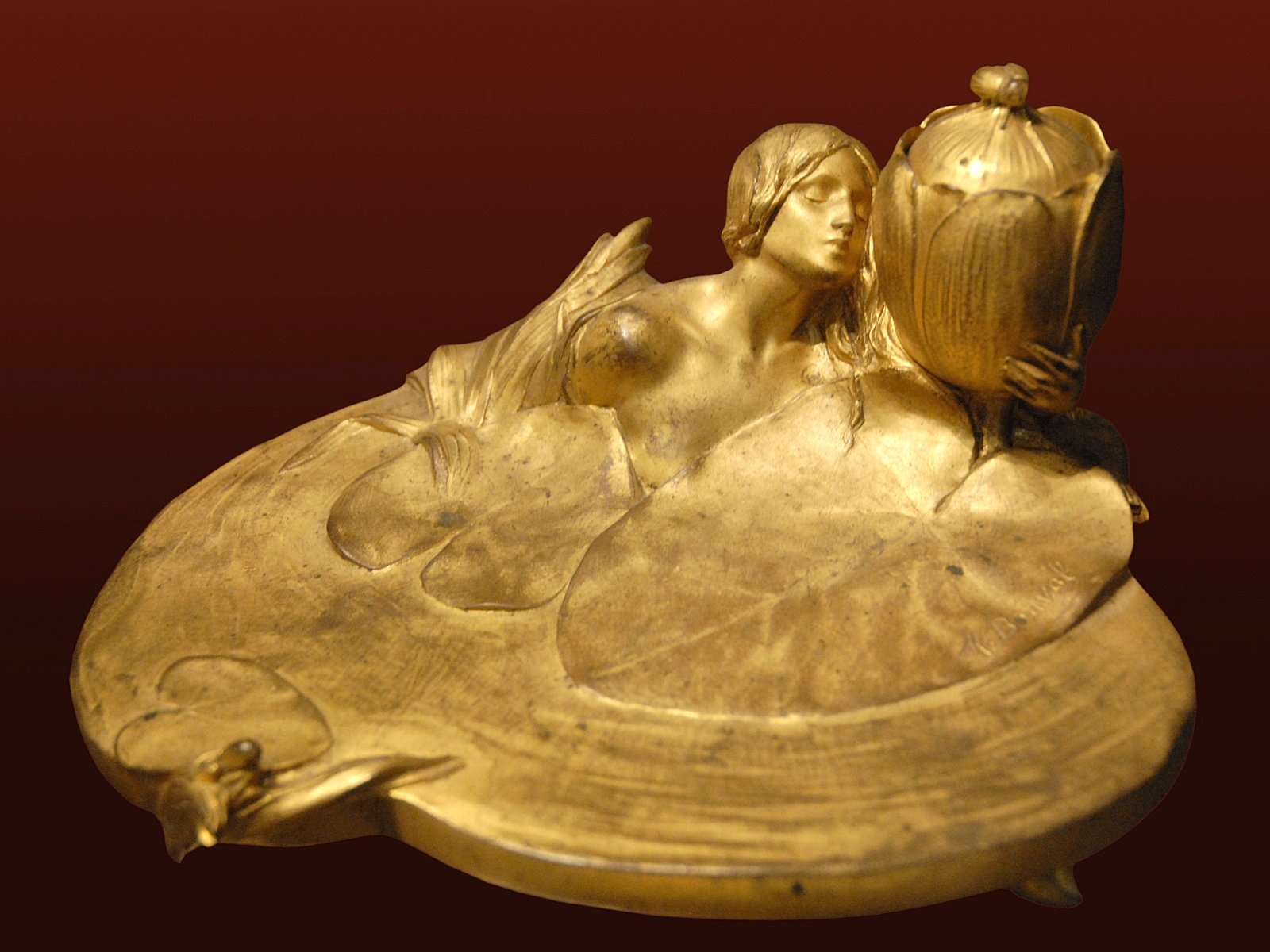
Asymmetry (not just objects, but also buildings) – Inkwell, by Maurice Bouval (c. 1900), Musée d'Orsay

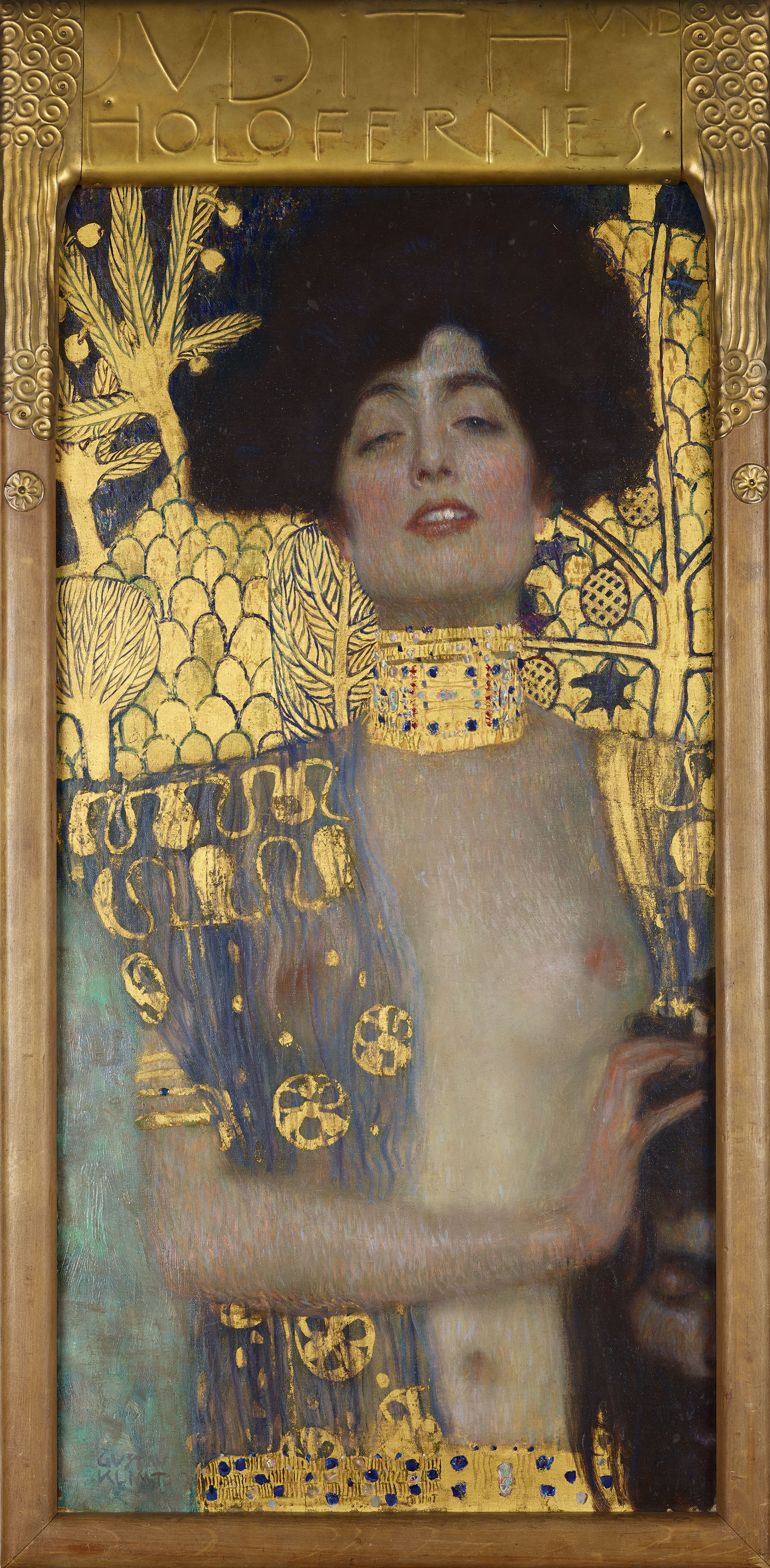
The femme fatale – Judith I, by Gustav Klimt (1901), Österreichische Galerie Belvedere, Vienna

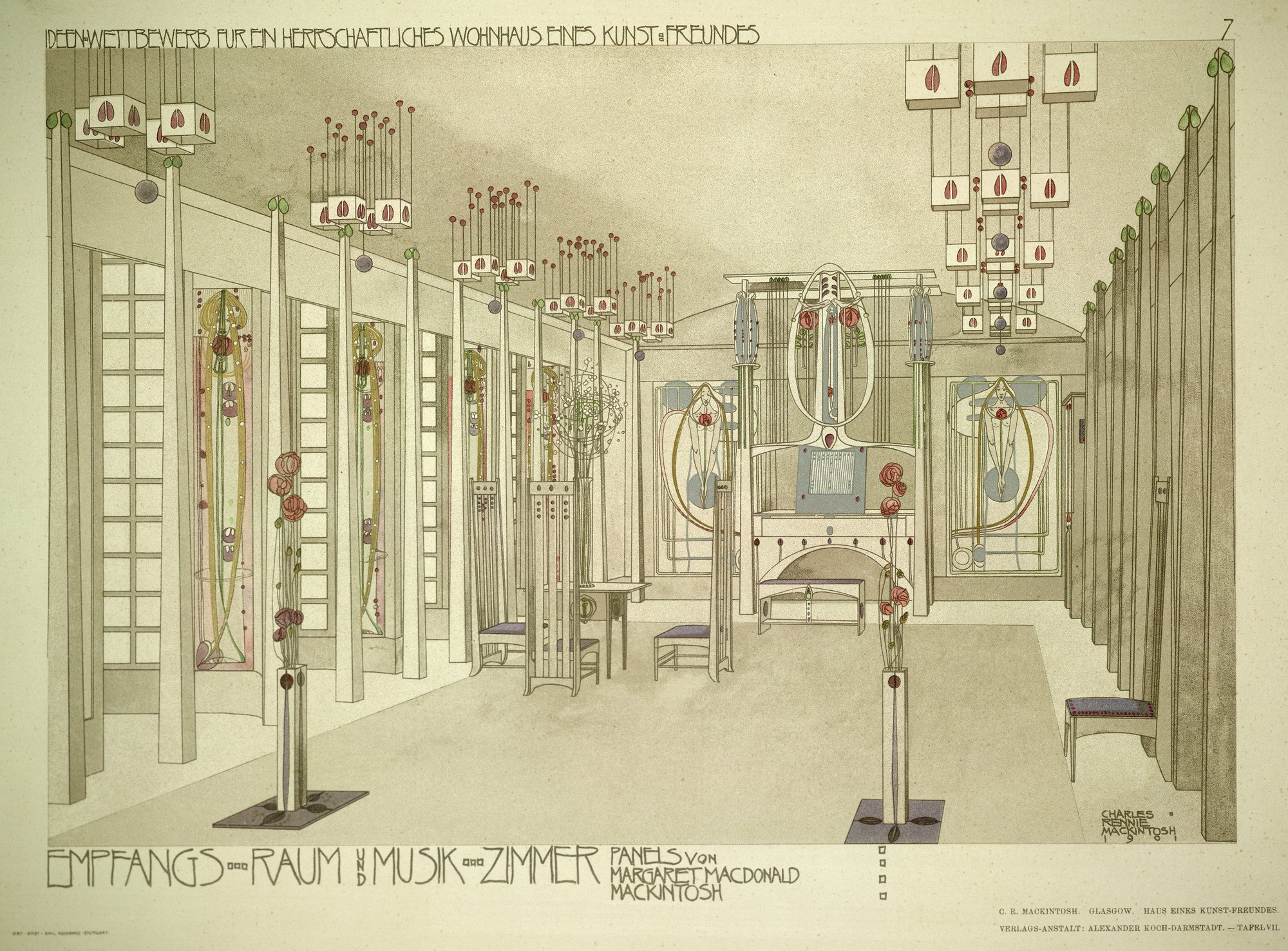
Gesamtkunstwerk (literally 'total artwork'), which refers to everything being designed to fit together, from carpets to wallpaper, and from room compartmentation to light fixtures – Design for a house of an art lover, by Charles Rennie Mackintosh and Margaret Macdonald Mackintosh (1901)

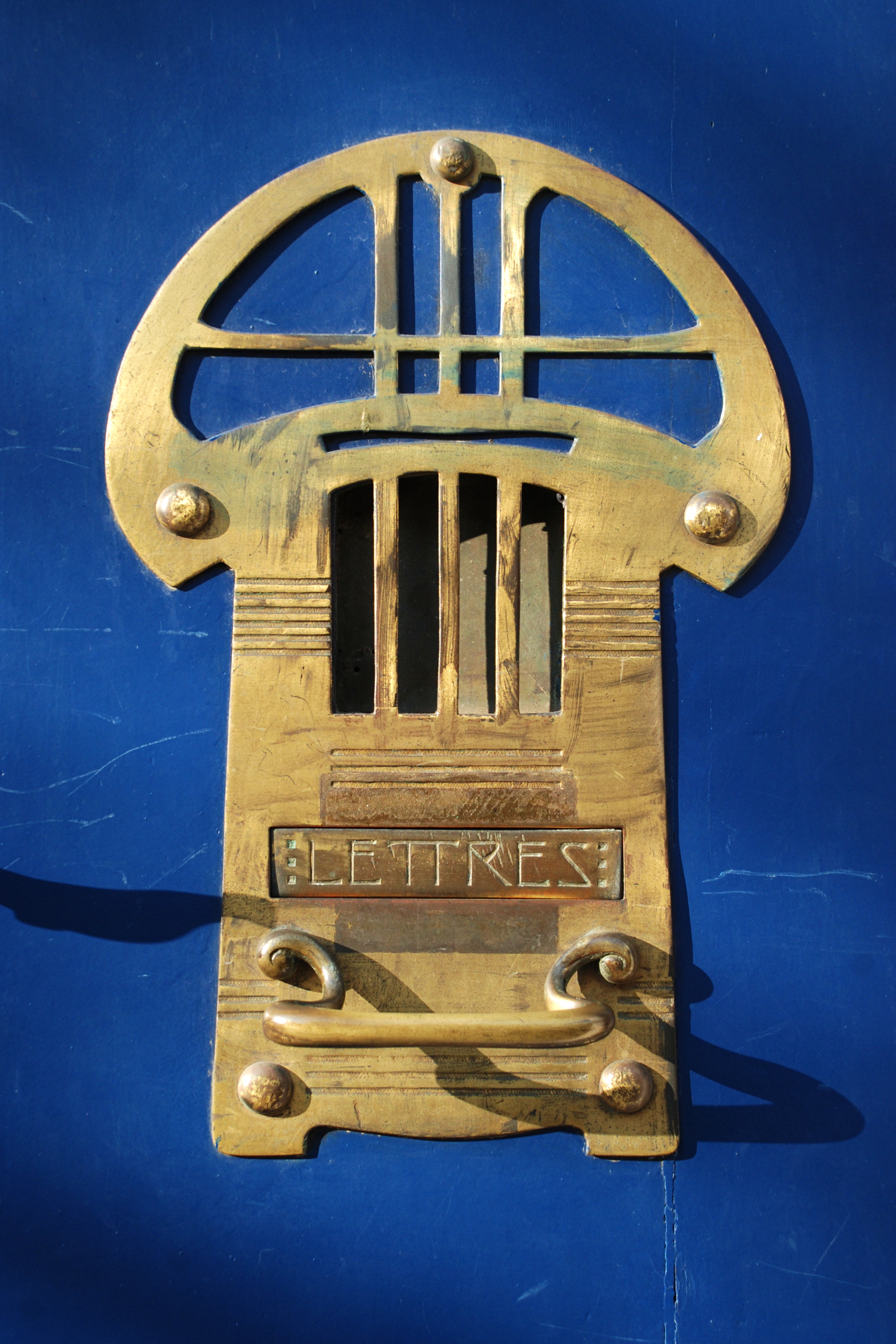
Combinations of rectangular shapes, straight or almost straight lines, with sinuous organic shapes (like ovals that are asymmetric horizontally) - door handle of the House of Paul Verdussen (Avenue Brugmann no. 211) in Brussels, by Paul Hamesse (1901)

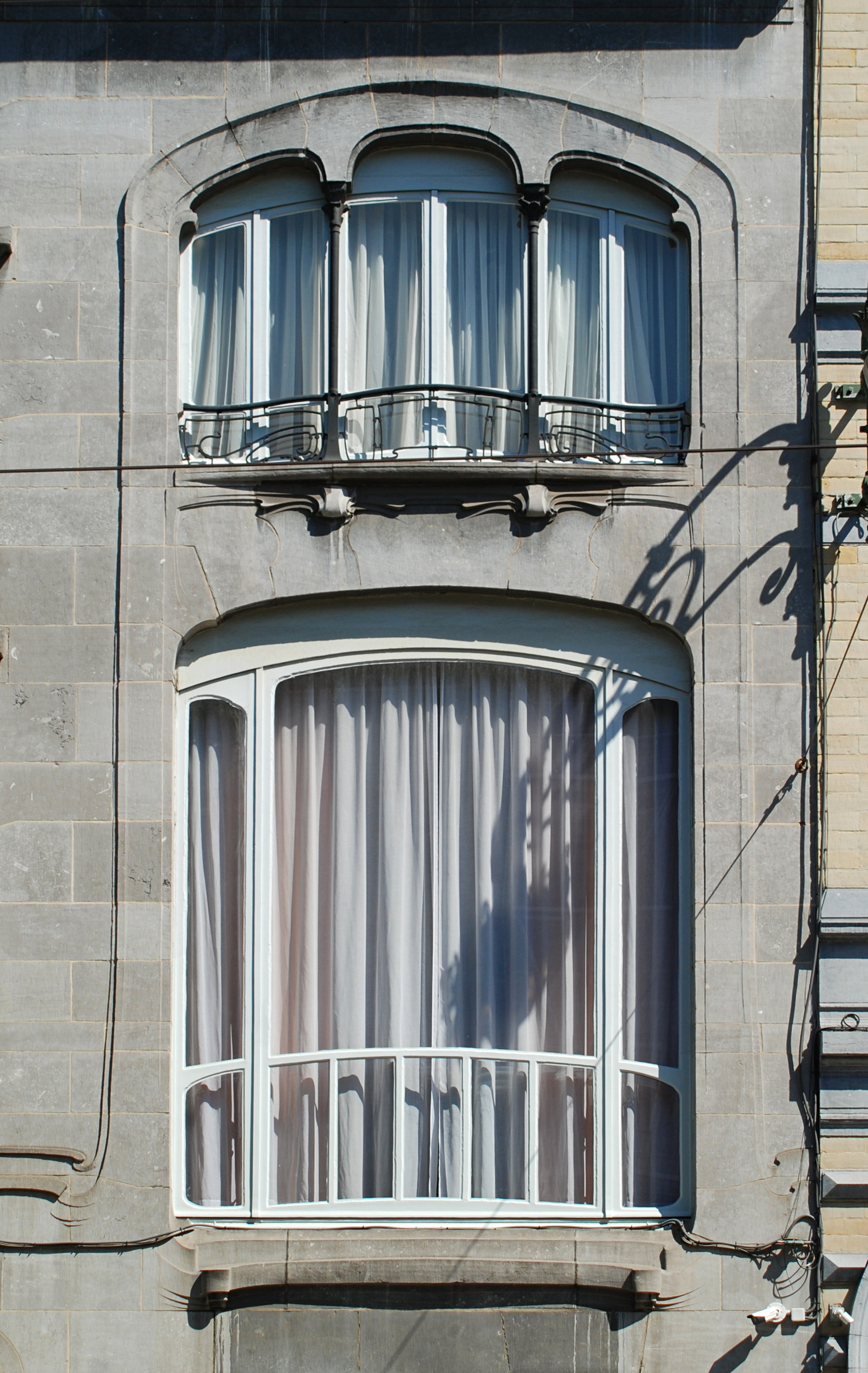
Sinous oblate arches – Windows of the Fernand Dubois House (Avenue Brugmann no. 80) in Brussels, by Horta (1901–1903)

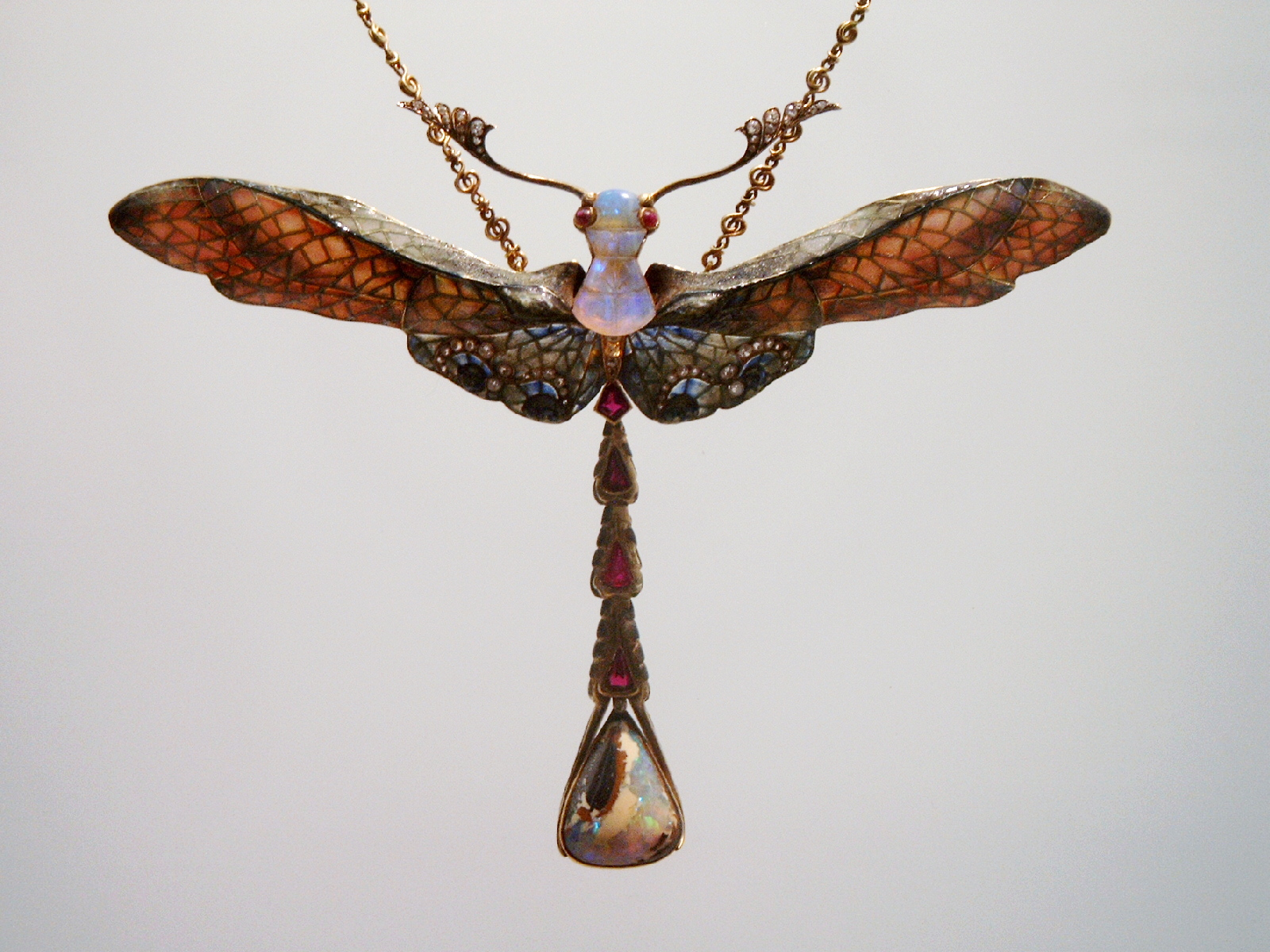
Insects – Libelle ('Dragonfly'), pendant made of gold, opal, enamel, rubies and diamonds by Philippe Wolfers (1902)

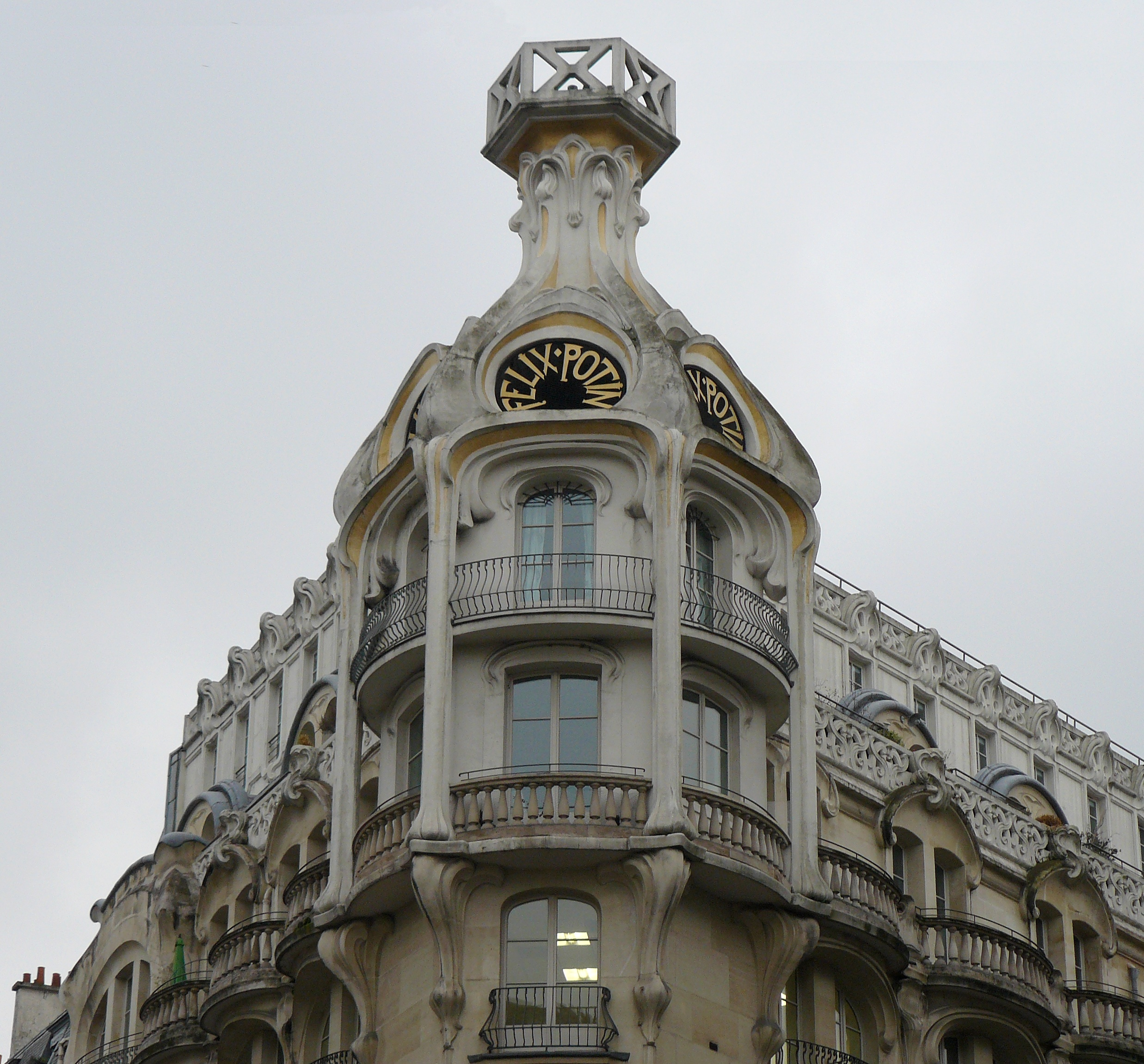
Sinuous onion-shaped tops – Félix Potin Building (Rue de Rennes no. 140–140bis) in Paris, by Paul Auscher (1904)

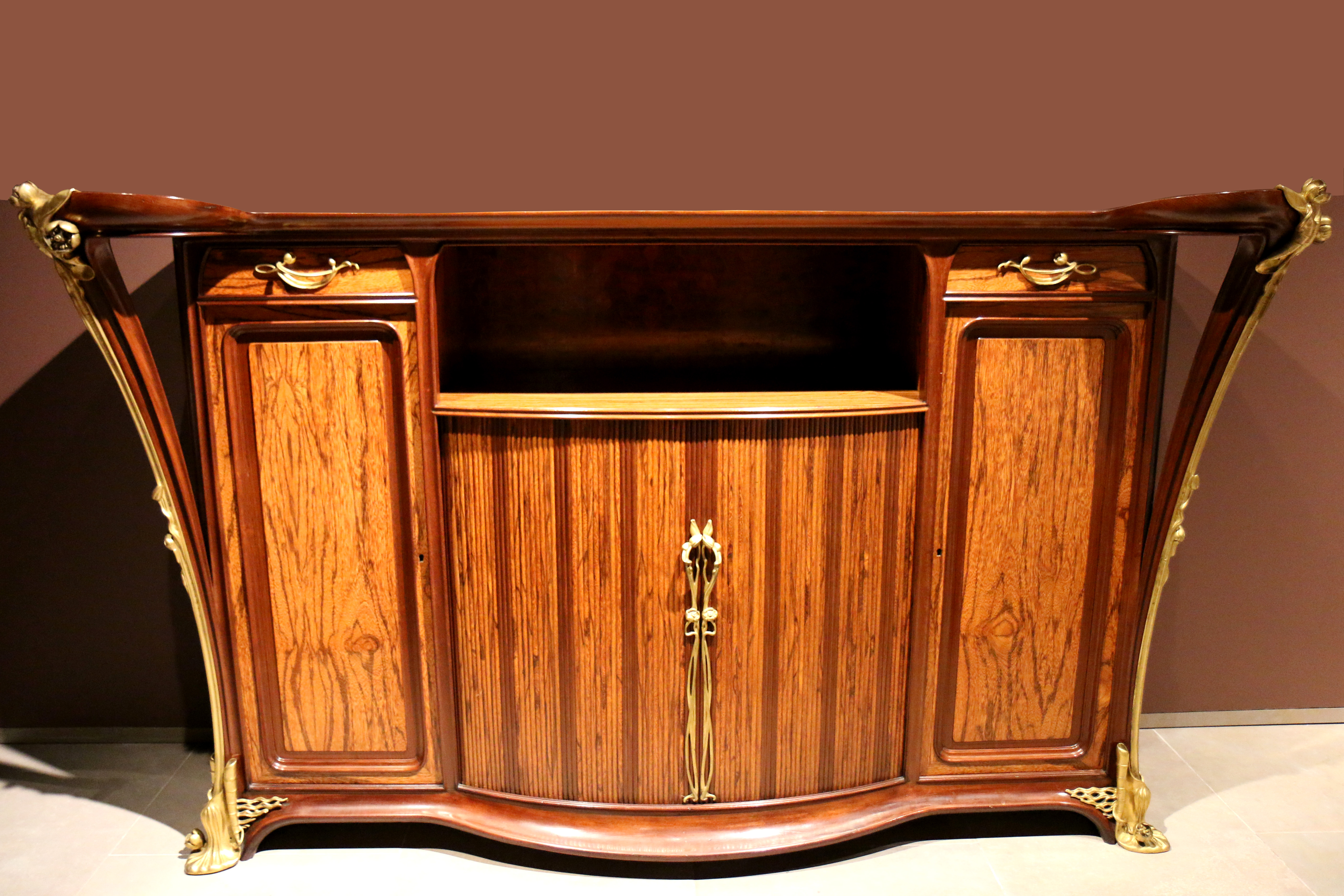
Exotic materials and decoration – Mahogany and amourette wood cabinet with water lily decoration of gilded bronze, by Louis Majorelle (1905–1908), Fin-de-Siècle Museum, Brussels

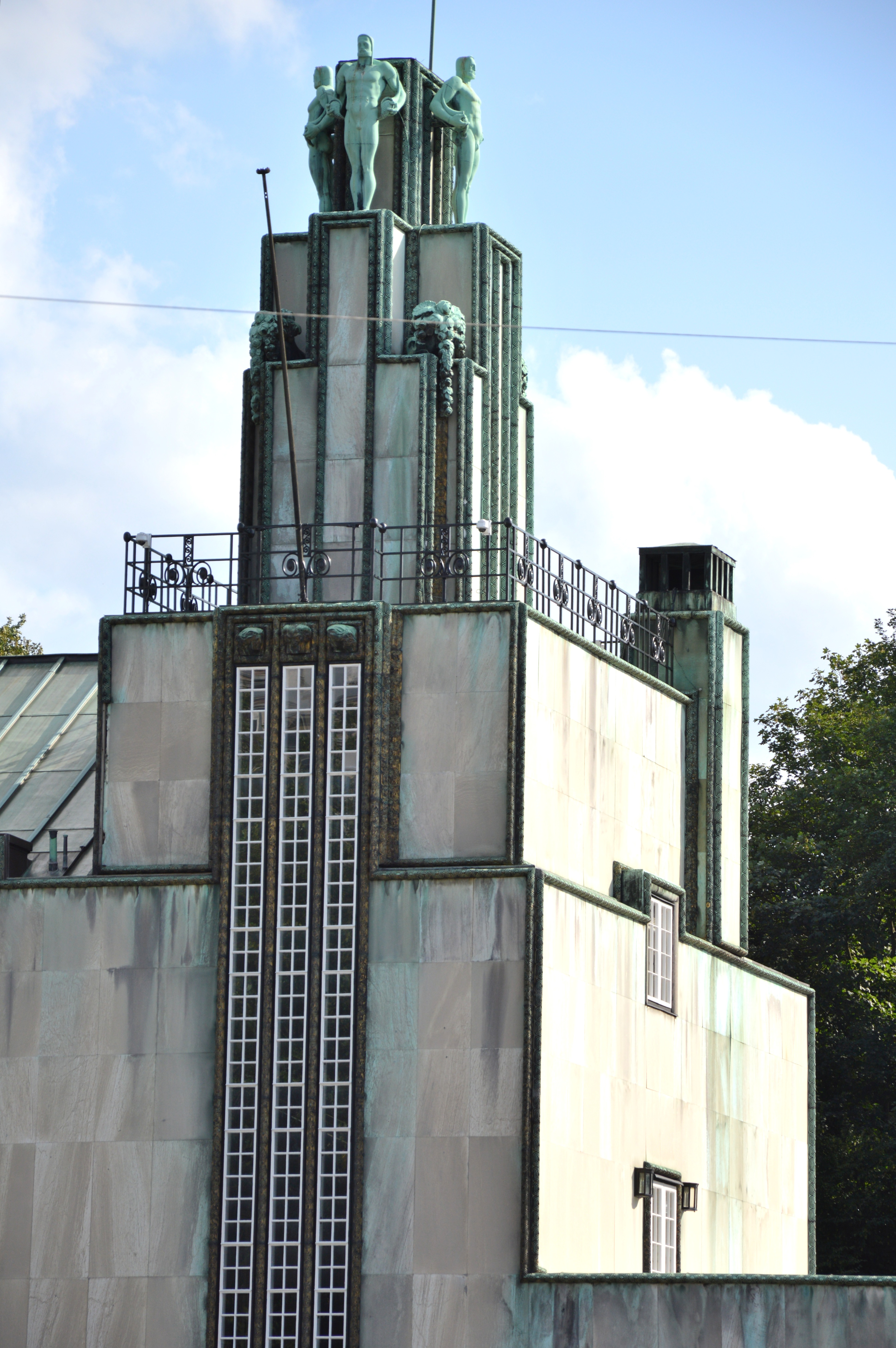
Geometric lines (a key feature of the Vienna Secession and the Glasgow School) – Stoclet Palace in Brussels, by Josef Hoffmann (1905–1911)

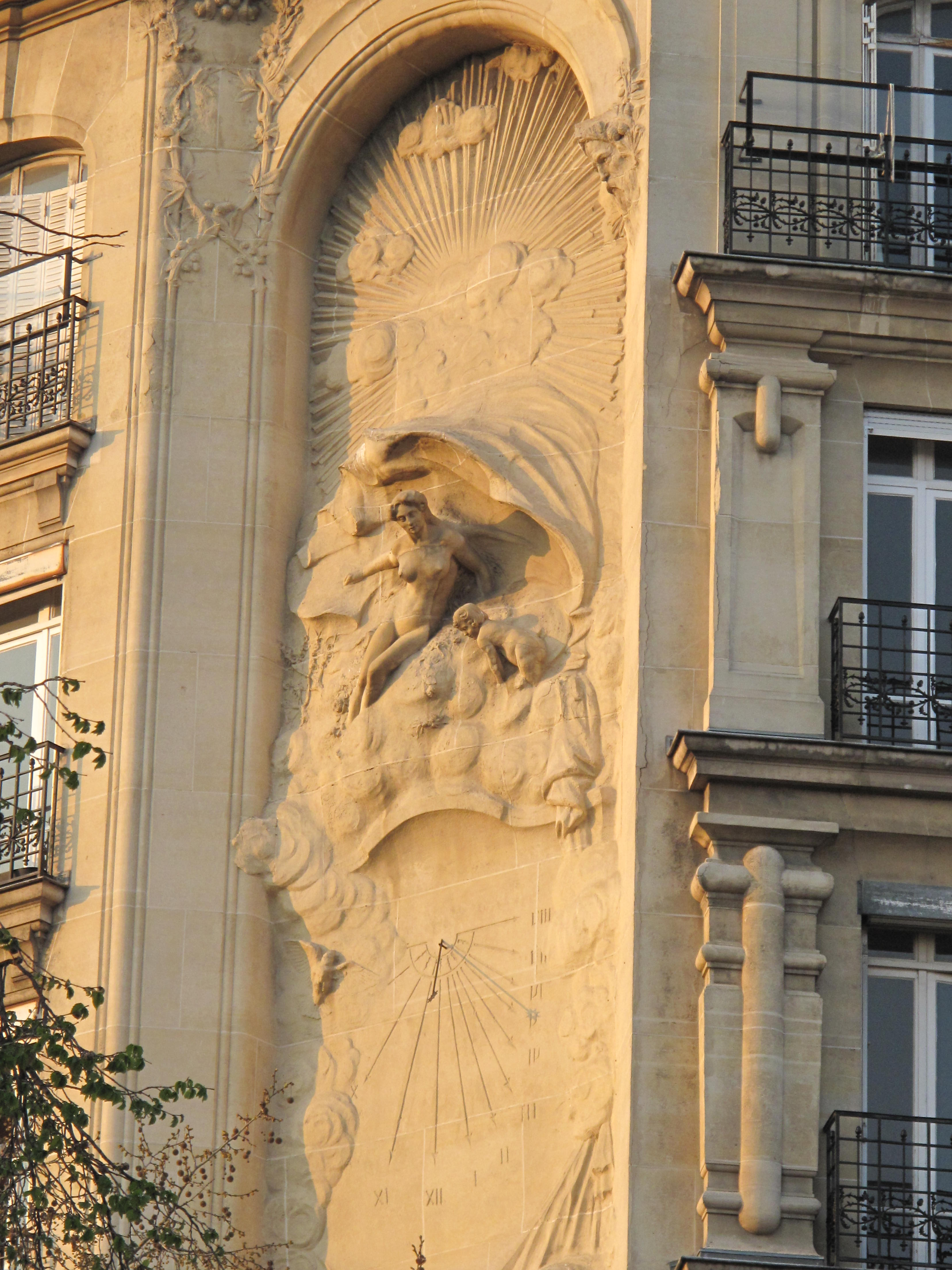
Ethereal scenes (used especially in reliefs on buildings and objects, and in posters) – Façade of Rue Perrée no. 18 in Paris, by Raymond Barbaud and Édouard Bauhain (1908)

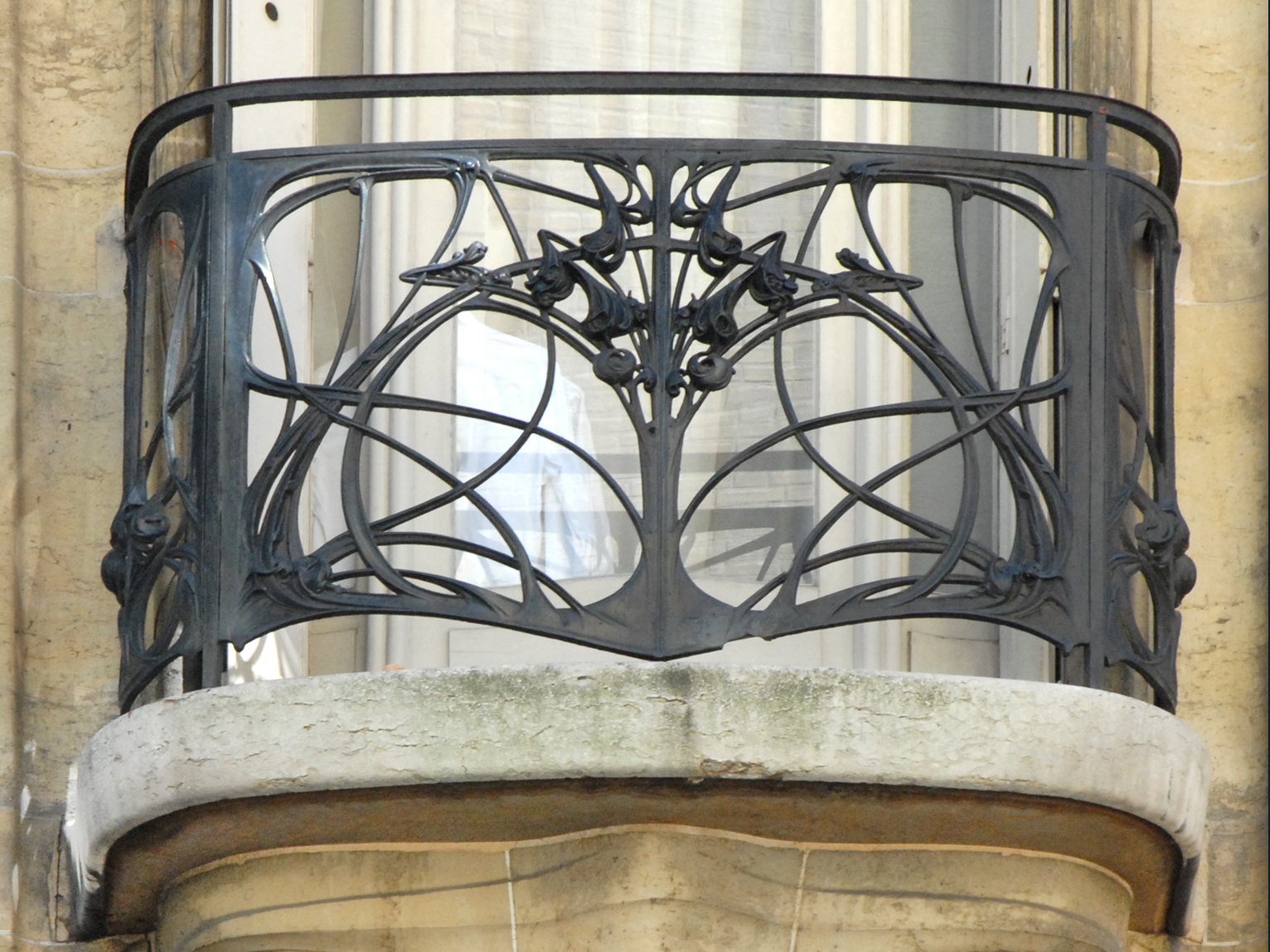
Highly stylised plant motifs, nearly abstract – Balcony of the Hôtel Guimard (Avenue Mozart no. 122) in Paris, by Guimard (1909)

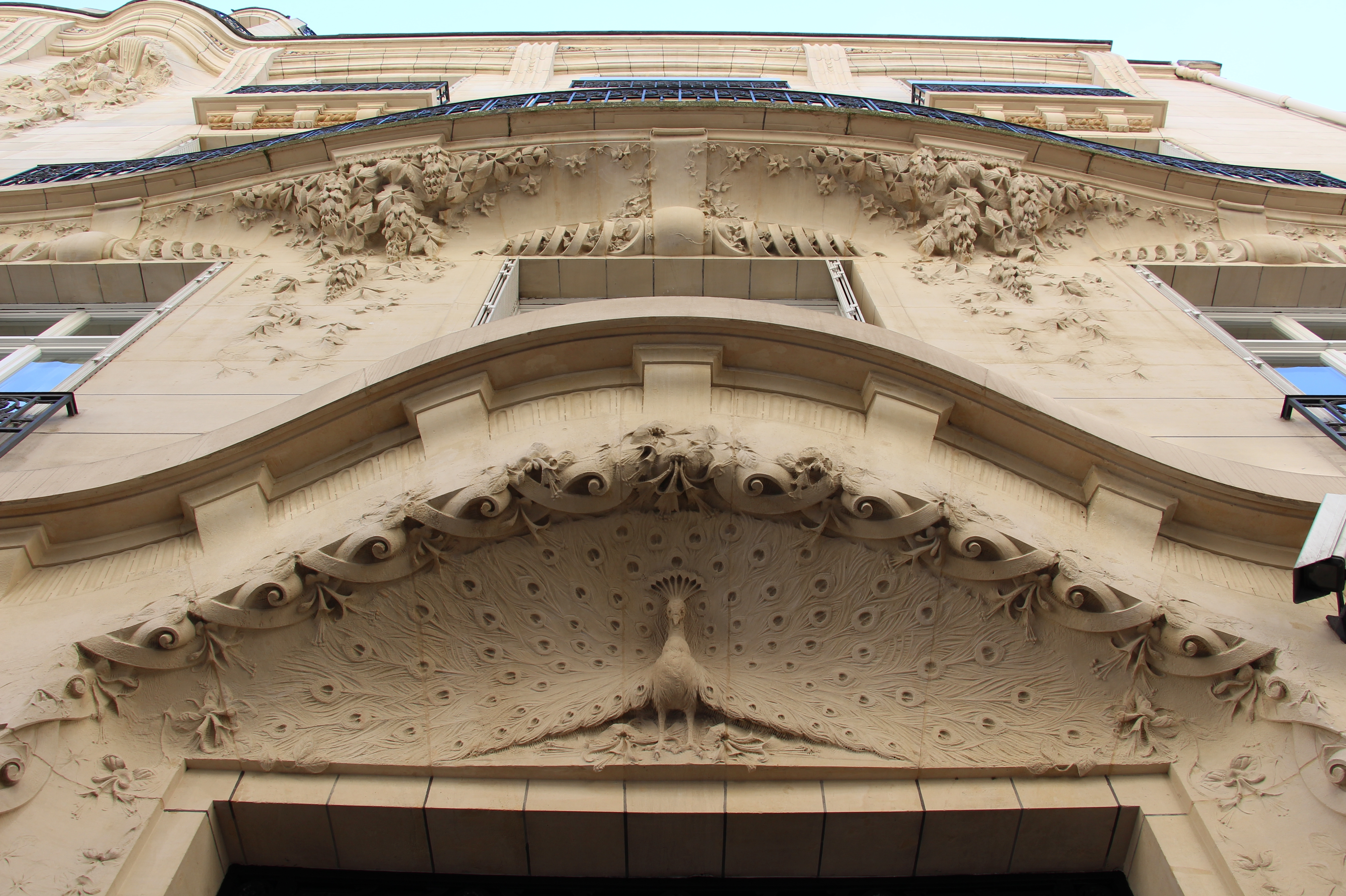
Peacocks and motifs inspired by their feathers (and sometimes other animals) – Relief above the door of Rue Octave-Feuillet no. 19 in Paris, by Maurice Du Bois d’Auberville (1910)

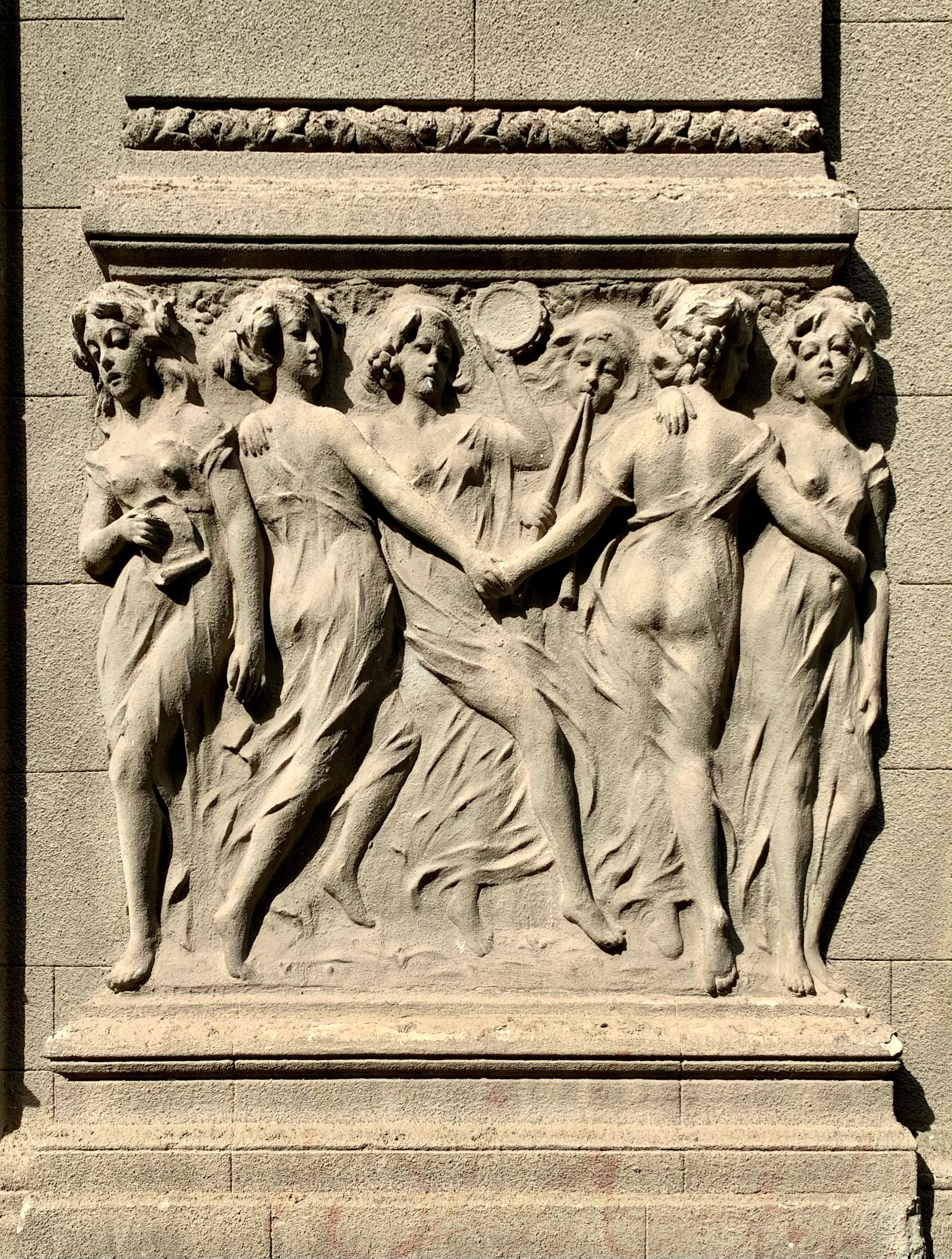
Nymphs – Relief on the Fanny and Isac Popper House (Strada Sfinților no. 1), Bucharest, by Alfred Popper (1914)

Early Art Nouveau, particularly in Belgium and France, was characterized by undulating, curving forms inspired by lilies, vines, flower stems and other natural forms, used in particular in the interiors of Victor Horta and the decoration of Louis Majorelle and Émile Gallé. It also drew upon patterns based on butterflies and dragonflies, borrowed from Japanese art, which were popular in Europe at the time.

Early Art Nouveau also often featured more stylised forms expressing movement, such as the coup de fouet or "whiplash" line, depicted in the cyclamen plants drawn by designer Hermann Obrist in 1894. A description published in Pan magazine of Hermann Obrist's wall hanging Cyclamen (1894), compared it to the "sudden violent curves generated by the crack of a whip," The term "whiplash", though it was originally used to ridicule the style, is frequently applied to the characteristic curves employed by Art Nouveau artists. Such decorative undulating and flowing lines in a syncopated rhythm and asymmetrical shape, are often found in the architecture, painting, sculpture, and other forms of Art Nouveau design.

Other floral forms were popular, inspired by lilies, wisteria and other flowers, particularly in the lamps of Louis Comfort Tiffany and the glass objects made by the artists of the School of Nancy and Émile Gallé. Other curving and undulating forms borrowed from nature included butterflies, peacocks, swans, and water lilies. Many designs depicted women's hair intertwined with stems of lilies, irises and other flowers. Stylised floral forms were particularly used by Victor Horta in carpets, balustrades, windows, and furniture. They were also used extensively by Hector Guimard for balustrades, and, most famously, for the lamps and railings at the entrances of the Paris Metro. Guimard explained: "That which must be avoided in everything that is continuous is the parallel and symmetry. Nature is the greatest builder and nature makes nothing that is parallel and nothing that is symmetrical."

Earlier Art Nouveau furniture, such as that made by Louis Majorelle and Henry van de Velde, was characterized by the use of exotic and expensive materials, including mahogany with inlays of precious woods and trim, and curving forms without right angles. It gave a sensation of lightness.

In the second phase of Art Nouveau, following 1900, the decoration became purer and the lines were more stylised. The curving lines and forms evolved into polygons and then into cubes and other geometric forms. These geometric forms were used with particular effect in the architecture and furniture of Joseph Maria Olbrich, Otto Wagner, Koloman Moser and Josef Hoffmann, especially the Stoclet Palace in Brussels, which announced the arrival of Art Deco and modernism.

Another characteristic of Art Nouveau architecture was the use of light, by opening up of interior spaces, by the removal of walls, and the extensive use of skylights to bring a maximum amount of light into the interior. Victor Horta's residence-studio and other houses built by him had extensive skylights, supported on curving iron frames. In the Hotel Tassel he removed the traditional walls around the stairway, so that the stairs became a central element of the interior design.

== Relationship with contemporary styles and movements ==
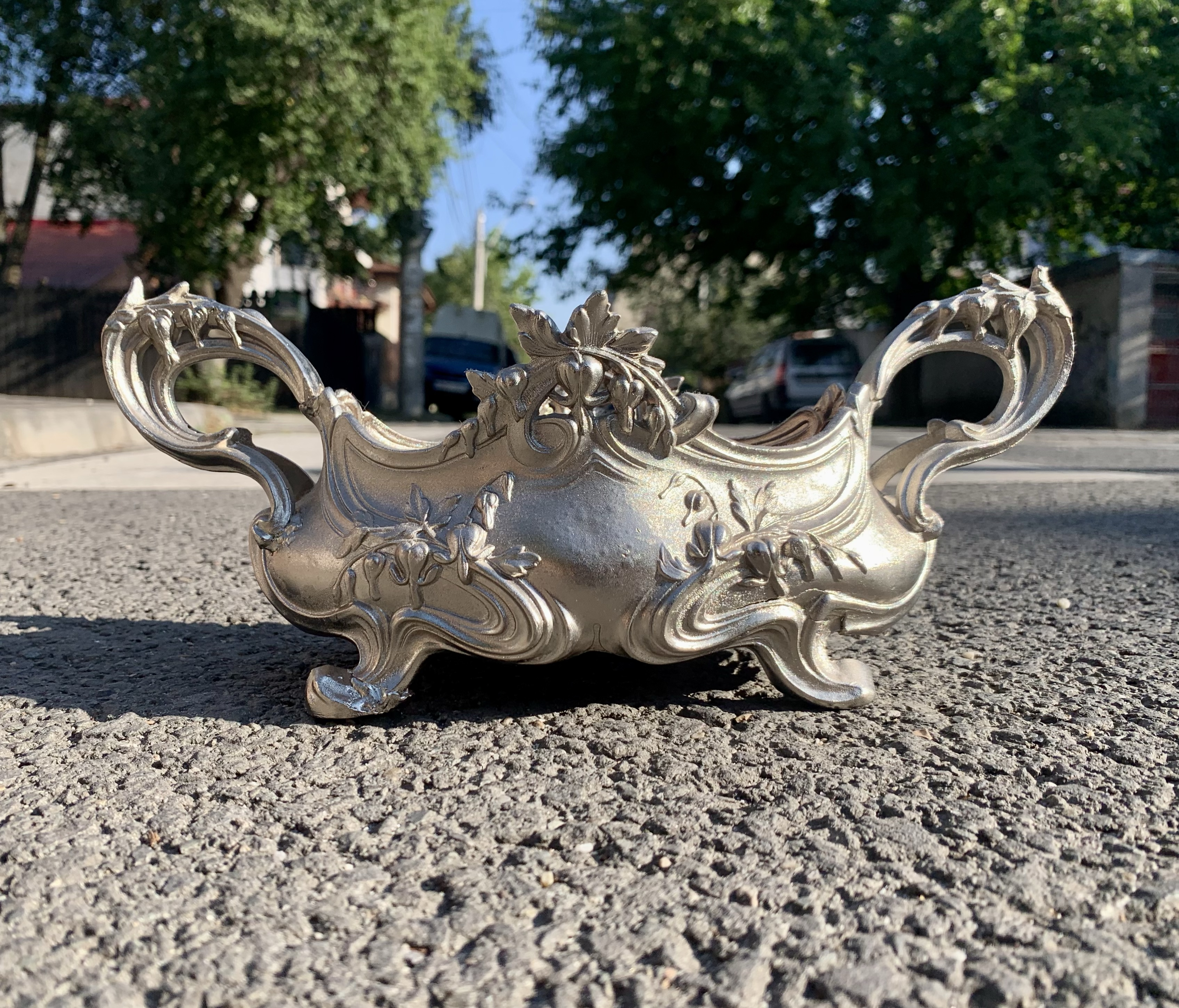
Mix of Art Nouveau and Rococo Revival – Jardinière, with a shape that is similar to that of Rococo examples (c. 1900), private collection

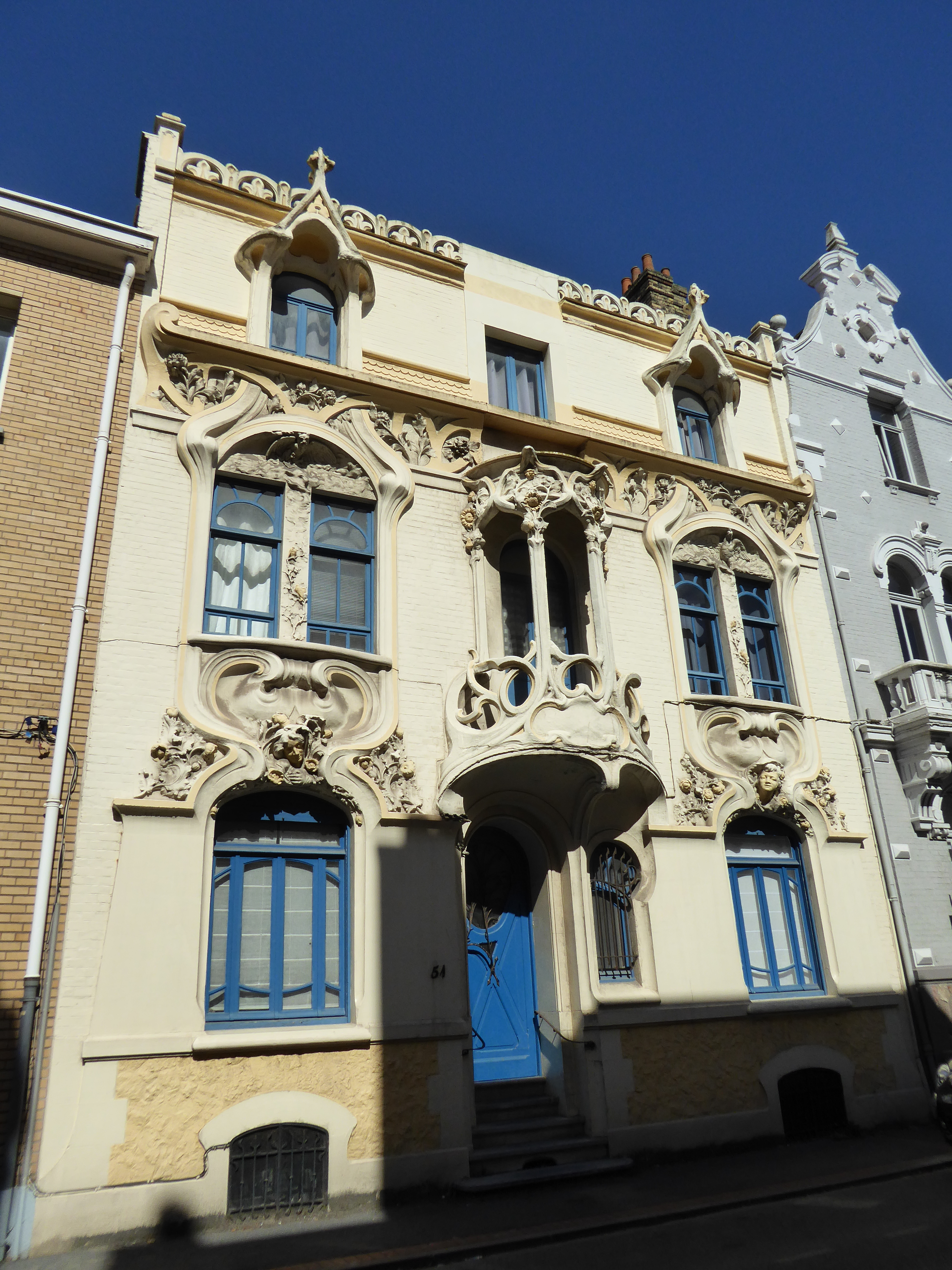
Mix of Art Nouveau and Gothic Revival – Rue Gustave-Lemaire no. 51 in Dunkirk, France, with pointed arched-dormer windows and balcony loggia, unknown architect, decorated with sculptures by Maurice Ringot (1903–1910)

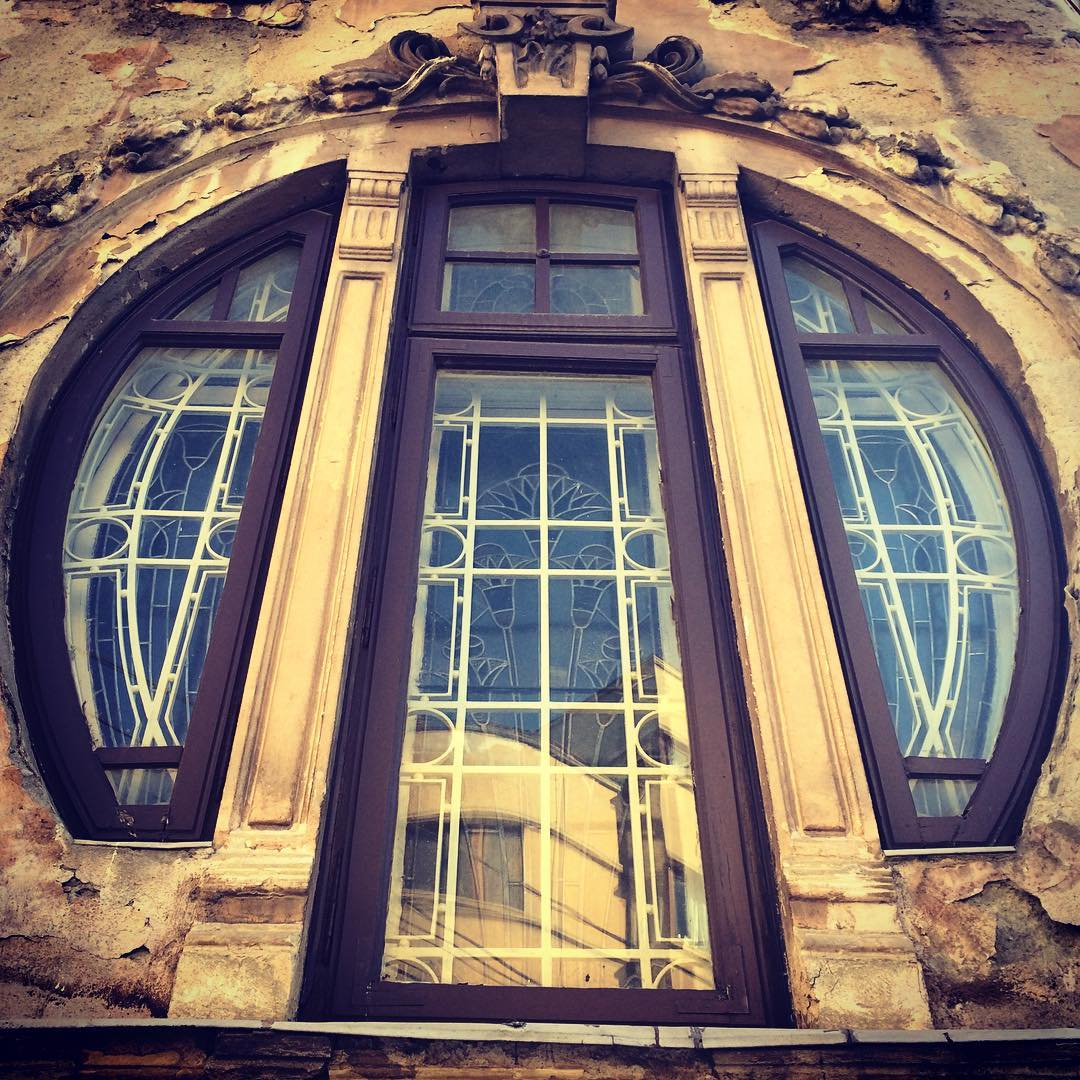
Mix of Art Nouveau and Egyptian Revival – Round corner window of the Romulus Porescu House (Strada Doctor Paleologu no. 12) in Bucharest, decorated with lotus flowers, a motif used frequently in Ancient Egyptian art, designed by Dimitrie Maimarolu (1905)

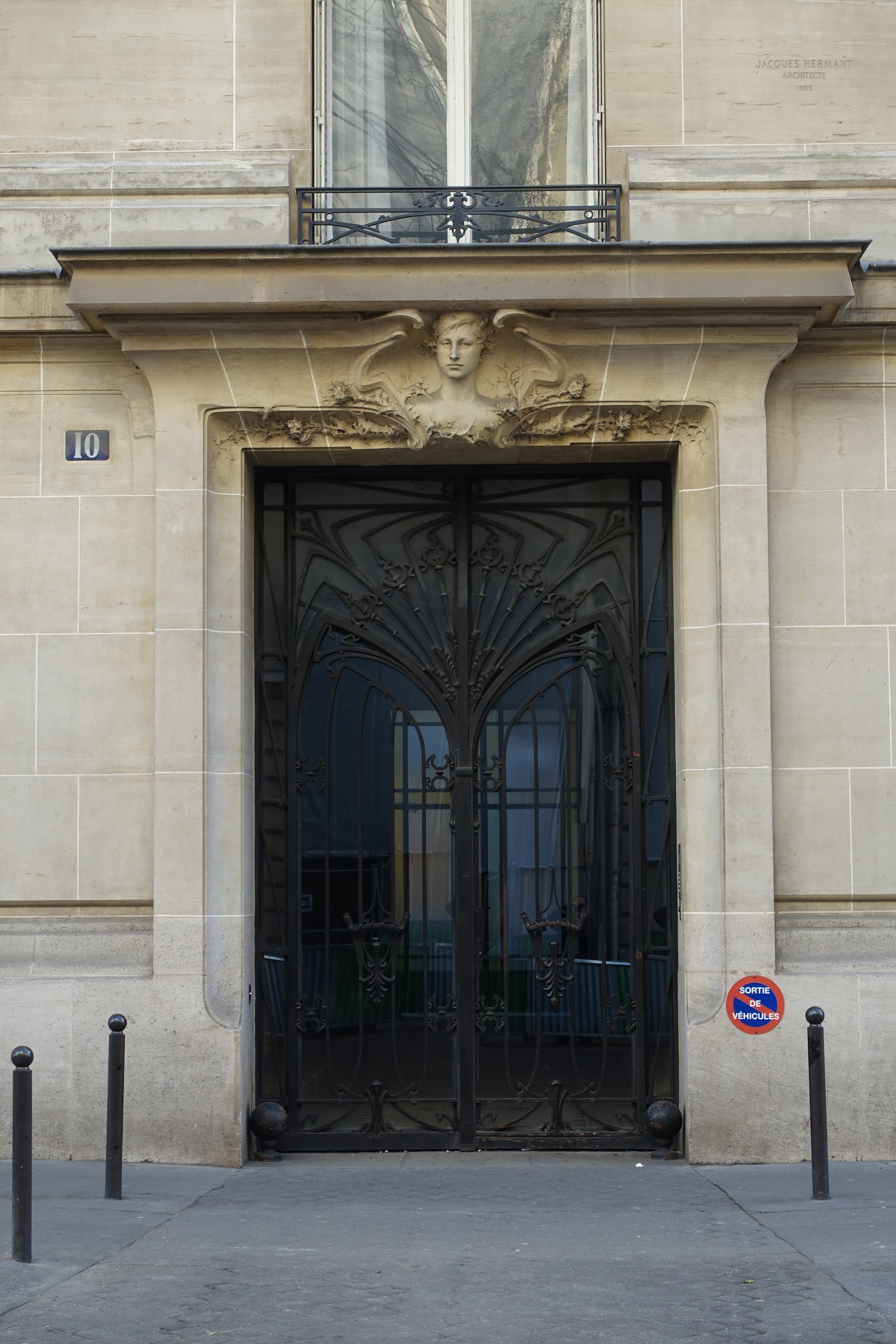
Mix of Art Nouveau and Beaux Arts architecture – Entrance of Rue Georges-Berger no. 10 in Paris, with a structure, proportions and materials used widely in Beaux Arts architecture, by Jacques Hermant (1906)

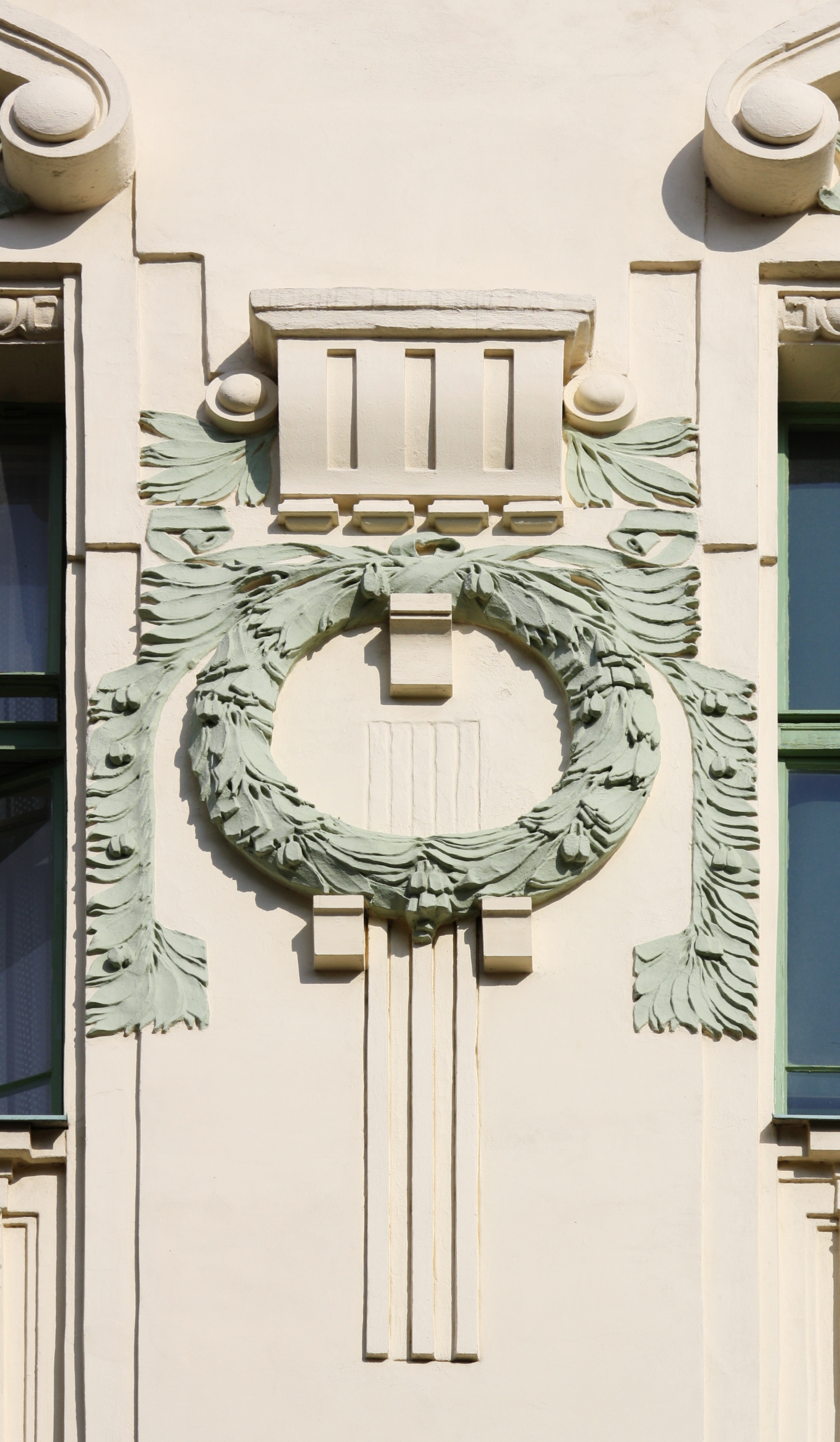
Mix of Art Nouveau and Neoclassicism – Laurel wreath, a motif taken from Greco-Roman antiquity, on a façade of the Czech Technical University (Trojanova no. 11) in Prague, designed by František Schlaffer (1907)

As an art style, Art Nouveau has affinities with the Pre-Raphaelites and the Symbolist styles, and artists like Aubrey Beardsley, Alphonse Mucha, Edward Burne-Jones, Gustav Klimt and Jan Toorop could be classed in more than one of these styles. Unlike Symbolist painting, however, Art Nouveau has a distinctive appearance; and, unlike the artisan-oriented Arts and Crafts movement, Art Nouveau artists readily used new materials, machined surfaces, and abstraction in the service of pure design.

Art Nouveau did not eschew the use of machines, as the Arts and Crafts movement did. For sculpture, the principal materials employed were glass and wrought iron, resulting in sculptural qualities even in architecture. Ceramics were also employed in creating editions of sculptures by artists such as Auguste Rodin. though his sculpture is not considered Art Nouveau.

Art Nouveau architecture made use of many technological innovations of the late 19th century, especially the use of exposed iron and large, irregularly shaped pieces of glass for architecture.

Art Nouveau tendencies were also absorbed into local styles. In Denmark, for example, it was one aspect of Skønvirke ('Aesthetic work'), which itself more closely relates to the Arts and Crafts style. Likewise, artists adopted many of the floral and organic motifs of Art Nouveau into the Młoda Polska ('Young Poland') style in Poland. Młoda Polska, however, was also inclusive of other artistic styles and encompassed a broader approach to art, literature, and lifestyle.

Architecturally, Art Nouveau has affinities with styles that, although modern, exist outside the modernist tradition established by architects like Walter Gropius and Le Corbusier. It is particularly closely related to Expressionist architecture, which shares its preference for organic shapes, but grew out of an intellectual dissatisfaction with Art Nouveau's approach to ornamentation. As opposed to Art Nouveau's focus on plants and vegetal motifs, Expressionism takes inspiration from things like caves, mountains, lightning, crystal, and rock formations. Another style conceived as a reaction to Art Nouveau was Art Deco, which rejected organic surfaces altogether in preference for a rectilinear style derived from the contemporary artistic avant-garde.

== Genres ==
Art Nouveau is represented in painting and sculpture, but it is most prominent in architecture and the decorative arts. It was well-suited to the graphic arts, especially the poster, interior design, metal and glass art, jewellery, furniture design, ceramics and textiles.

=== Posters and graphic art ===
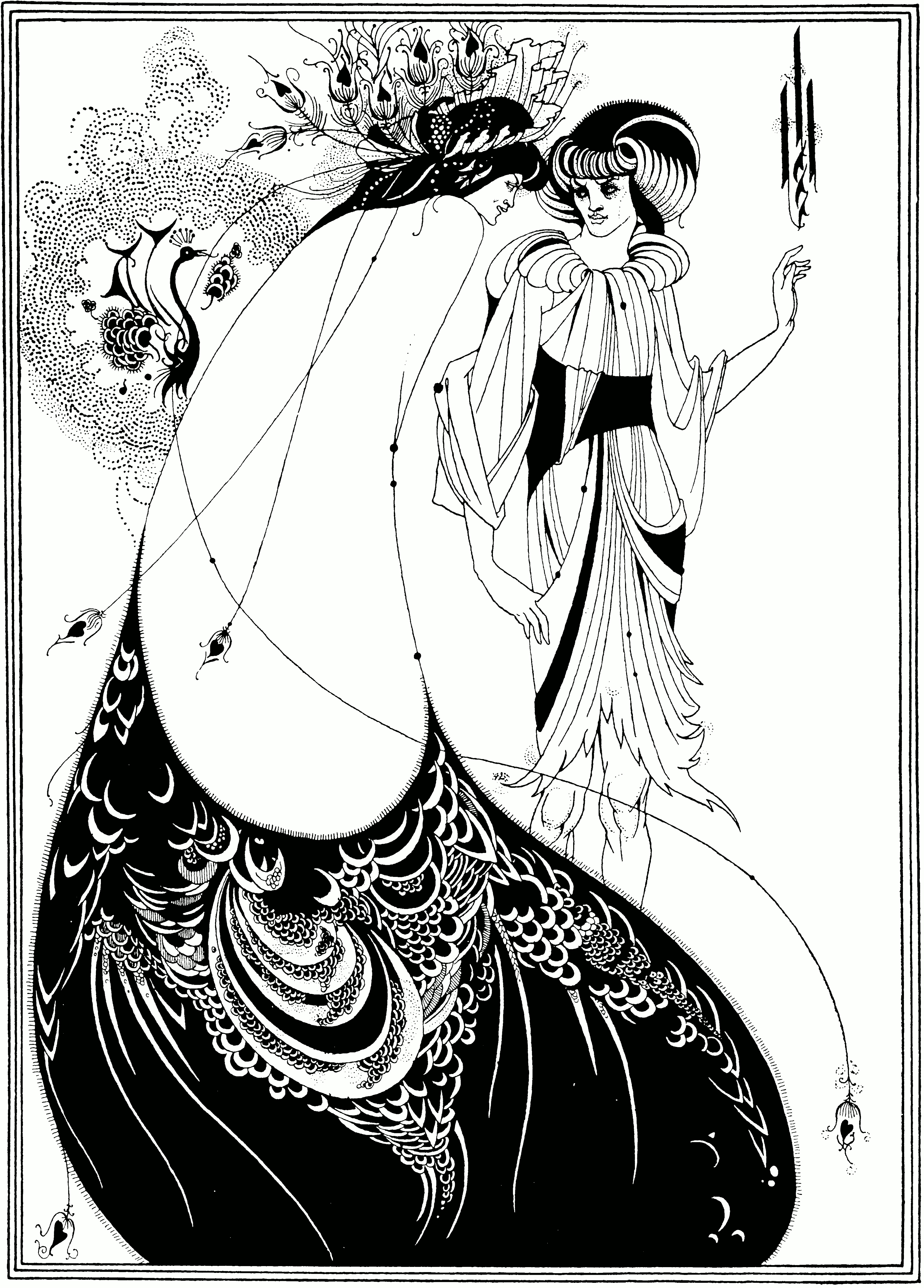
The Peacock Skirt, by Aubrey Beardsley (1892)

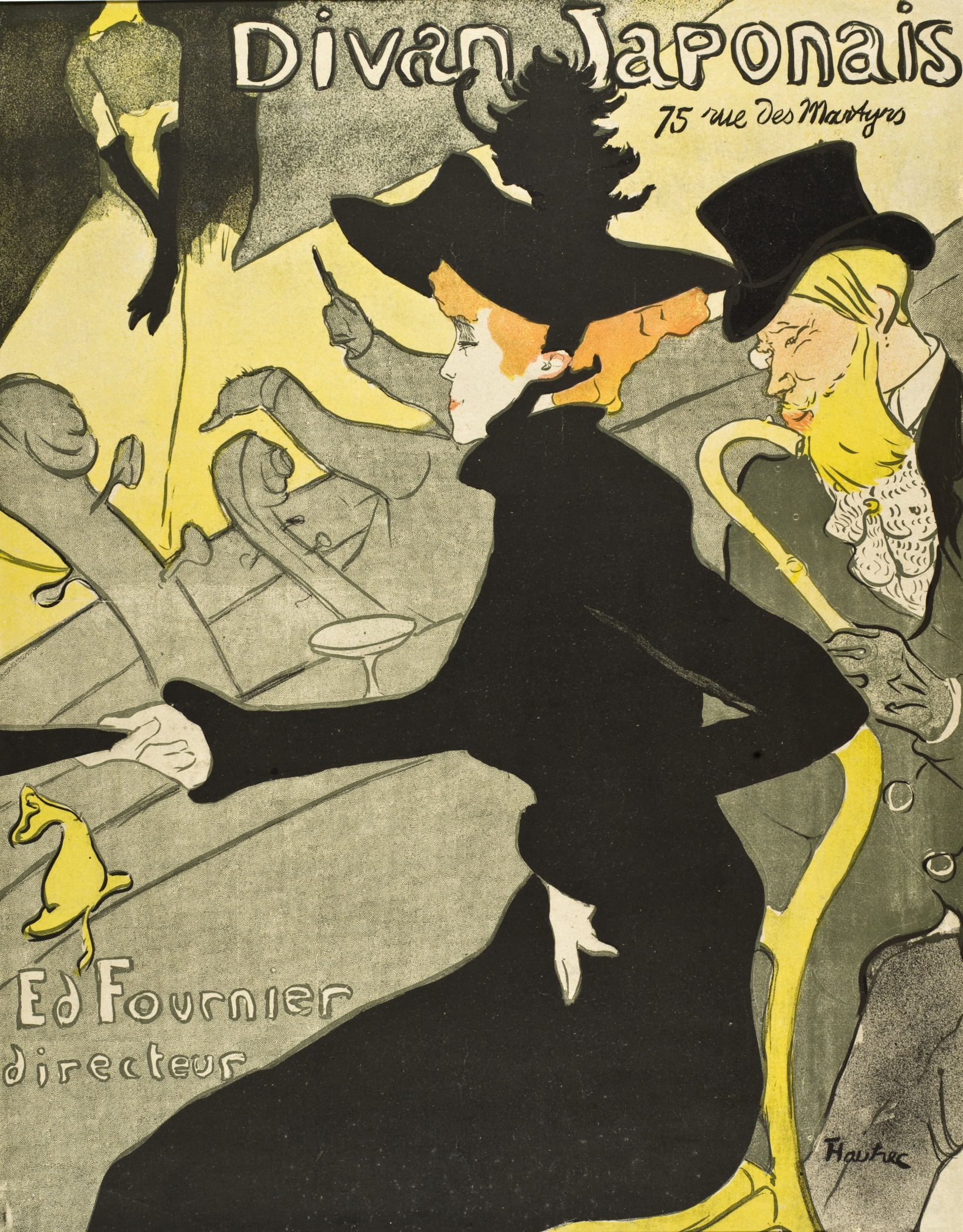
Divan Japonais lithograph by Henri de Toulouse-Lautrec (1892–93)

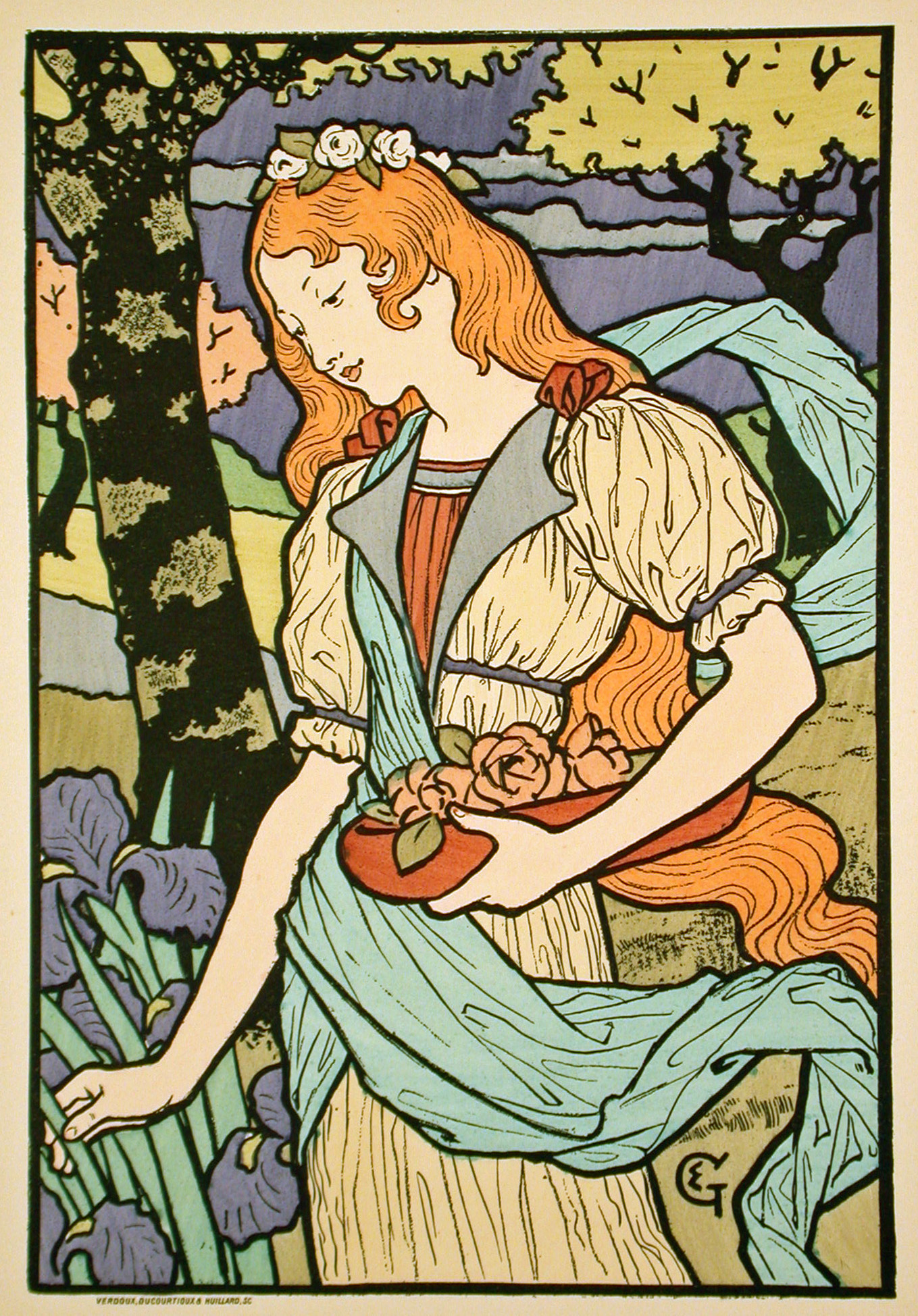
Poster for Grafton Galleries by Eugène Grasset (1893)

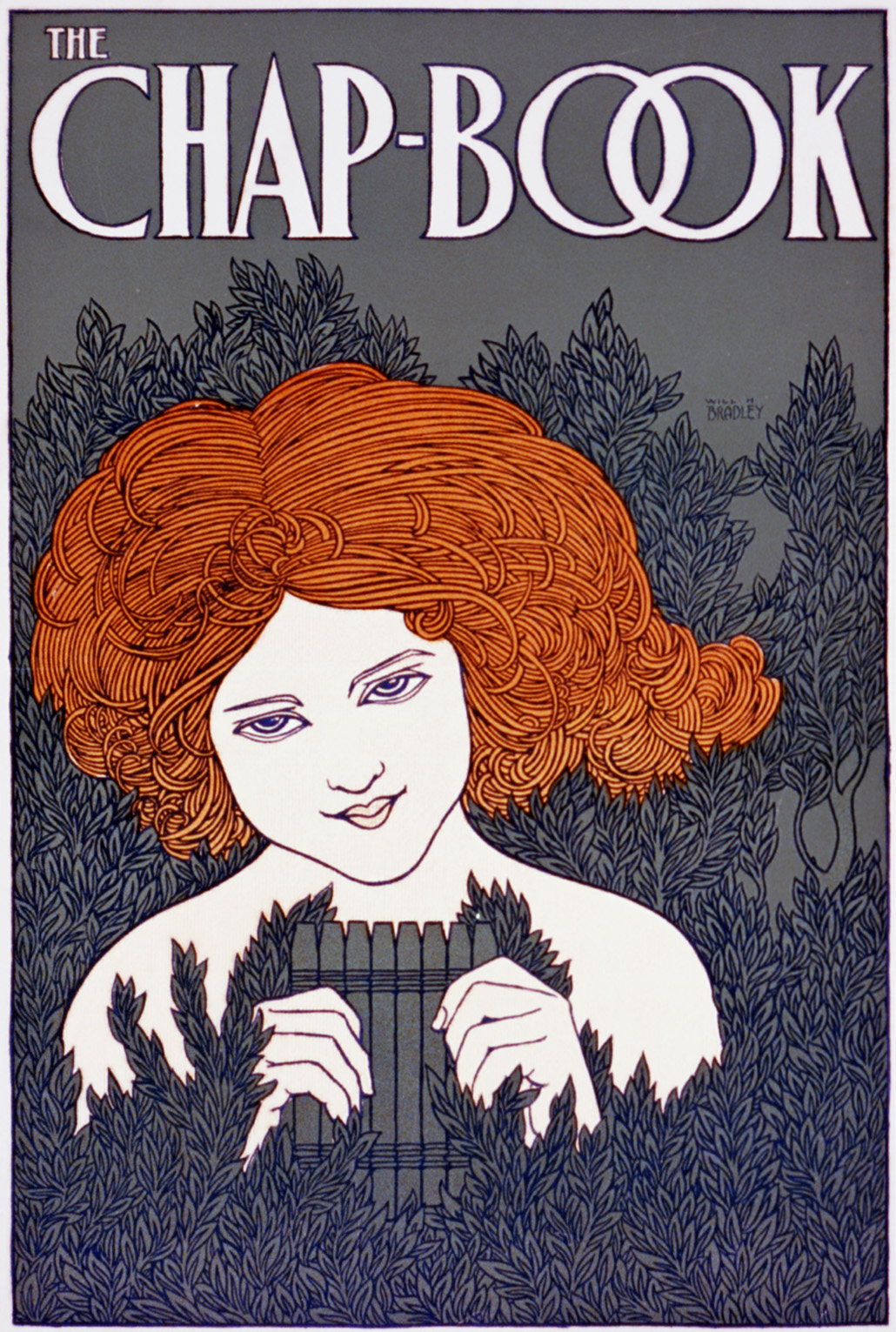
Poster for The Chap-Book by Will H. Bradley (1895)

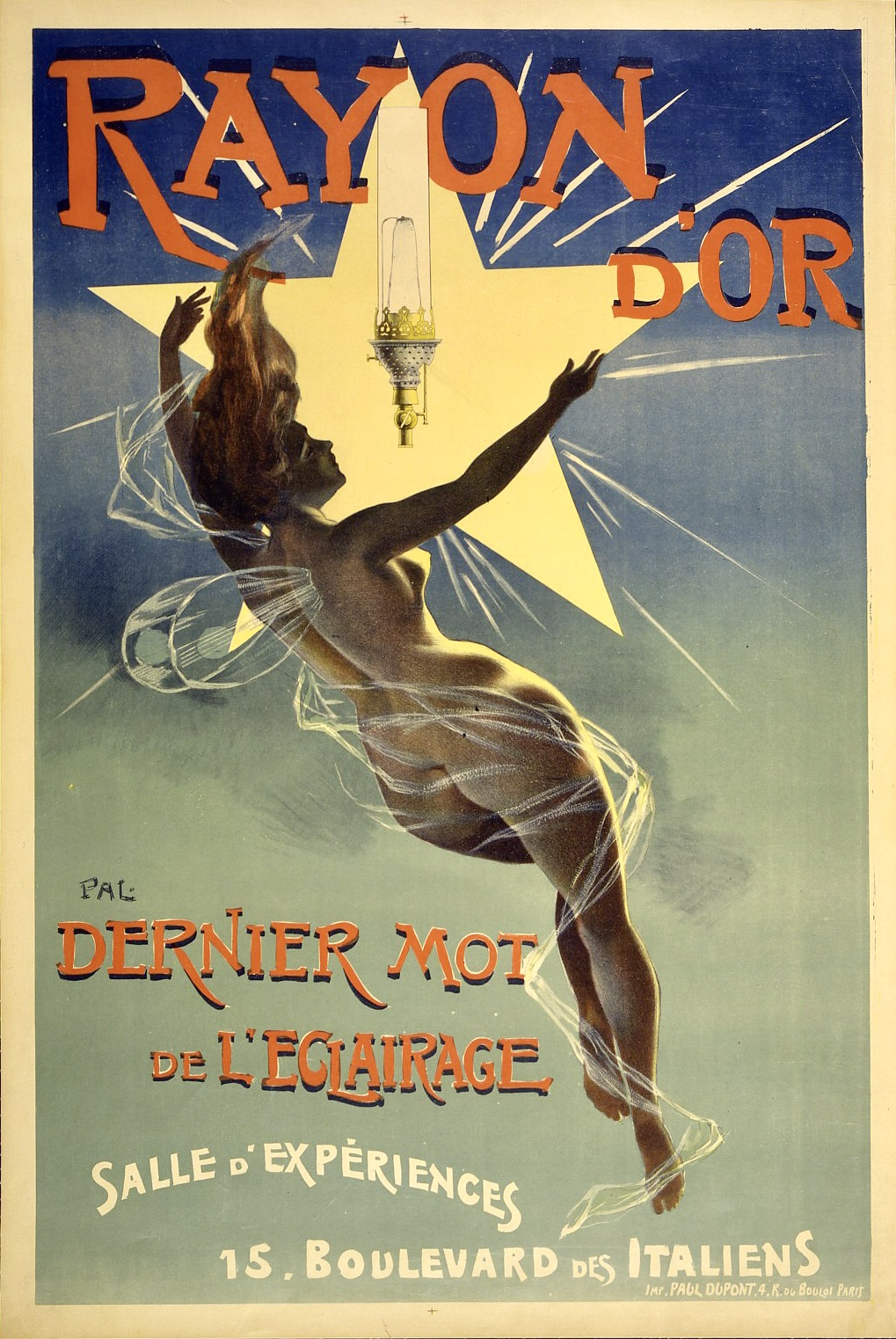
Poster for Rayon d'Or by Jean de Paléologue ("Pal") (1895)

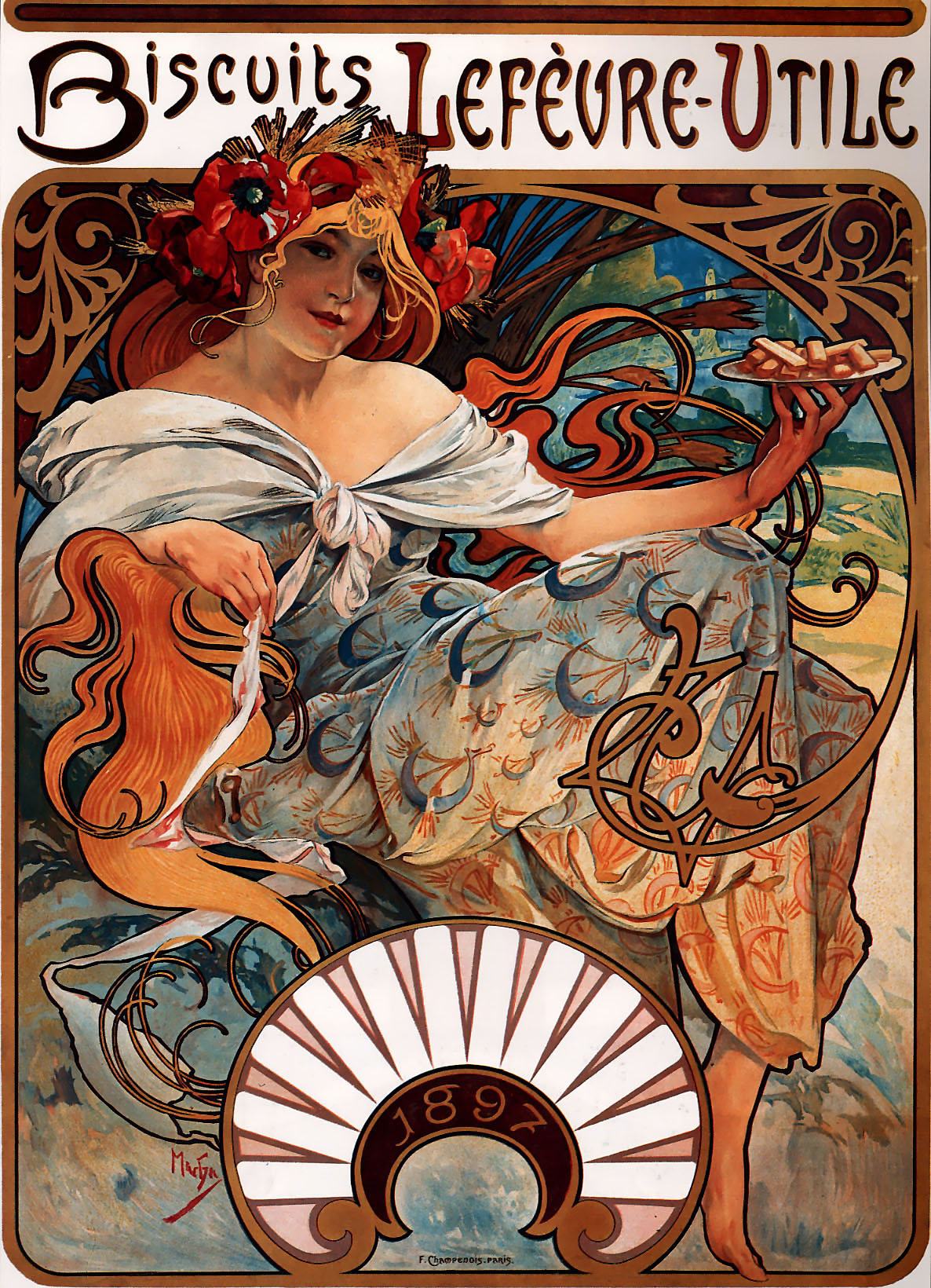
Biscuits Lefèvre-Utile by Alphonse Mucha (1896)

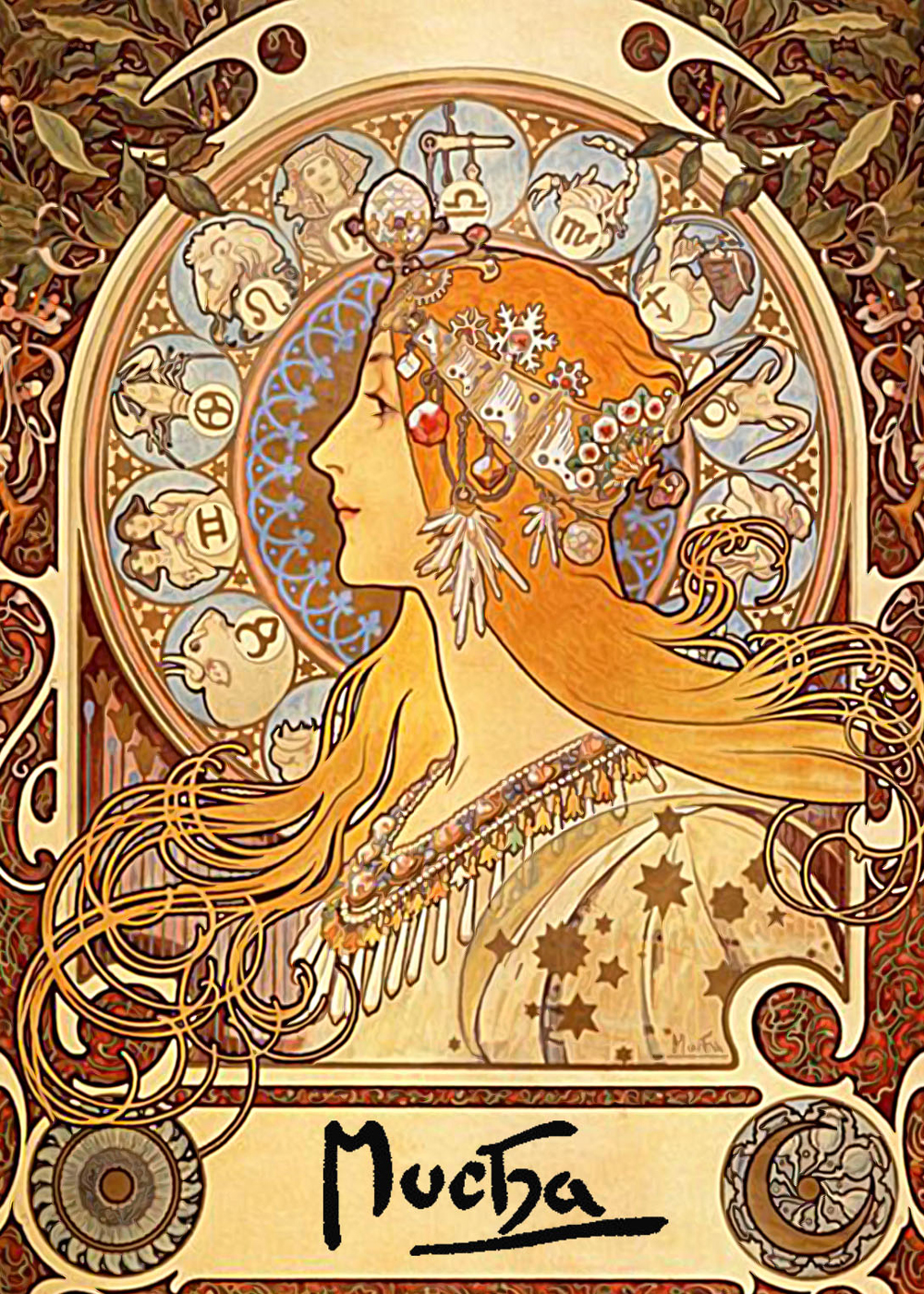
Zodiac Calendar by Mucha (1896)

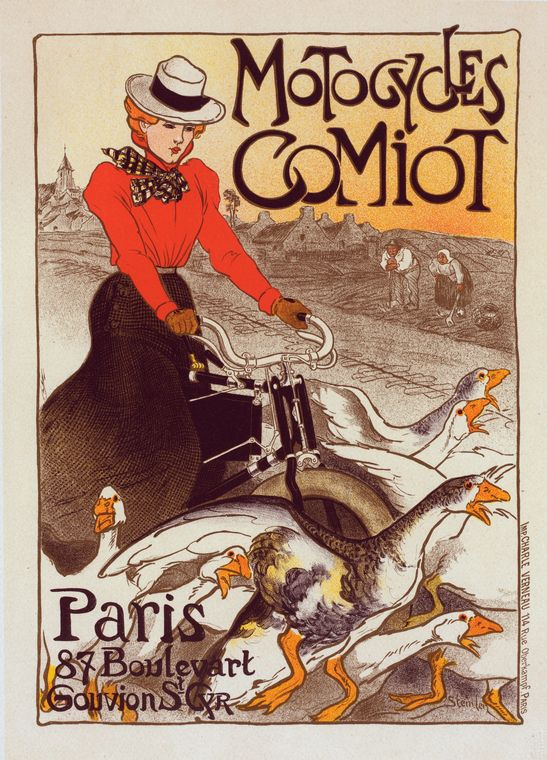
Motocycles Comiot by Théophile-Alexandre Steinlen from Les Maîtres de l'affiche (1899)

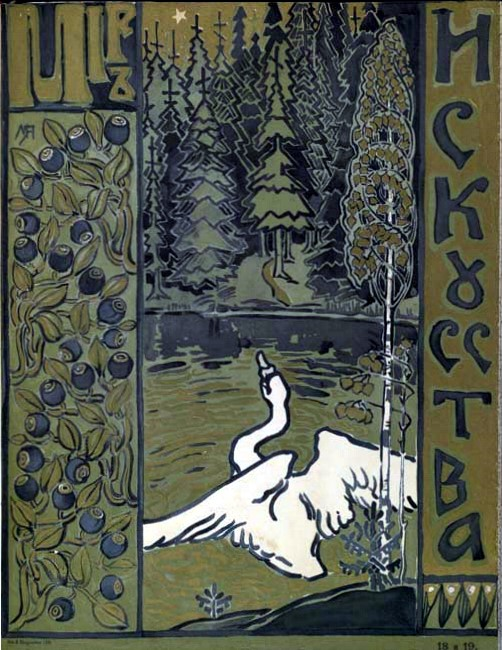
Mir iskusstva cover by Maria Yakunchikova (1899)

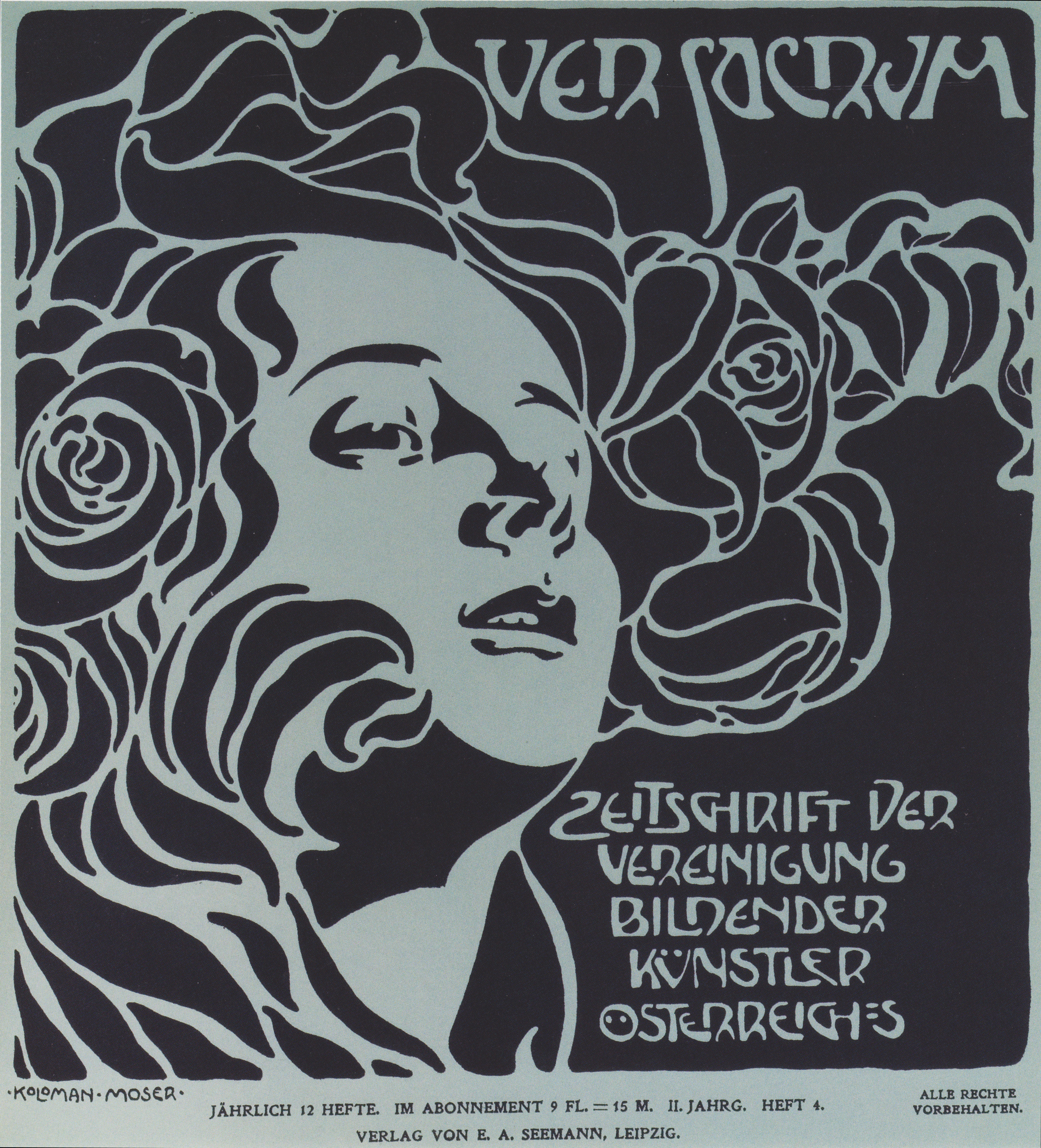
Ver Sacrum illustration by Koloman Moser (1899)

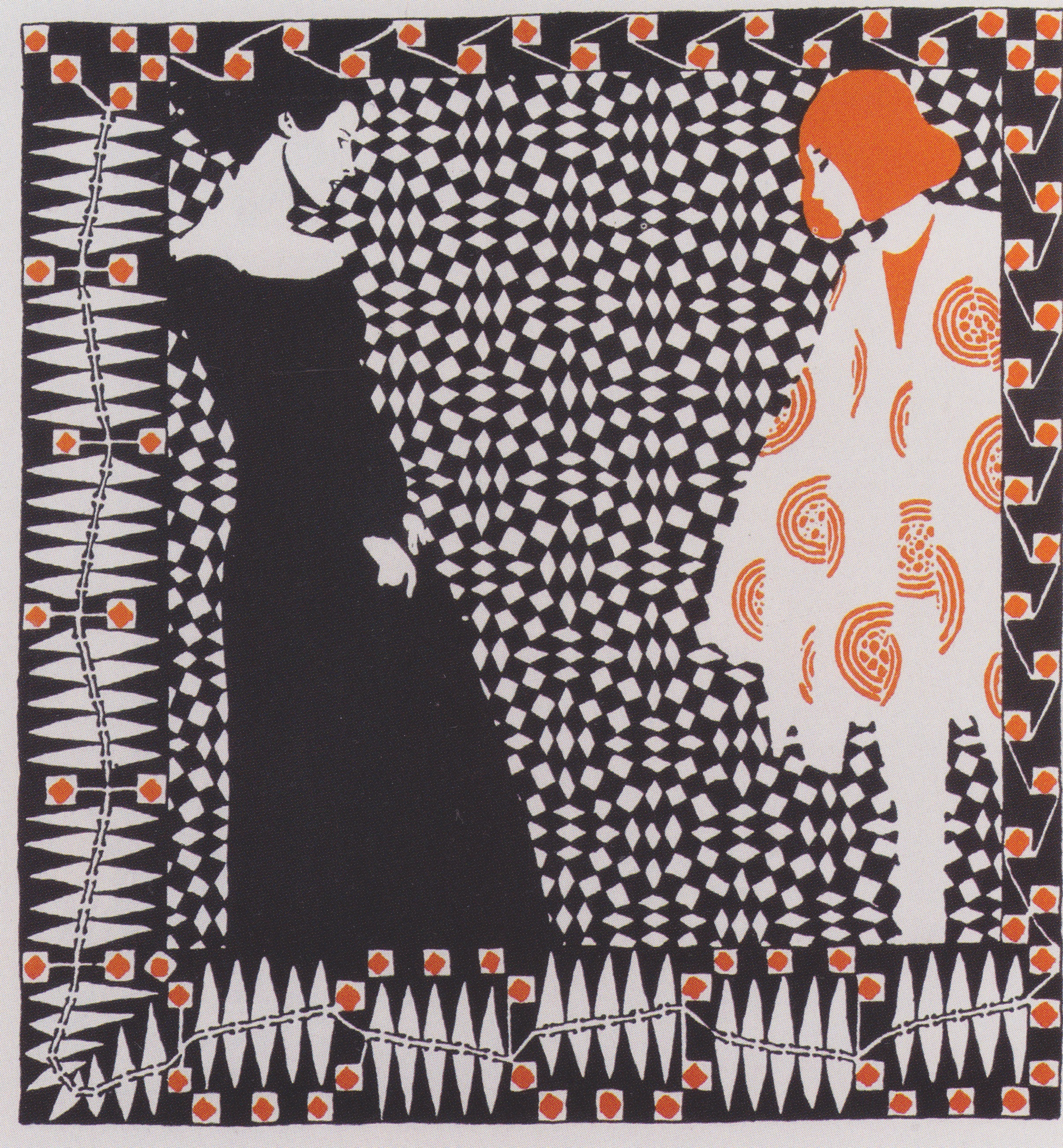
Illustration from Ver Sacrum by Moser (1900)

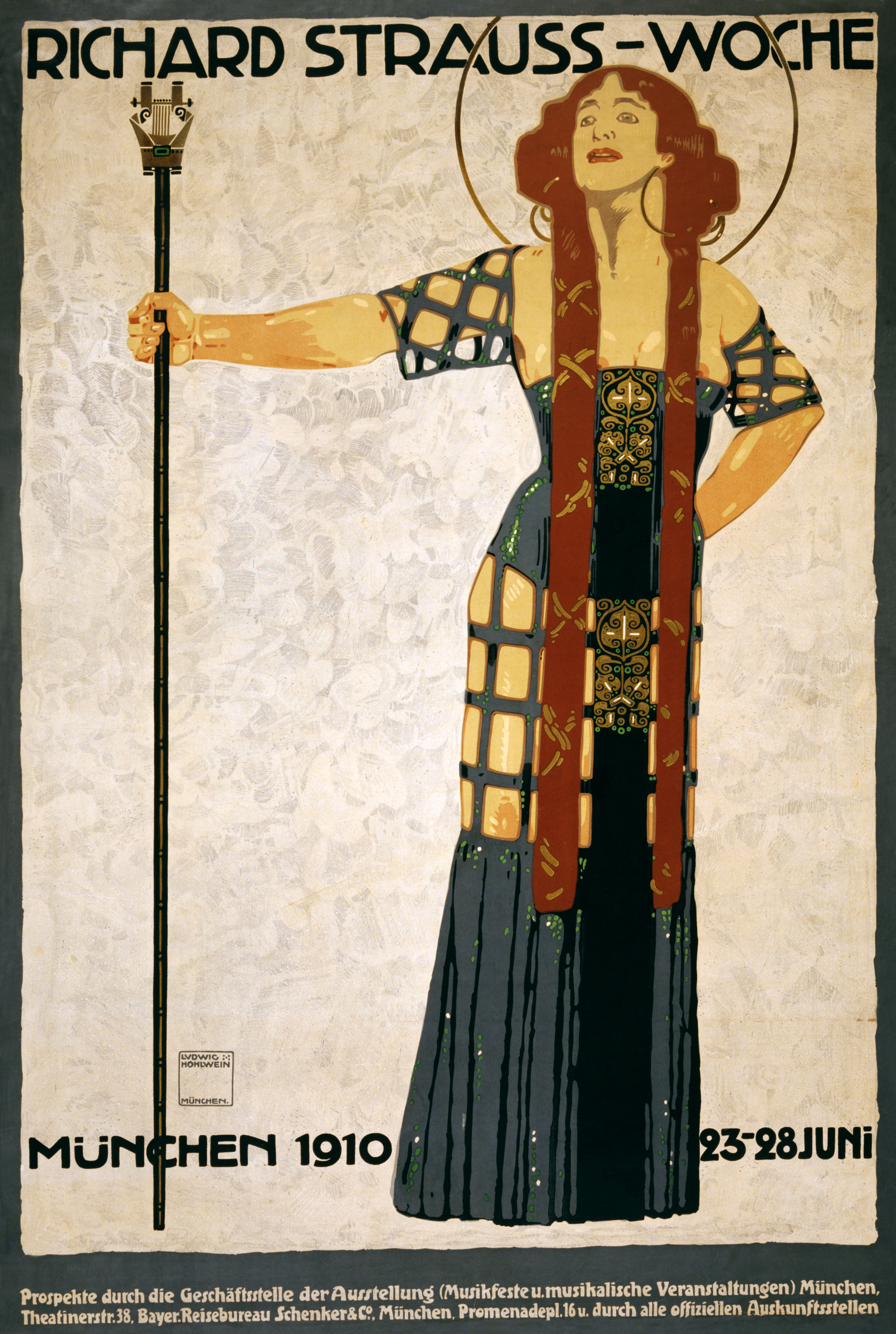
Festival poster by Ludwig Hohlwein (1910)

The graphic arts flourished in the Art Nouveau period, thanks to new technologies of printing, particularly colour lithography, which allowed the mass production of colour posters. Art was no longer confined to galleries, museums and salons; it could be found on Paris walls, and in illustrated art magazines, which circulated throughout Europe and to the United States. The most popular theme of Art Nouveau posters was women; women symbolizing glamour, modernity and beauty, often surrounded by flowers.

In Britain, the leading graphic artist in the Art Nouveau style was Aubrey Beardsley (1872–1898). He began with engraved book illustrations for Le Morte d'Arthur, then black and white illustrations for Salome by Oscar Wilde (1893), which brought him fame. In the same year, he began engraving illustrations and posters for the art magazine The Studio, which helped publicize European artists such as Fernand Khnopff in Britain. The curving lines and intricate floral patterns attracted as much attention as the text.

The Swiss-French artist Eugène Grasset (1845–1917) was one of the first creators of French Art Nouveau posters. He helped decorate the cabaret Le Chat noir in 1885 and made his first posters for the Fêtes de Paris. He made a celebrated poster of Sarah Bernhardt in 1890, and a wide variety of book illustrations. The artist-designers Jules Chéret, Georges de Feure and the painter Henri de Toulouse-Lautrec all made posters for Paris theaters, cafés, dance halls cabarets. The Czech artist Alphonse Mucha (1860–1939) arrived in Paris in 1888, and in 1895 made a poster for actress Sarah Bernhardt in the play Gismonda by Victorien Sardou. The success of this poster led to a contract to produce posters for six more plays by Bernhardt. Over the next four years, he also designed sets, costumes, and even jewellery for the actress. Based on the success of his theater posters, Mucha made posters for a variety of products, ranging from cigarettes and soap to beer biscuits, all featuring an idealized female figure with an hourglass figure. He went on to design products, from jewellery to biscuit boxes, in his distinctive style.

In Vienna, the most prolific designer of graphics and posters was Koloman Moser (1868–1918), who actively participated in the Secession movement with Gustav Klimt and Josef Hoffmann, and made illustrations and covers for the magazine of the movement, Ver Sacrum, as well as paintings, furniture and decoration.

=== Painting ===
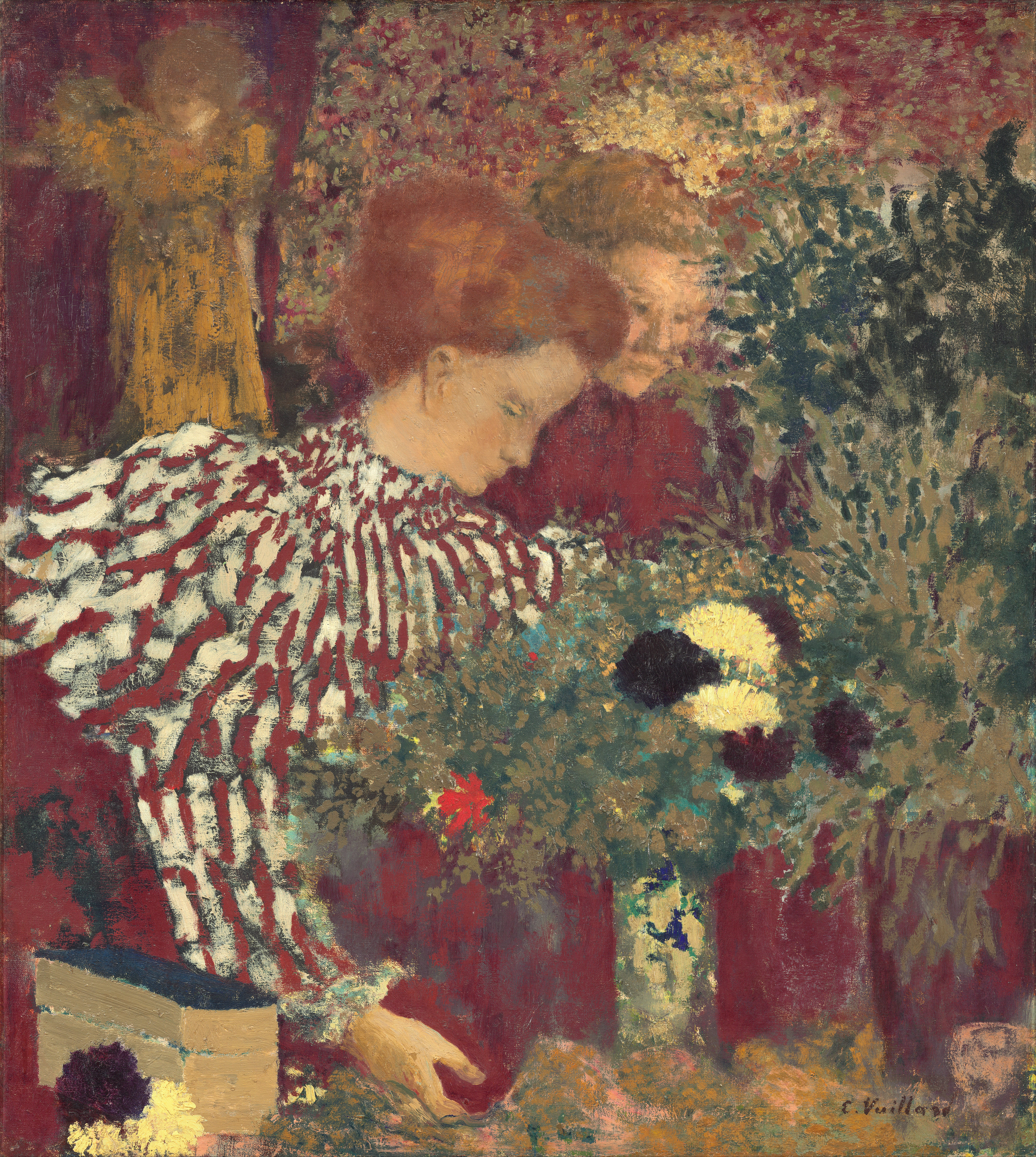
Le Corsage rayé by Édouard Vuillard (1895), National Gallery of Art

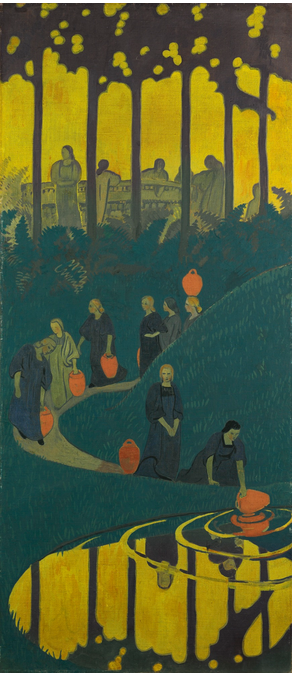
Women at the Spring by Paul Sérusier (1898), Musée d'Orsay

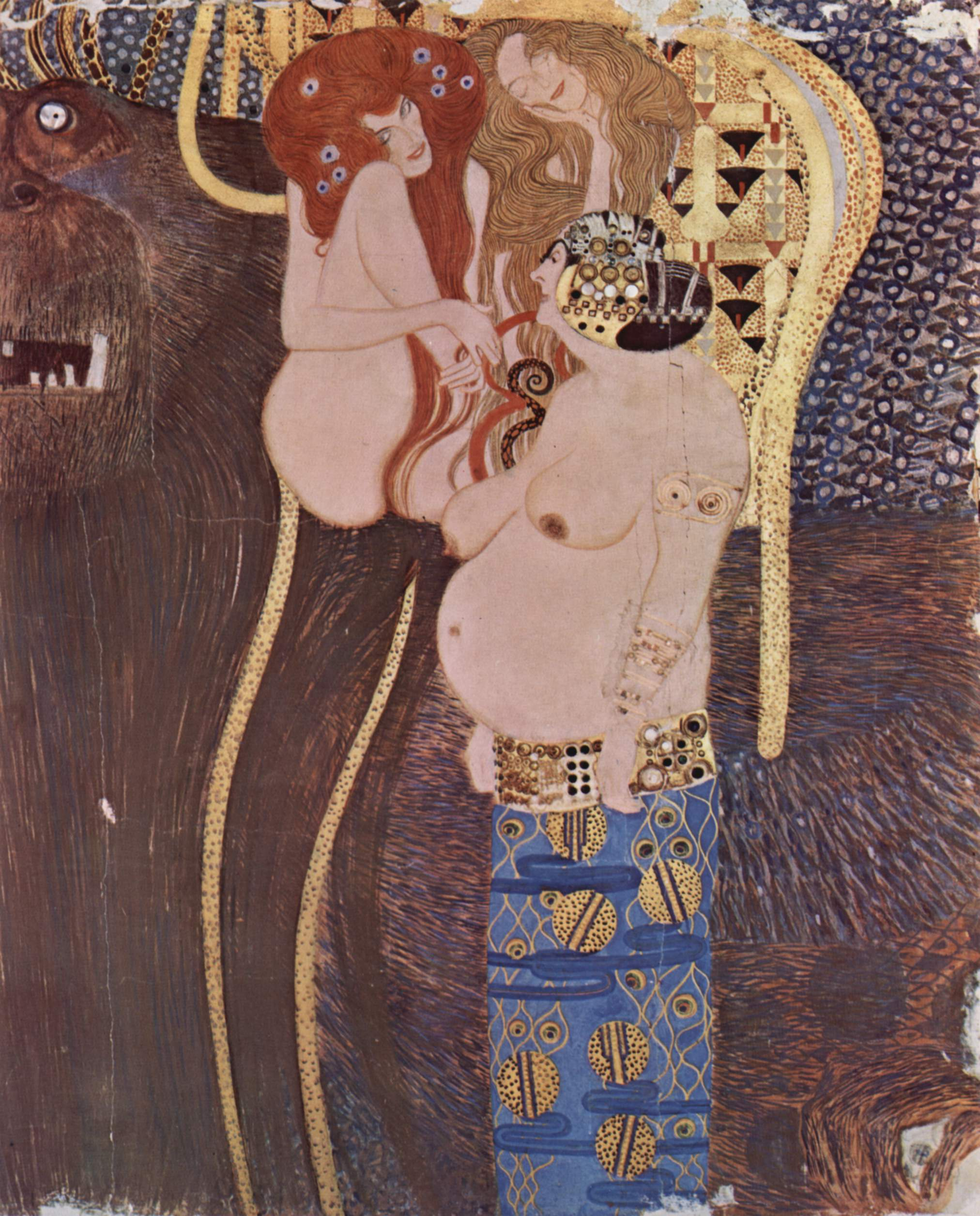
Beethoven Frieze in the Sezessionshaus in Vienna by Gustav Klimt (1902)

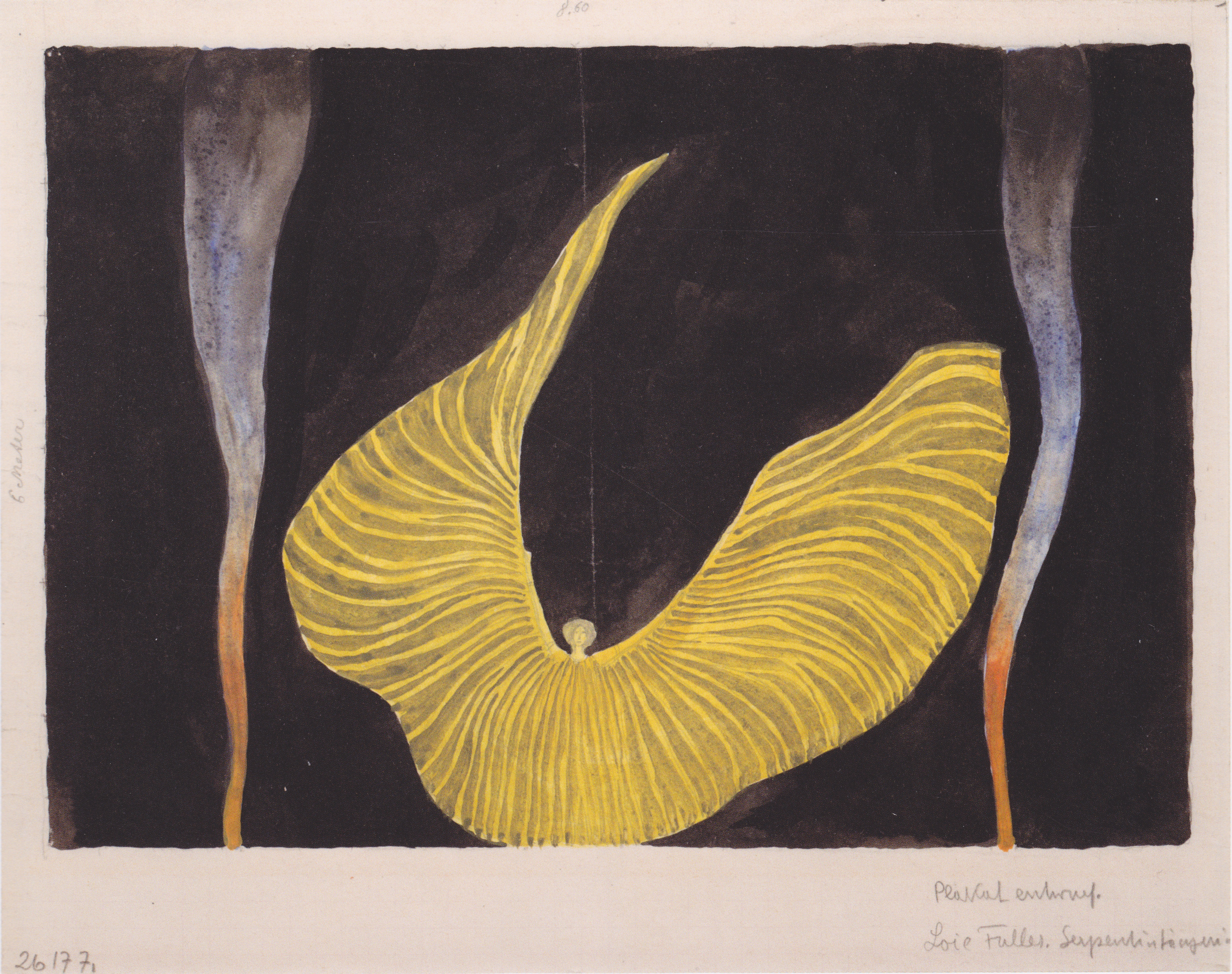
Watercolour and ink painting of Loïe Fuller dancing, by Koloman Moser (1902)

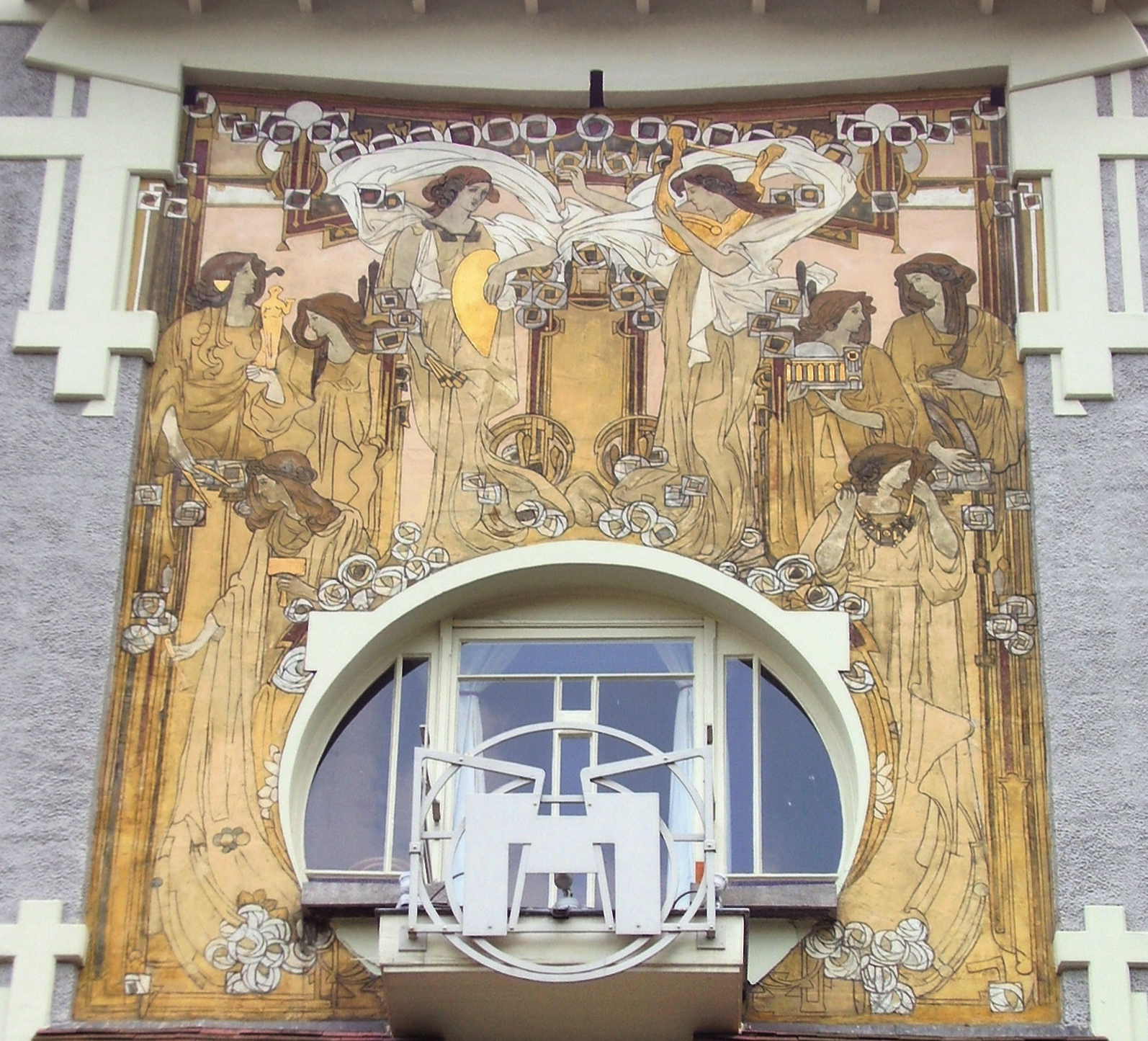
Sgraffito by Paul Cauchie on his residence and studio, Brussels (1905)

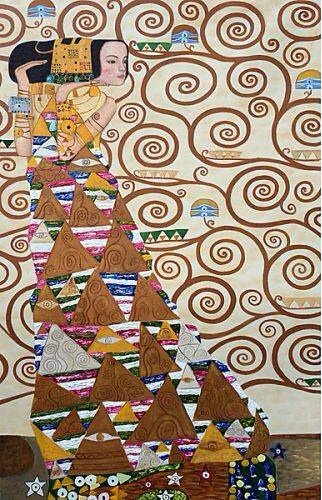
Detail of the frieze by Klimt in the Stoclet Palace, Brussels (1905–1911)

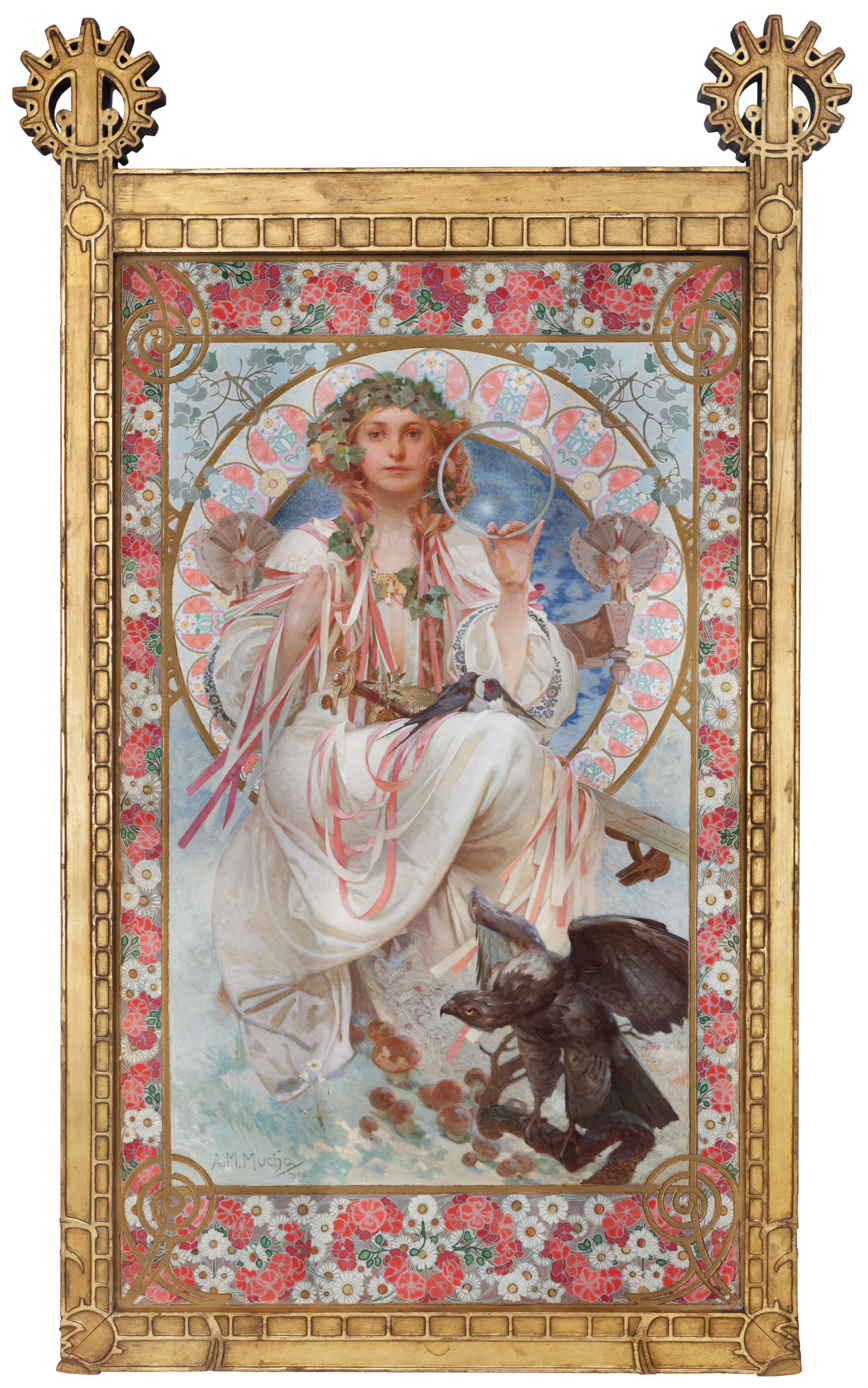
Slavia by Alphonse Mucha (1908)

Painting was another domain of Art Nouveau, though most painters associated with Art Nouveau are primarily described as members of other movements, particularly Post-Impressionism and symbolism. Alphonse Mucha was famous for his Art Nouveau posters, which frustrated him. According to his son and biographer, Jiří Mucha, he did not think much of Art Nouveau. "What is it, Art Nouveau? he asked. "... Art can never be new." He took the greatest pride in his work as a history painter. His Art Nouveau-inspired painting Slava is a portrait of the daughter of his patron in Slavic costume, which was modelled after his theatrical posters.

The painters most closely associated with Art Nouveau were Les Nabis, post-impressionist artists who were active in Paris from 1888 until 1900. One of their stated goals was to break down the barrier between the fine arts and the decorative arts. They painted not only canvases, but also decorative screens and panels. Many of their works were influenced by the aesthetics of Japanese prints. The members included Pierre Bonnard, Maurice Denis, Paul Ranson, Édouard Vuillard, Ker-Xavier Roussel, Félix Vallotton, and Paul Sérusier.

The Austrian painter Gustav Klimt was an exponent of Art Nouveau painting, and more specifically a representative of the Modernist movement of the Viennese Secession. Klimt painted canvases and murals in an ornate personal style, which he also expressed through handicrafts, such as those found in the Viennese Secession Gallery. Klimt found one of his most recurring sources of inspiration in the female nude. His works are sensual, with a naturalistic, individual, organic style, inspired by nature following the decorative style of Gaudí.

The Catalan modernist painters (Ramón Casas, Santiago Rusiñol, Aleix Clapés, Joaquim Sunyer, Hermenegildo Anglada Camarasa, Juan Brull, Ricard Canals, Javier Gosé, Josep Maria Sert, Miguel Utrillo, etc.), closely connected with the avant-garde in Paris, and hugely influenced by Antoni Gaudí, had in the Els Quatre Gats tavern their meeting place. Pablo Picasso came out of the group.

Disciples of Anglada Camarasa were the Argentines Gregorio López Naguil, Tito Cittadini and Raúl Mazza who were responsible for carrying art nouveau painting to South America

In Belgium, Fernand Khnopff worked in both painting and graphic design. Wall murals by Gustav Klimt were integrated into decorative scheme of Josef Hoffmann for the Stoclet Palace (1905–1911). The Klimt mural for the dining room at the Stoclet Palace is considered a masterpiece of late Art Nouveau.

One subject did appear both in traditional painting and Art Nouveau; the American dancer Loie Fuller, was portrayed by French and Austrian painters and poster artists.

One particular style that became popular in the Art Nouveau period, especially in Brussels, was sgraffito, a technique invented in the Renaissance of applying layers of tinted plaster to make murals on the façades of houses. This was used in particular by Belgian architect Paul Hankar for the houses he built for two artist friends, Paul Cauchie and Albert Ciamberlani.

=== Glass art ===
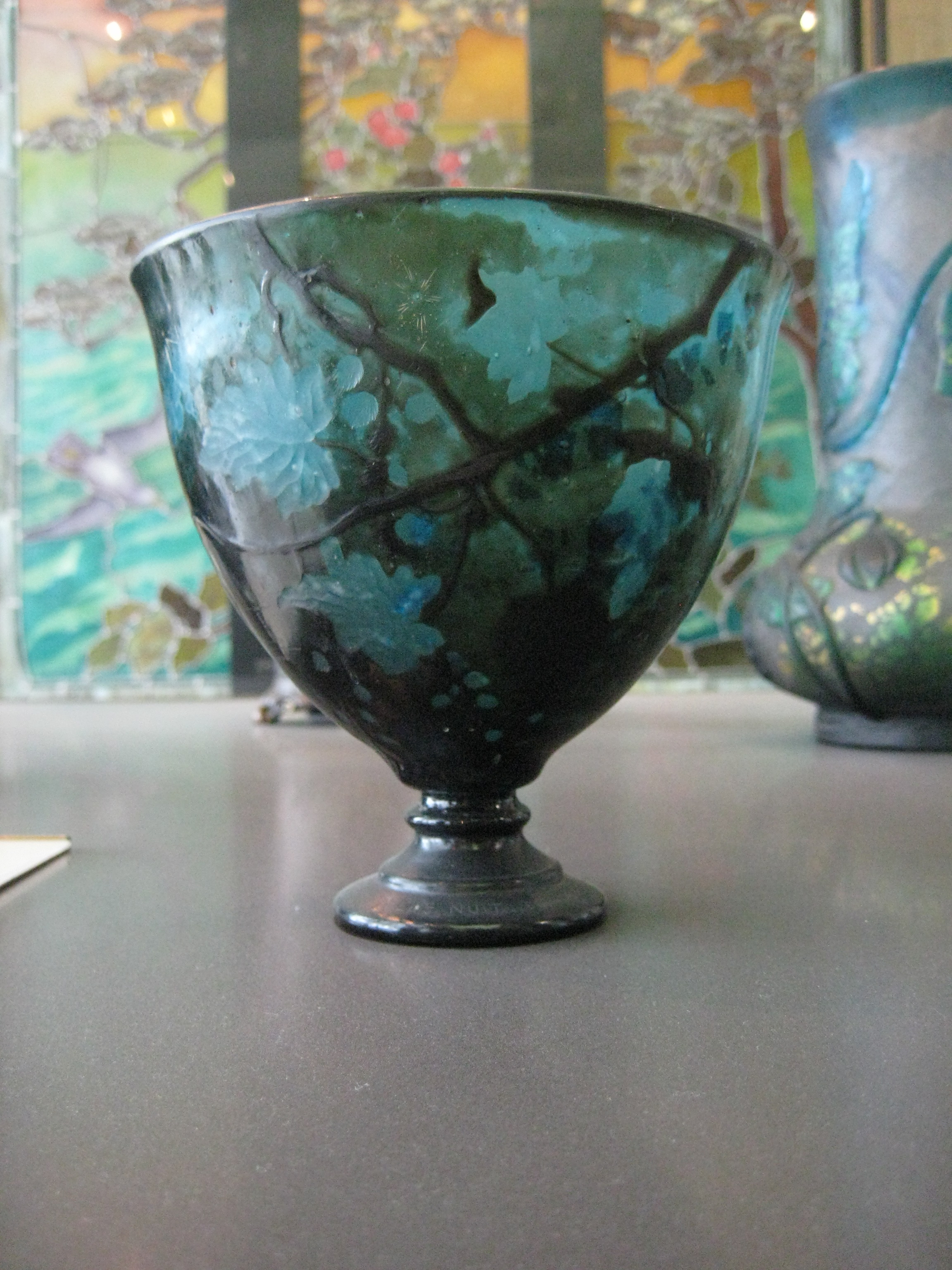
Par une telle nuit cup by Émile Gallé (1894)

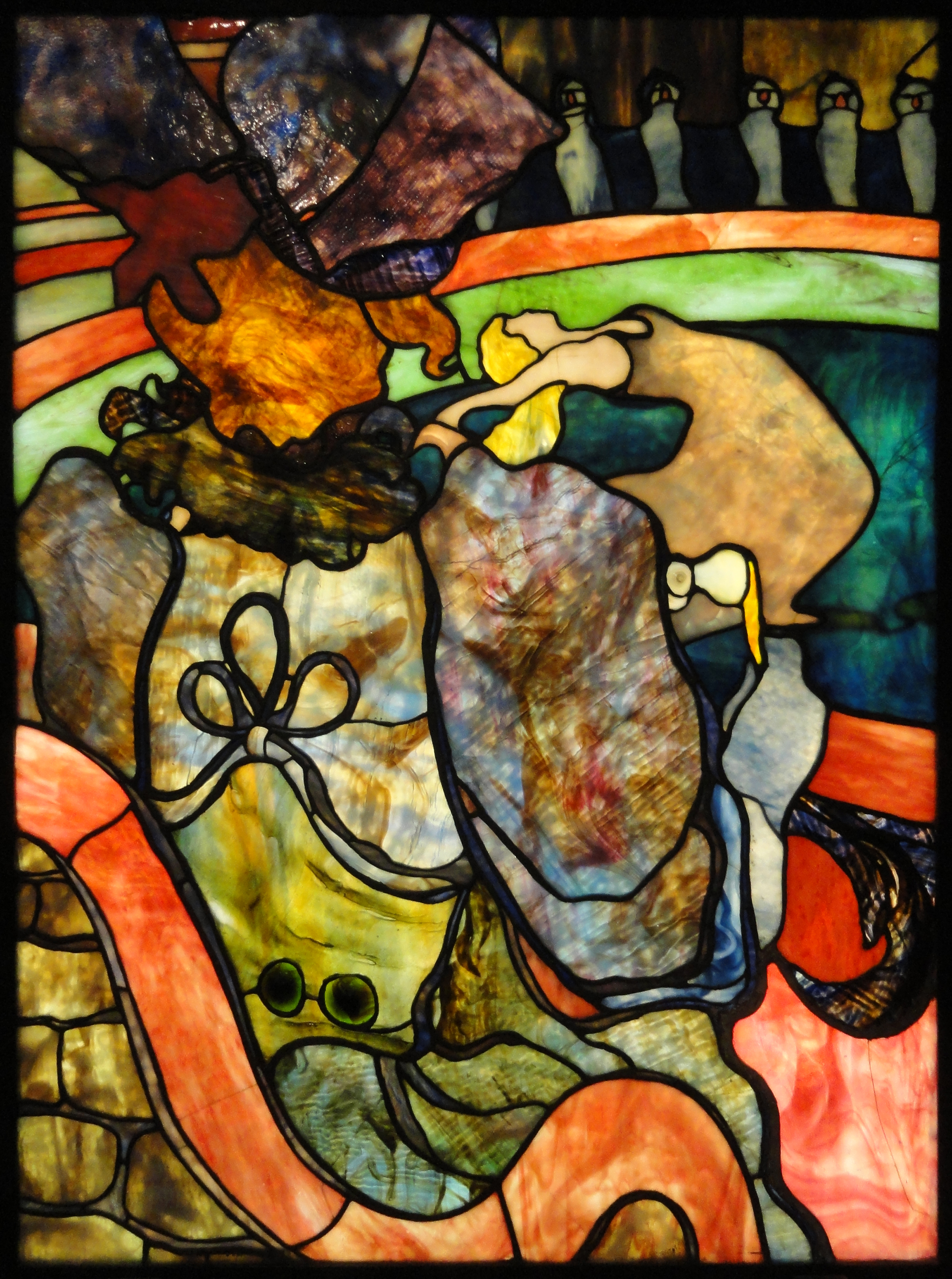
Au Nouveau Cirque, Papa Chrysanthème by Henri de Toulouse-Lautrec and Louis Comfort Tiffany (c. 1894), stained glass, Musée d'Orsay, Paris

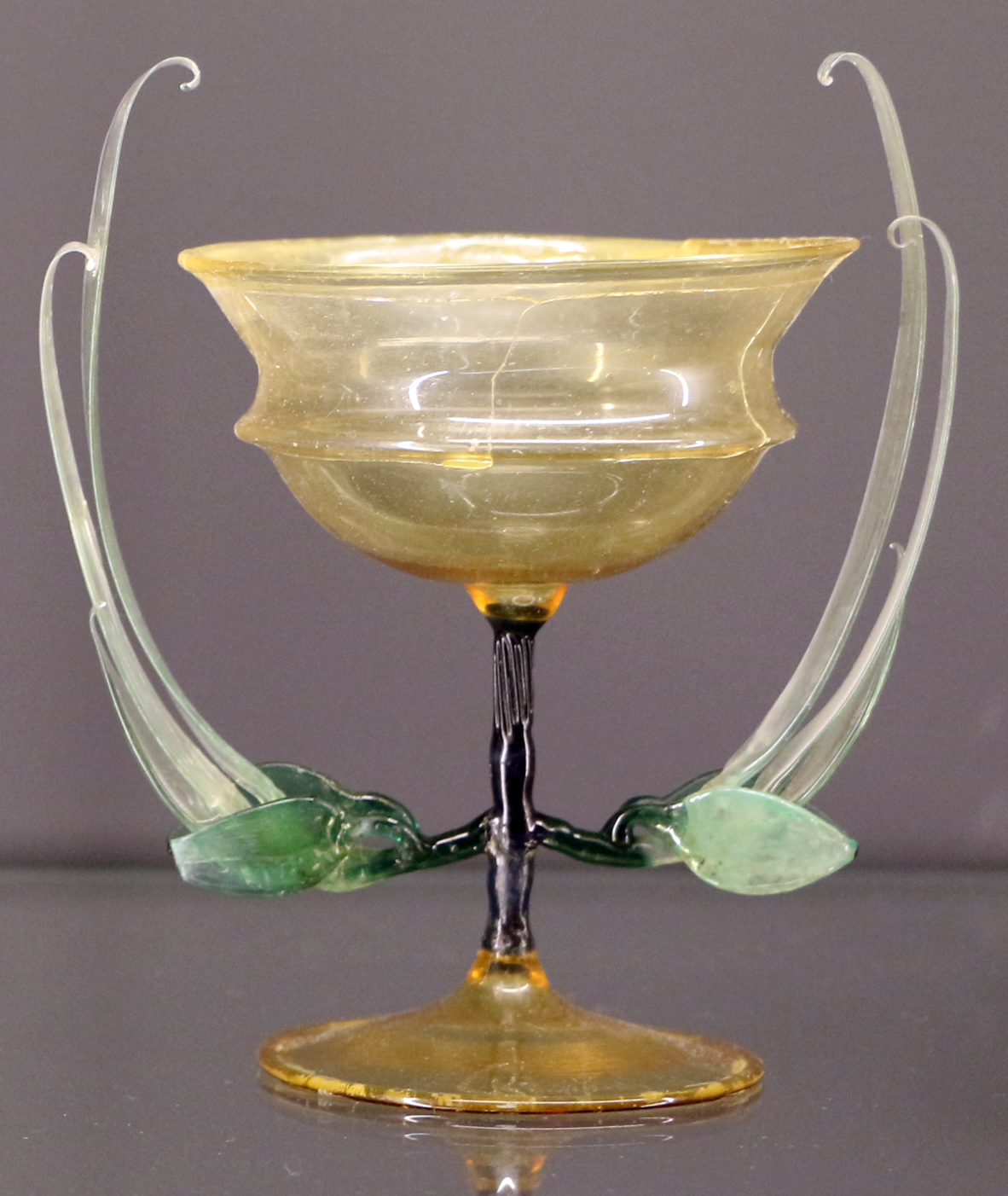
Blown glass with flower design by Karl Koepping (1896)

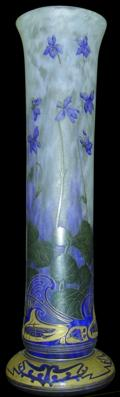
Daum vase (1900)

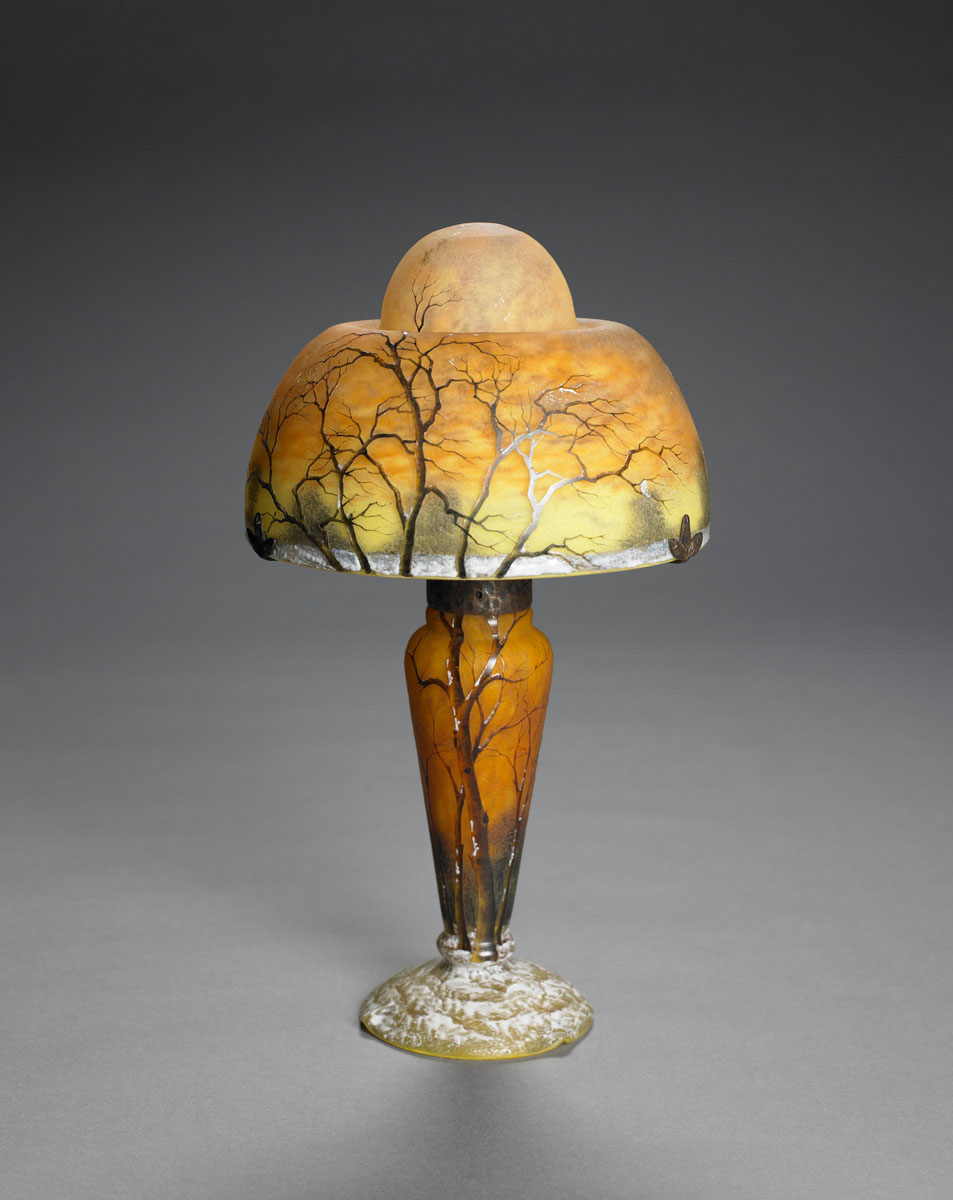
Daum lamp (1900)

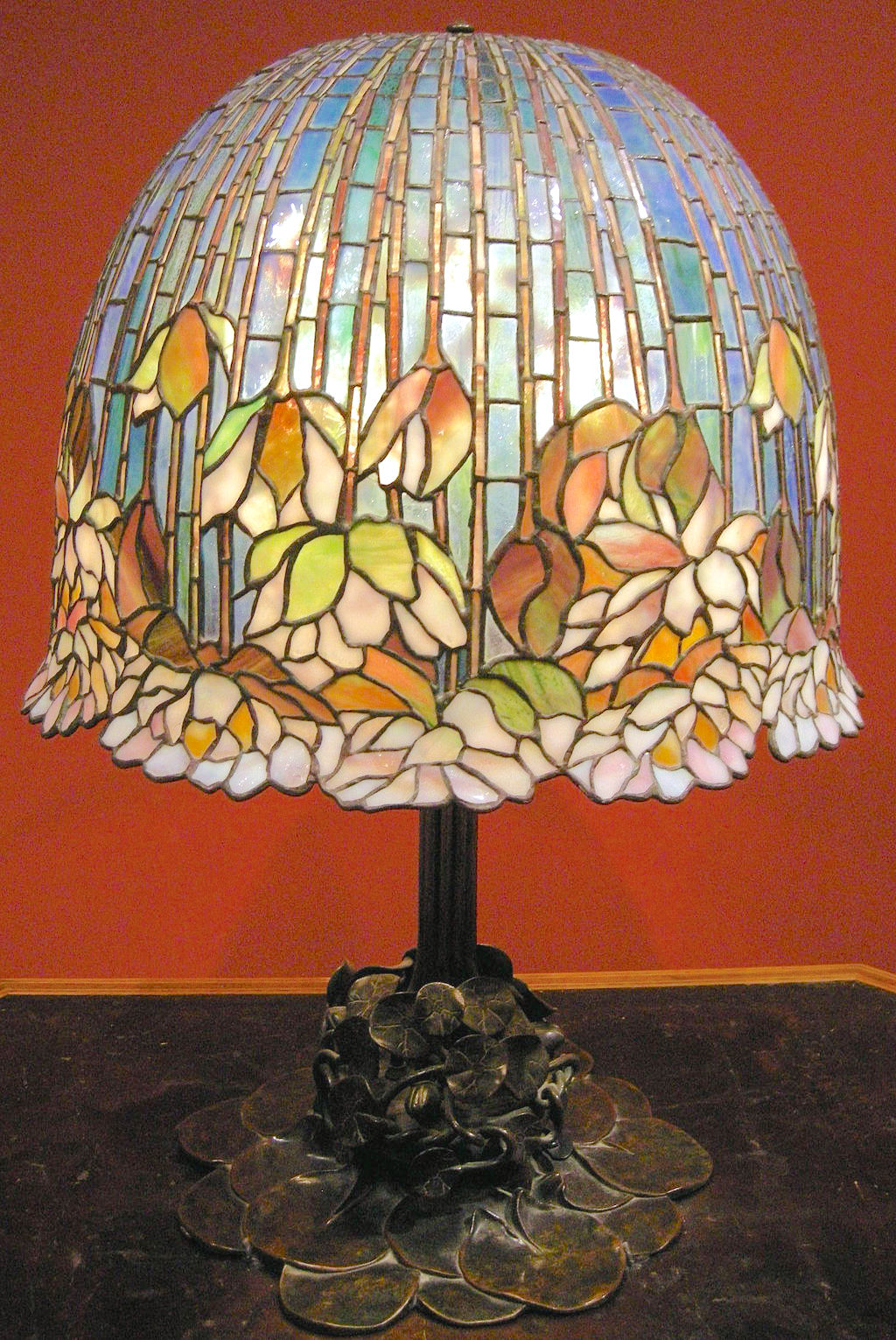
Lily lamp by Tiffany (1900–1910)

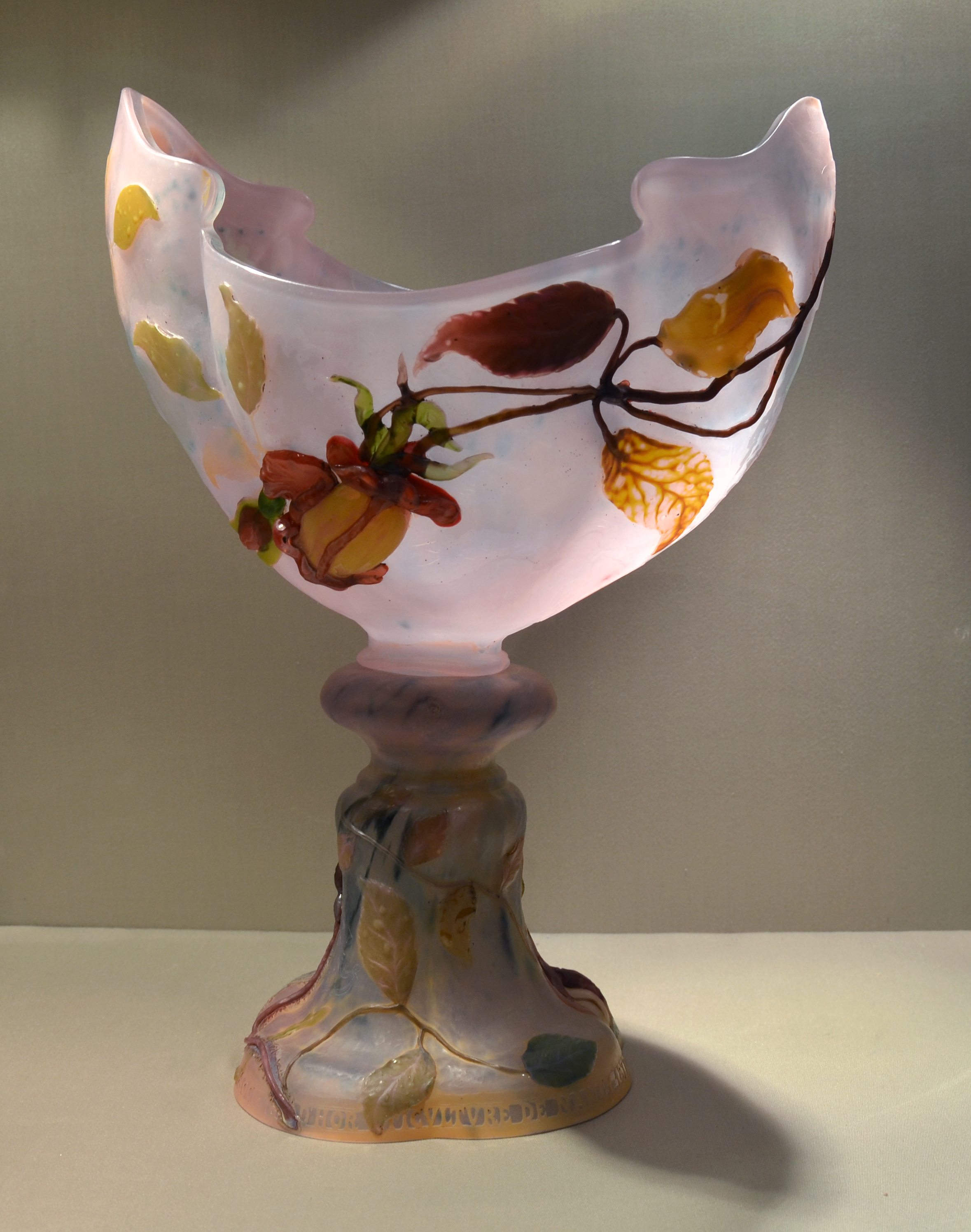
Rose de France cup by Gallé (1901)

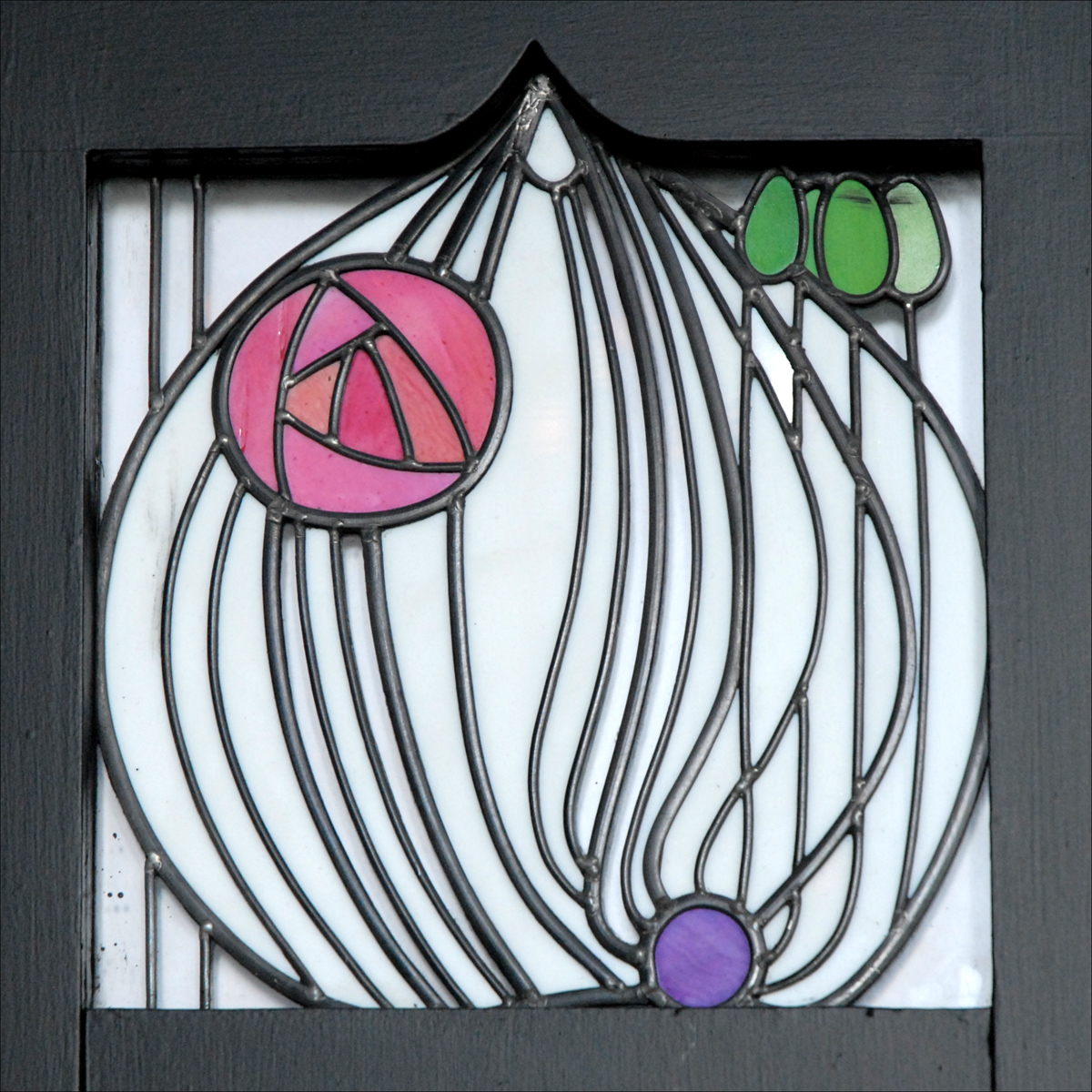
Window for the House of an Art Lover, by Margaret Macdonald Mackintosh (1901)

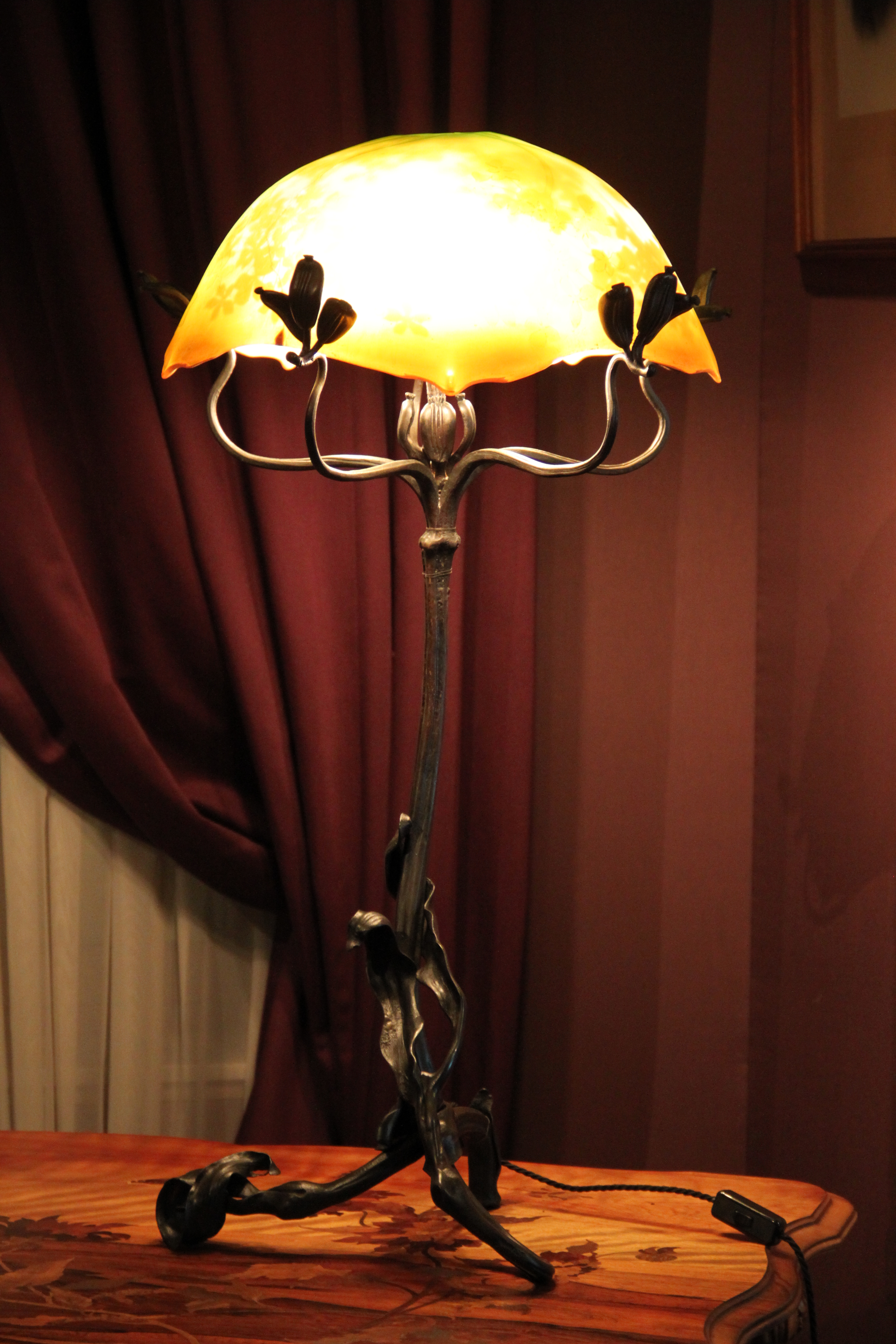
Lampe aux ombelles by Gallé (c. 1902)

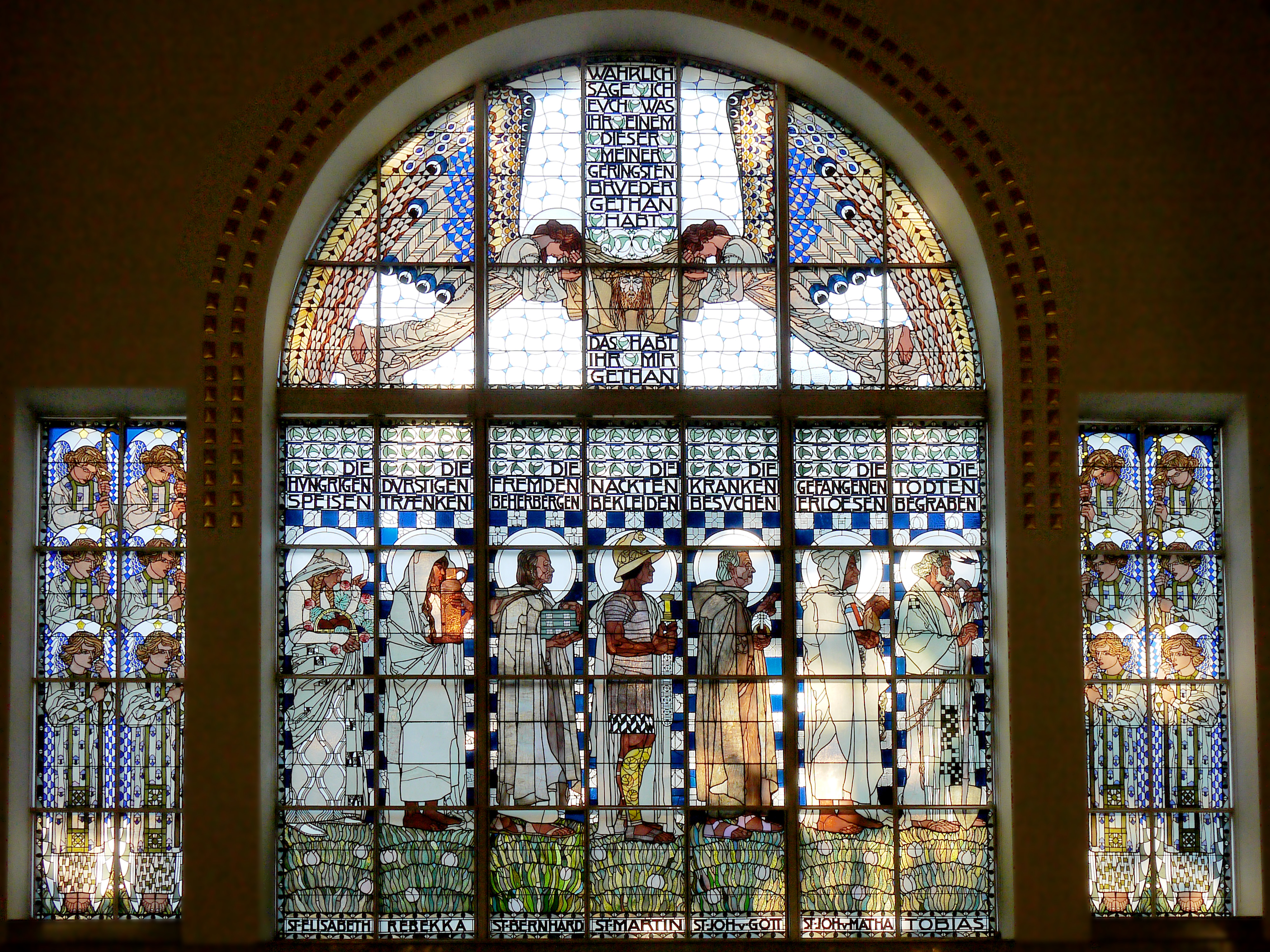
Stained glass windows by Koloman Moser for the Church of St. Leopold, Vienna (1902–1907)

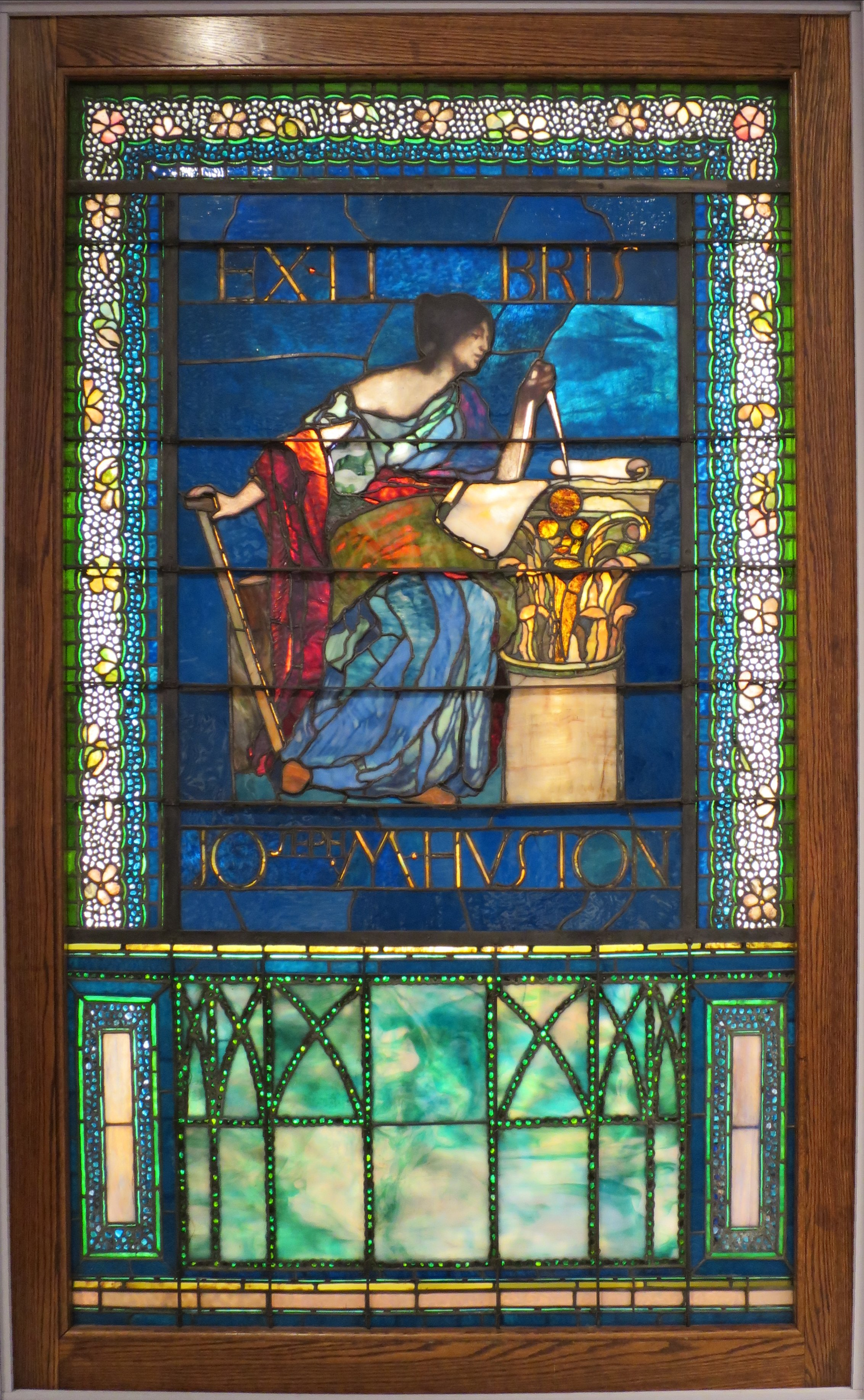
Architecture stained glass window by John La Farge (1903)

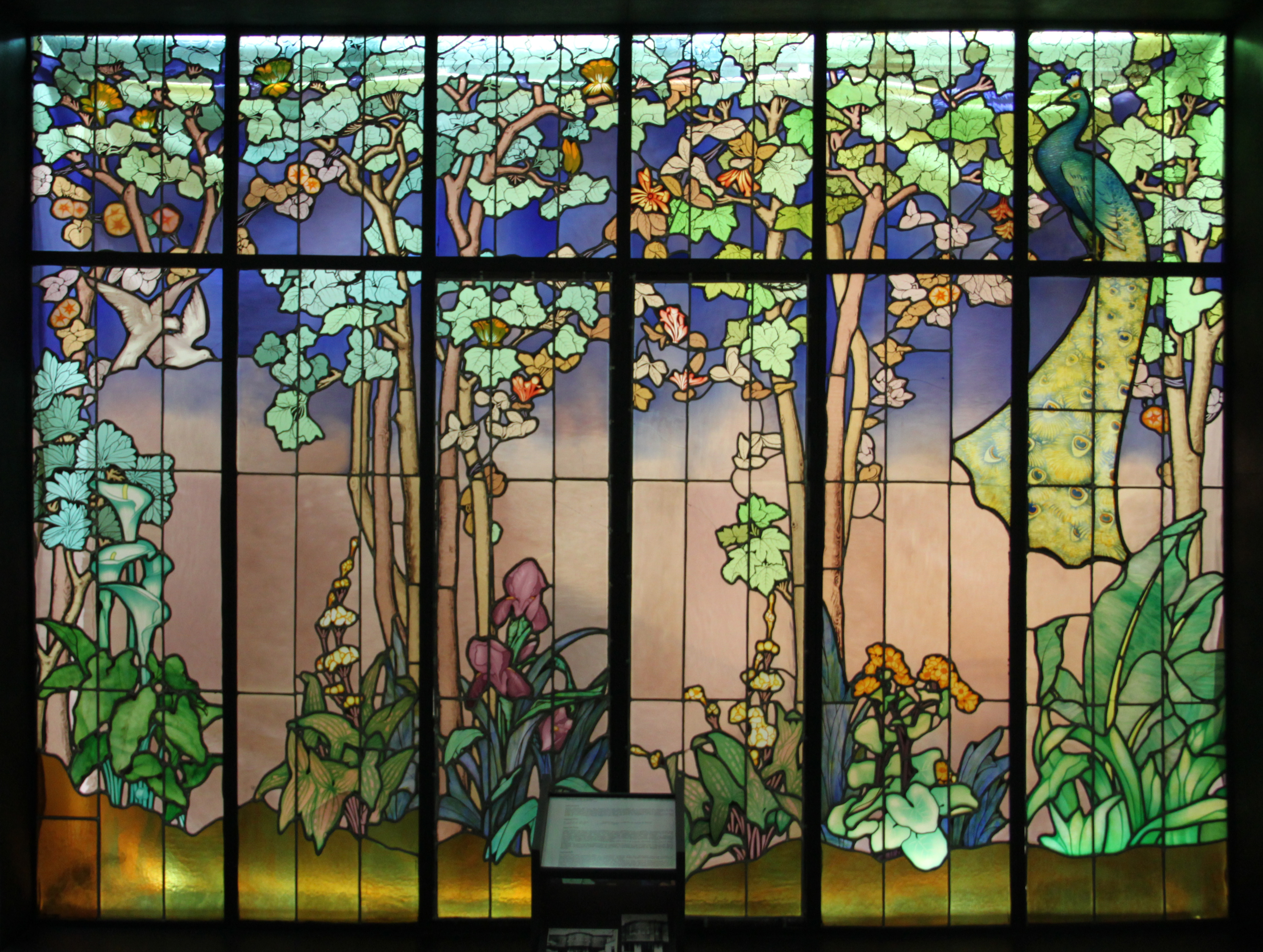
Stained glass window Veranda de la Salle by Jacques Grüber in Nancy, France (1904)

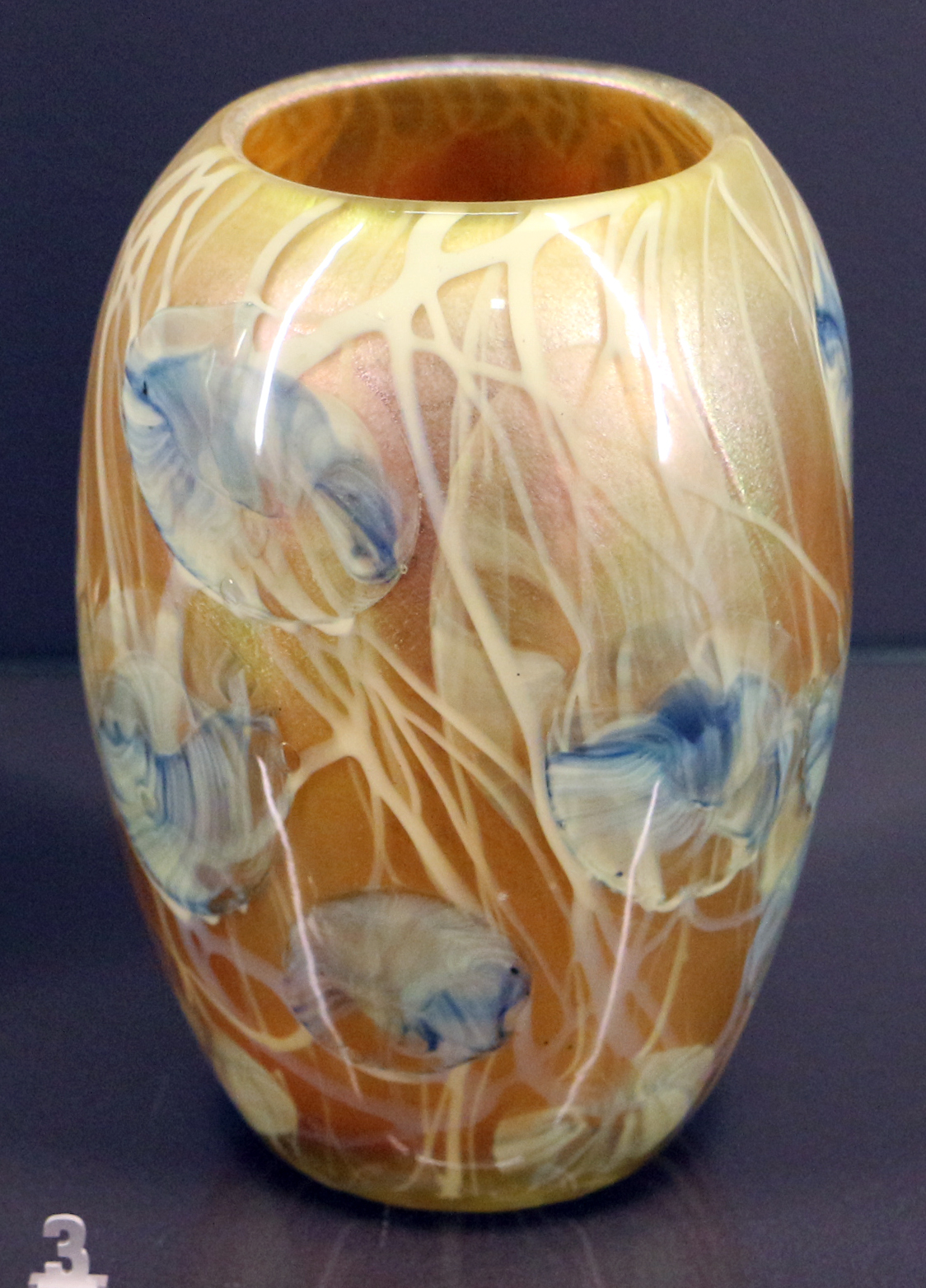
Iridescent vase by Tiffany (1904)

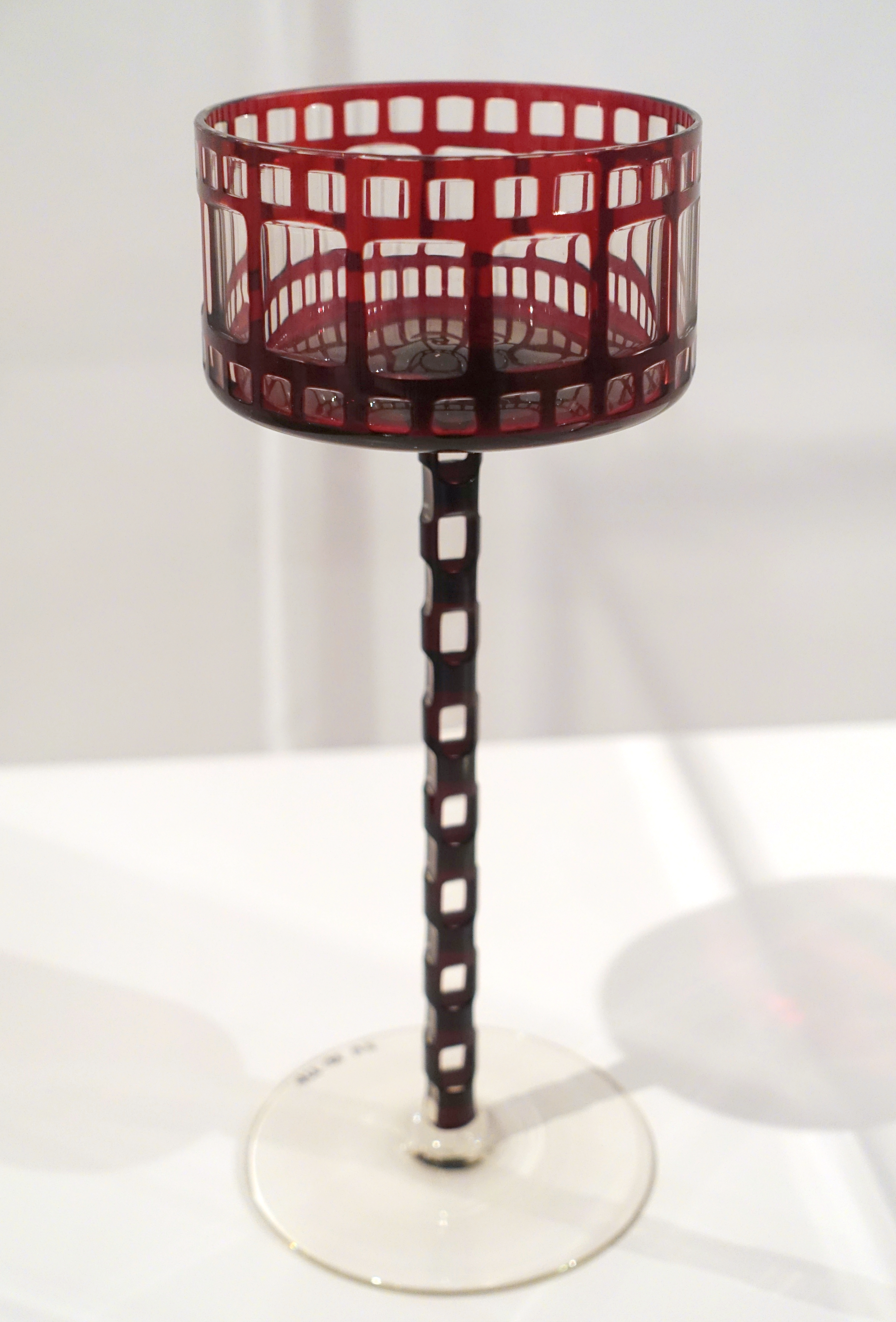
Glass designed by Otto Prutscher (1909)

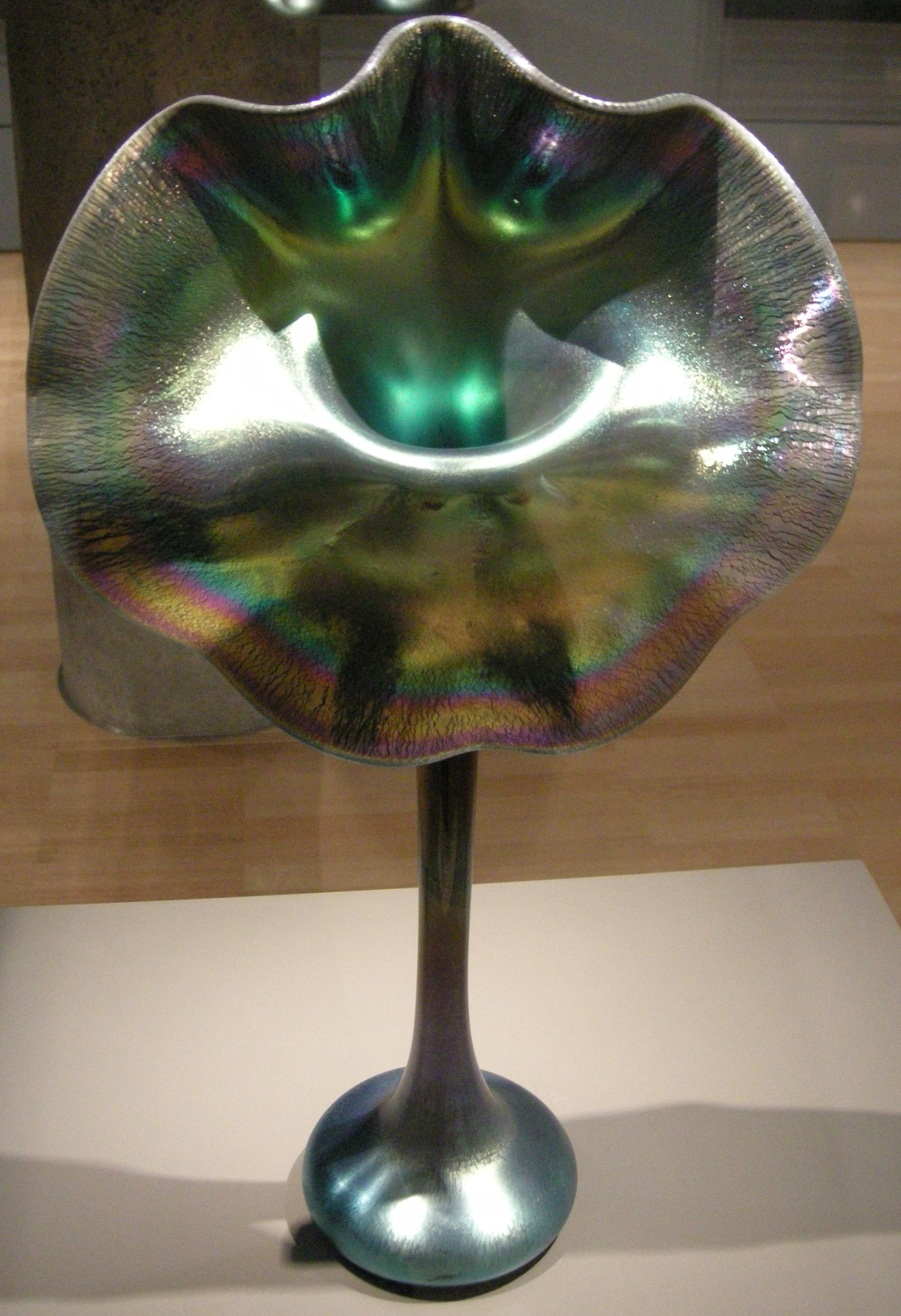
Jack-in-the-pulpit vase by Tiffany (c. 1913)

Glass art was a medium in which Art Nouveau found new and varied ways of expression. Intense amount of experimentation went on, particularly in France, to find new effects of transparency and opacity: in engraving win cameo, double layers, and acid engraving, a technique that permitted production in series. The city of Nancy became an important centre for the French glass industry, and the workshops of Émile Gallé and the Daum studio, led by Auguste and Antonin Daum, were located there. They worked with many notable designers, including Ernest Bussière, Henri Bergé, and Amalric Walter. They developed a new method of incrusting glass by pressing fragments of different coloured glass into the unfinished piece. They often collaborated with the furniture designer Louis Majorelle, whose home and workshops were in Nancy. Another feature of Art Nouveau was the use of stained glass windows with that style of floral themes in residential salons, particularly in the Art Nouveau houses in Nancy. Many were the work of Jacques Grüber, who made windows for the Villa Majorelle and other houses.

In Belgium, the leading firm was the glass factory of Val Saint Lambert, which created vases in organic and floral forms, many of them designed by Philippe Wolfers. Wolfers was noted particularly for creating works of symbolist glass, often with metal decoration attached. In Bohemia, then a region of the Austro-Hungarian Empire noted for crystal manufacture, the companies J. & L. Lobmeyr and Joh. Loetz Witwe also experimented with new colouring techniques, producing more vivid and richer colours. In Germany, experimentation was led by Karl Köpping, who used blown glass to create extremely delicate glasses in the form of flowers; so delicate that few survive today.

In Vienna, the glass designs of the Secession movement were much more geometrical than those of France or Belgium; Otto Prutscher was the most rigorous glass designer of the movement. In Britain, a number of floral stained glass designs were created by Margaret Macdonald Mackintosh for the architectural display called The House of an Art Lover.

In the United States, Louis Comfort Tiffany and his designers became particularly famous for their lamps, whose glass shades used common floral themes intricately pieced together. Tiffany lamps gained popularity after the World's Columbian Exposition in Chicago in 1893, where Tiffany displayed his lamps in a Byzantine-like chapel. Tiffany experimented extensively with the processes of colouring glass, patenting in 1894 the process Favrile glass, which used metallic oxides to colour the interior of the molten glass, giving it an iridescent effect. His workshops produced several different series of the Tiffany lamp in different floral designs, along with stained glass windows, screens, vases and a range of decorative objects. His works were first imported to Germany, then to France by Siegfried Bing, and then became one of the decorative sensations of the 1900 Exposition. An American rival to Tiffany, Steuben Glass, was founded in 1903 in Corning, N.Y., by Frederick Carder, who, like Tiffany, used the Fevrile process to create surfaces with iridescent colours. Another notable American glass artist was John La Farge, who created intricate and colourful stained glass windows on both religious and purely decorative themes.

Examples of stained glass windows in churches can be found in the Art Nouveau religious buildings article.

=== Metal art ===
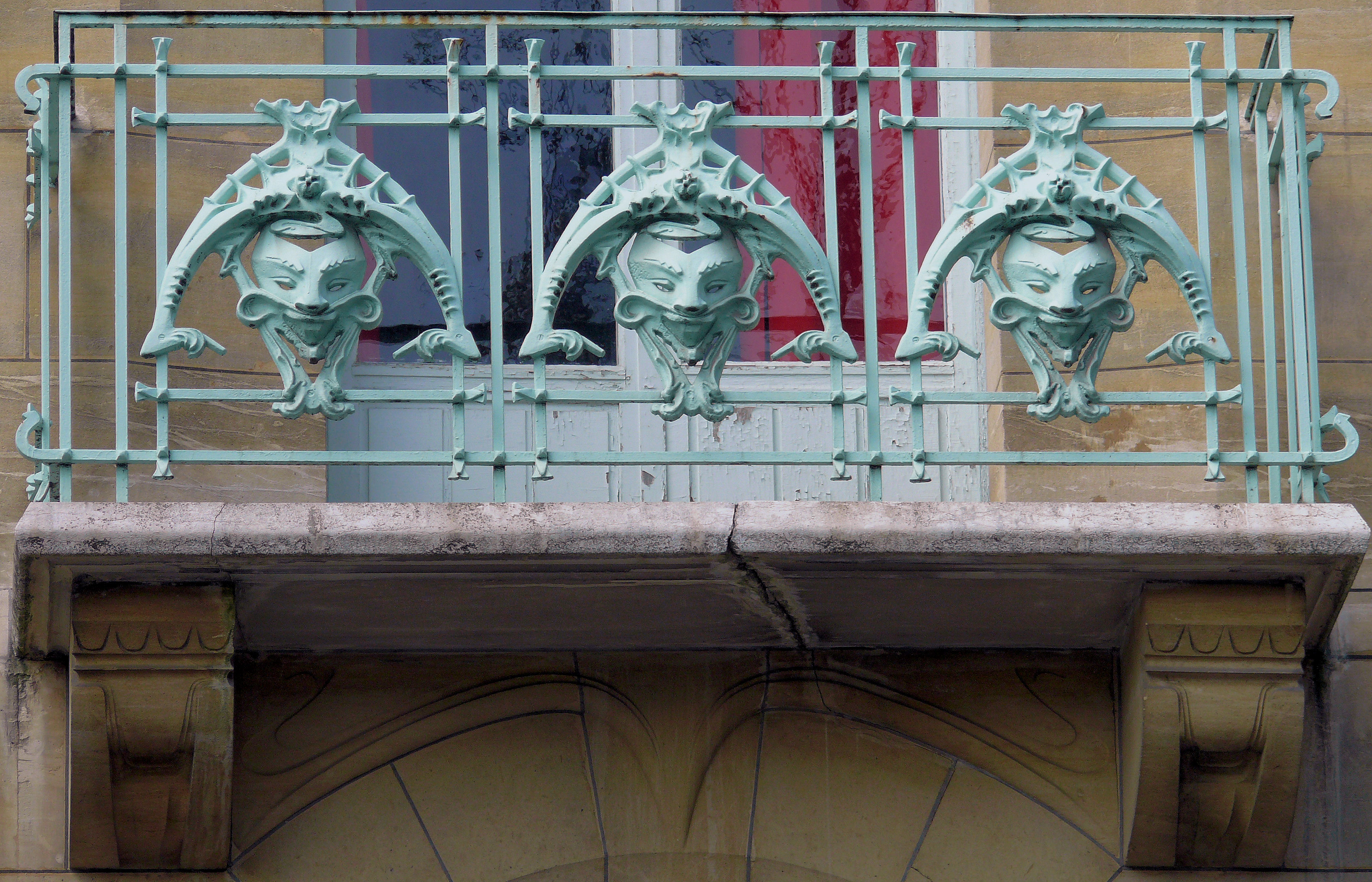
Wrought iron balcony of Castel Béranger in Paris, by Hector Guimard (1897–98)

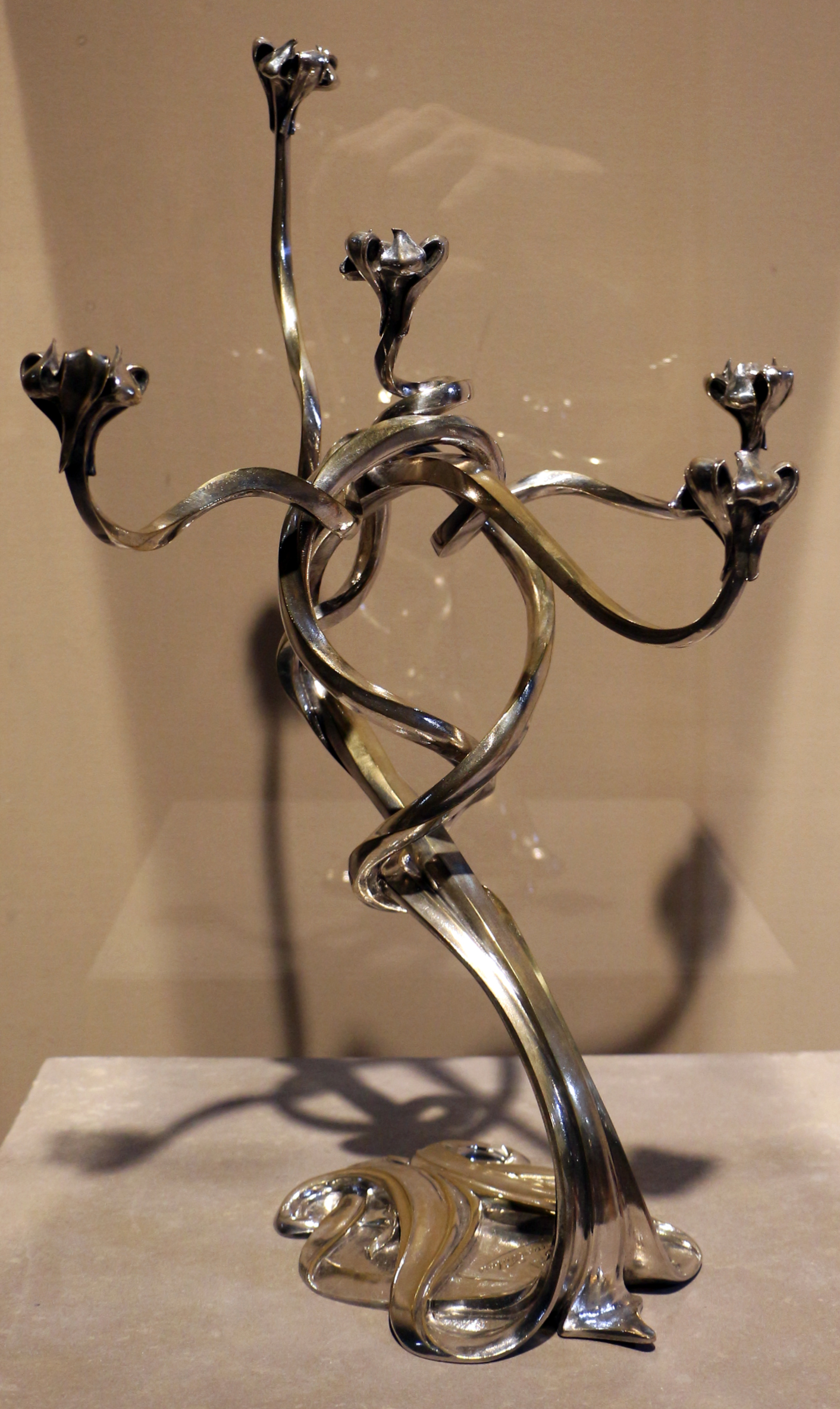
Tulip candelabra by Fernand Dubois (1899)

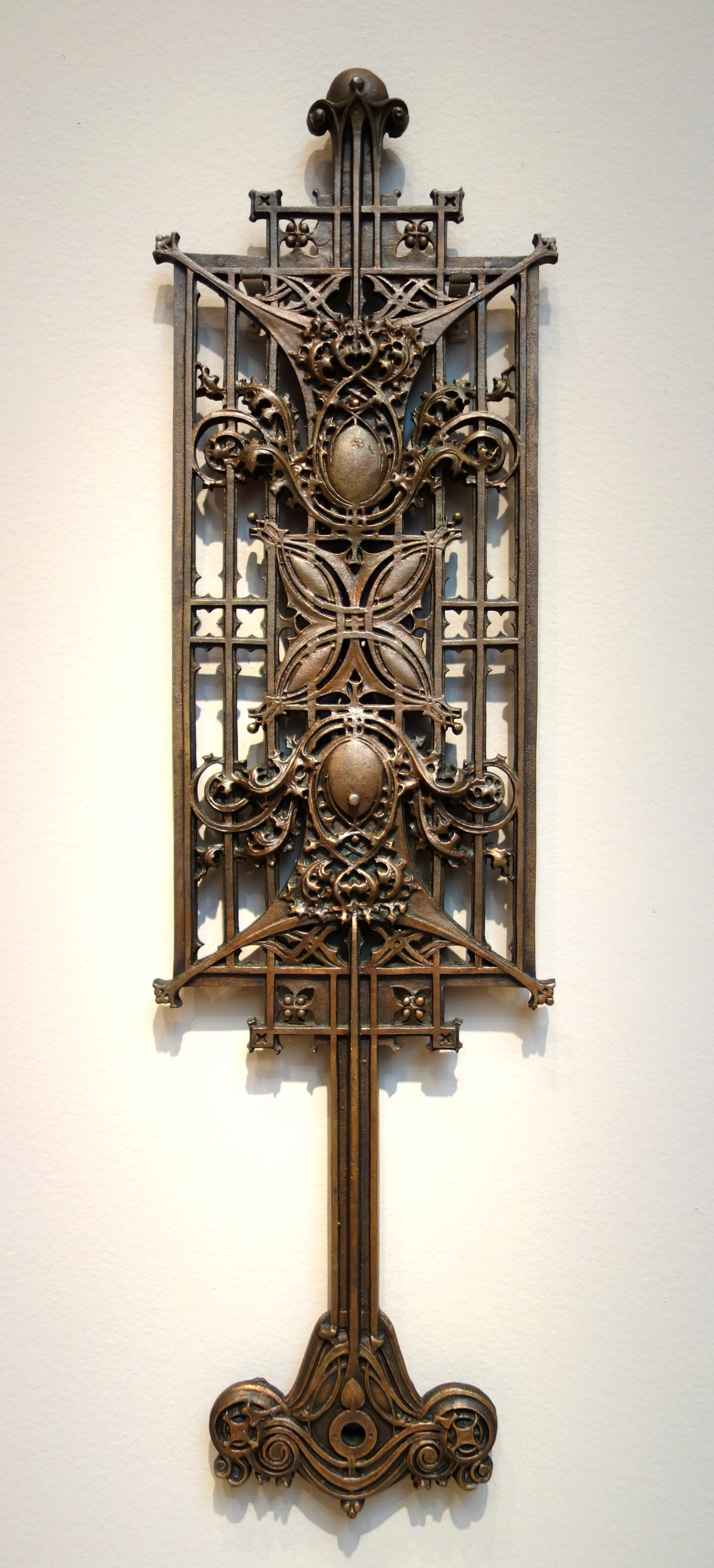
Cast iron Baluster by George Grant Elmslie (1899–1904)

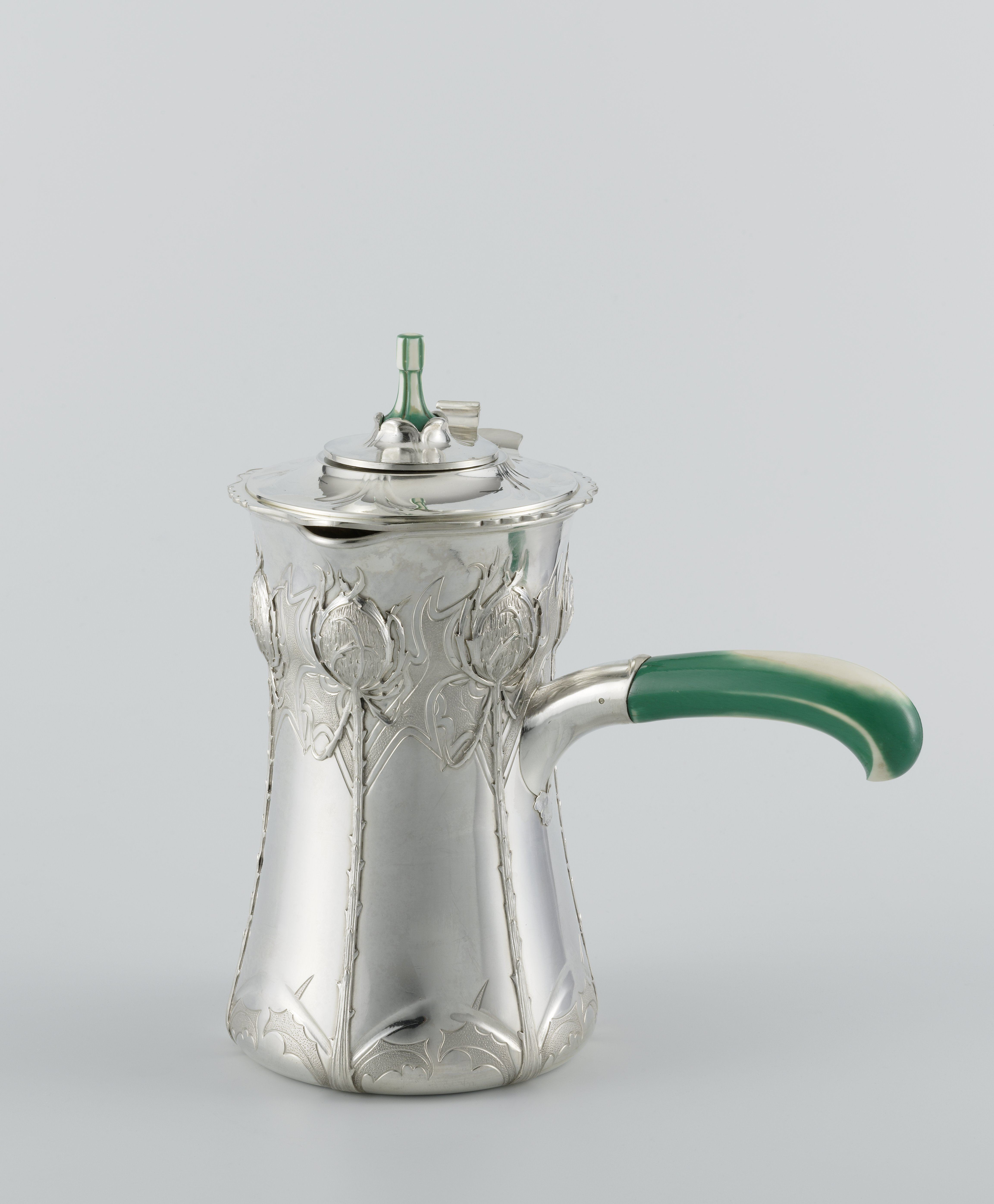
Chocolate pot with a molinet (stirring rod) by Lucien Bonvallet made of silver, ivory and palmwood (c. 1900)

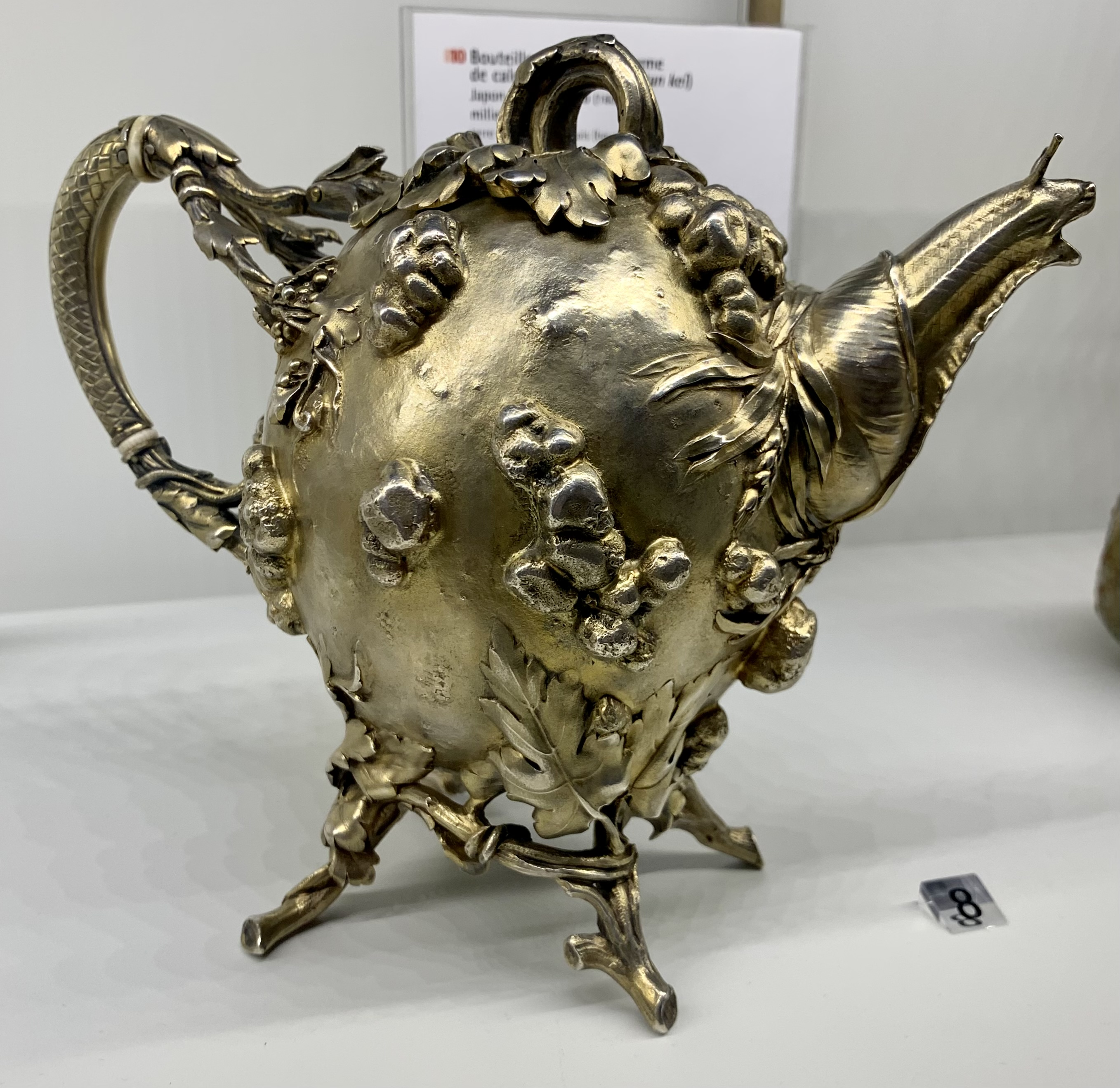
Teapot by Alphonse Debain made of gilt silver and ivory (1900)

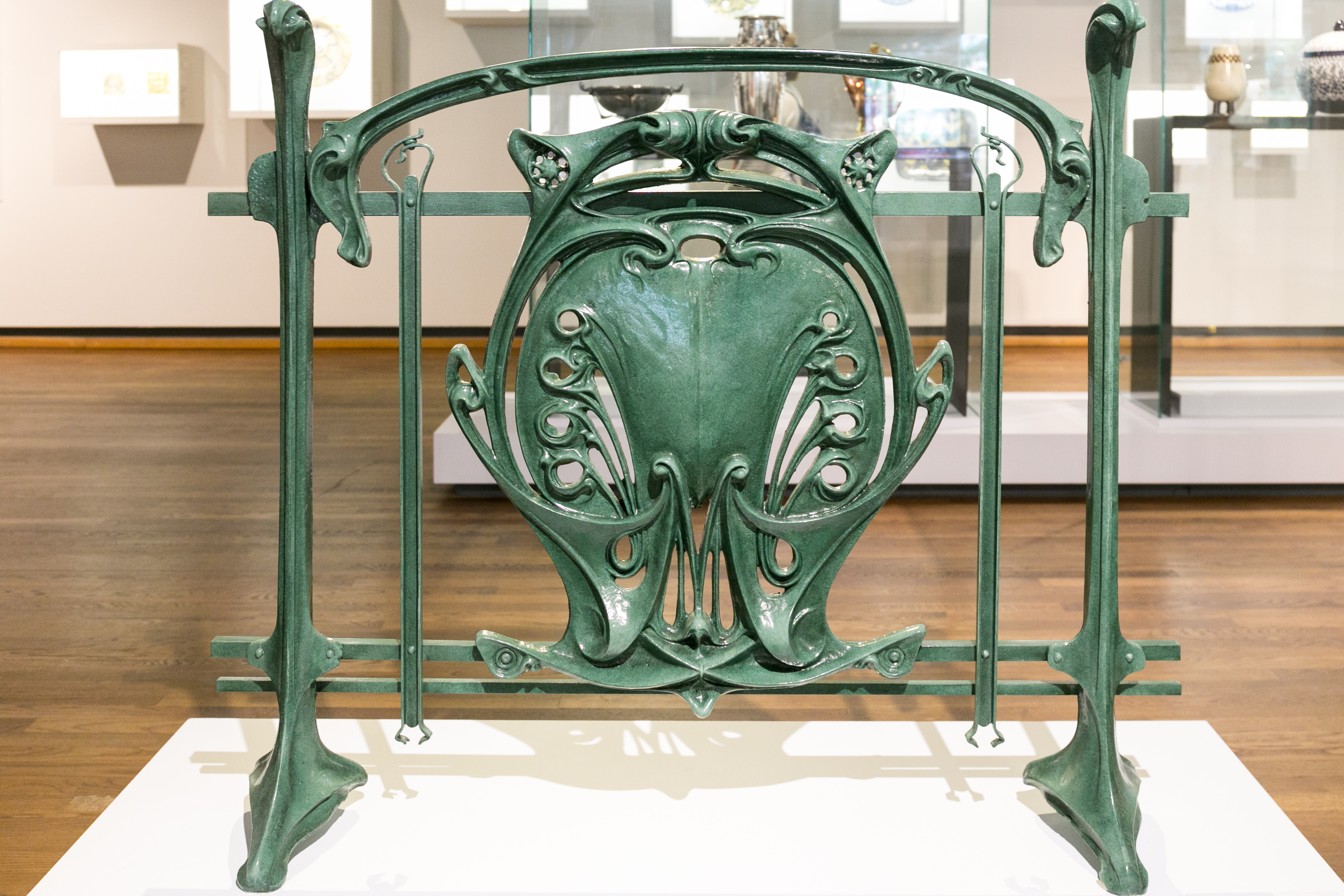
Paris Métro balustrade plaque by Guimard (1900)

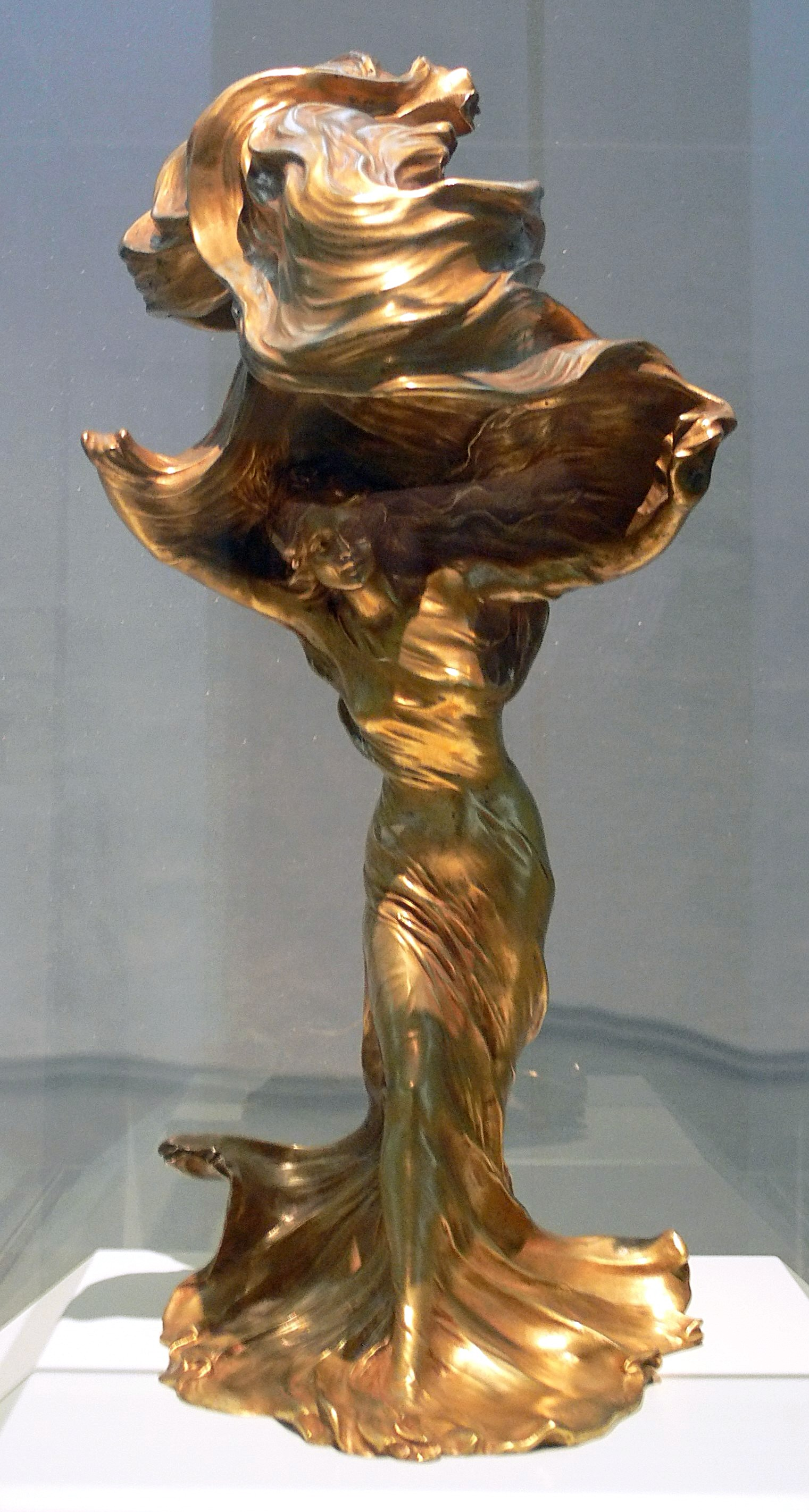
Table Lamp by François-Raoul Larche in gilt bronze, with the dancer Loïe Fuller as model (1901)

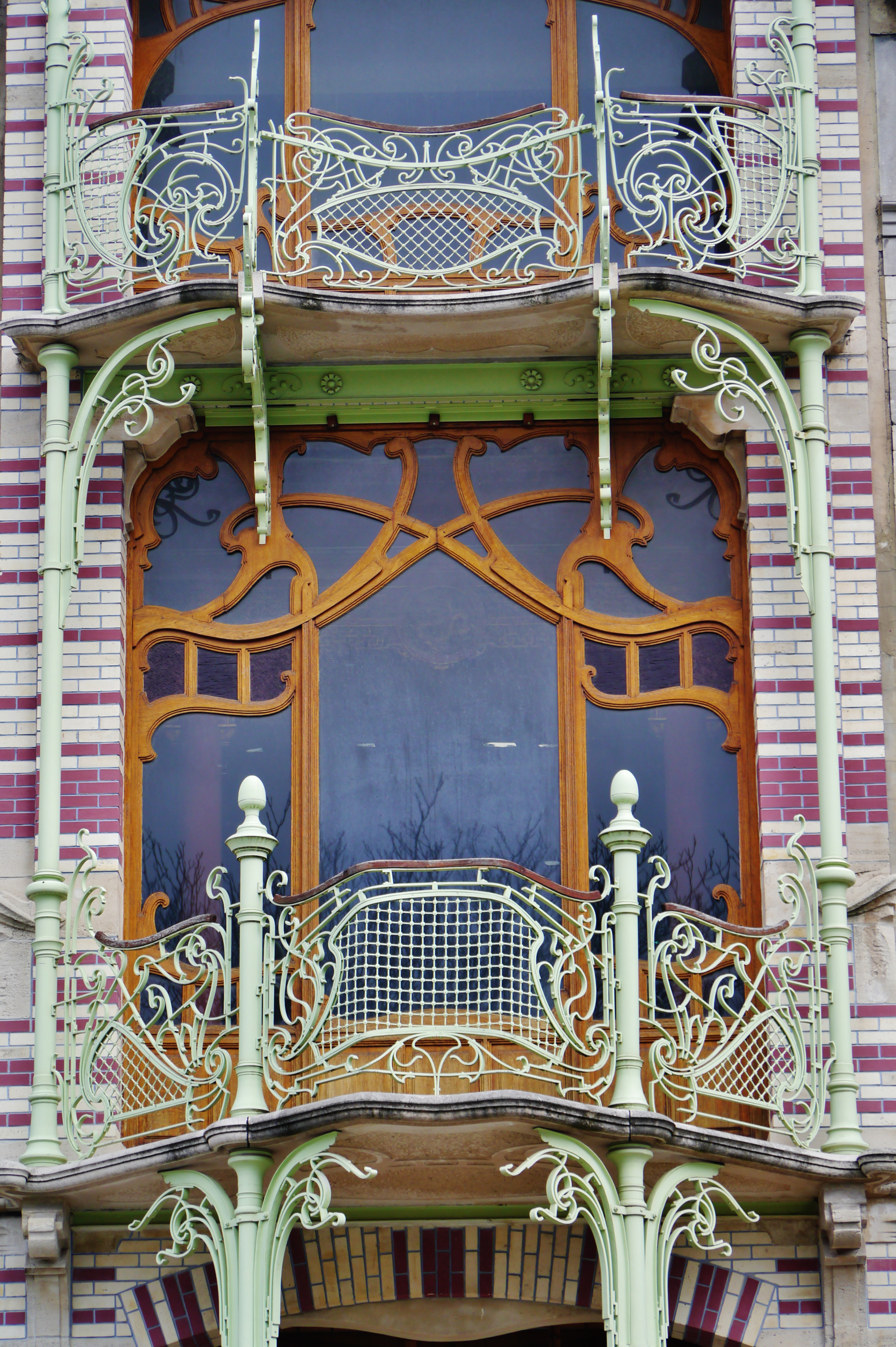
Wrought iron balconies of the Saint-Cyr House in Brussels, by Gustave Strauven (1901–1903)

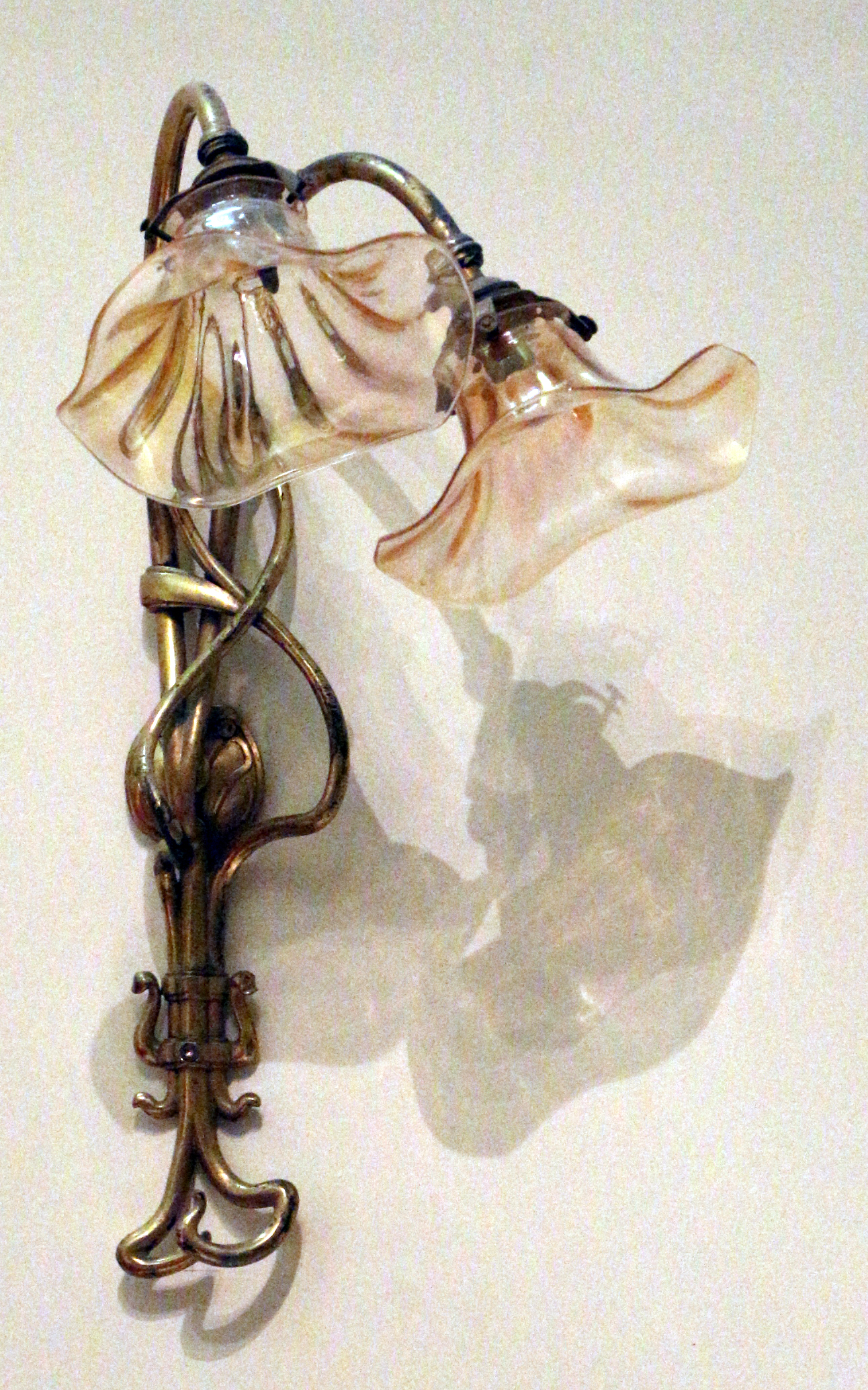
Light fixture by Victor Horta (1903)

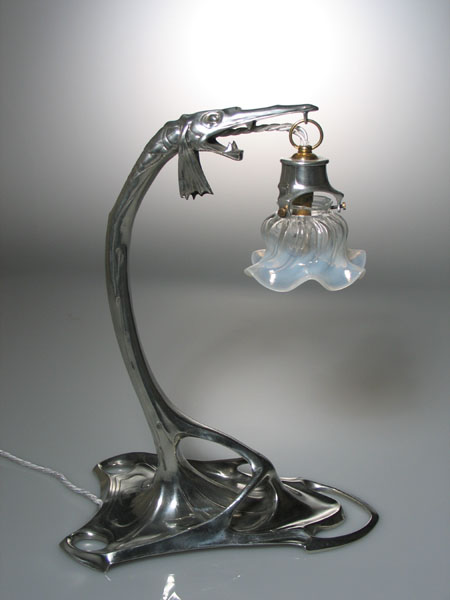
Lamp by German architect Friedrich Adler (1903–04)

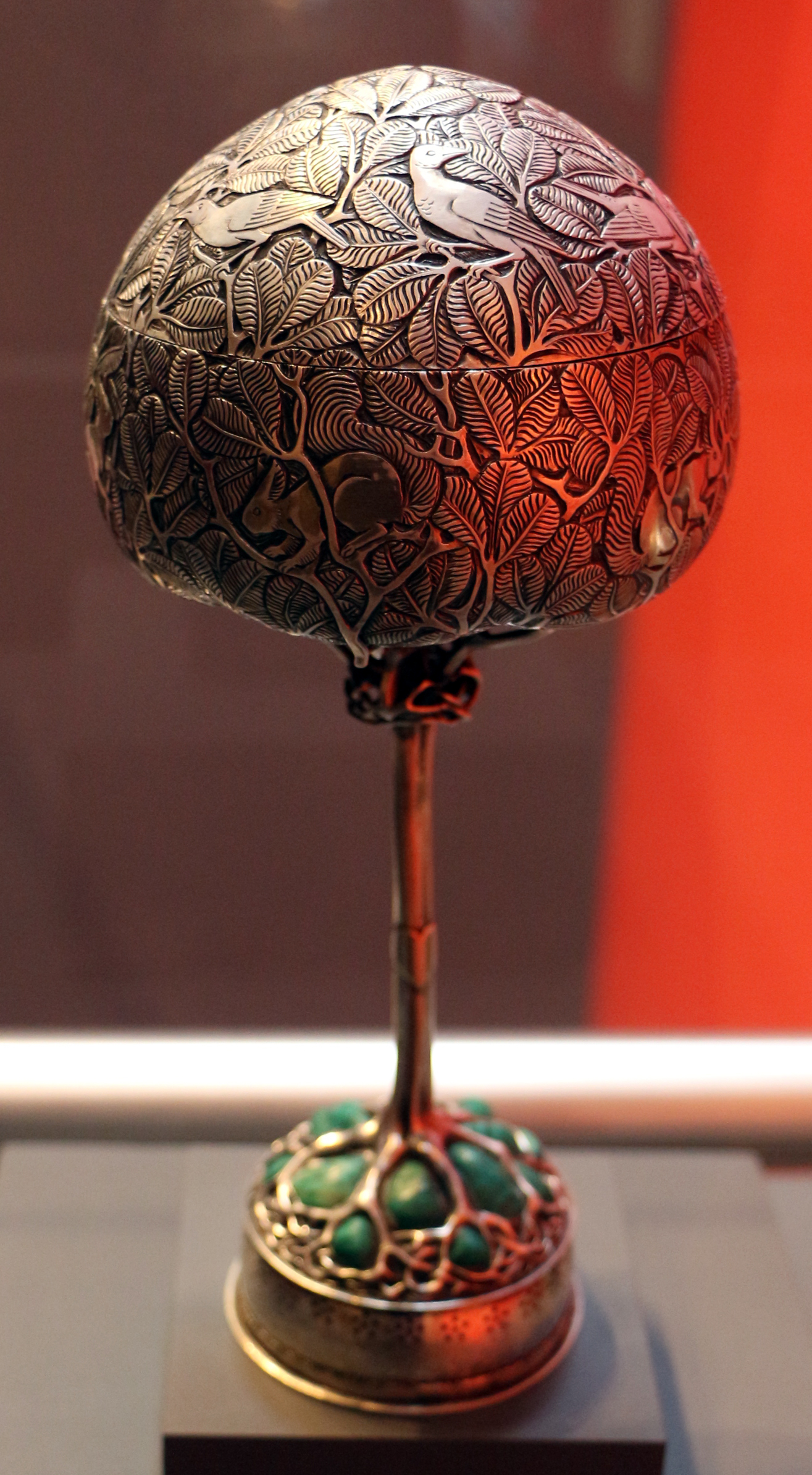
Lamp by Ernst Riegel made of silver and malachite (1905)

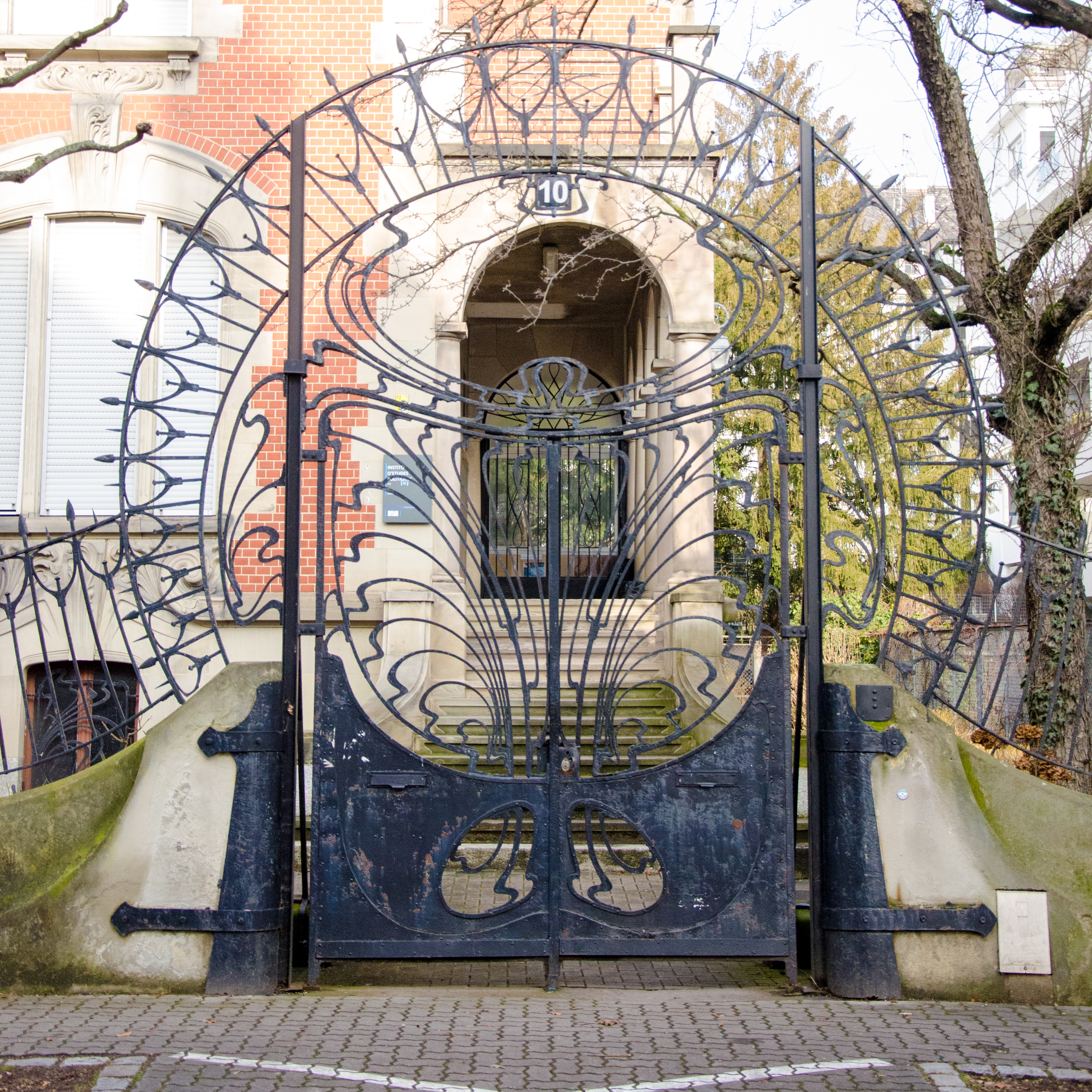
Gate of Villa Knopf in Strasbourg, France (1905)

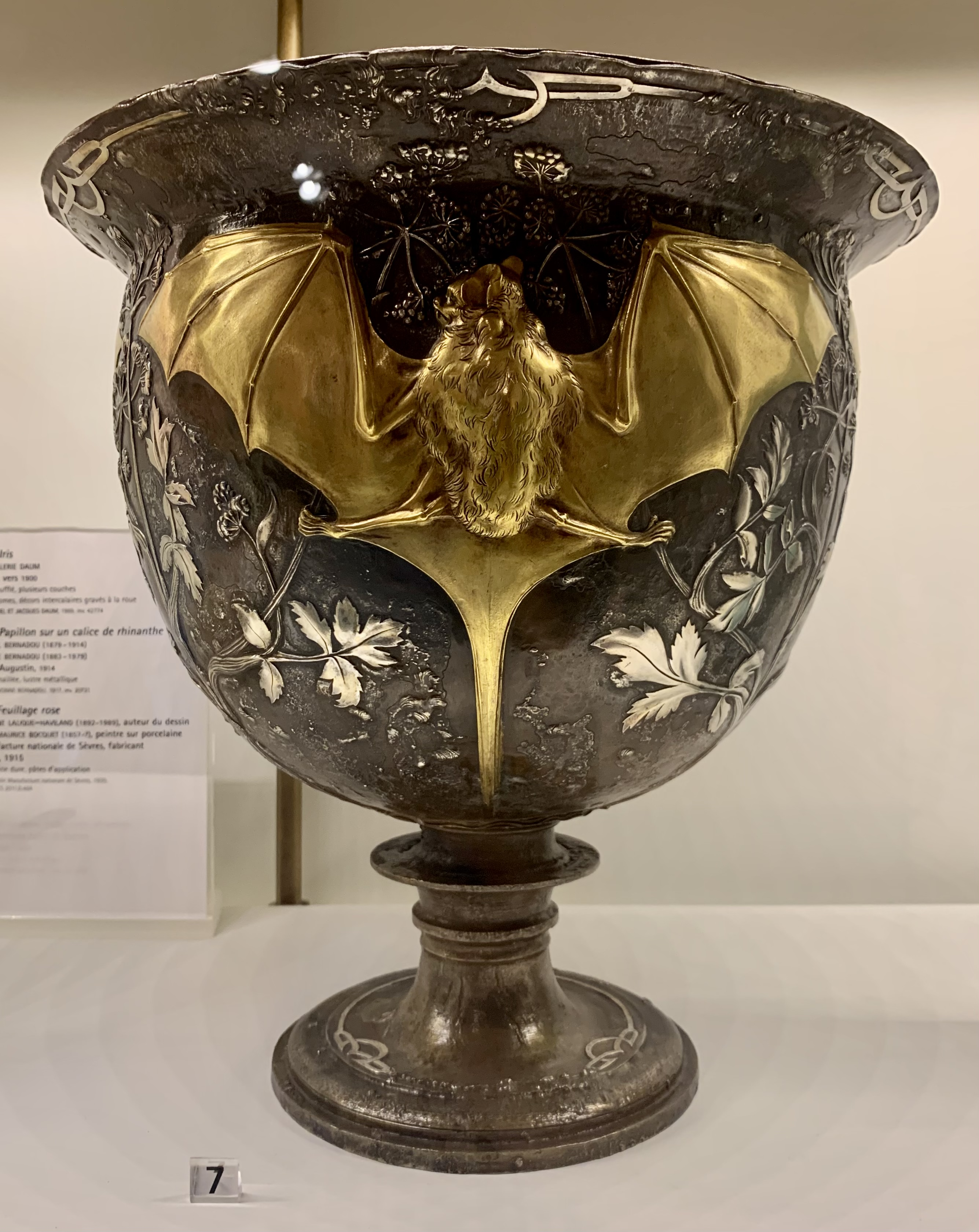
Bat goblet by Henri Husson made of embossed and hammered copper, gold and silver applications (c. 1909)

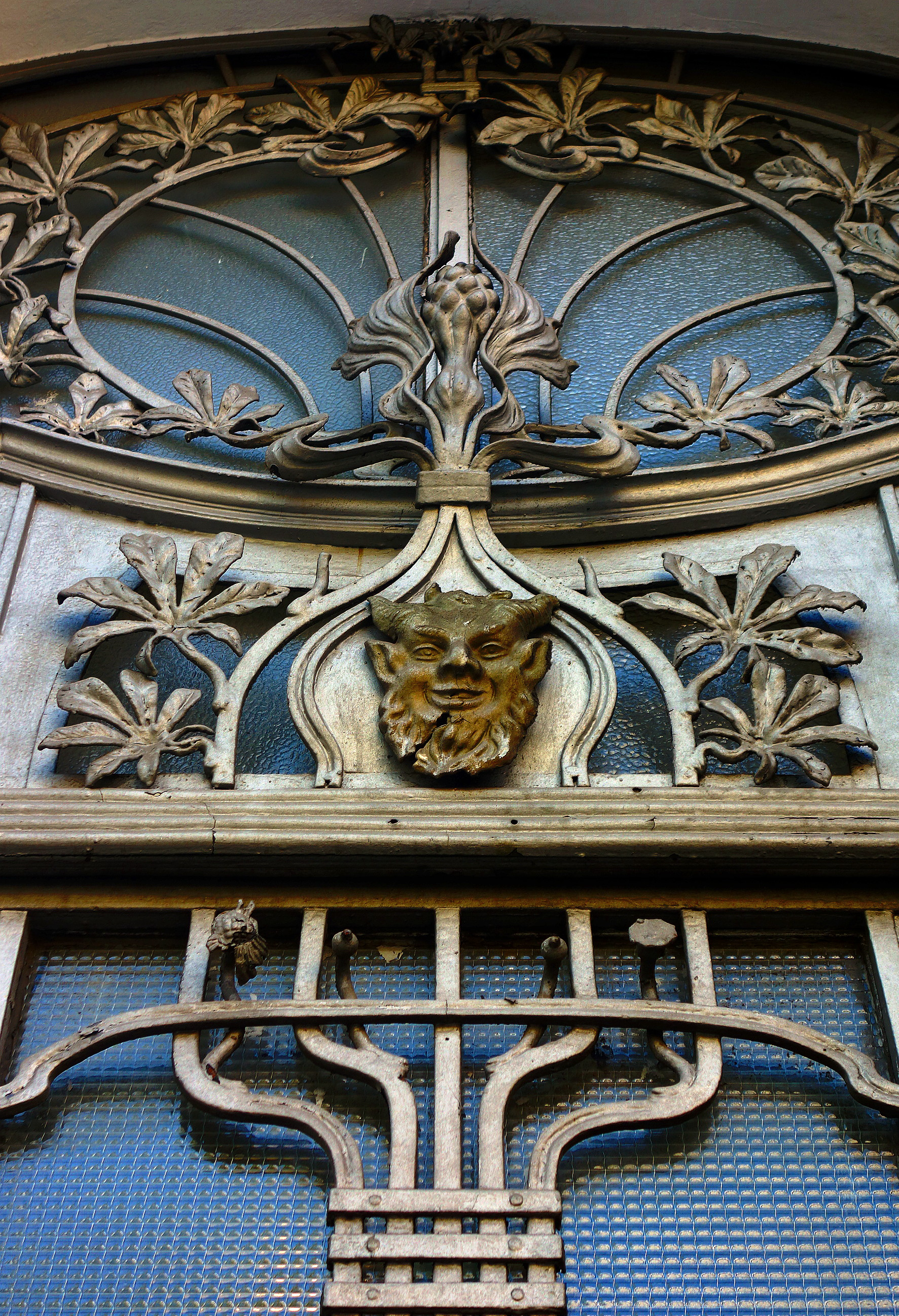
Door detail of Hauptstraße no. 11 in Berlin (unknown date)

The 19th-century architectural theorist Viollet-le-Duc had advocated showing, rather than concealing the iron frameworks of modern buildings, but Art Nouveau architects Victor Horta and Hector Guimard went a step further: they added iron decoration in curves inspired by floral and vegetal forms both in the interiors and exteriors of their buildings. They took the form of stairway railings in the interior, light fixtures, and other details in the interior, and balconies and other ornaments on the exterior. These became some of the most distinctive features of Art Nouveau architecture. The use of metal decoration in vegetal forms soon also appeared in silverware, lamps, and other decorative items.

In the United States, the designer George Grant Elmslie made extremely intricate cast iron designs for the balustrades and other interior decoration of the buildings of Chicago architect Louis Sullivan.

While French and American designers used floral and vegetal forms, Joseph Maria Olbrich and the other Secession artists designed teapots and other metal objects in a more geometric and sober style.

=== Jewellery ===
Dragonfly Lady brooch by René Lalique, made of gold, enamel, chrysoprase, moonstone, and diamonds (1897–98)

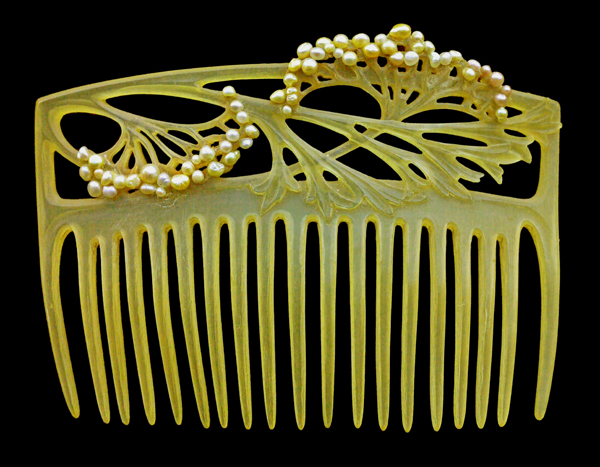
Carved horn decorated with pearls, by Louis Aucoc (c. 1900)

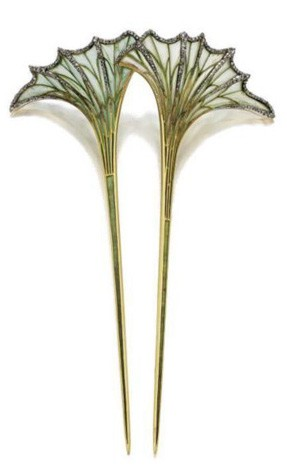
Translucent enamel flowers with small diamonds in the veins, by Aucoc (c. 1900)

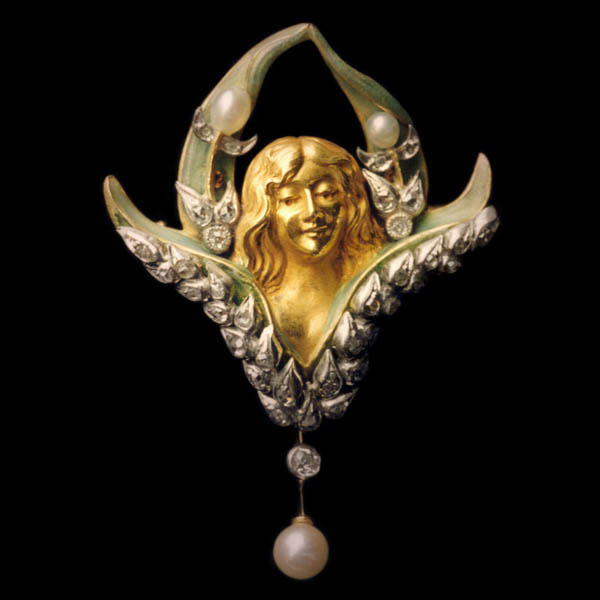
Flora brooch by Aucoc (c. 1900)

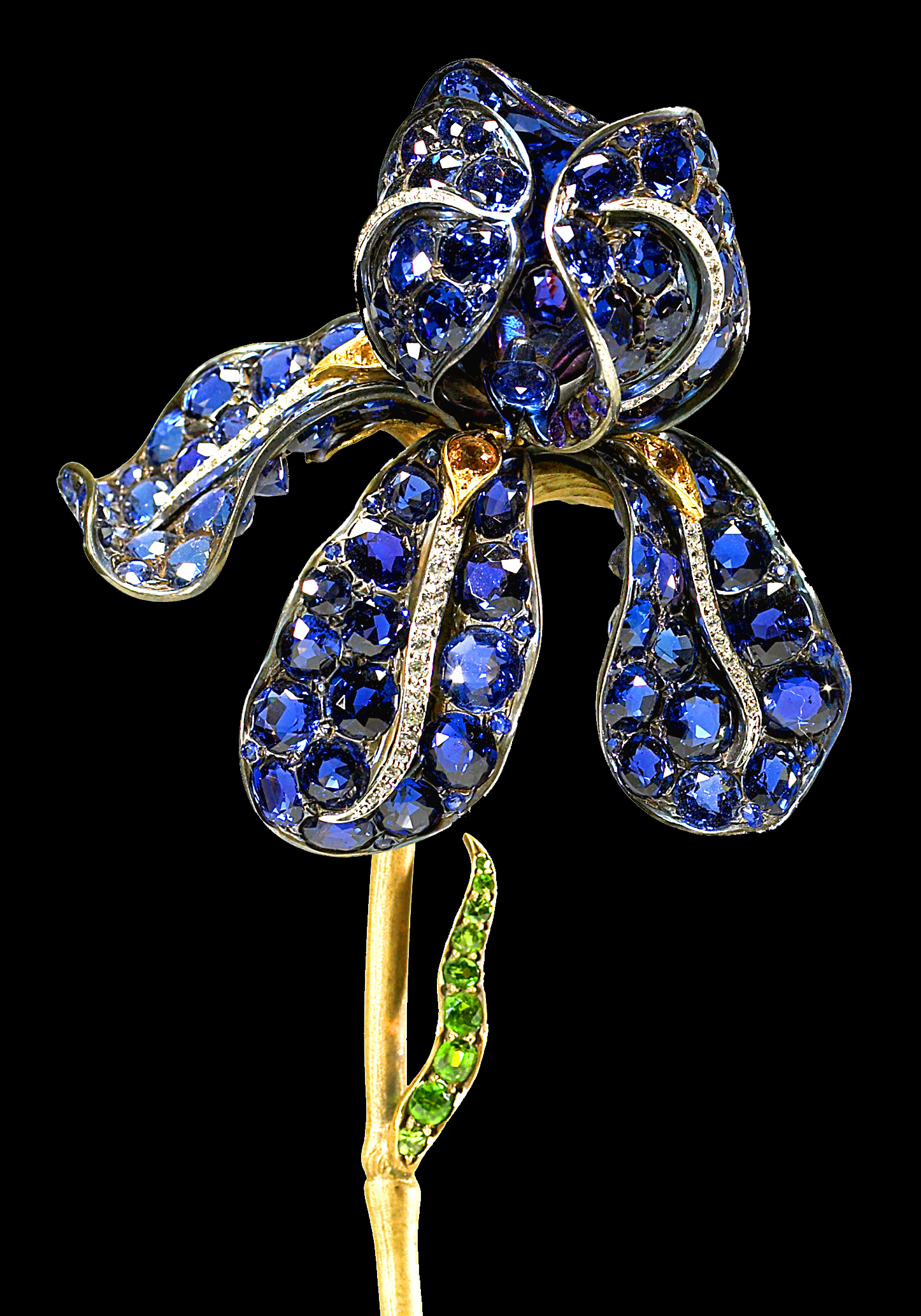
A corsage ornament by Philippe Wolfers (1900)

Brooch with woman by Lalique

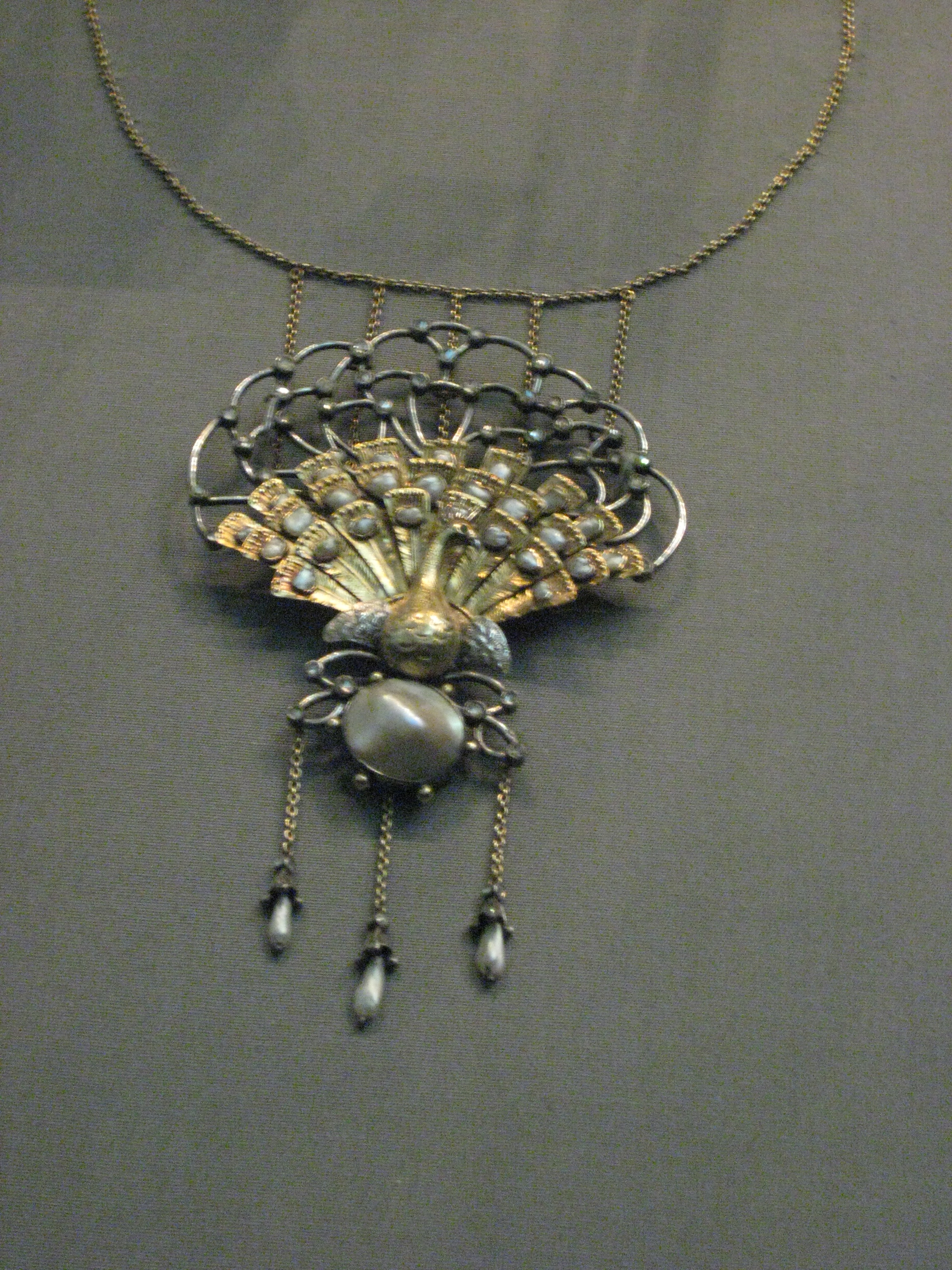
Necklace by Charles Robert Ashbee (1901)

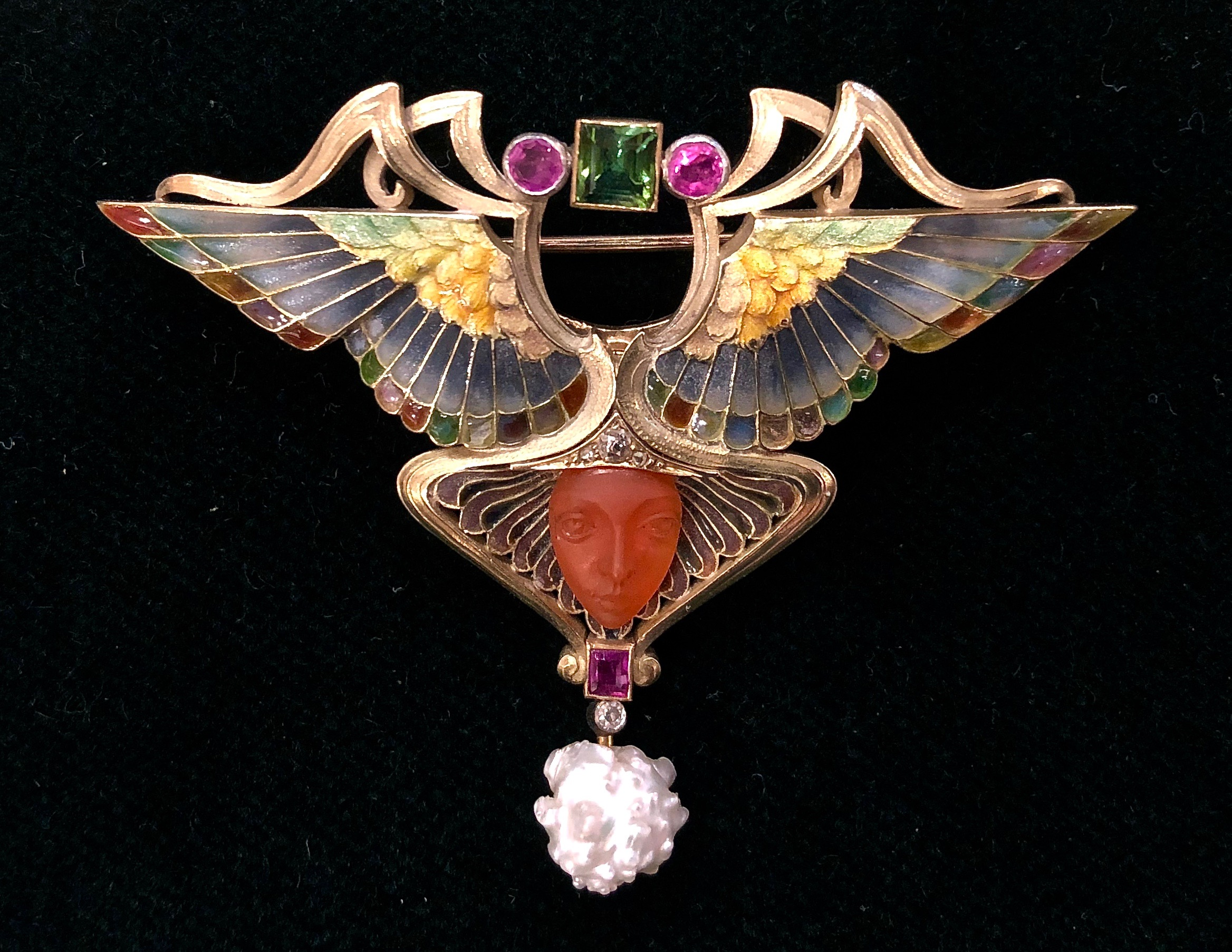
Niké brooch by Wolfers (1902), collection King Baudouin Foundation, depot: KMKG-MRAH

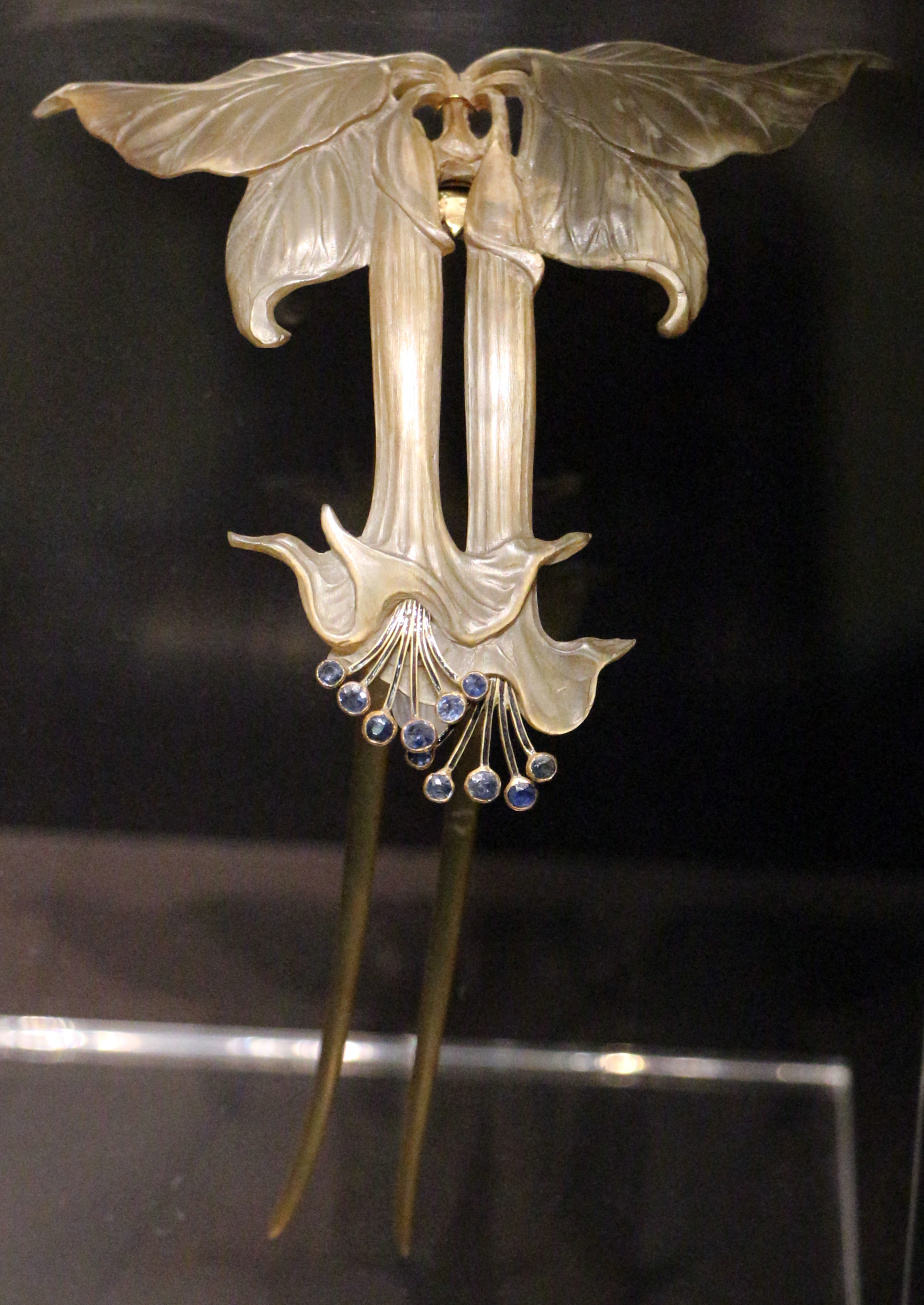
Brooch of horn with enamel, gold and aquamarine by Paul Follot (1904–1909)

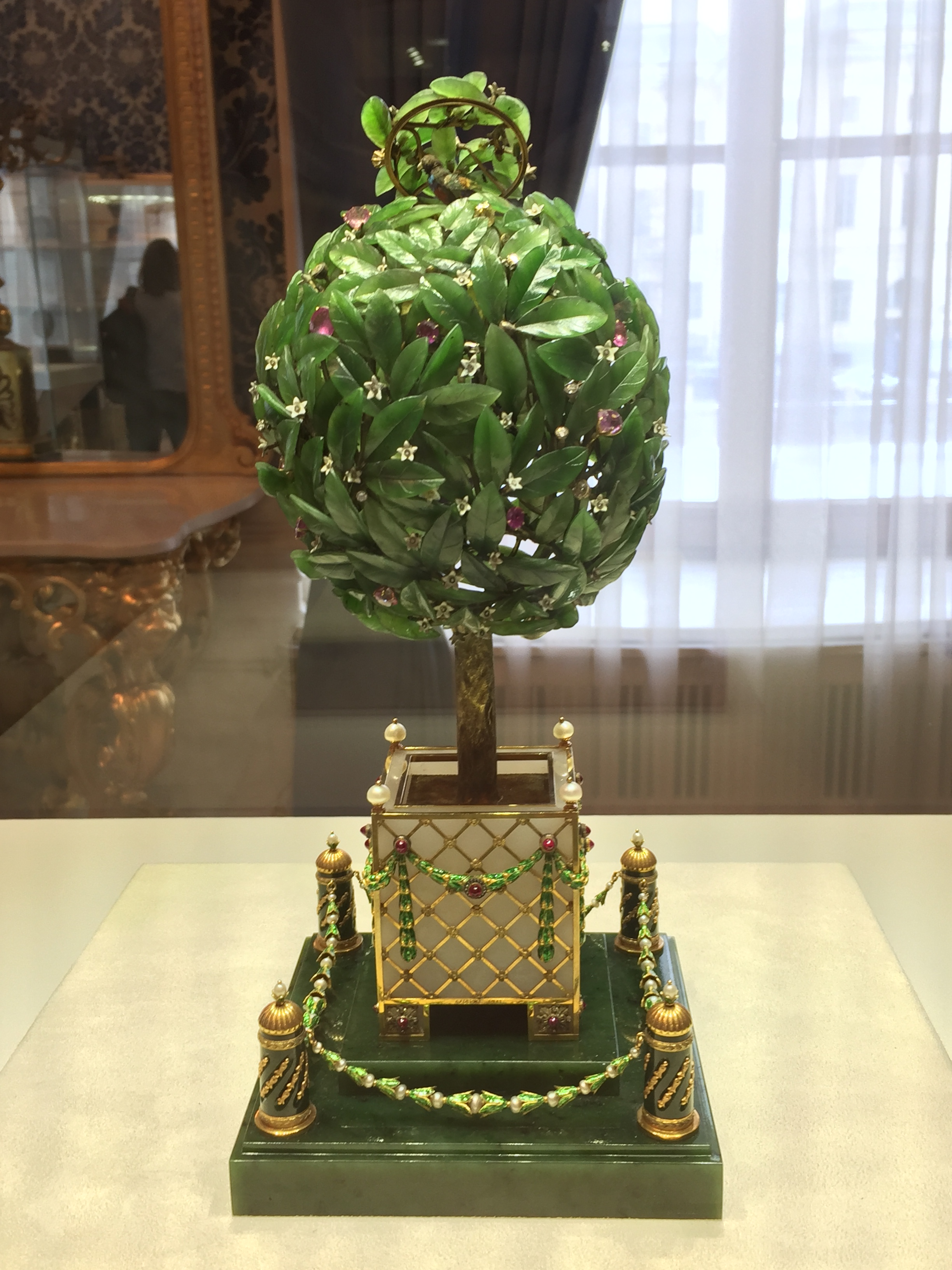
Bay Tree Fabergé egg (1911)

Art Nouveau jewellery's characteristics include subtle curves and lines. Its design often features natural objects including flowers, animals or birds. The female body is also popular often appearing on cameos. It frequently included long necklaces made of pearls or sterling-silver chains punctuated by glass beads or ending in a silver or gold pendant, itself often designed as an ornament to hold a single, faceted jewel of amethyst, peridot, or citrine.

Art Nouveau jewellery is distinguished by its extensive use of detailed, symbolic motifs that embody the movement's deep connection to nature and mythology. Predominant motifs include the ethereal forms of dragonflies and peacocks, which symbolise transformation and beauty, and the detailed depictions of plants and flowers, highlighting nature's cyclicality and growth. Intricately designed insects like butterflies and scarabs, often rendered with meticulous enamelling, add a layer of mysticism, symbolising rebirth and protection. This style also frequently featured sinuous figures of women, suggesting sensuality and the connection to the earth. More ominous figures such as snakes and mythical creatures like Medusas and chimeras were used to evoke the darker aspects of the natural and mythical worlds. The use of these motifs was not merely for embellishment; each was imbued with meanings, reflecting Art Nouveau's philosophy of integrating art, nature, and spiritual symbolism.

The Art Nouveau period brought a notable stylistic revolution to the jewellery industry, led largely by the major firms in Paris. For the previous two centuries, the emphasis in fine jewellery had been creating dramatic settings for diamonds. During the reign of Art Nouveau, diamonds usually played a supporting role. Jewellers experimented with a wide variety of other stones, including agate, garnet, opal, moonstone, aquamarine and other semi-precious stones, and with a wide variety of new techniques, among others enamelling, and new materials, including horn, moulded glass, and ivory. These materials allowed them to create organic forms and intricate details, highlighting the era's departure from traditional jewellery design towards more artistic and expressive creations. Techniques like plique-à-jour enamelling were employed to achieve translucent effects akin to stained glass, adding depth and luminosity to their pieces.

Early notable Paris jewellers in the Art Nouveau style included Louis Aucoc, whose family jewellery firm dated to 1821. The most famous designer of the Art Nouveau period, René Lalique, served his apprenticeship in the Aucoc studio from 1874 to 1876. Lalique became a central figure of Art Nouveau jewellery and glass, using nature, from dragonflies to grasses, as his models. Artists from outside of the traditional world of jewellery, such as Paul Follot, best known as a furniture designer, experimented with jewellery designs. Other notable French Art Nouveau jewellery designers included Jules Brateau and Georges Henry. In the United States, the most famous designer was Louis Comfort Tiffany, whose work was shown at the shop of Siegfried Bing and also at the 1900 Paris Exposition. Siegfried Bing's Paris gallery, Maison de l'Art Nouveau, played a pivotal role in promoting Art Nouveau jewellery. By showcasing works from avant-garde jewellers like René Lalique, Henri Vever, and Edward Colonna, Bing elevated jewellery to the status of fine art and fostered international appreciation for the style.

In Britain, the most prominent figure was the Liberty & Co. & Cymric designer Archibald Knox, who made a variety of Art Nouveau pieces, including silver belt buckles. C. R. Ashbee designed pendants in the shapes of peacocks. The versatile Glasgow designer Charles Rennie Mackintosh also made jewellery, using traditional Celtic symbols. In Germany, the centre for Jugendstil jewellery was the city of Pforzheim, where most of the German firms, including Theodor Fahrner, were located. They quickly produced works to meet the demand for the new style.

=== Architecture and ornamentation ===
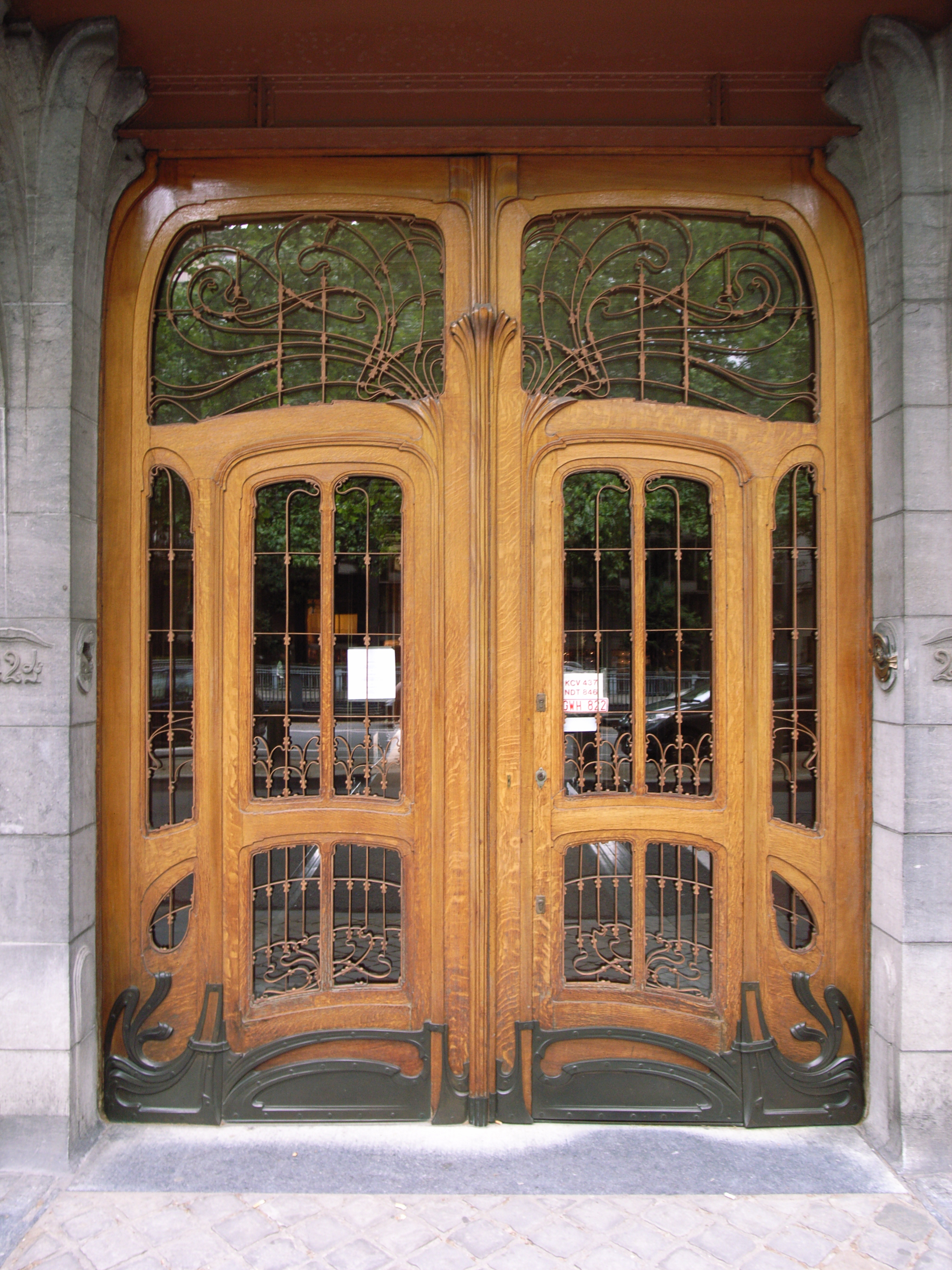
Entrance of Hôtel Solvay in Brussels by Victor Horta (1895–1900)

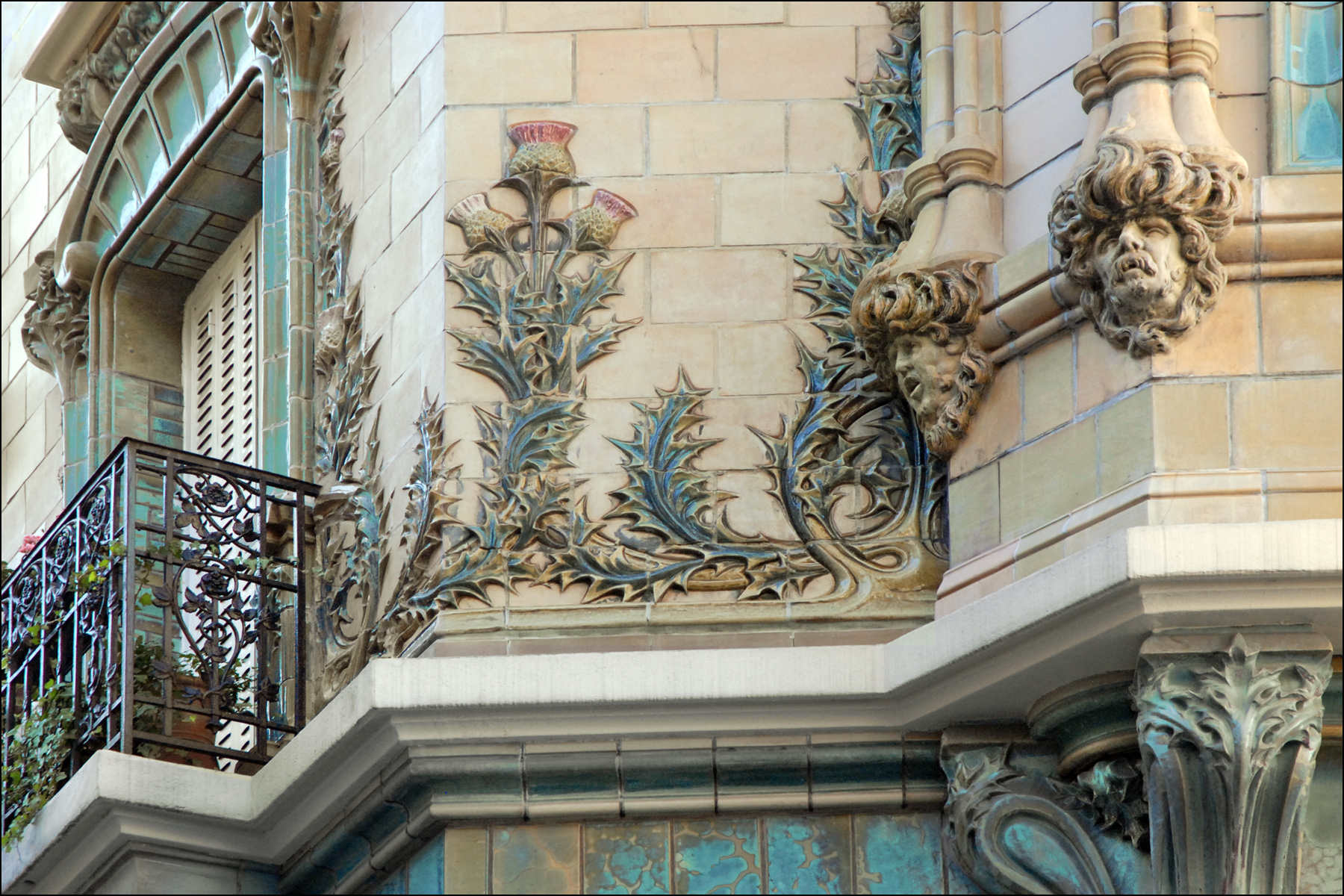
Thistles and curve-lined mascarons in decoration of Les Chardons building in Paris by Charles Klein (1903)

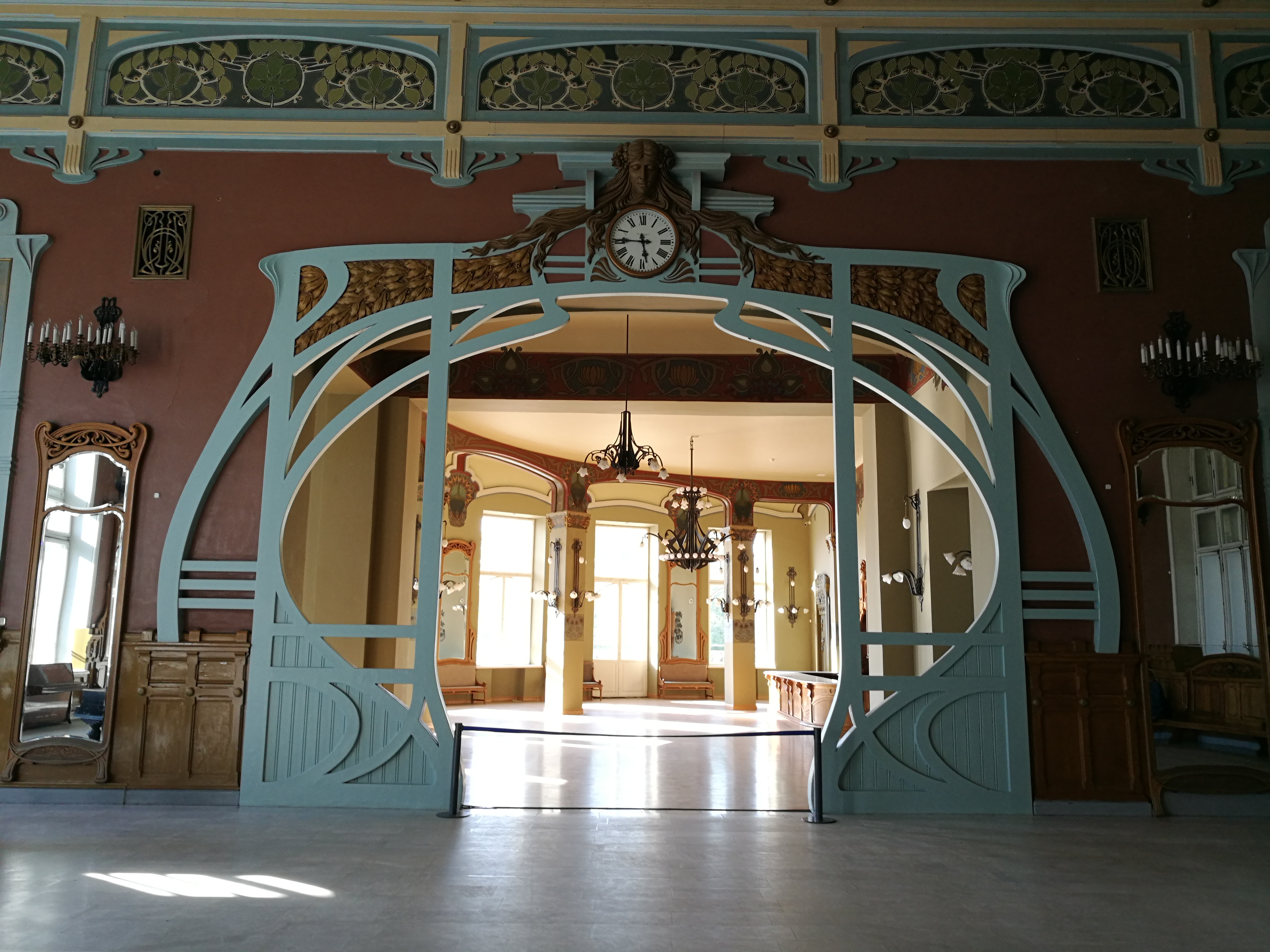
Whiplash motifs at Vitebsky railway station in Saint Petersburg by Sima Mihash and Stanislav Brzozowski (1904)

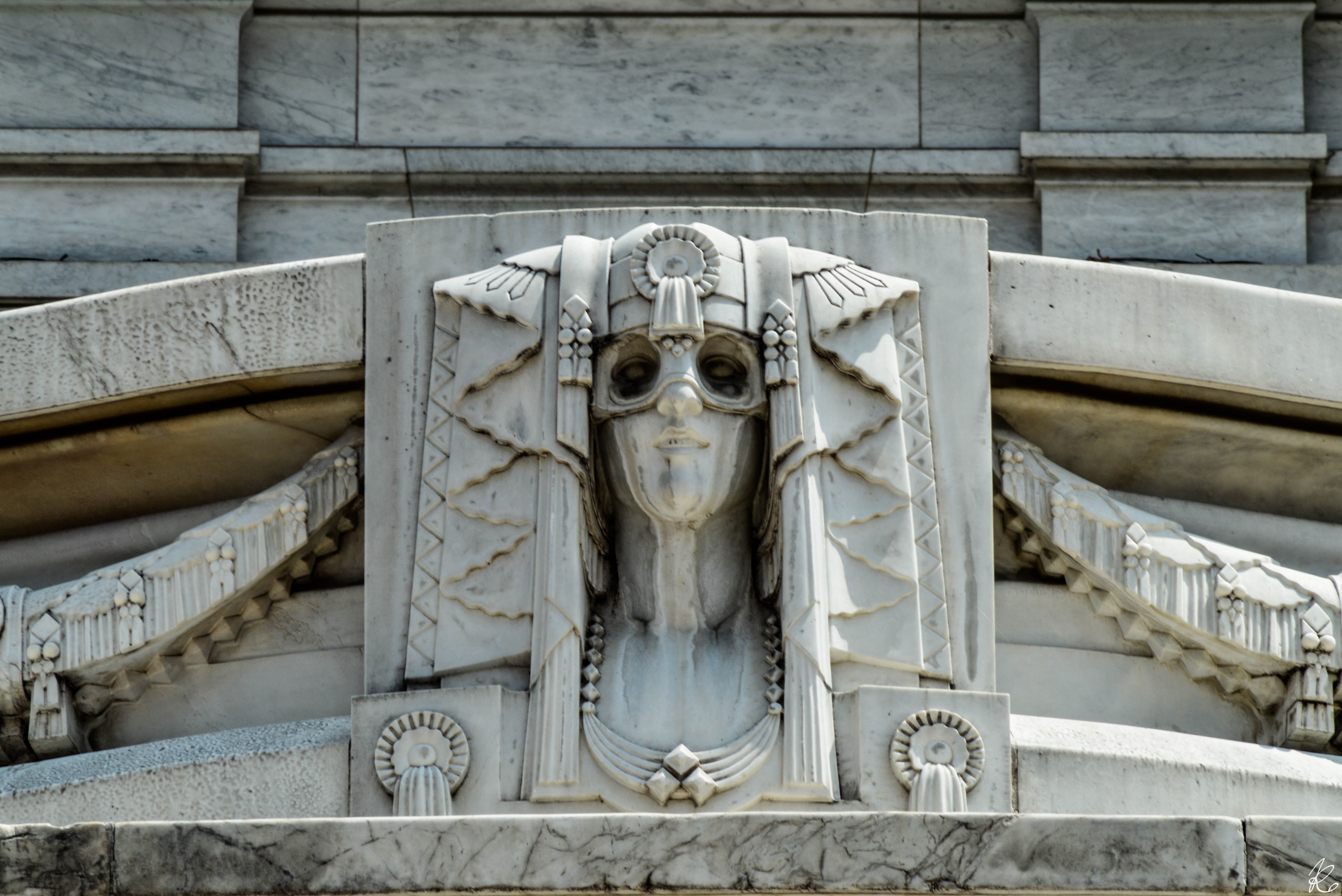
One of the mascarons made by Adamo Boari in the façade of the Palacio de Bellas Artes in Mexico City (1904–1934)

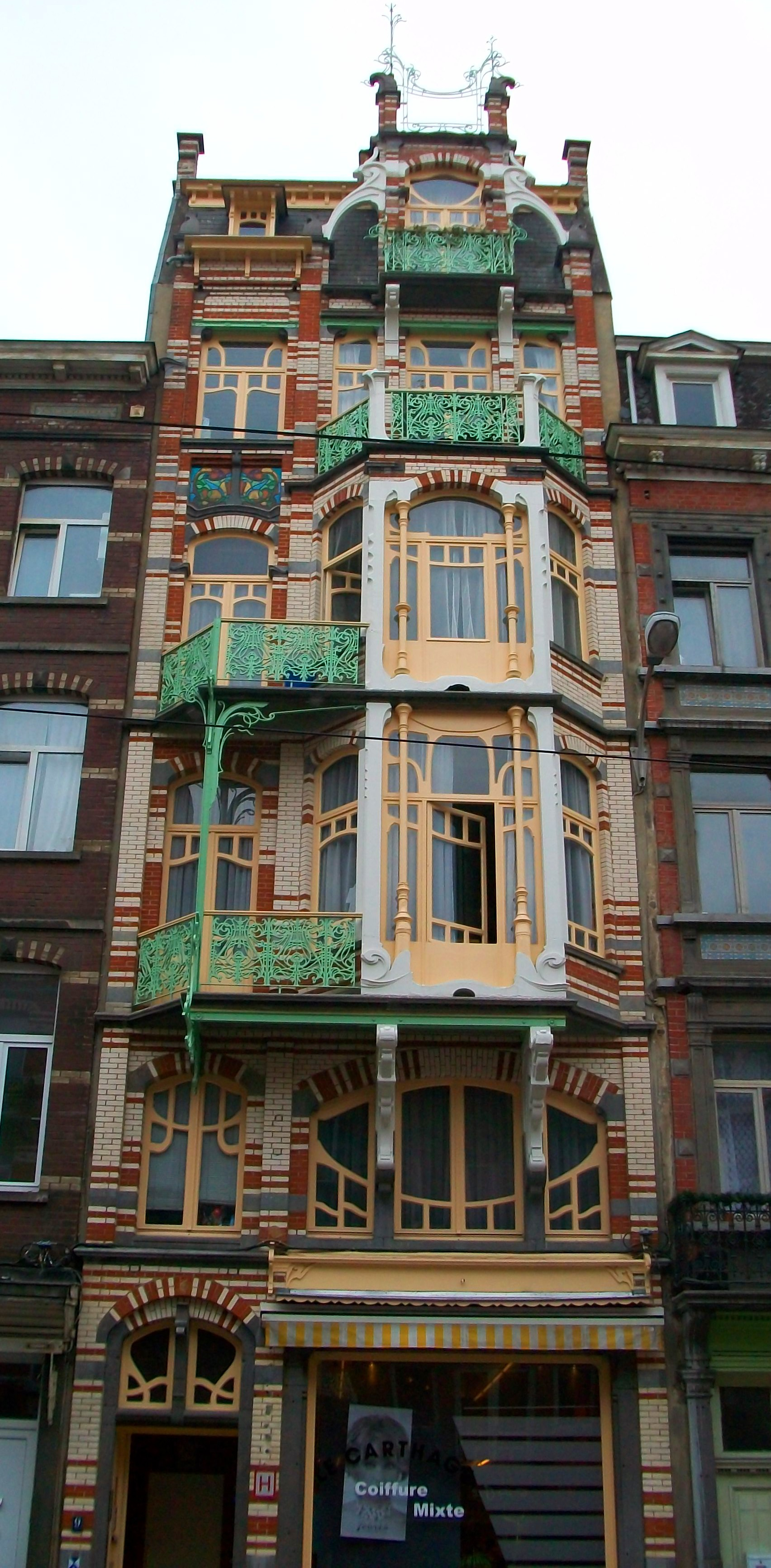
Asymmetric façade with curved lines of De Beck building in Brussels by Gustave Strauven (1905)

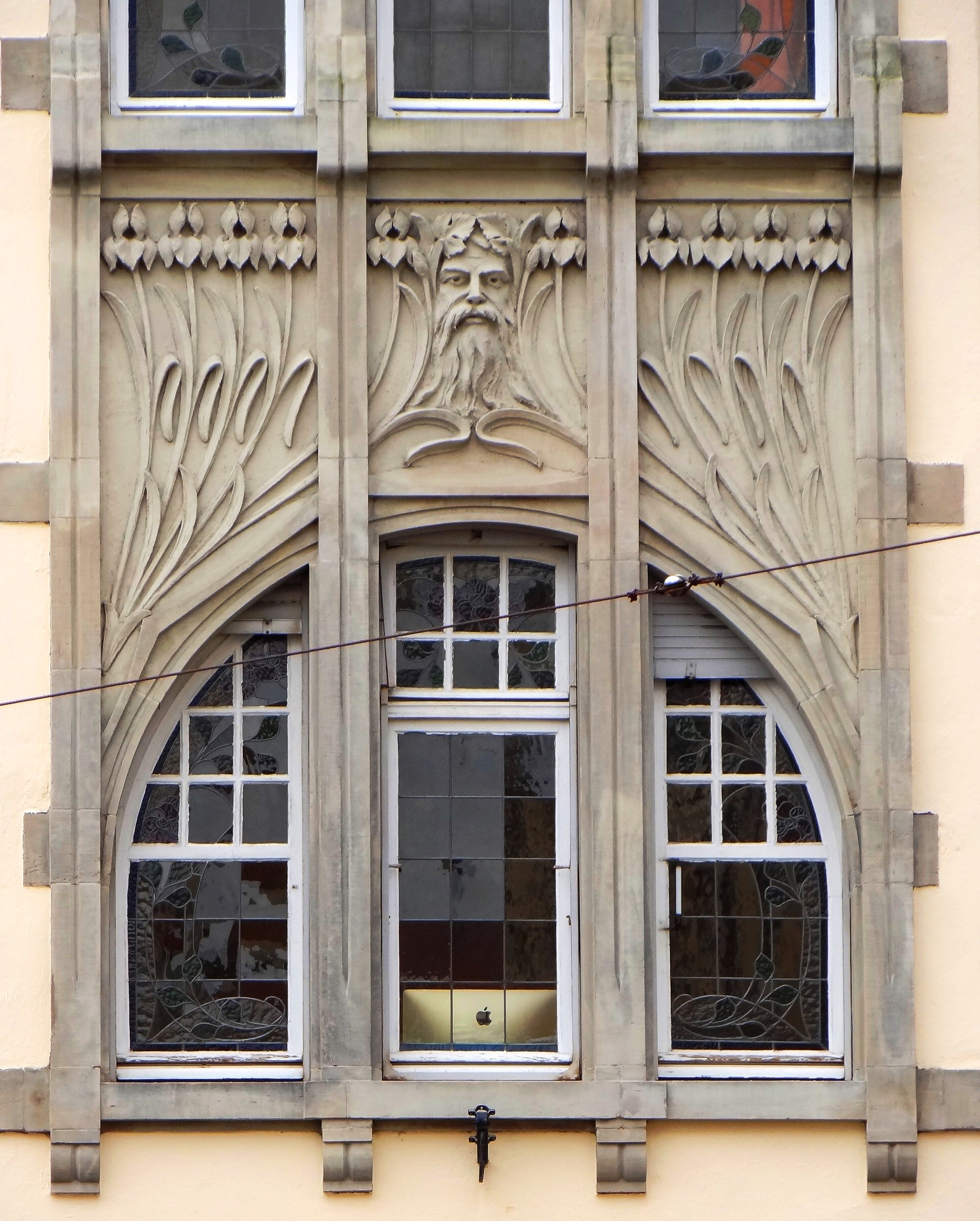
Irises and mascaron at the façade of Schichtel building in Strasbourg, France, by Aloys Walter (1905–06)

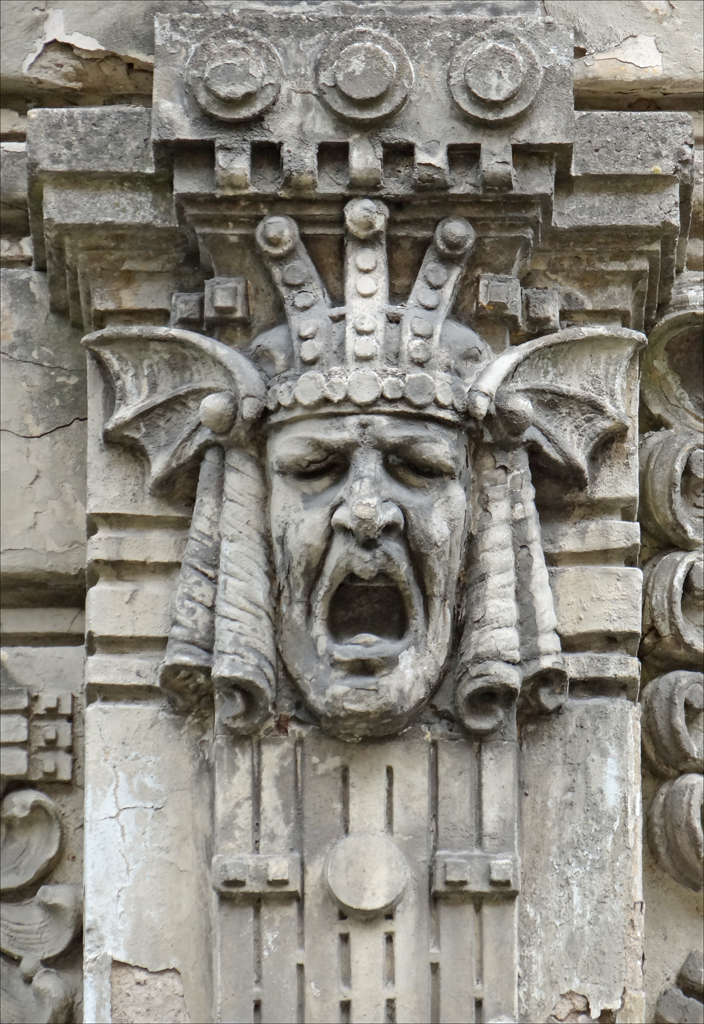
Jugendstil straight-lined mascaron in Riga (1906)

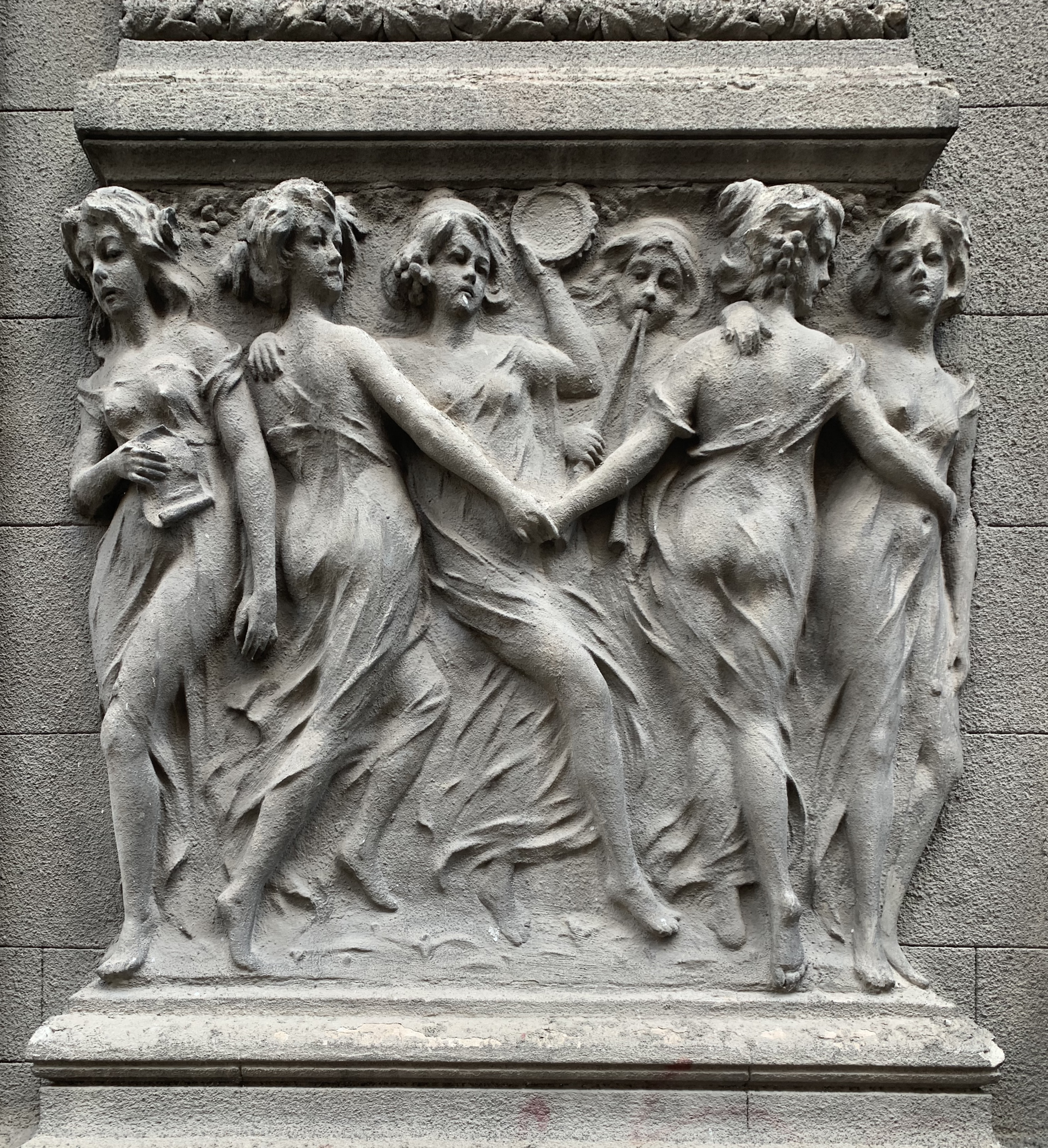
Relief on the façade of the Fanny and Isac Popper House (Strada Sfinților no. 1) in Bucharest, designed by Alfred Popper (1914)

Art Nouveau architecture was a reaction against the eclectic styles that dominated European architecture in the second half of the 19th century. It was expressed through decoration: either ornamental (based on flowers and plants, e.g. thistles, irises, cyclamens, orchids, water lilies etc.) or sculptural (see the respective section below). While faces of people (or mascarons) are referred to ornament, the use of people in different forms of sculpture (statues and reliefs: see the respective section below) was also common in some forms of Art Nouveau. Before Vienna Secession, Jugendstil and the various forms of the National romantic style façades were asymmetrical, and often decorated with polychrome ceramic tiles. The decoration usually suggested movement; there was no distinction between the structure and the ornament. A curling or "whiplash" motif, based on the forms of plants and flowers, was widely used in the early Art Nouveau, but decoration became more abstract and symmetrical in Vienna Secession and other later versions of the style, as in the Stoclet Palace in Brussels (1905–1911).

The style first appeared in Brussels' Hankar House by Paul Hankar (1893) and Hôtel Tassel (1892–93) of Victor Horta. The Hôtel Tassel was visited by Hector Guimard, who used the same style in his first major work, the Castel Béranger (1897–98). Horta and Guimard also designed the furniture and the interior decoration, down to the doorknobs and carpeting. In 1899, based on the fame of the Castel Béranger, Guimard received a commission to design the entrances of the stations of the new Paris Métro, which opened in 1900. Though few of the originals survived, these became the symbol of the Art Nouveau movement in Paris.

In Paris, the architectural style was also a reaction to the strict regulations imposed on building façades by Georges-Eugène Haussmann, the prefect of Paris under Napoleon III. Bow windows were finally allowed in 1903, and Art Nouveau architects went to the opposite extreme, most notably in the houses of Jules Lavirotte, which were essentially large works of sculpture, completely covered with decoration. An important neighbourhood of Art Nouveau houses appeared in the French city of Nancy, around the Villa Majorelle (1901–02), the residence of the furniture designer Louis Majorelle. It was designed by Henri Sauvage as a showcase for Majorelle's furniture designs.

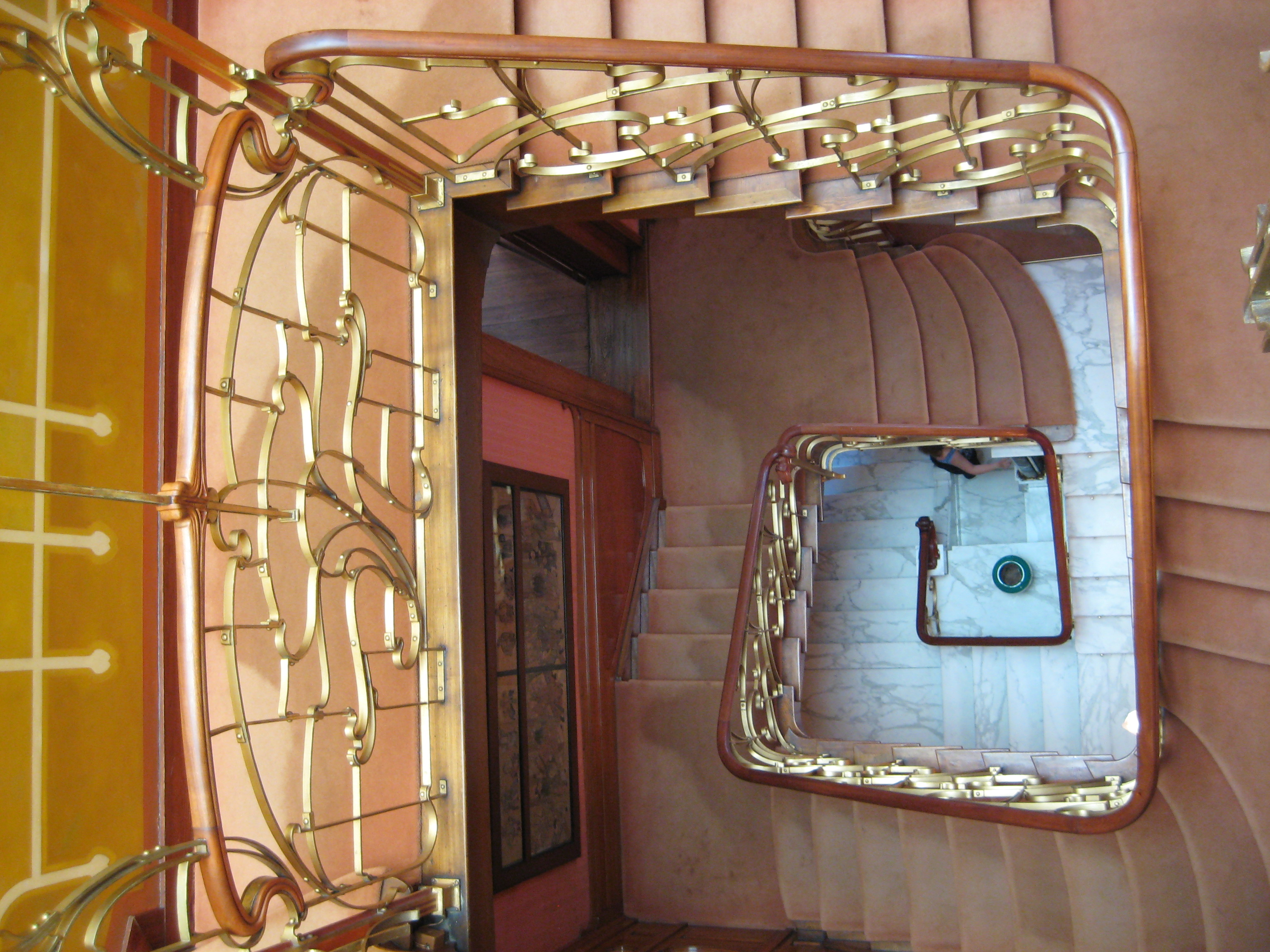
Spiral staircase in Maison and Atelier Horta in Brussels by Victor Horta (1898–1901)

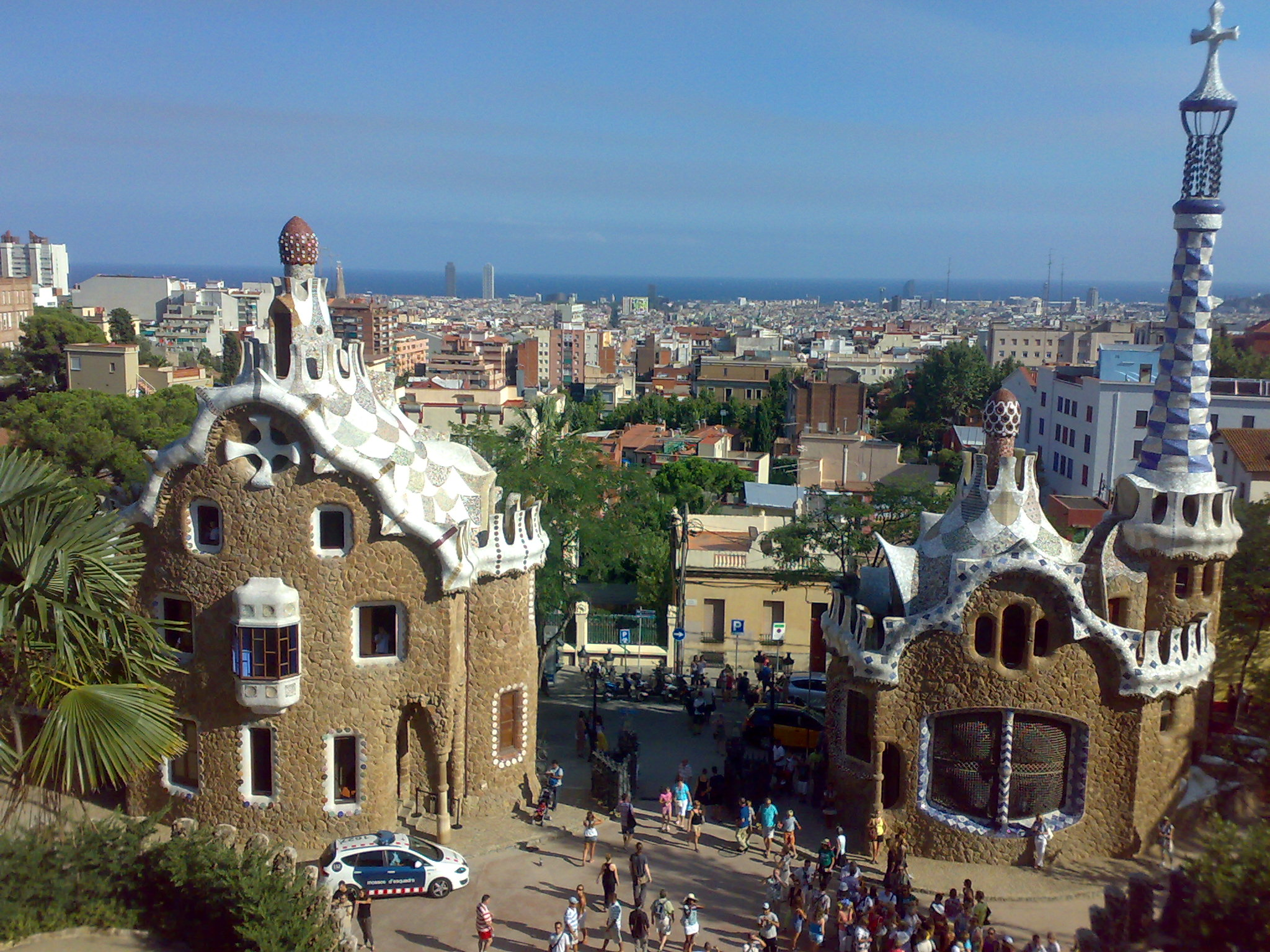
Entrance buildings in Parc Güell, Barcelona, by Antoni Gaudí (1900–1914)

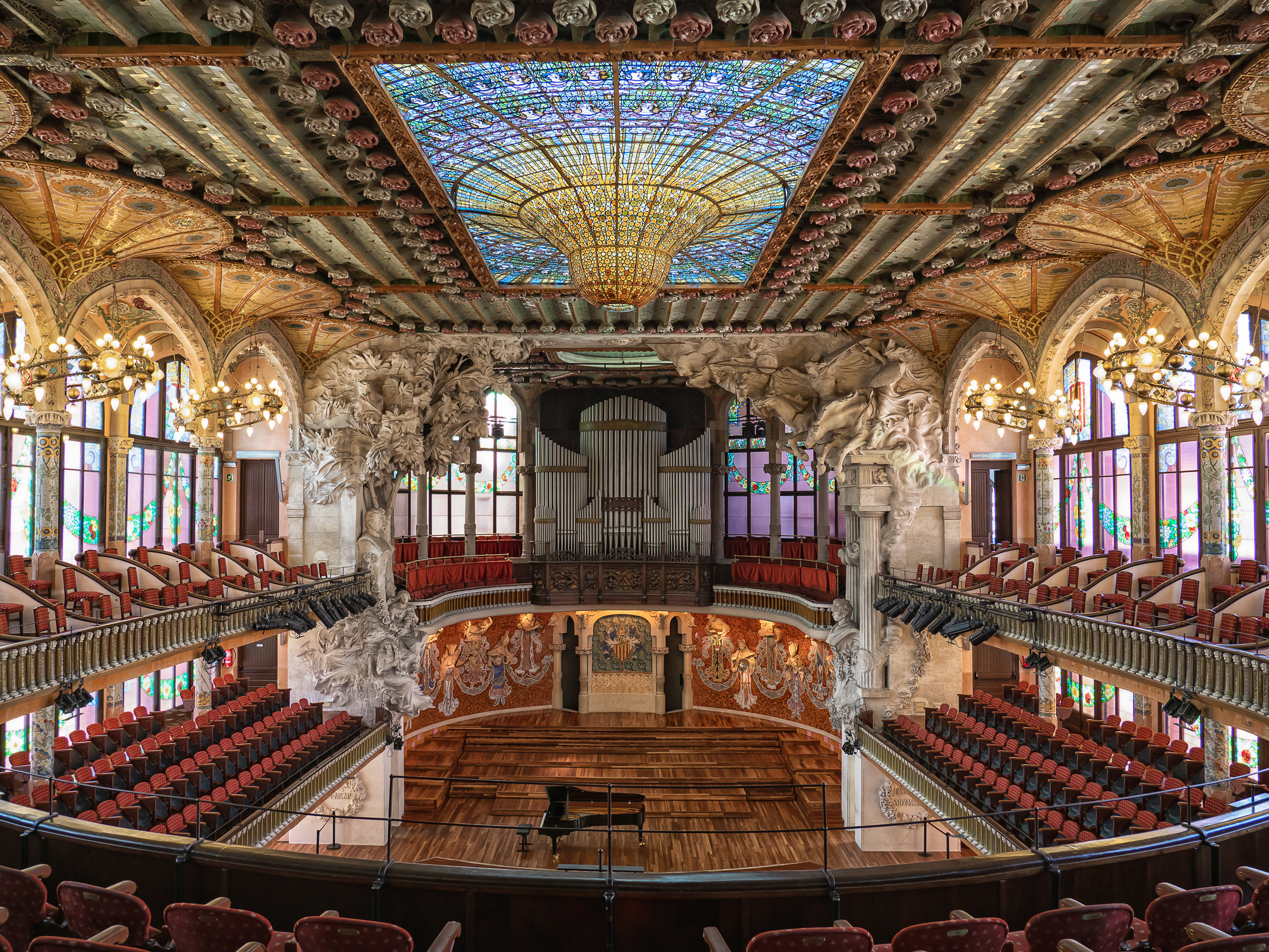
Interior of Palau de la Música Catalana in Barcelona (1905–1909)

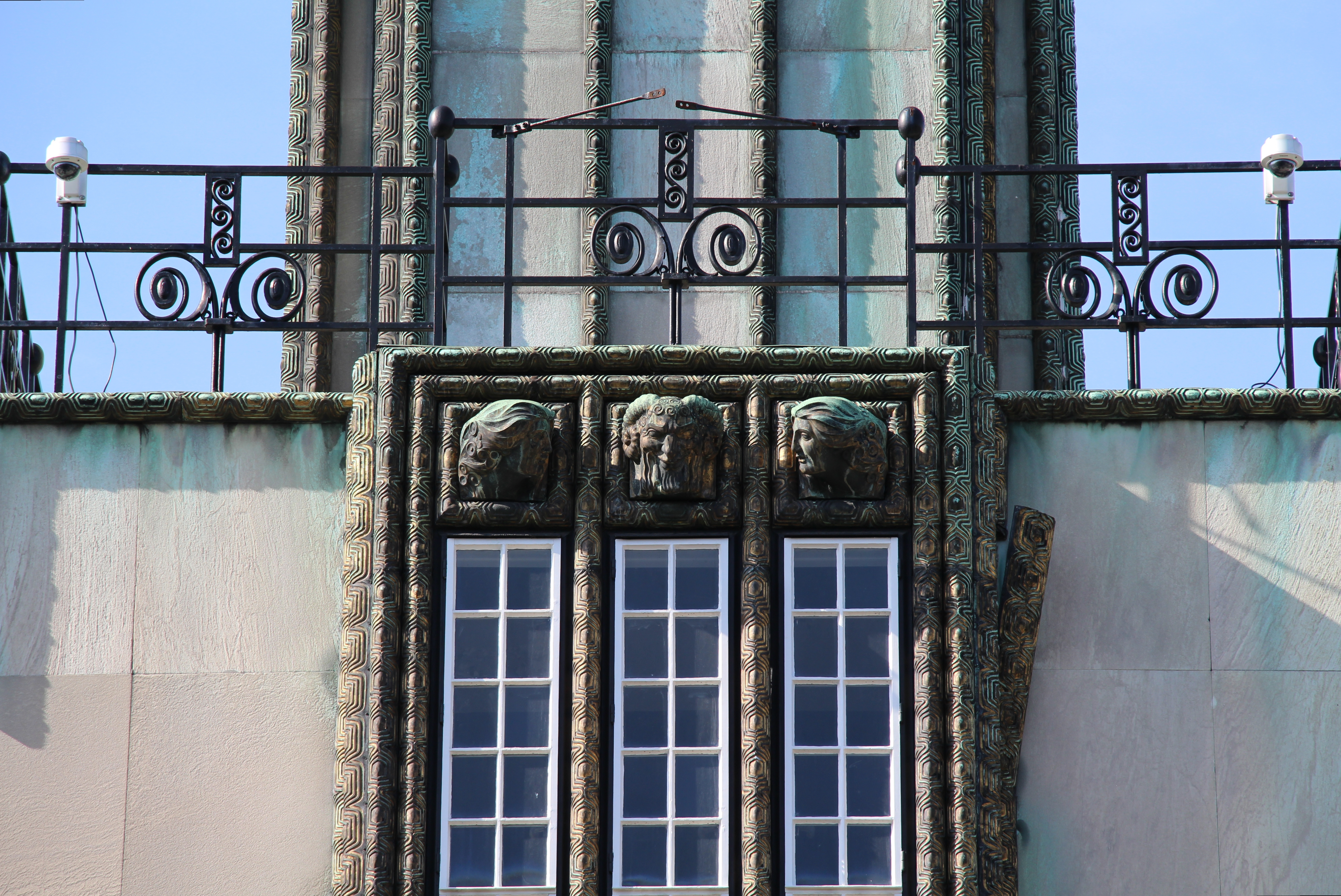
Detail of the Stoclet Palace in Brussels (1905–1911)

Many Art Nouveau buildings were included in UNESCO World Cultural Heritage list as a part of their city centres (in Bern, Budapest, Lviv, Paris, Porto, Prague, Riga, Saint Petersburg, Strasbourg (Neustadt), Vienna). Along with them, there were buildings that were included in the list as separate objects:

- Belgium: the works of Victor Horta (Hôtel Tassel, Hôtel Solvay, Hôtel van Eetvelde, Maison and Atelier Horta) and the Stoclet Palace by Josef Hoffmann in Brussels;
- Spain: the works of Lluís Domènech i Montaner (Palau de la Música Catalana and Hospital de Sant Pau in Barcelona), and the works of Antoni Gaudí (Park Güell, Palau Güell, Sagrada Família, Casa Batlló, Casa Milá, Casa Vicens in Barcelona; Colònia Güell in Santa Coloma de Cervelló).

=== Sculpture ===
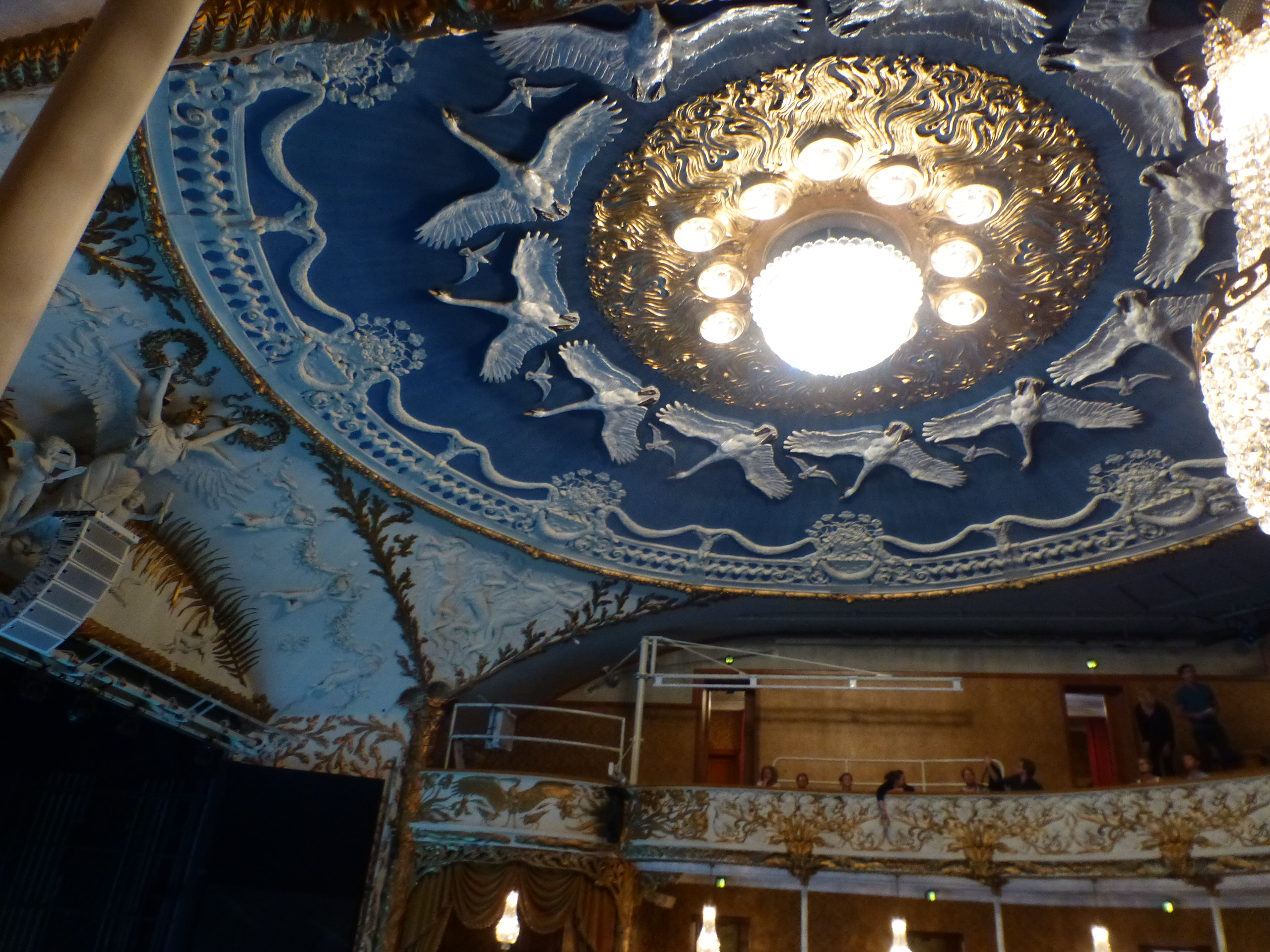
High-relief of swans and statues in the interior of Aarhus Theatre, Denmark, by Karl Hansen Reistrup (1897–1900)

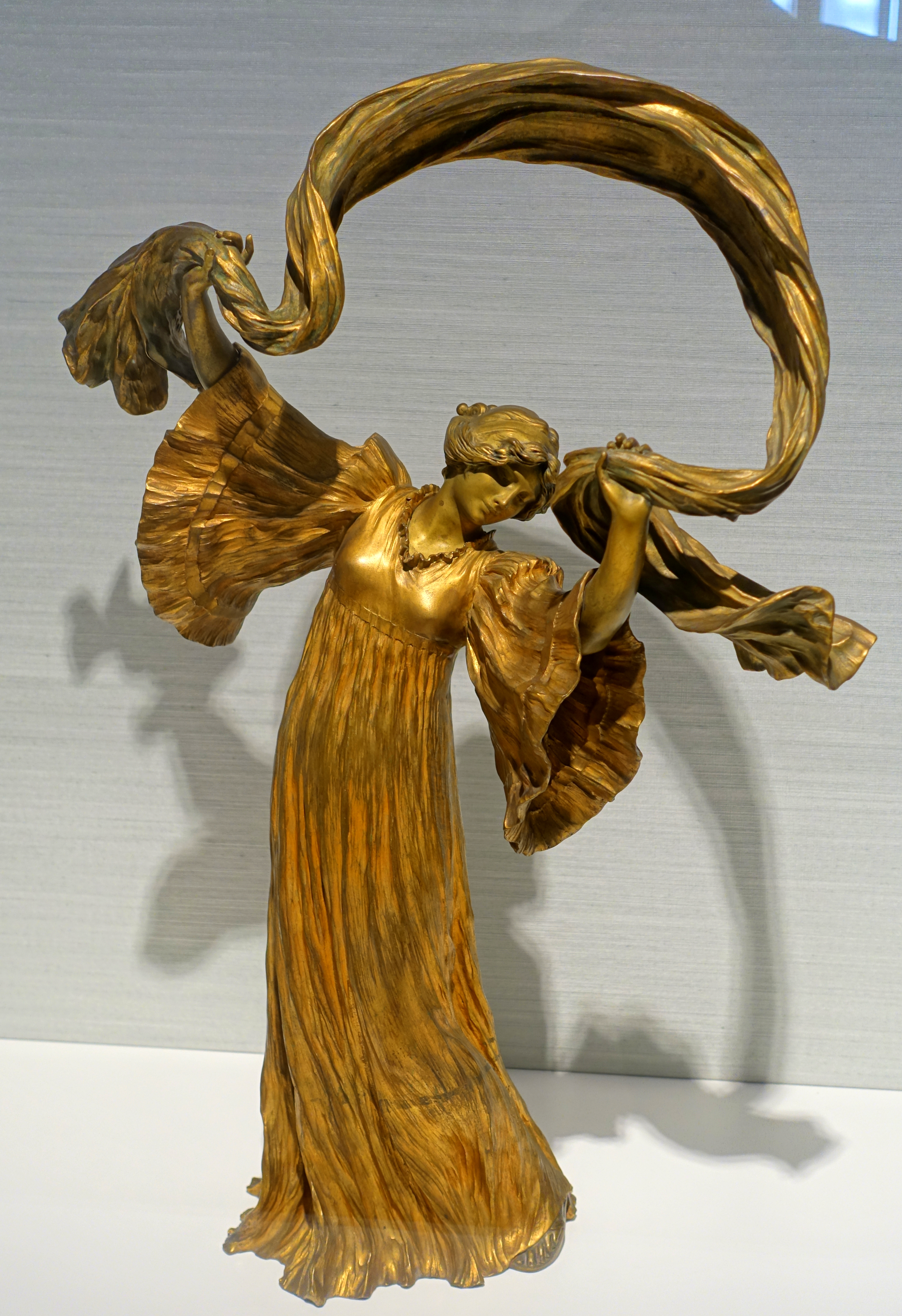
Dancer with a Scarf, made for the Manufacture nationale de Sèvres, France, by Agathon Léonard (1898)

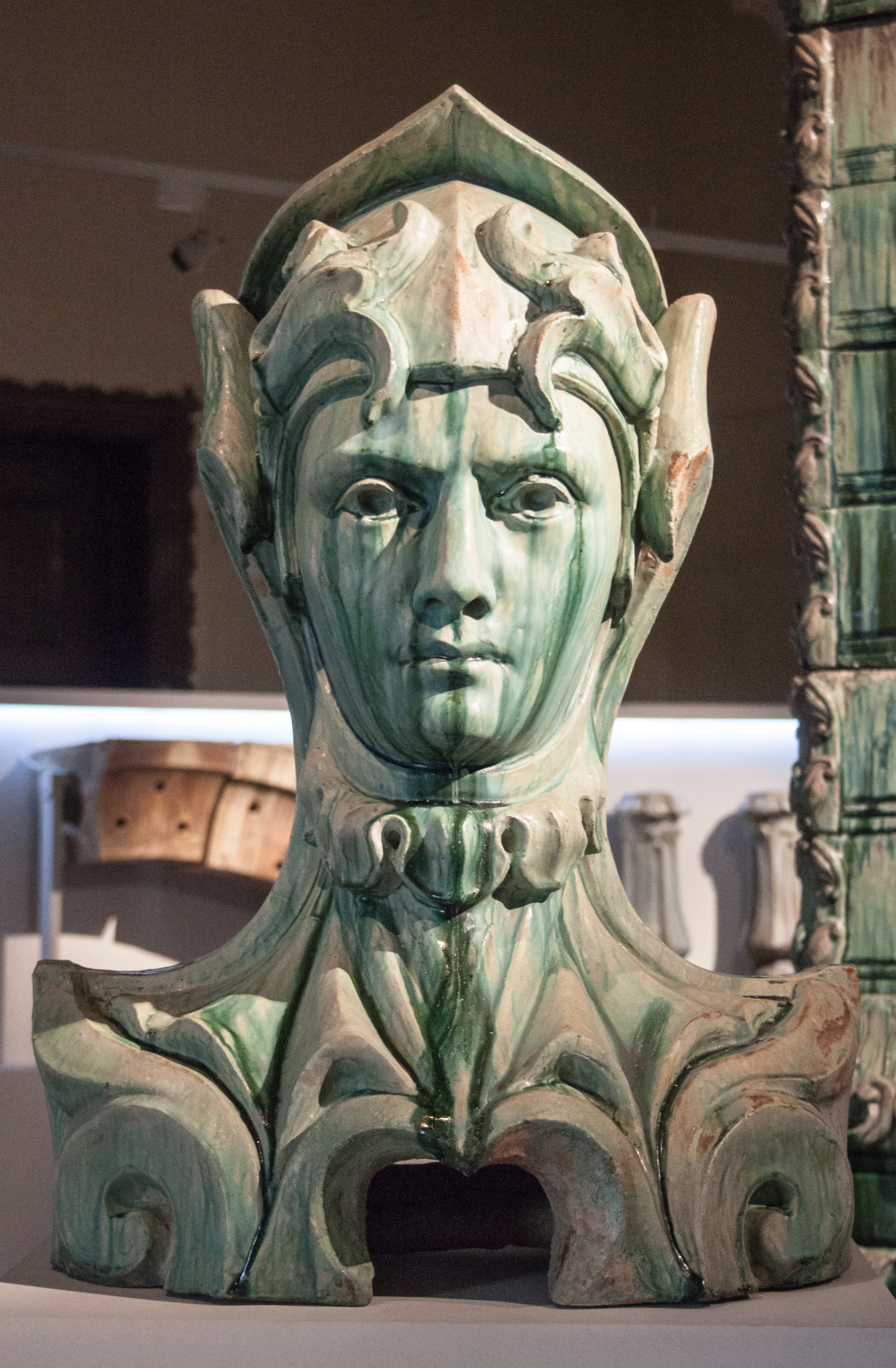
Bust decorating the balconies of 29 avenue Rapp, Paris, by Alexandre Bigot and Jean-Baptiste Larrivé (1901)

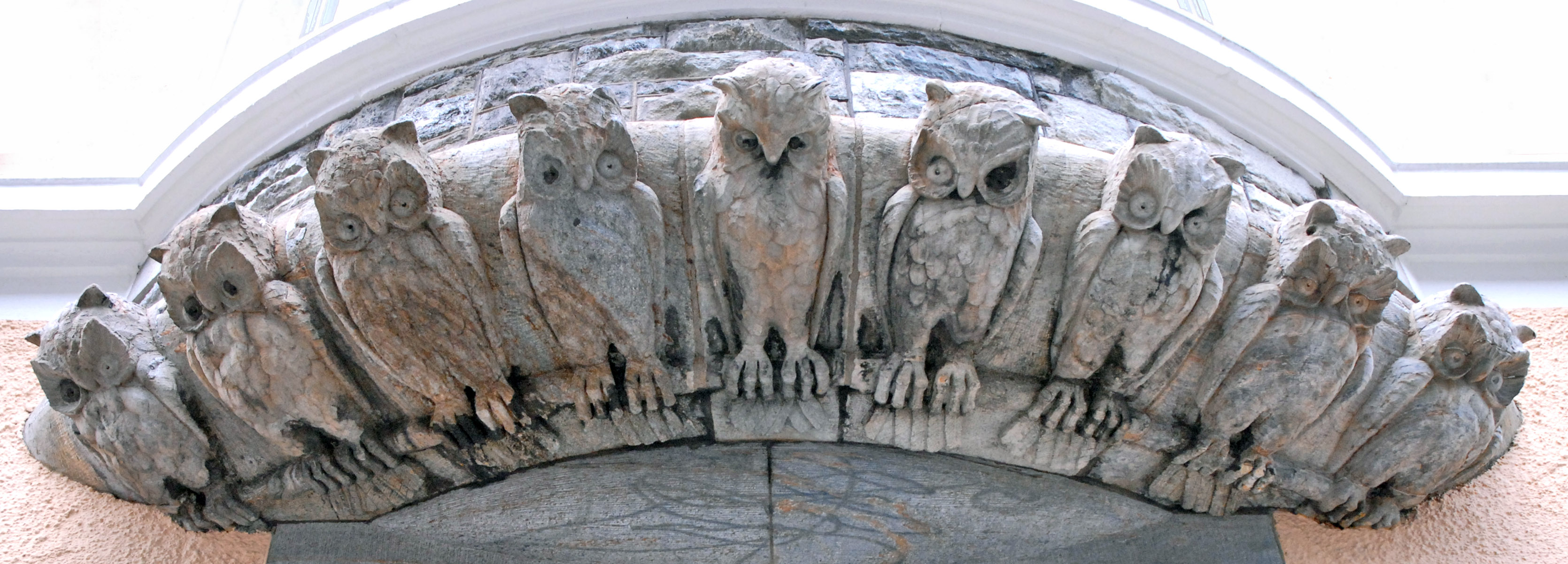
High-relief of owls in Katajanokka (Helsinki) by Georg Wasastjerna (1903)

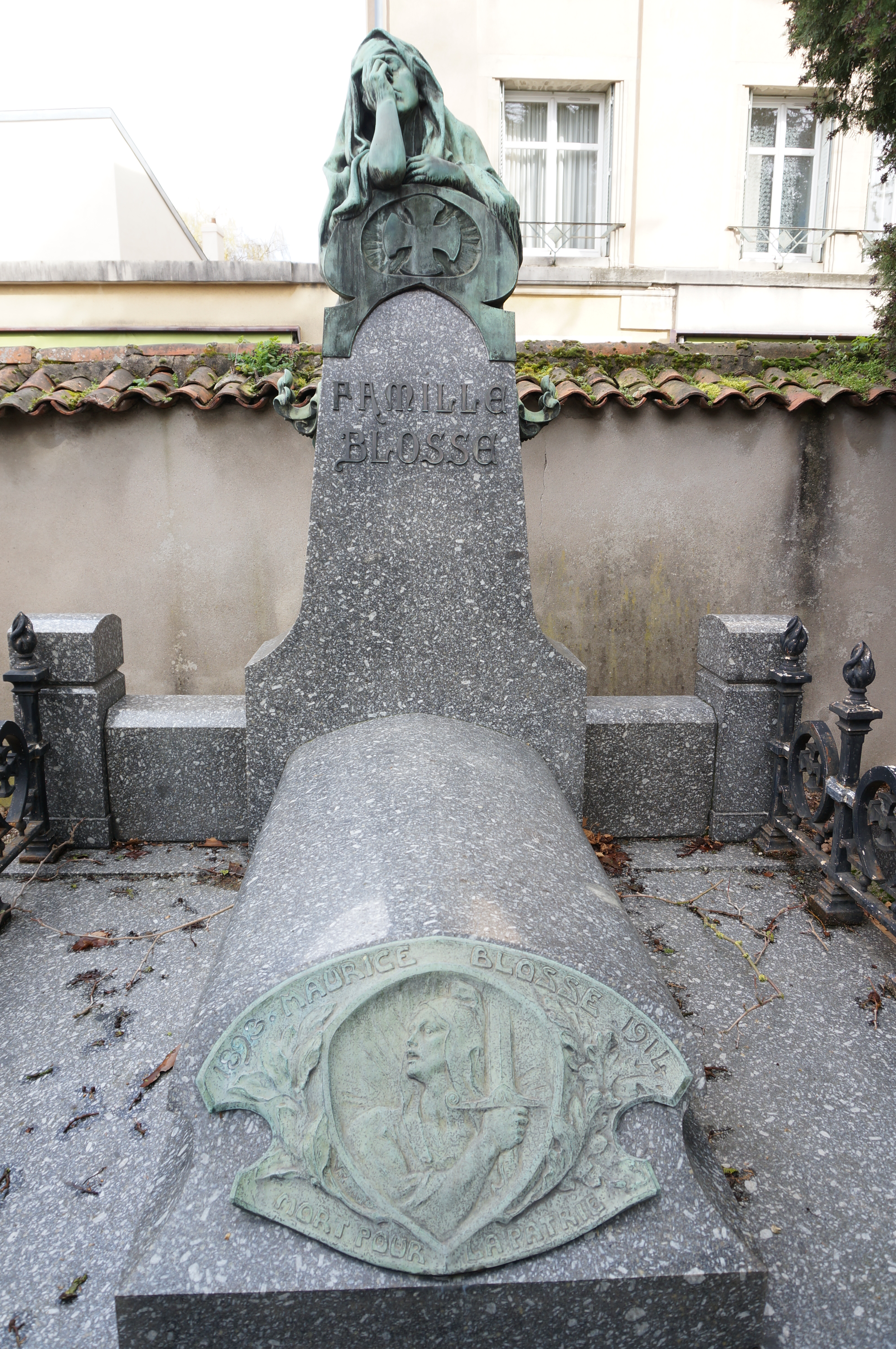
Sculpture in Nancy, France, by Ernest Bussière

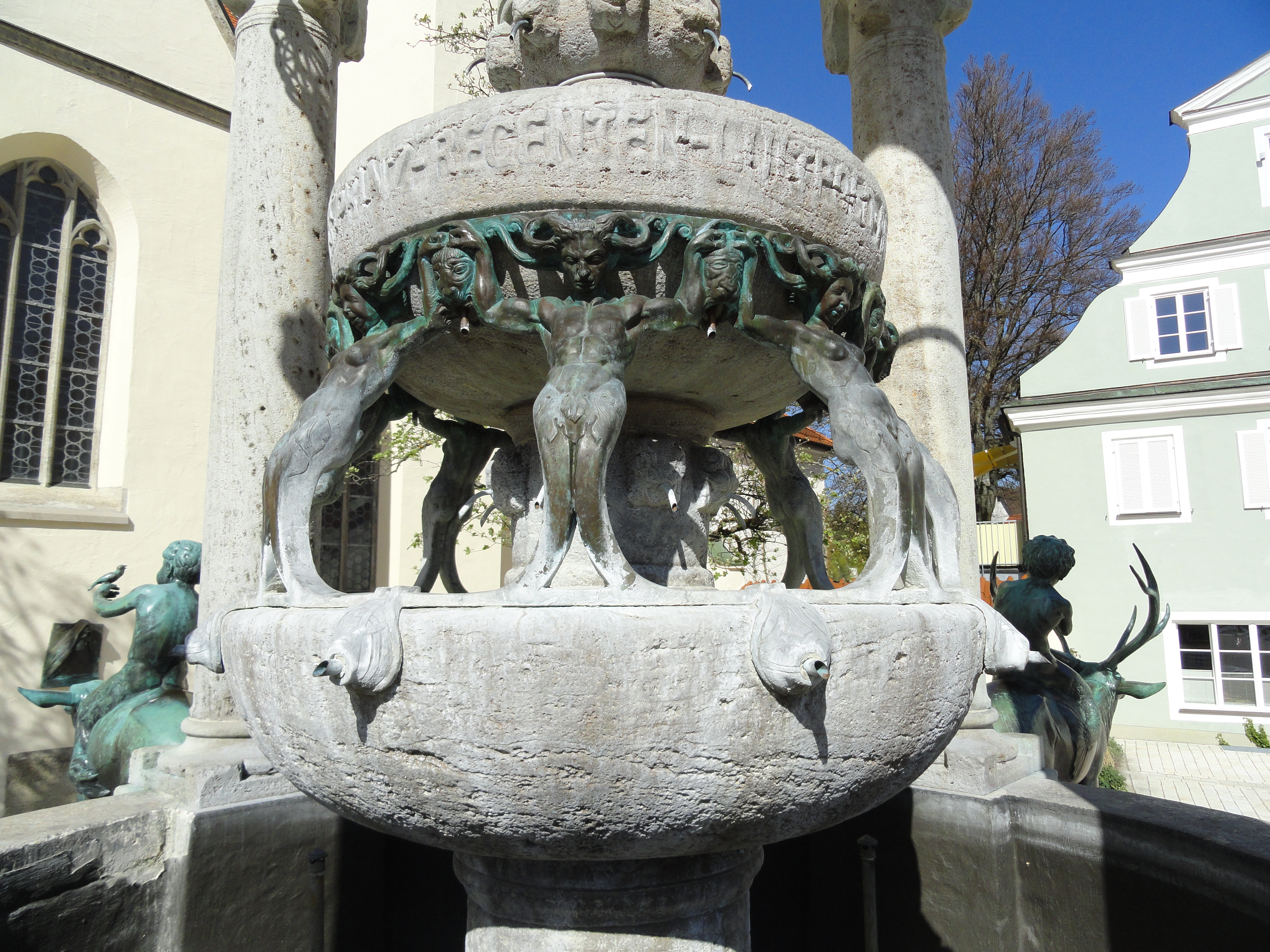
Atlantes, caryatids at Sankt-Mang-Brunnen in Kempten, Germany, by Georg Wrba (1905)

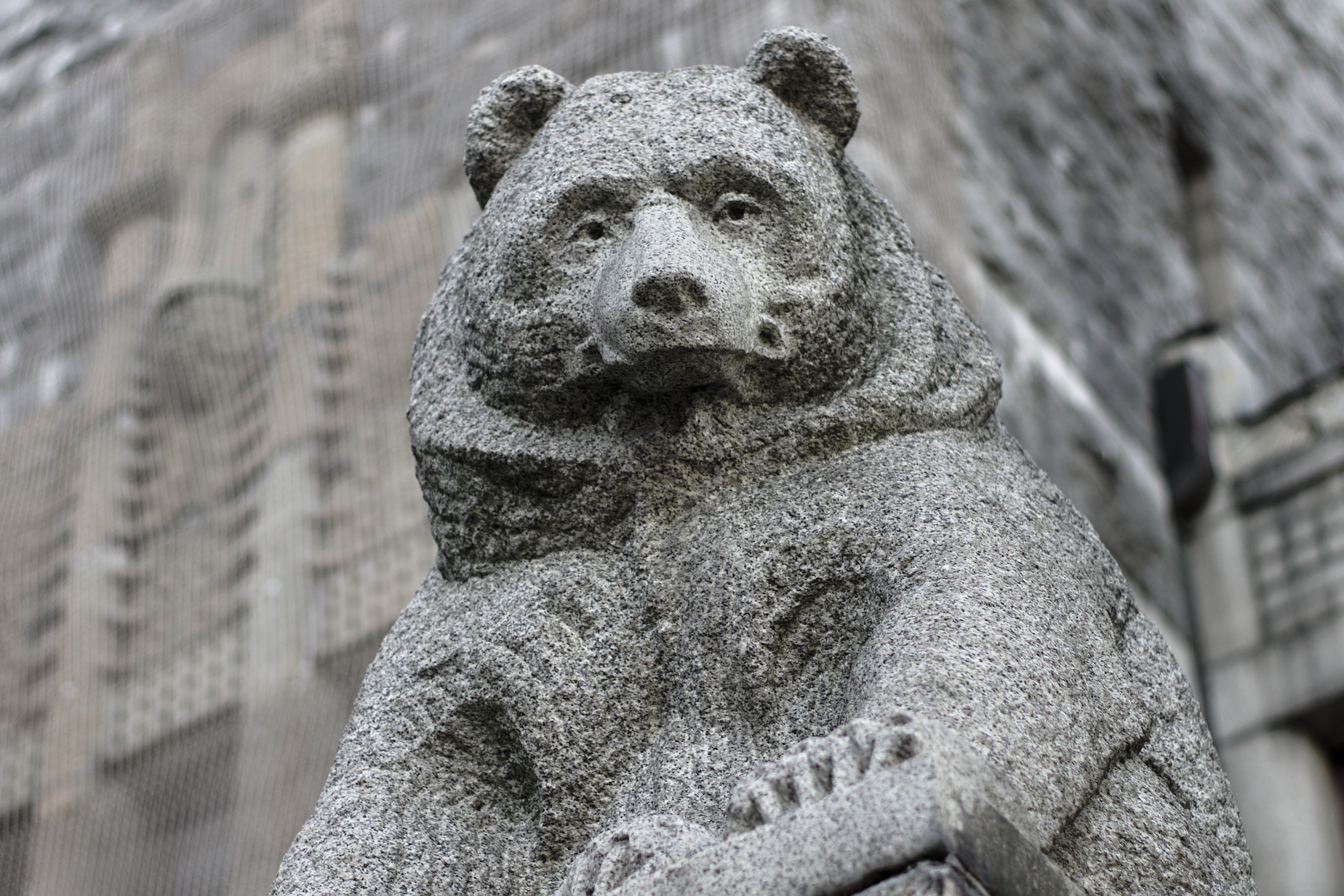
Bear statue at the National Museum of Finland in Helsinki by Emil Wikström (1905–1910)

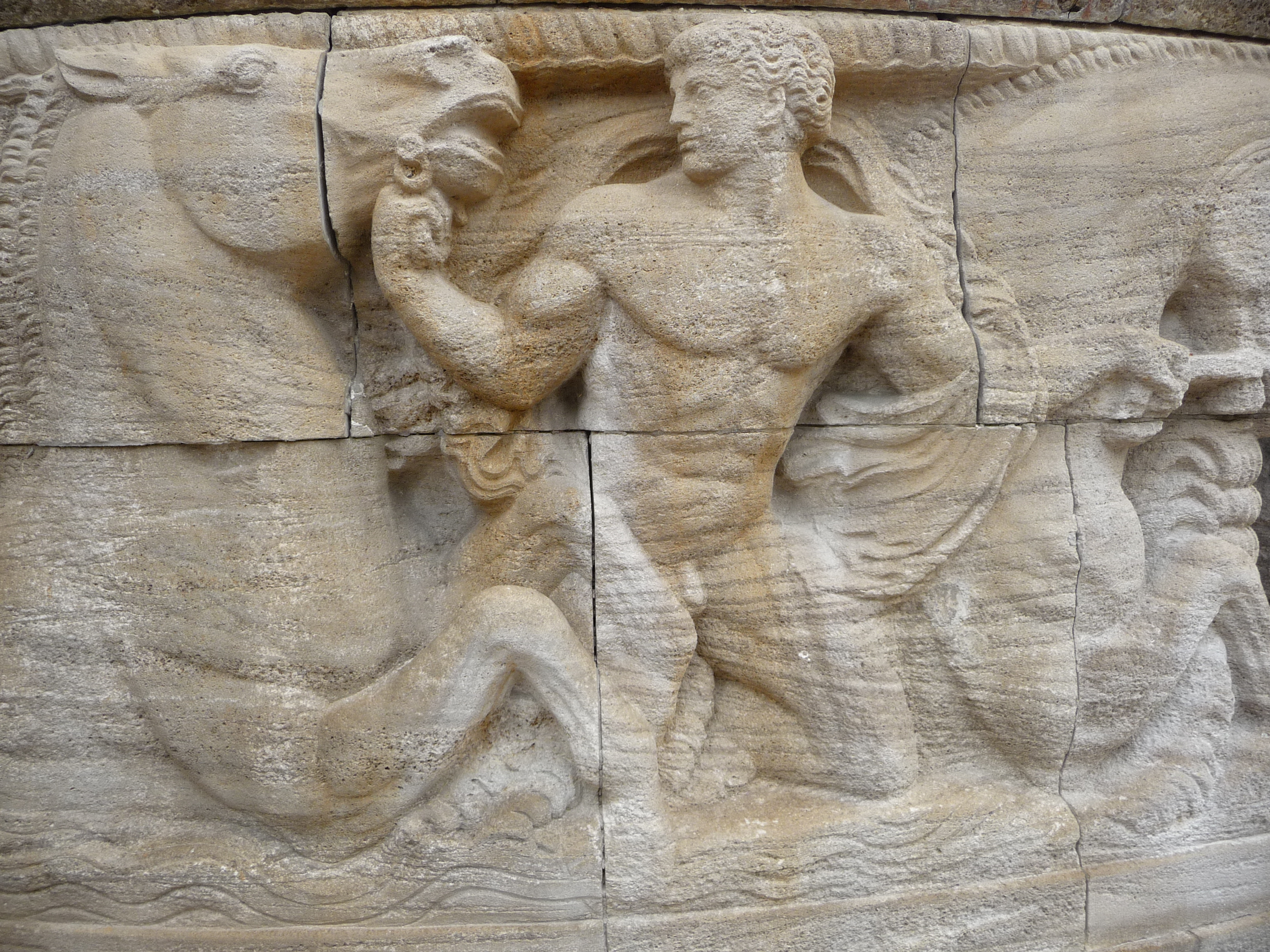
Bas-relief in Sprudelhof, Bad Nauheim, Germany, by Heinrich Jobst (1905–1911)

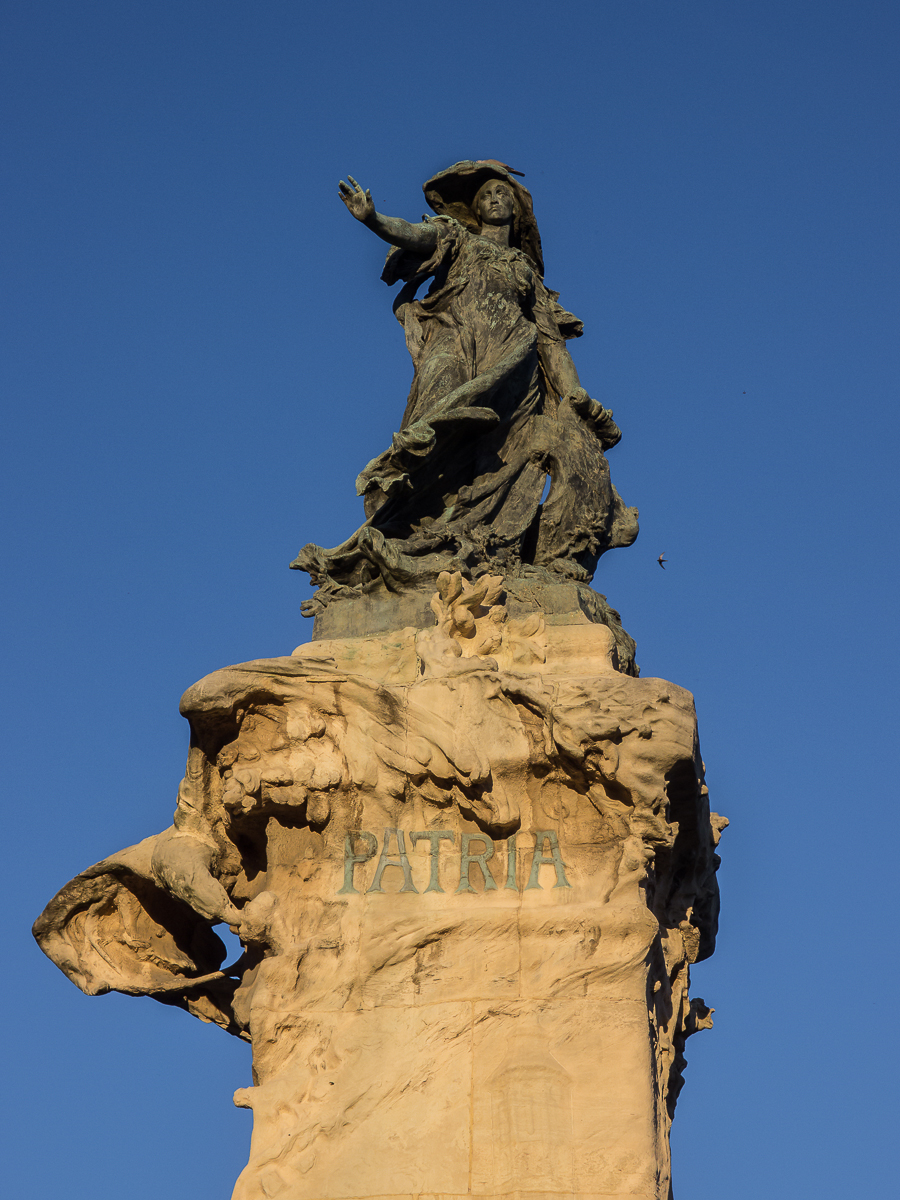
Monument to Siege of Zaragoza by Agustí Querol Subirats (1908)

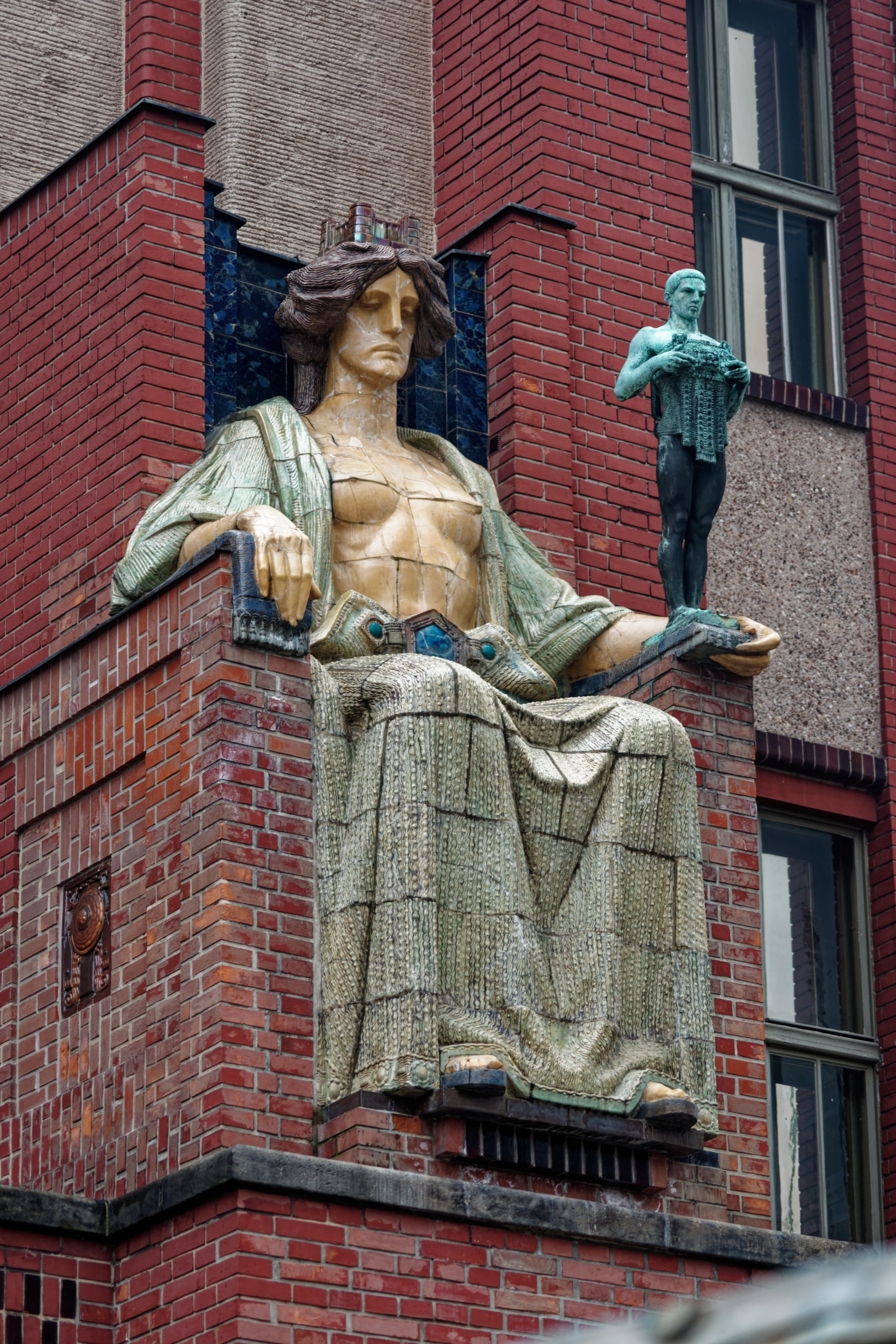
Ceramic relief and statue in Hradec Králové, Czech Republic, by Stanislav Sucharda (1909–1912)

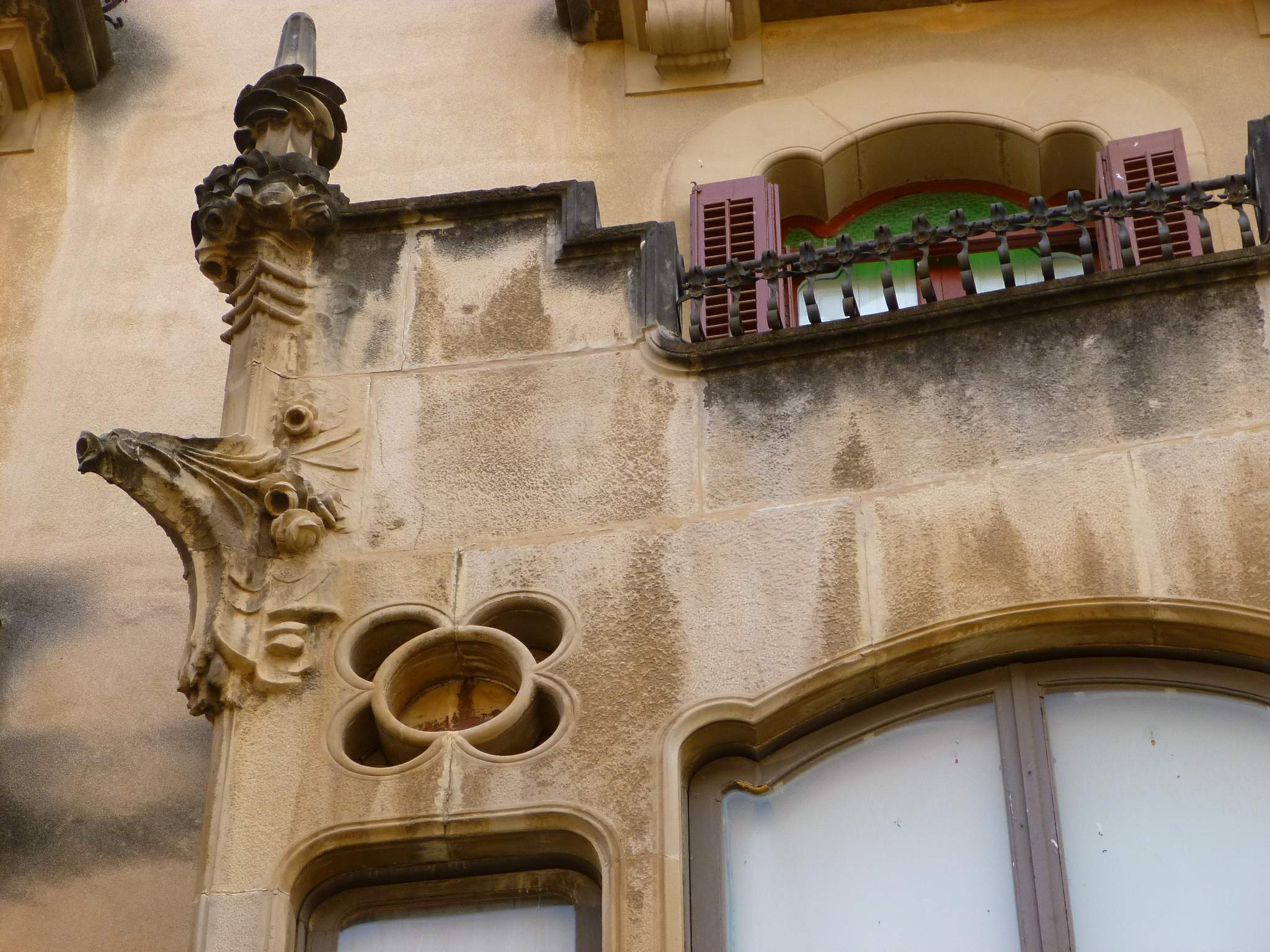
Gargoyle in Tortosa, Catalonia, Spain, by Josep Plantada i Artiga (1915)

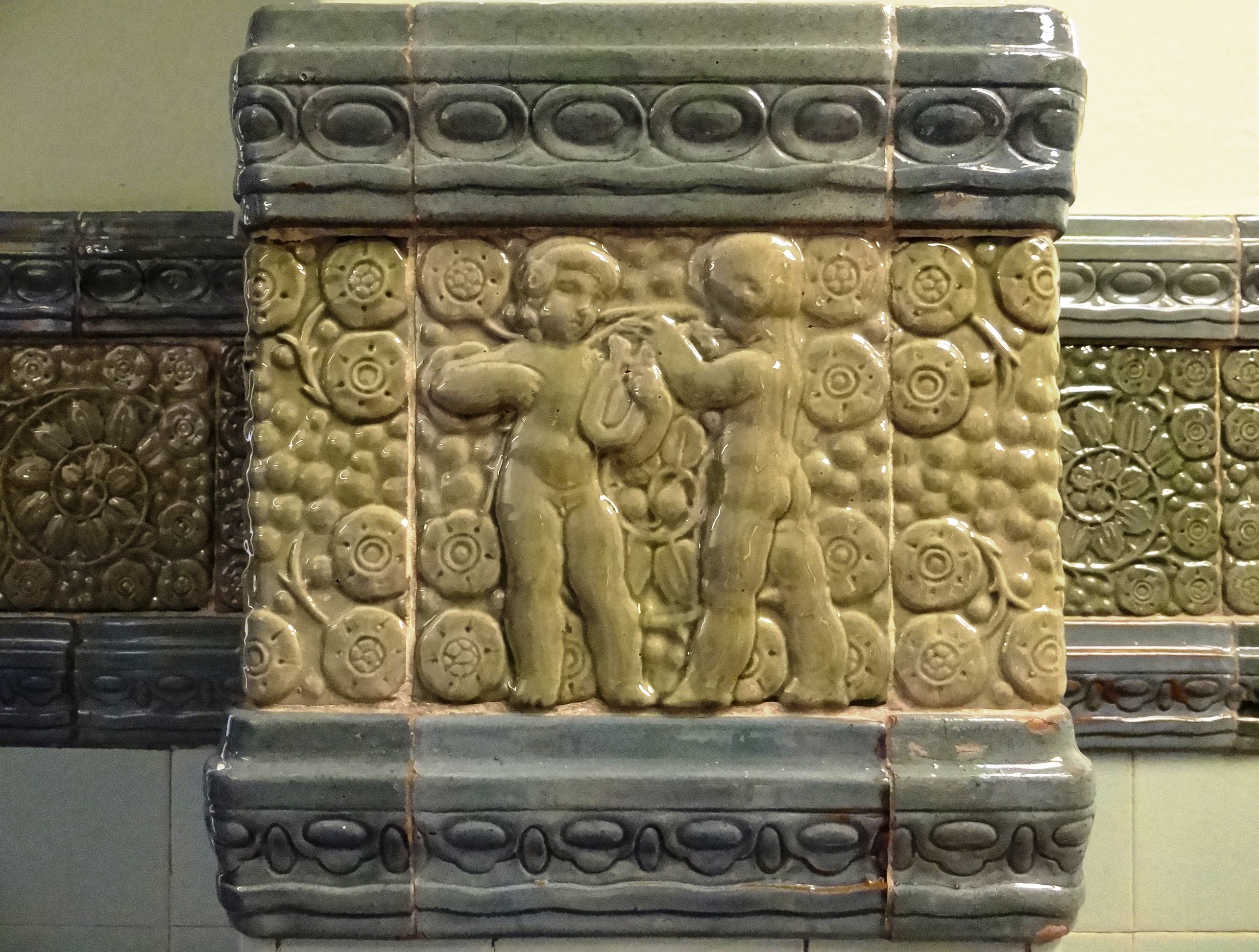
Ceramic putti in the Municipal Music Conservatory of Barcelona by Eusebi Arnau (1916–1928)

Sculpture was another form of expression for Art Nouveau artists, crossing with ceramics sometimes. The porcelain figurine Dancer with a Scarf by Agathon Léonard won recognition both in ceramics and in sculpture at the Paris Exposition in 1900. Sculptors of other countries also created ceramic sculptures: Bohemian Stanislav Sucharda and Ladislav Šaloun, Belgian Charles Van der Stappen and Catalan Lambert Escaler, who created statues of polychrome terracotta. Another notable sculptor of that time was Agustí Querol Subirats from Catalonia who created statues in Spain, Mexico, Argentina, and Cuba.

In architectural sculpture not only statues but also reliefs were used. Art Nouveau architects and sculptors found inspiration in animal motifs (butterflies, peacocks, swans, owls, bats, dragons, bears). Atlantes, caryatids, putti, and gargoyles were also used.

=== Furniture ===
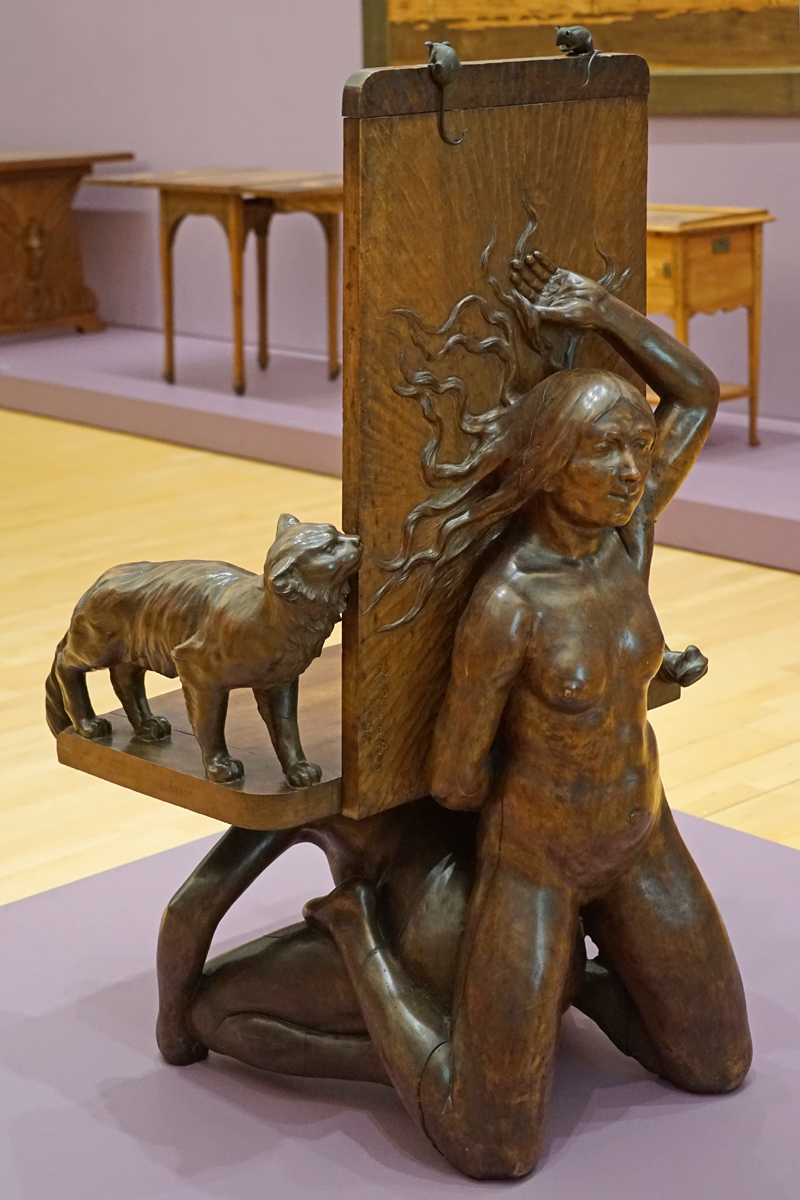
Chair by Rupert Carabin (1895)

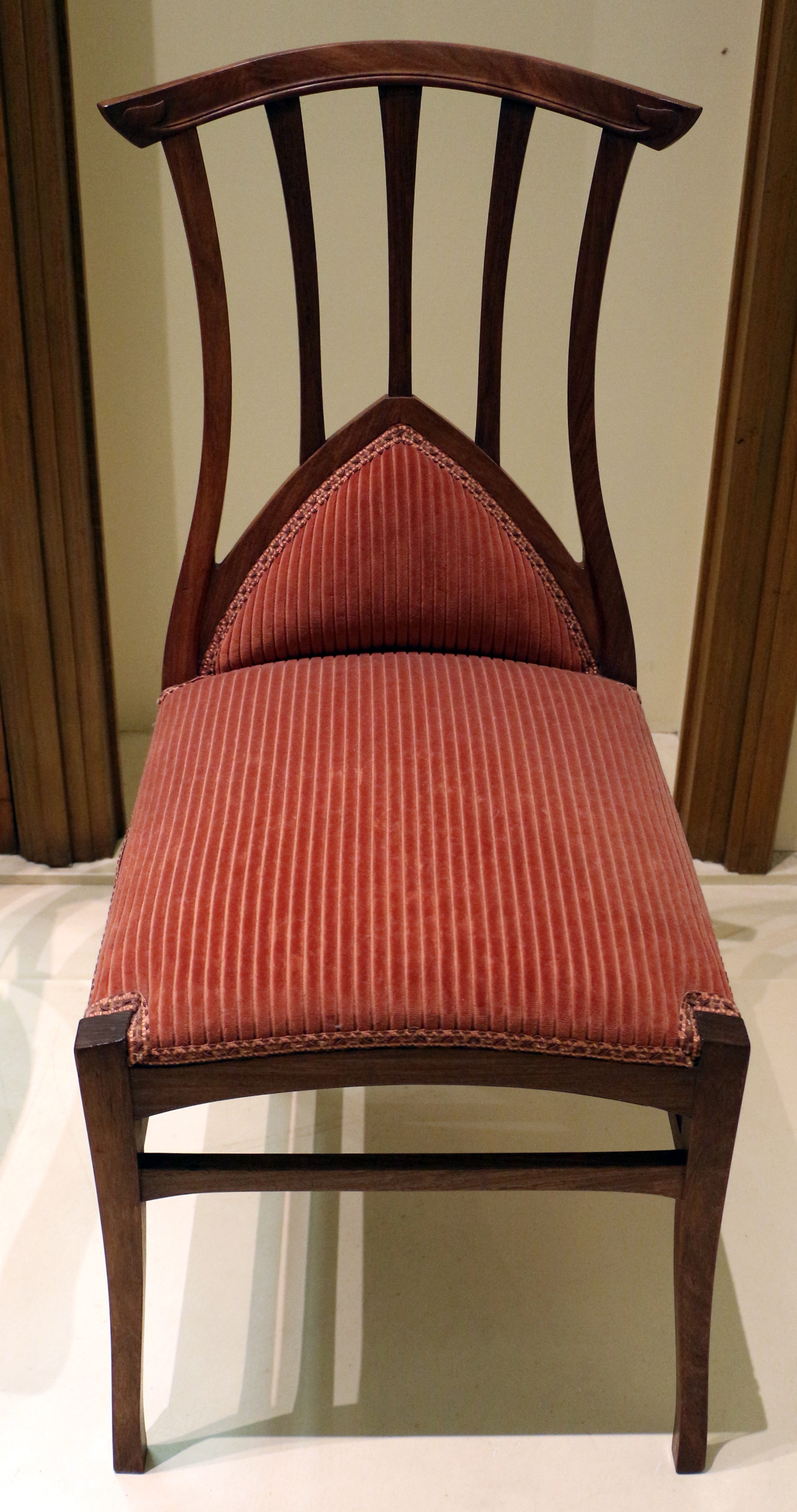
Chair by Henry van de Velde (1896)

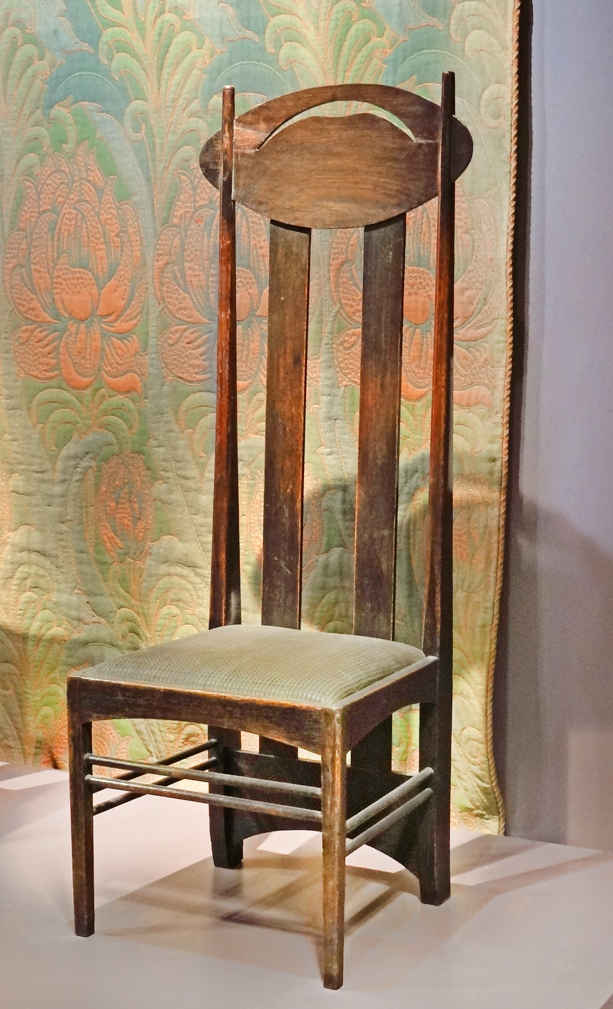
Chair by Charles Rennie Mackintosh (1897–1900)

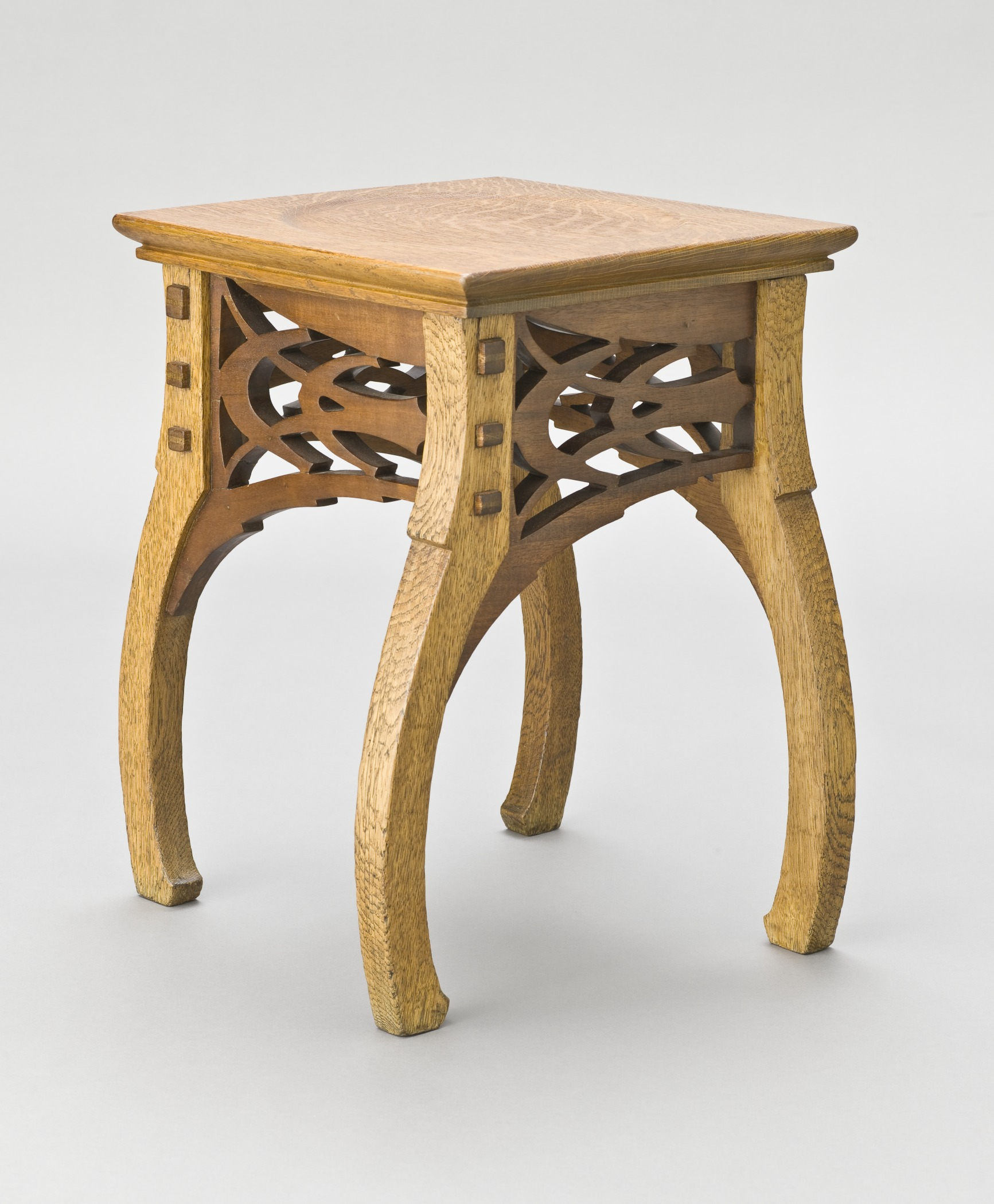
Stool by Paul Hankar (1898)

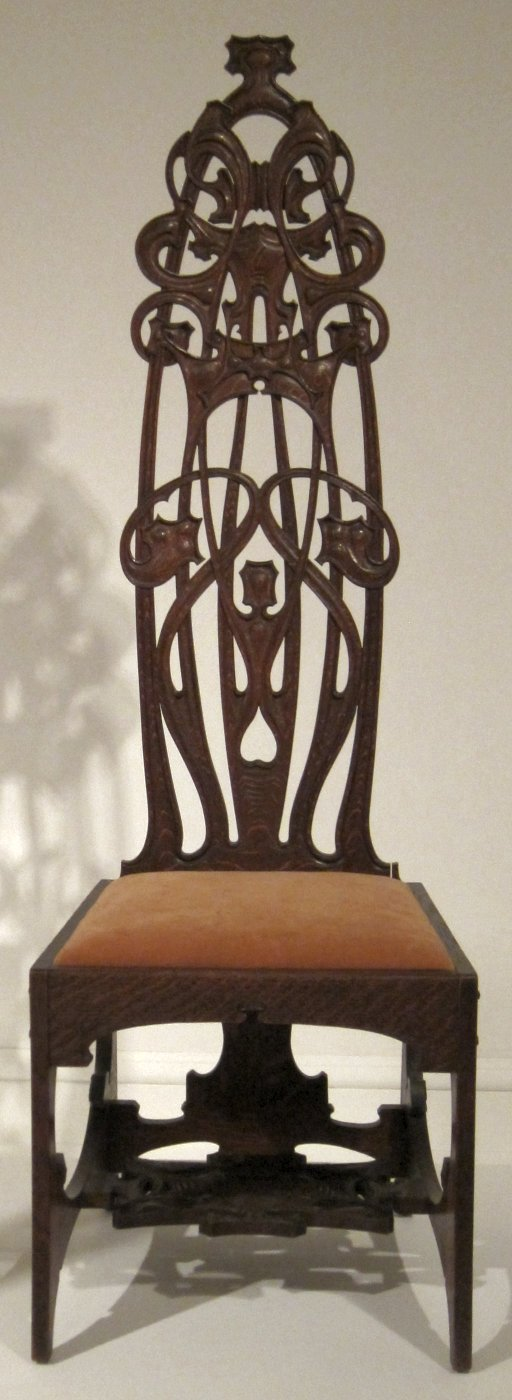
Chair by Charles Rohlfs (1898–99)

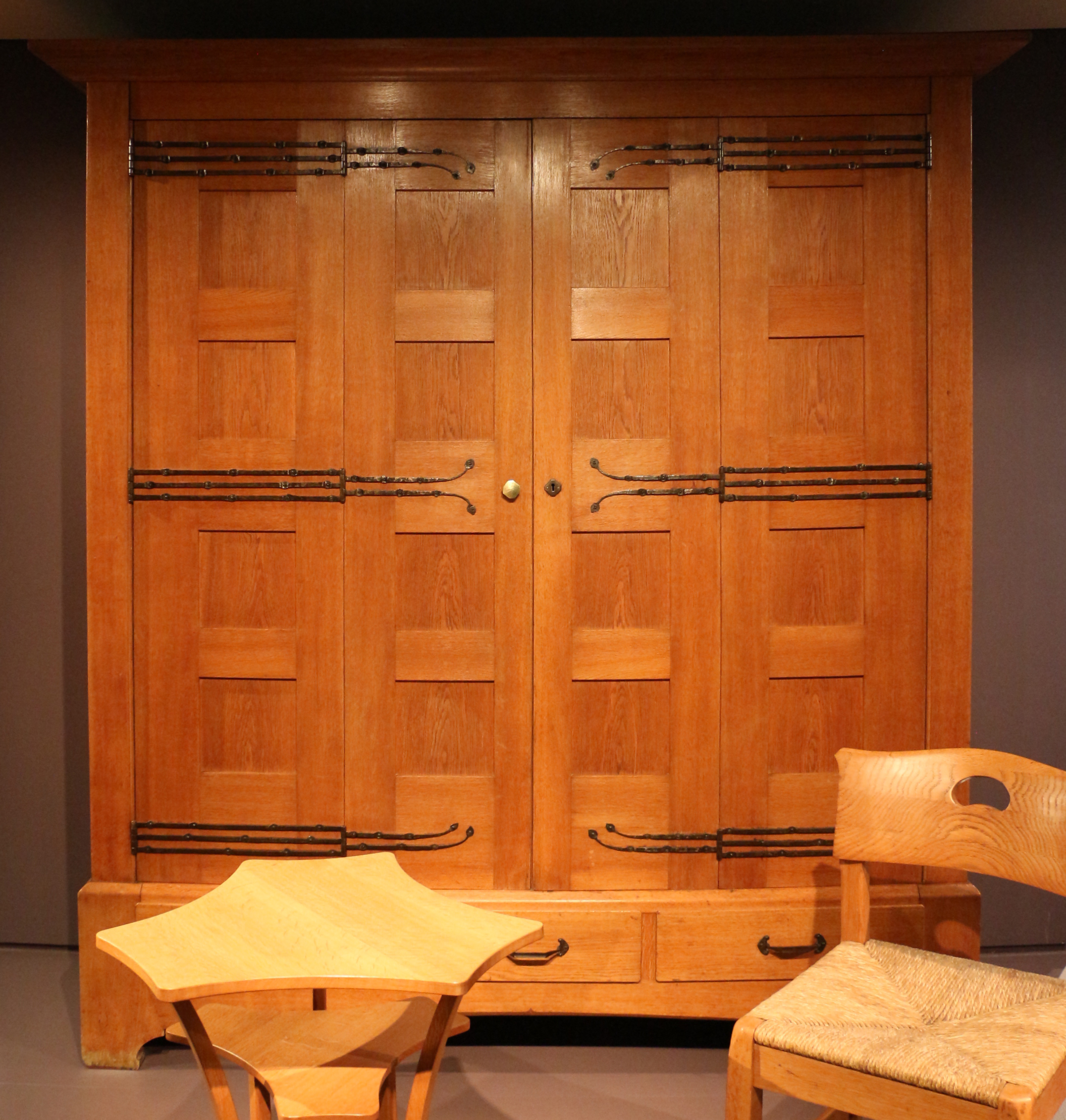
Wardrobe by Richard Riemerschmid (1902)

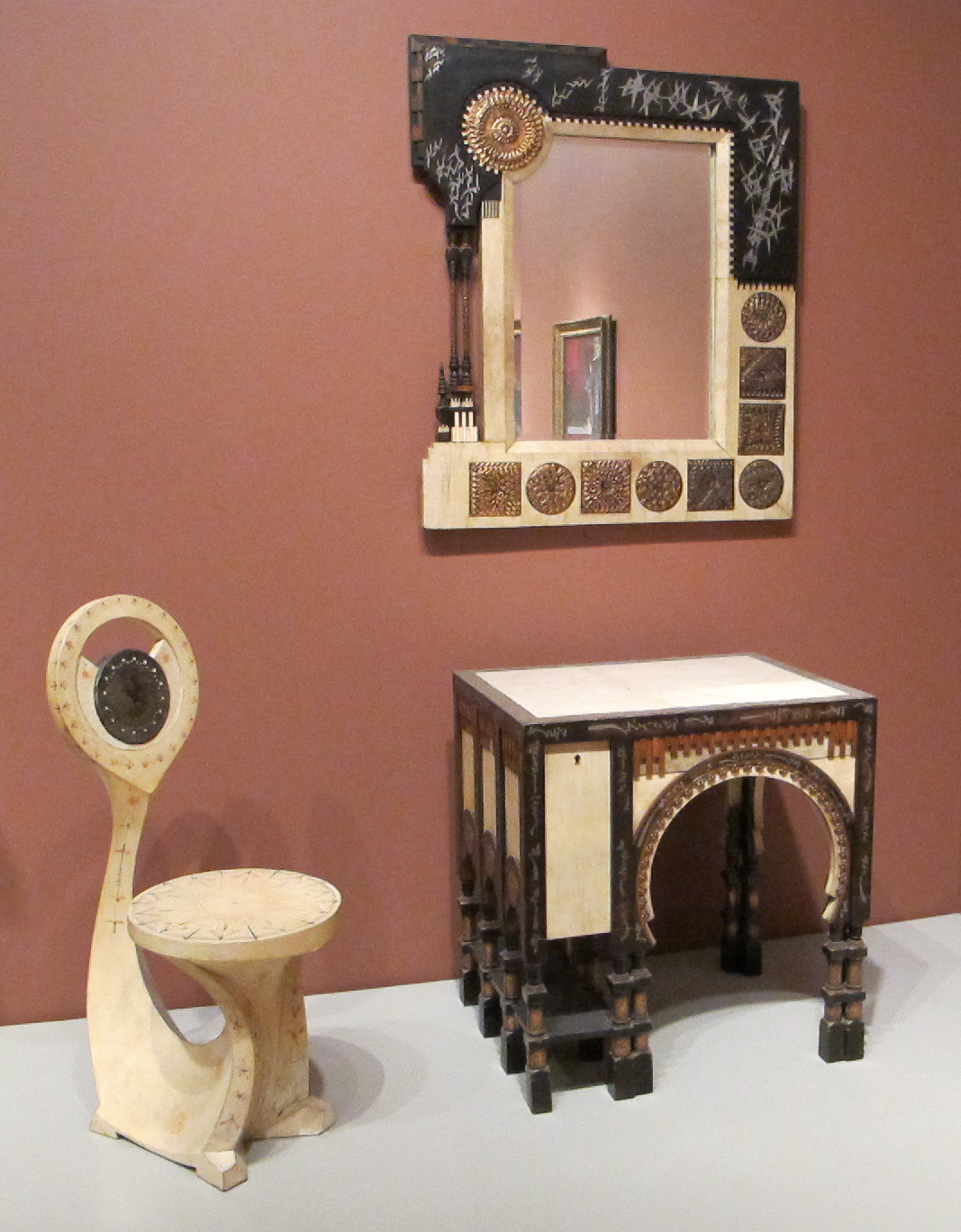
Snail chair and other furniture by Carlo Bugatti (1902)

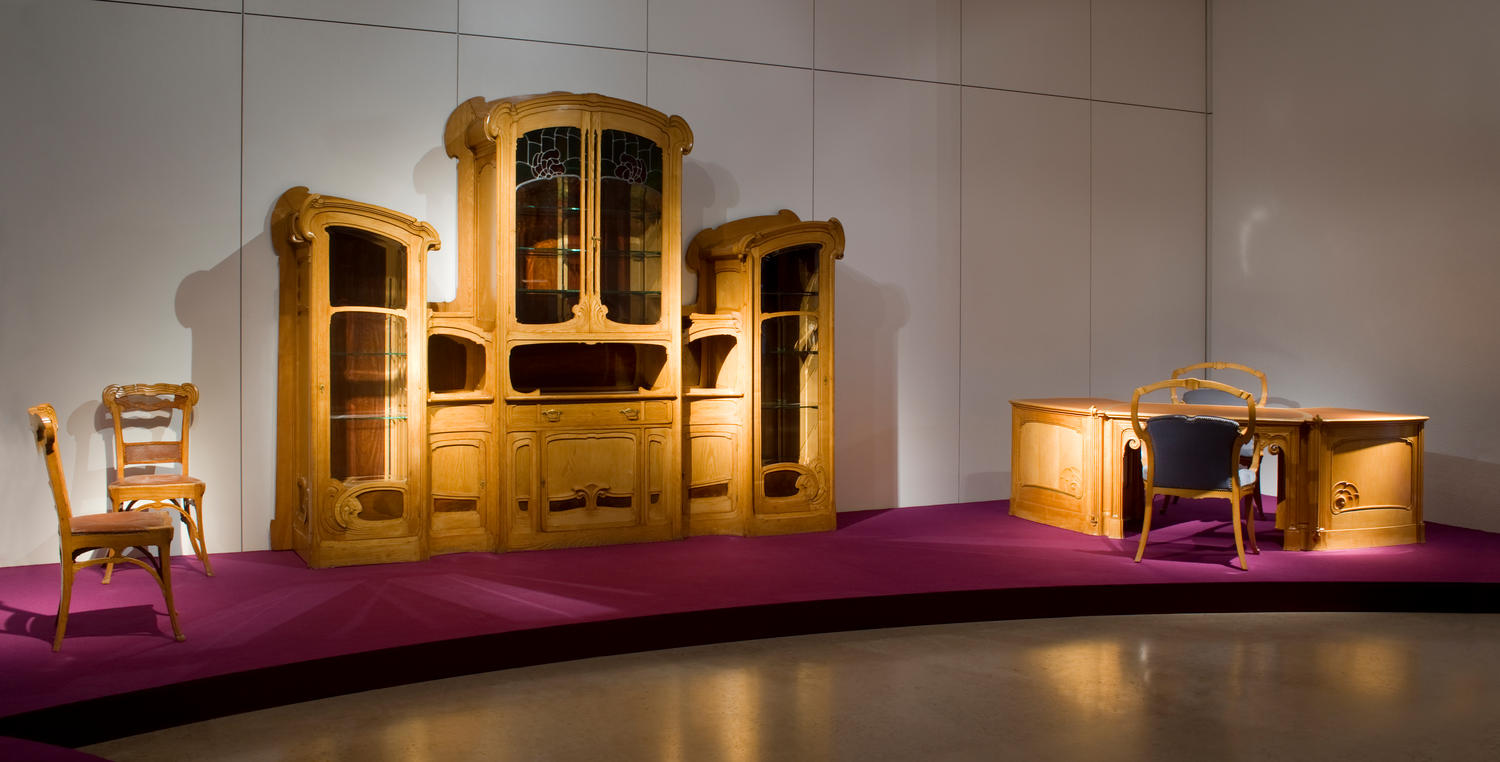
Furniture from Turin by Victor Horta (1902), in the collection of the King Baudouin Foundation

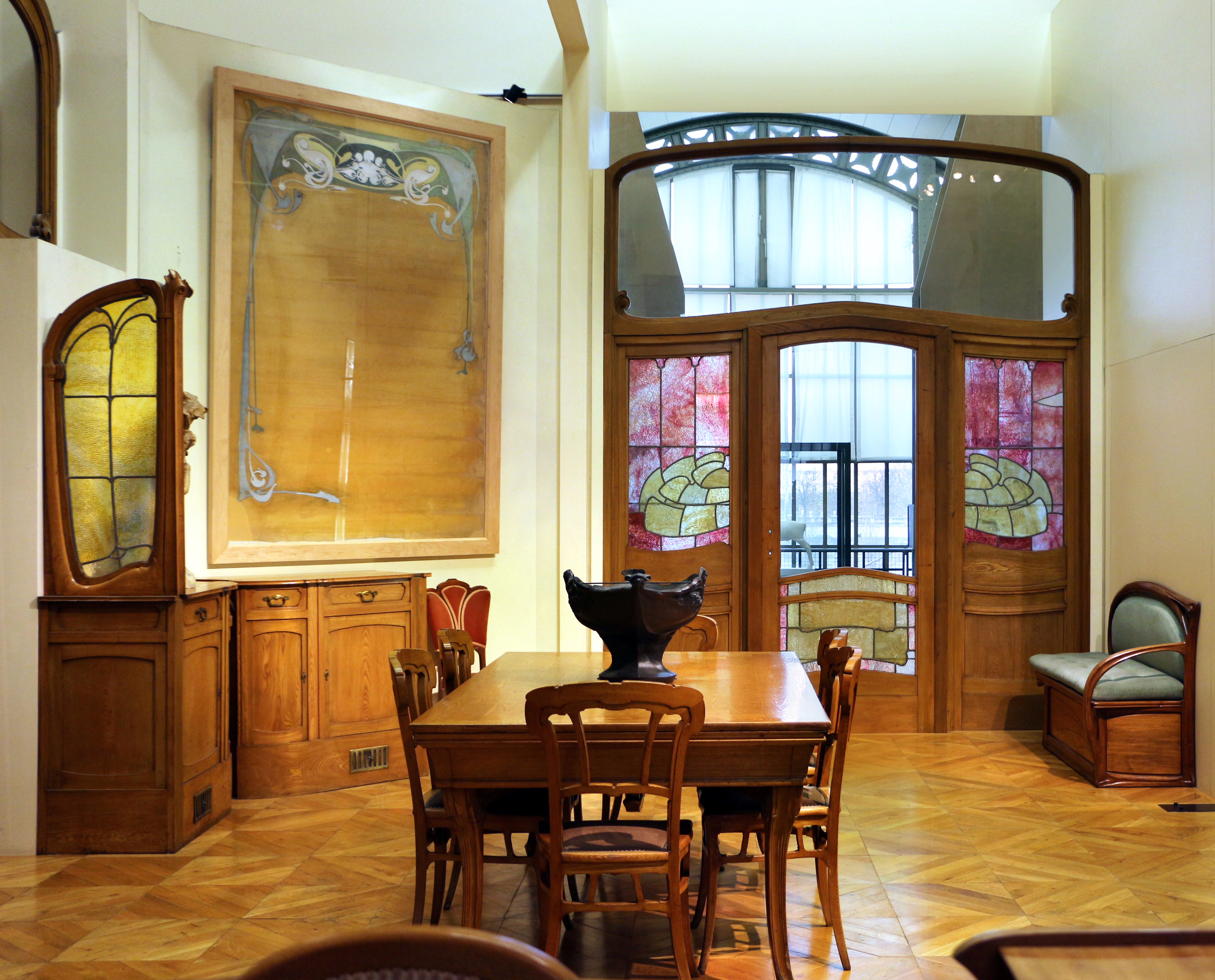
Furniture set by Horta from the Hôtel Aubecq in Brussels (1902–1904)

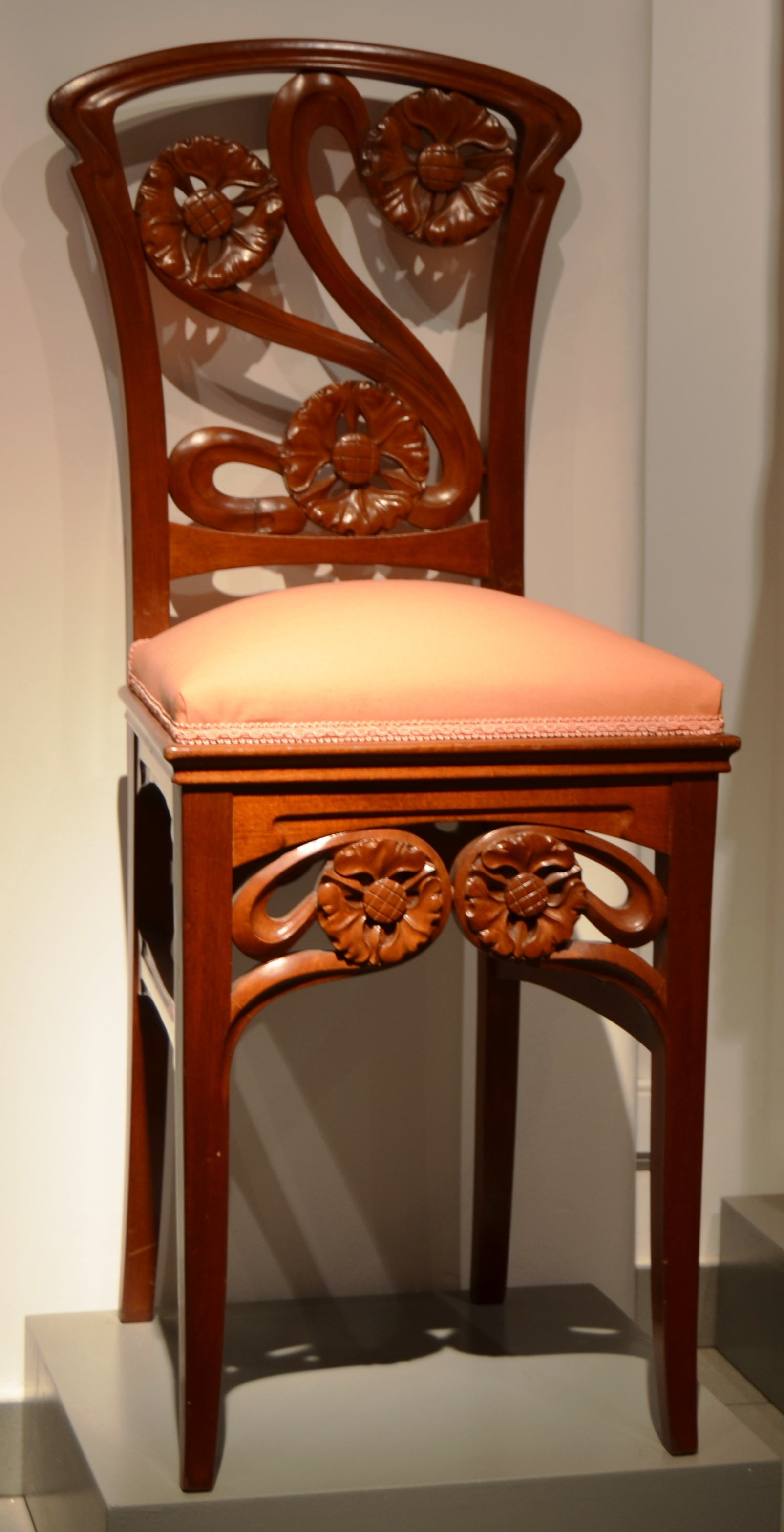
Chair by Gaspar Homar (1903)

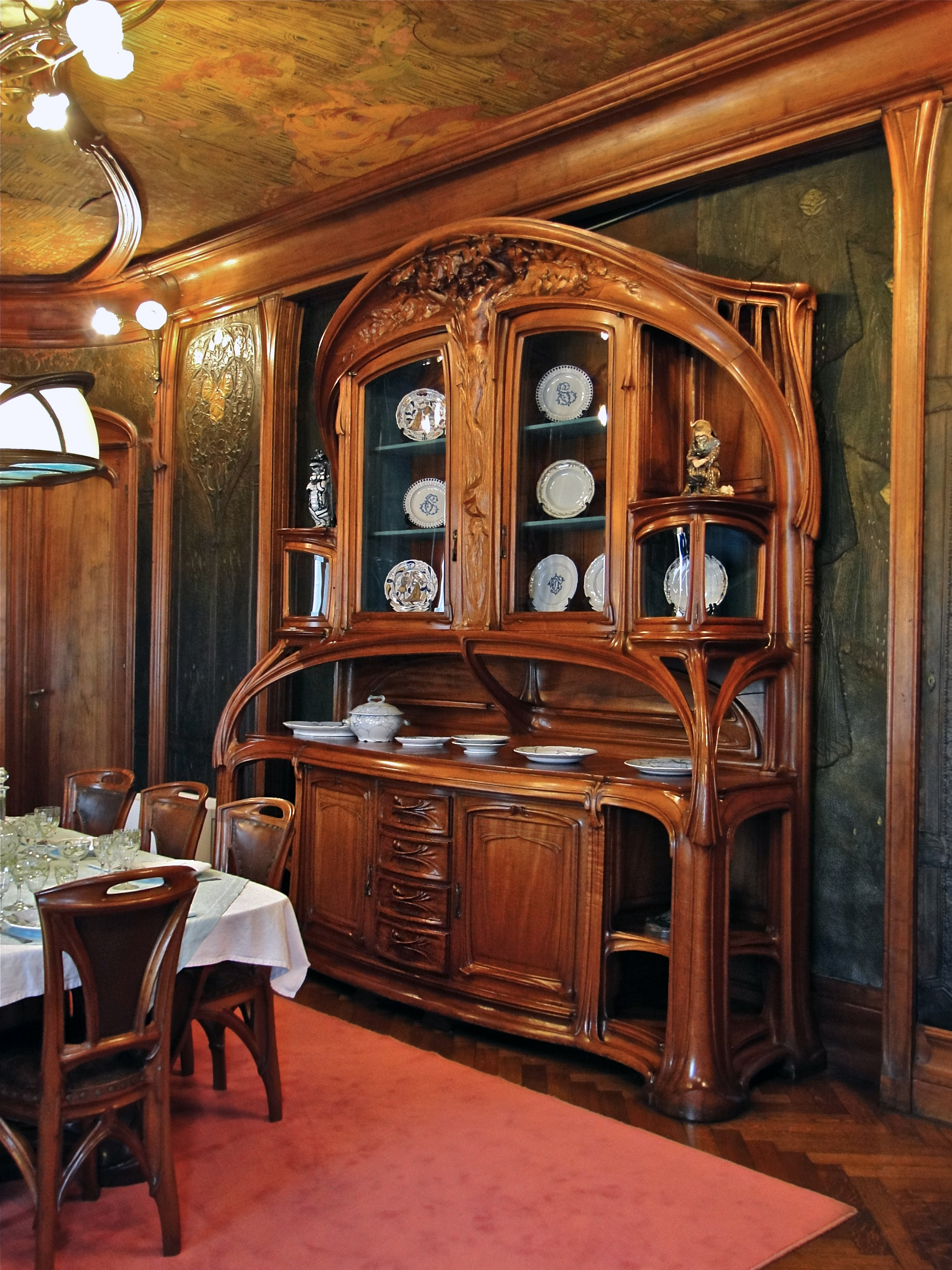
Dining room by Eugène Vallin (1903)

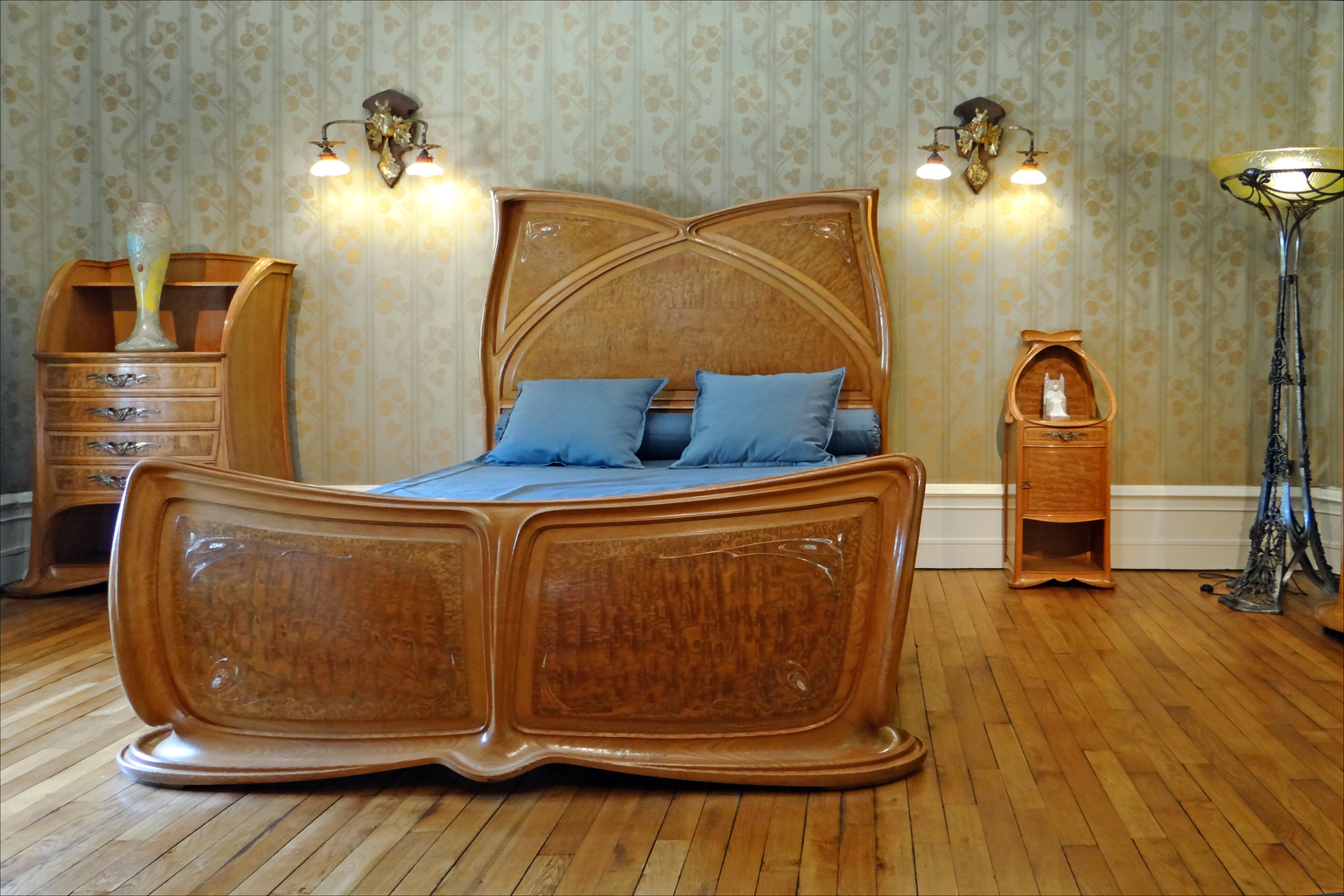
A bedroom by Louis Majorelle (1903–04)

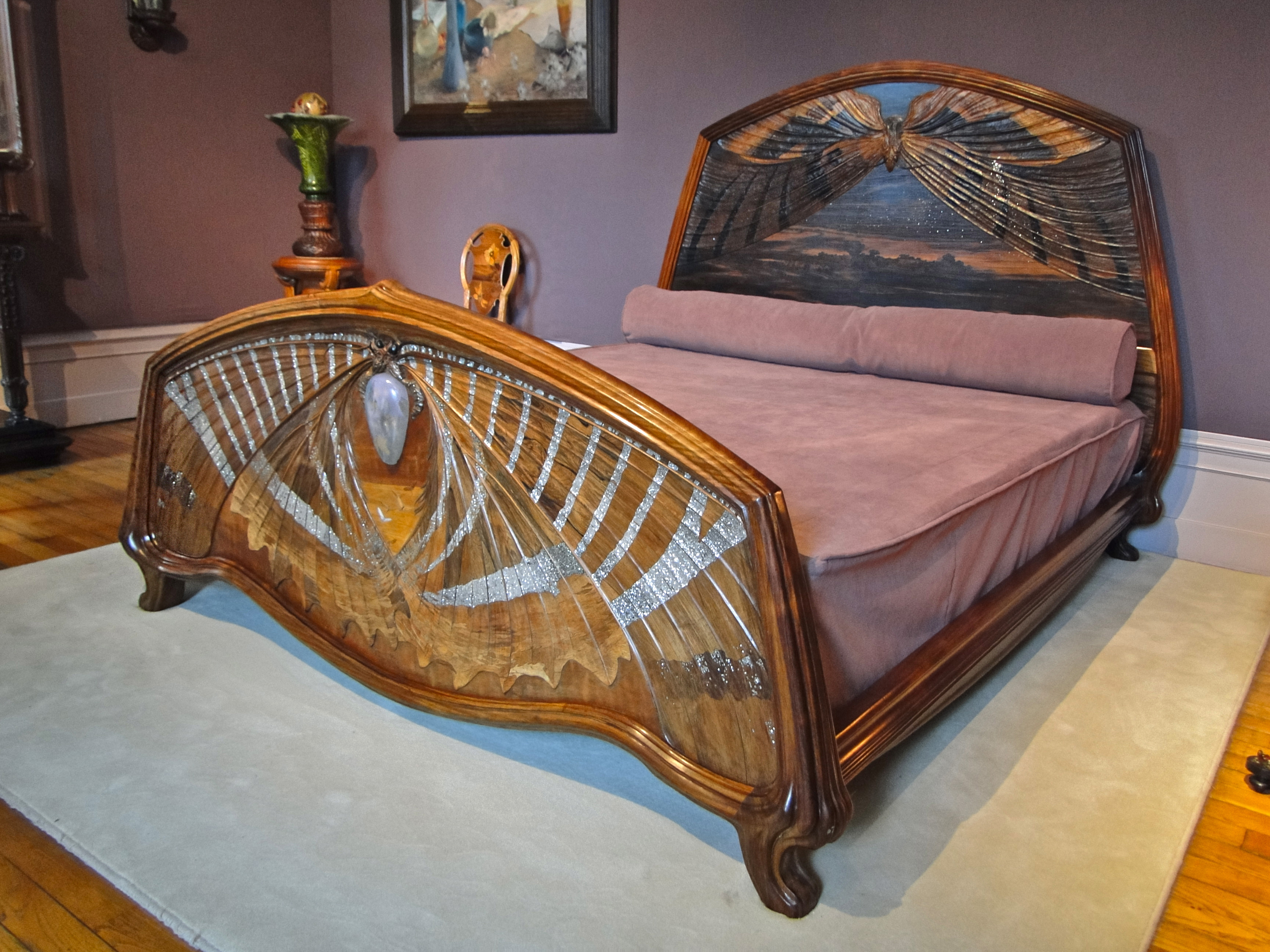
Dawn and Dusk bed by Émile Gallé (1904)

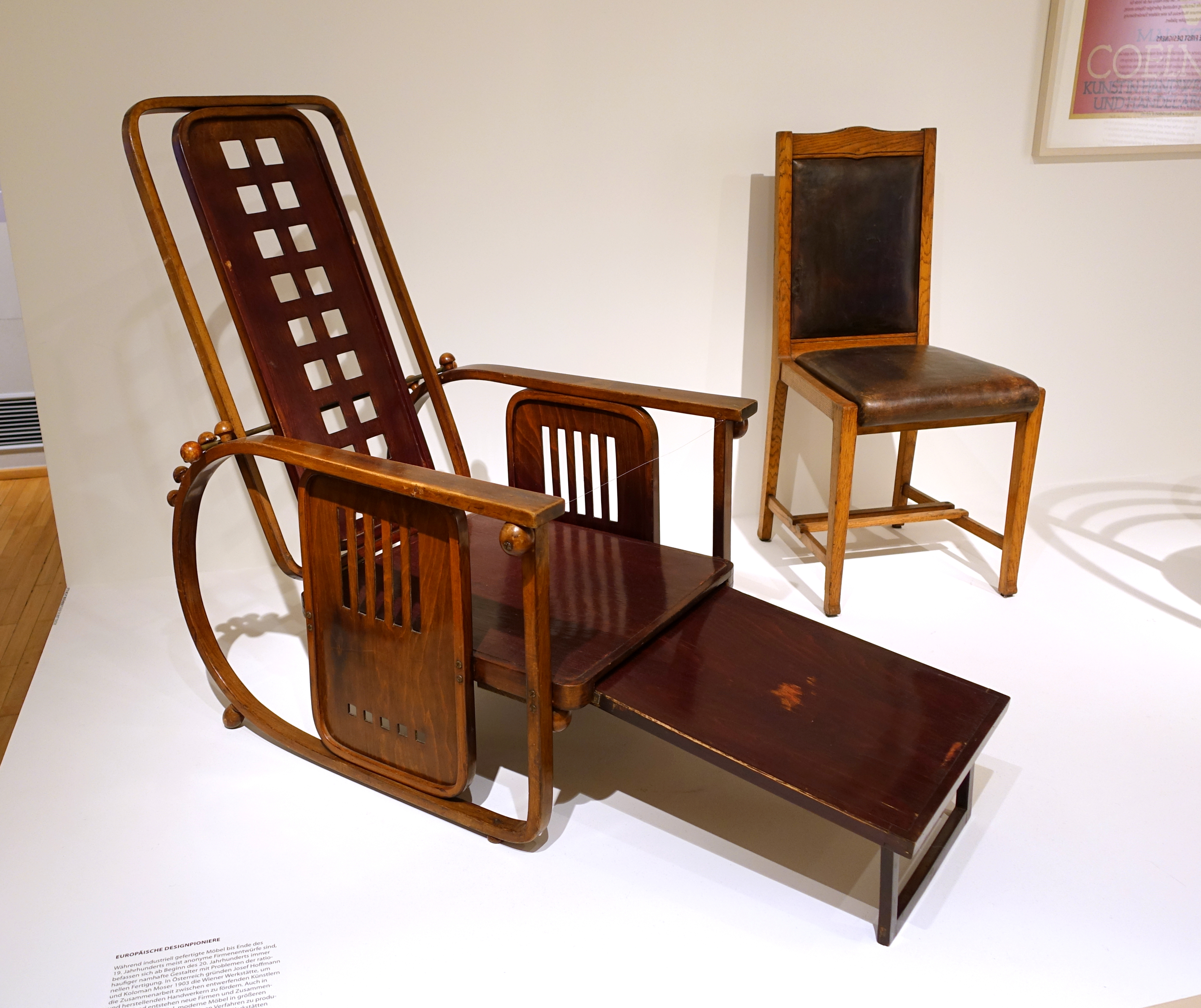
Adjustable armchair Model 670 Sitting Machine designed by Josef Hoffmann (1904–1906)

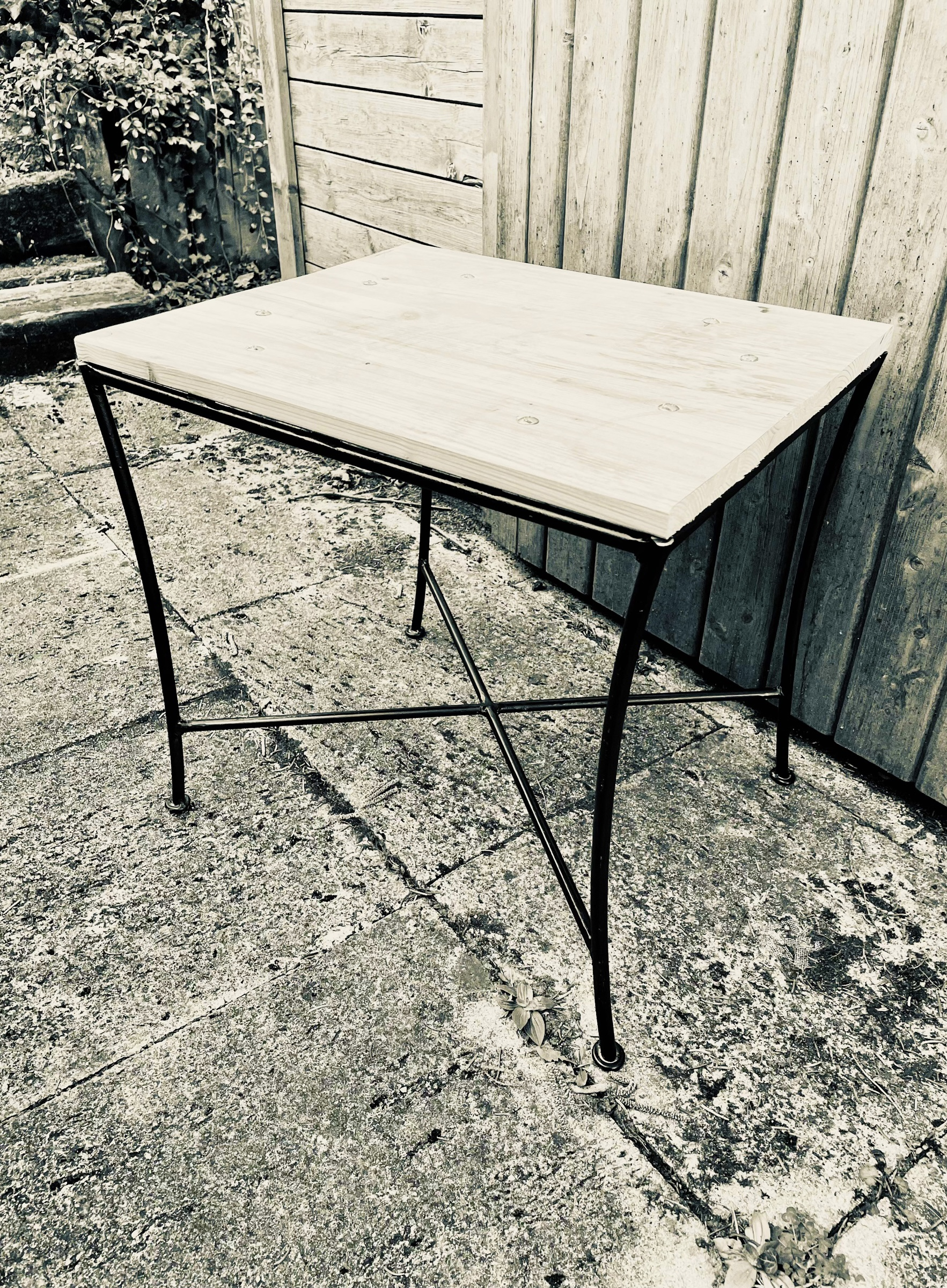
French Art Nouveau. Metal stool made in Lyon (1910)

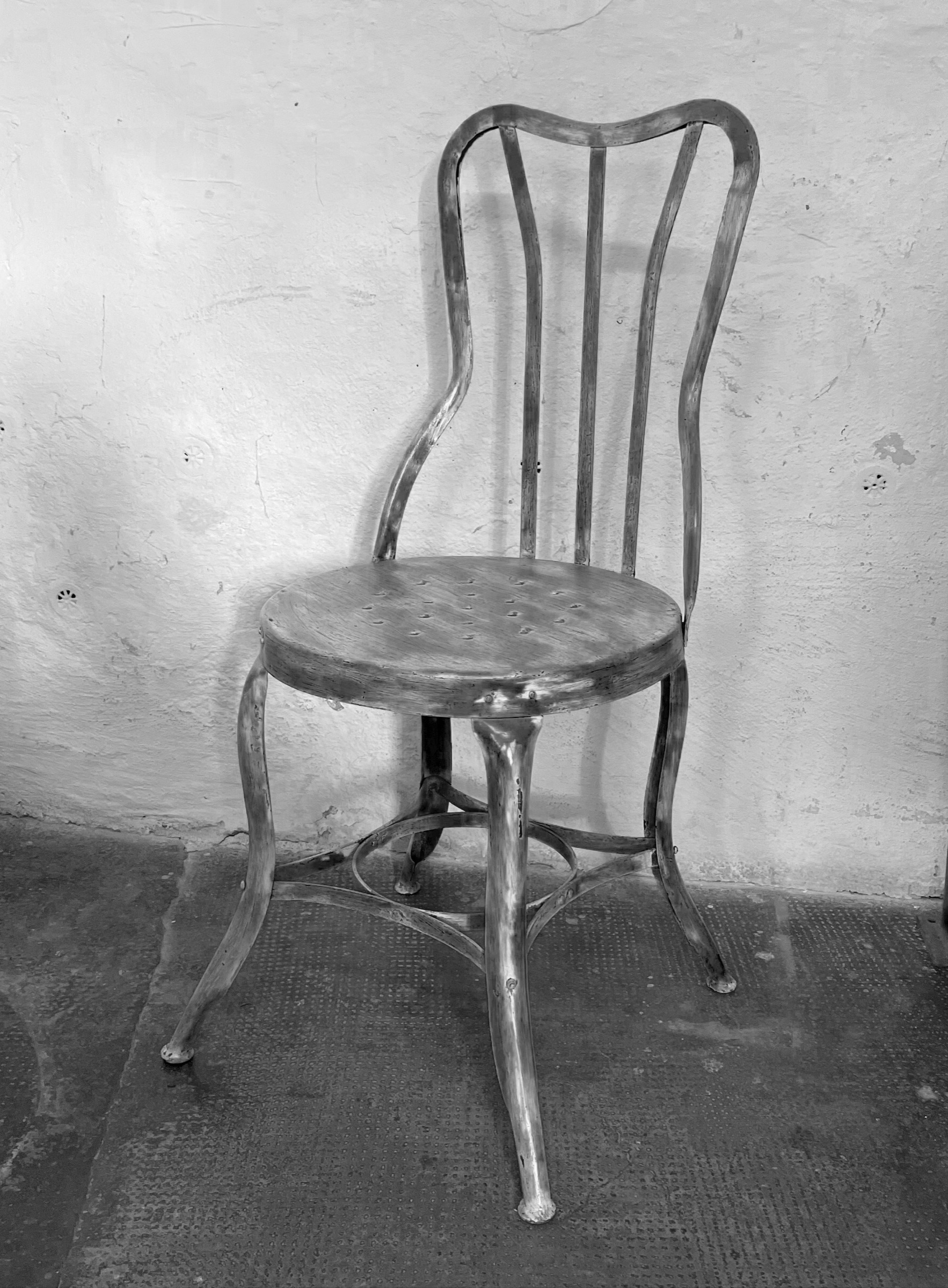
TOLEDO UHL steel chair "SODA FOUNTAIN" from 1910, Ohio

Furniture design in the Art Nouveau period was closely associated with the architecture of the buildings; the architects often designed the furniture, carpets, light fixtures, doorknobs, and other decorative details. The furniture was often complex and expensive; a fine finish, usually polished or varnished, was regarded as essential, and continental designs were usually very complex, with curving shapes that were expensive to make. It also had the drawback that the owner of the home could not change the furniture or add pieces in a different style without disrupting the entire effect of the room. For this reason, when Art Nouveau architecture went out of style, the style of furniture also largely disappeared.

In France, the centre for furniture design and manufacture was in Nancy, where two major designers, Émile Gallé and Louis Majorelle had their studios and workshops, and where the Alliance des industries d'art (later called the School of Nancy) had been founded in 1901. Both designers based on their structure and ornamentation on forms taken from nature, including flowers and insects, such as the dragonfly, a popular motif in Art Nouveau design. Gallé was particularly known for his use of marquetry in relief, in the form of landscapes or poetic themes. Majorelle was known for his use of exotic and expensive woods, and for attaching bronze sculpted in vegetal themes to his pieces of furniture. Both designers used machines for the first phases of manufacture, but all the pieces were finished by hand. Other notable furniture designers of the Nancy School included Eugène Vallin and Émile André; both were architects by training, and both designed furniture that resembled the furniture from Belgian designers such as Horta and Van de Velde, which had less decoration and followed more closely the curving plants and flowers.

Other notable French designers included Henri Bellery-Desfontaines, who took his inspiration from the neo-Gothic styles of Viollet-le-Duc; and Georges de Feure, Eugène Gaillard, and Édouard Colonna, who worked together with art dealer Siegfried Bing to revitalize the French furniture industry with new themes. Their work was known for "abstract naturalism", its unity of straight and curved lines, and its rococo influence. The furniture of de Feure at the Bing pavilion won a gold medal at the 1900 Paris Exposition. The most unusual and picturesque French designer was François-Rupert Carabin, a sculptor by training, whose furniture featured sculpted nude female forms and symbolic animals, particularly cats, who combined Art Nouveau elements with Symbolism. Other influential Paris furniture designers were Charles Plumet, and Alexandre Charpentier. In many ways the old vocabulary and techniques of classic French 18th-century Rococo furniture were re-interpreted in a new style.

In Belgium, the pioneer architects of the Art Nouveau movement, Victor Horta and Henry van de Velde, designed furniture for their houses, using vigorous curving lines and a minimum of decoration. The Belgian designer Gustave Serrurier-Bovy added more decoration, applying brass strips in curving forms. In the Netherlands, where the style was called Nieuwe Kunst or New Art, H. P. Berlage, Carel Adolph Lion Cachet and Theodor Nieuwenhuis followed a different course, that of the English Arts and Crafts movement, with more geometric rational forms.

In Britain, the furniture of Charles Rennie Mackintosh was purely Arts and Crafts, austere and geometrical, with long straight lines and right angles and a minimum of decoration. Continental designs were much more elaborate, often using curved shapes both in the basic shapes of the piece, and in applied decorative motifs. In Germany, the furniture of Peter Behrens and the Jugendstil was largely rationalist, with geometric straight lines and some decoration attached to the surface. Their goal was exactly the opposite of French Art Nouveau; simplicity of structure and simplicity of materials, for furniture that could be inexpensive and easily mass-manufactured. The same was true for the furniture of designers of the Wiener Werkstätte in Vienna, led by Otto Wagner, Josef Hoffmann, Josef Maria Olbrich and Koloman Moser. The furniture was geometric and had a minimum of decoration, though in style it often followed national historic precedent, particularly the Biedemeier style.

Italian and Spanish furniture design went off in their own direction. Carlo Bugatti in Italy designed the extraordinary Snail Chair, wood covered with painted parchment and copper, for the Turin International Exposition of 1902. In Spain, following the lead of Antoni Gaudí and the Modernismo movement, the furniture designer Gaspar Homar designed works that were inspired by natural forms with touches of Catalan historic styles.

In the United States, furniture design was more often inspired by the Arts and Crafts movement, or by historic American models, than by the Art Nouveau. One designer who did introduce Art Nouveau themes was Charles Rohlfs in Buffalo, N.Y., whose designs for American white oak furniture were influenced by motifs of Celtic art and Gothic art, with touches of Art Nouveau in the metal trim applied to the pieces.

=== Ceramics ===
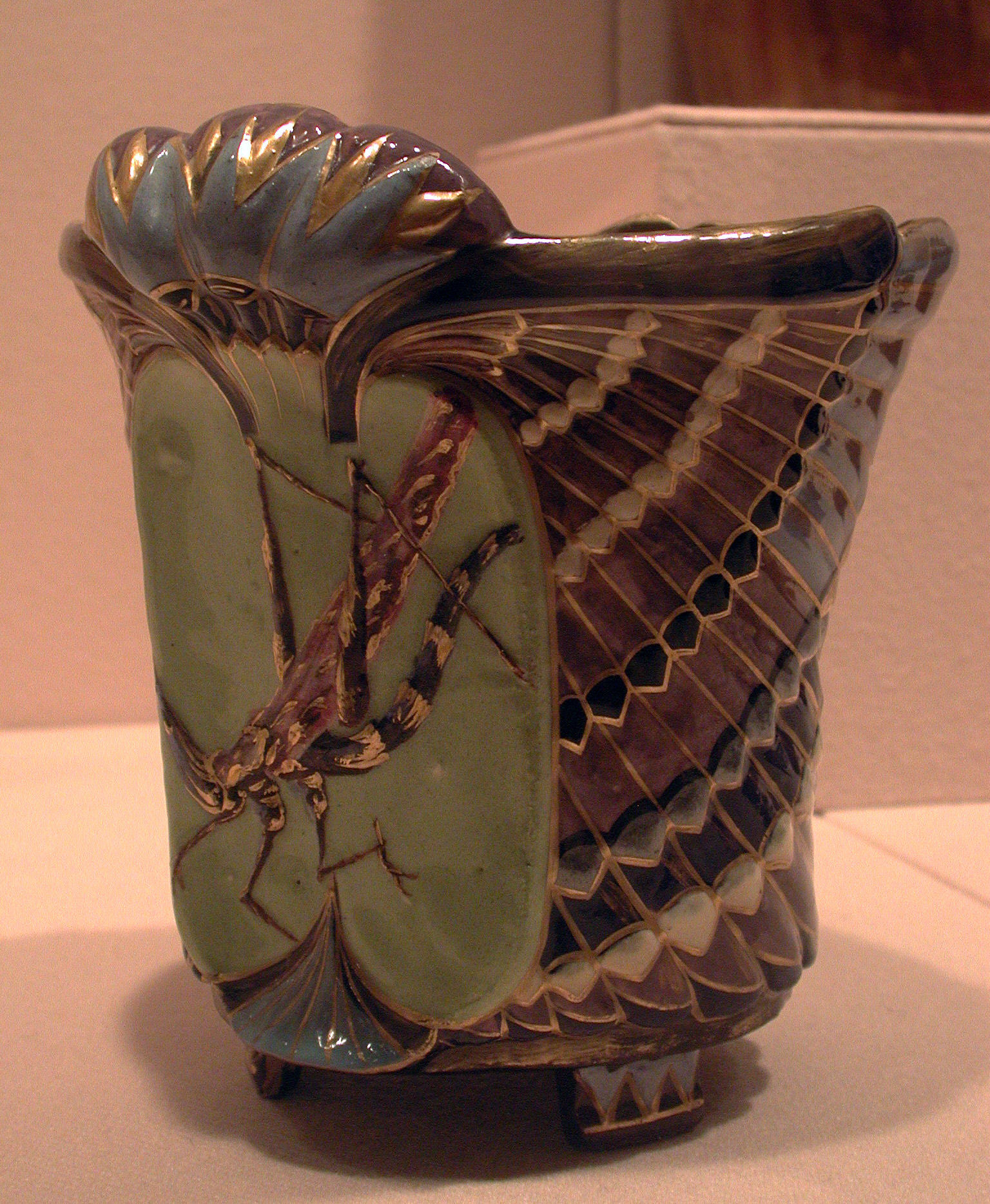
Glazed earthenware vase, by Émile Gallé (1880–1885), Metropolitan Museum of Art, New York City

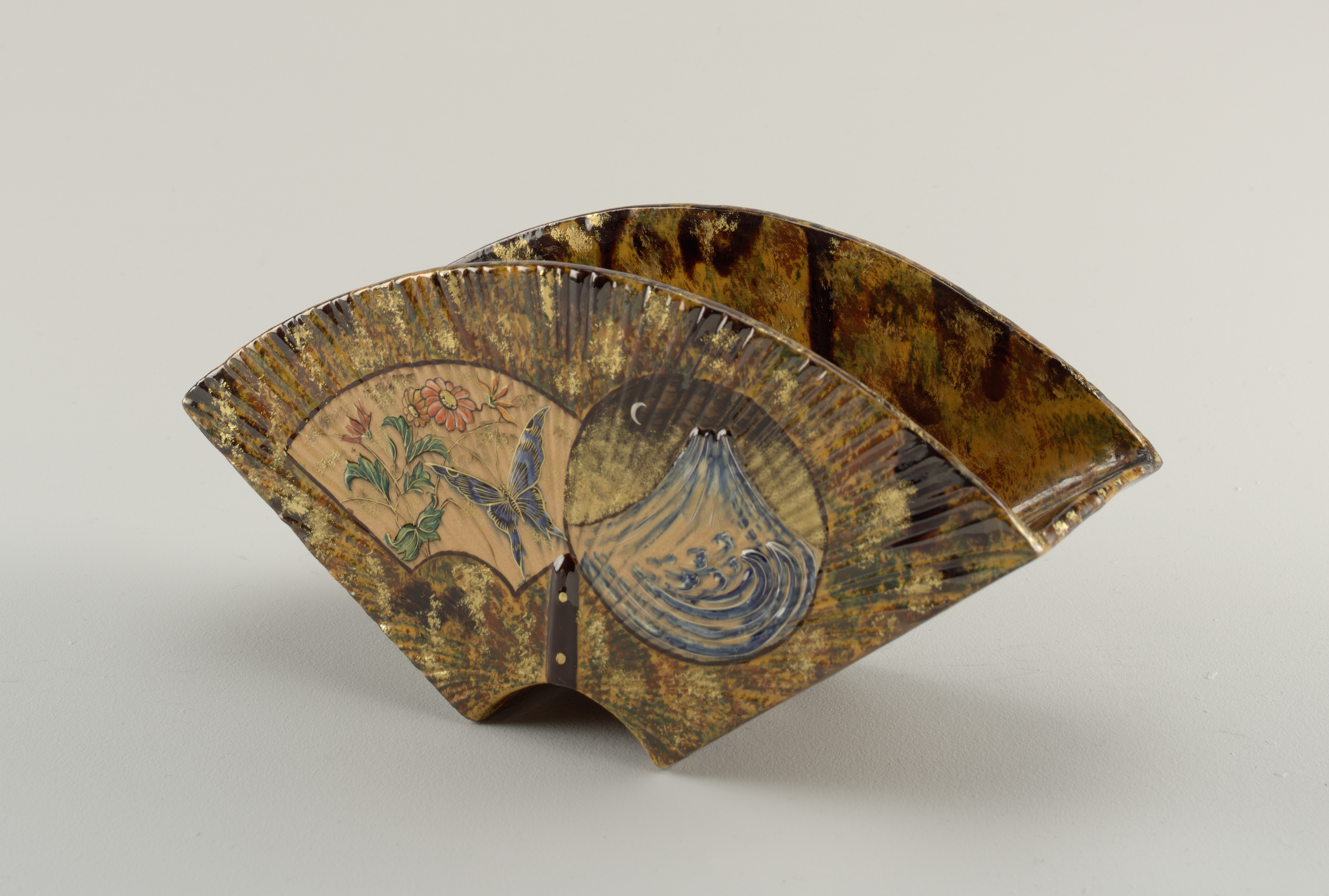
Faience or earthenware vase with two feet, with mountain night scene on the back and a floral daylight scene with butterfly on the front, by Gallé (1884–85), Cooper Hewitt, Smithsonian Design Museum, New York City

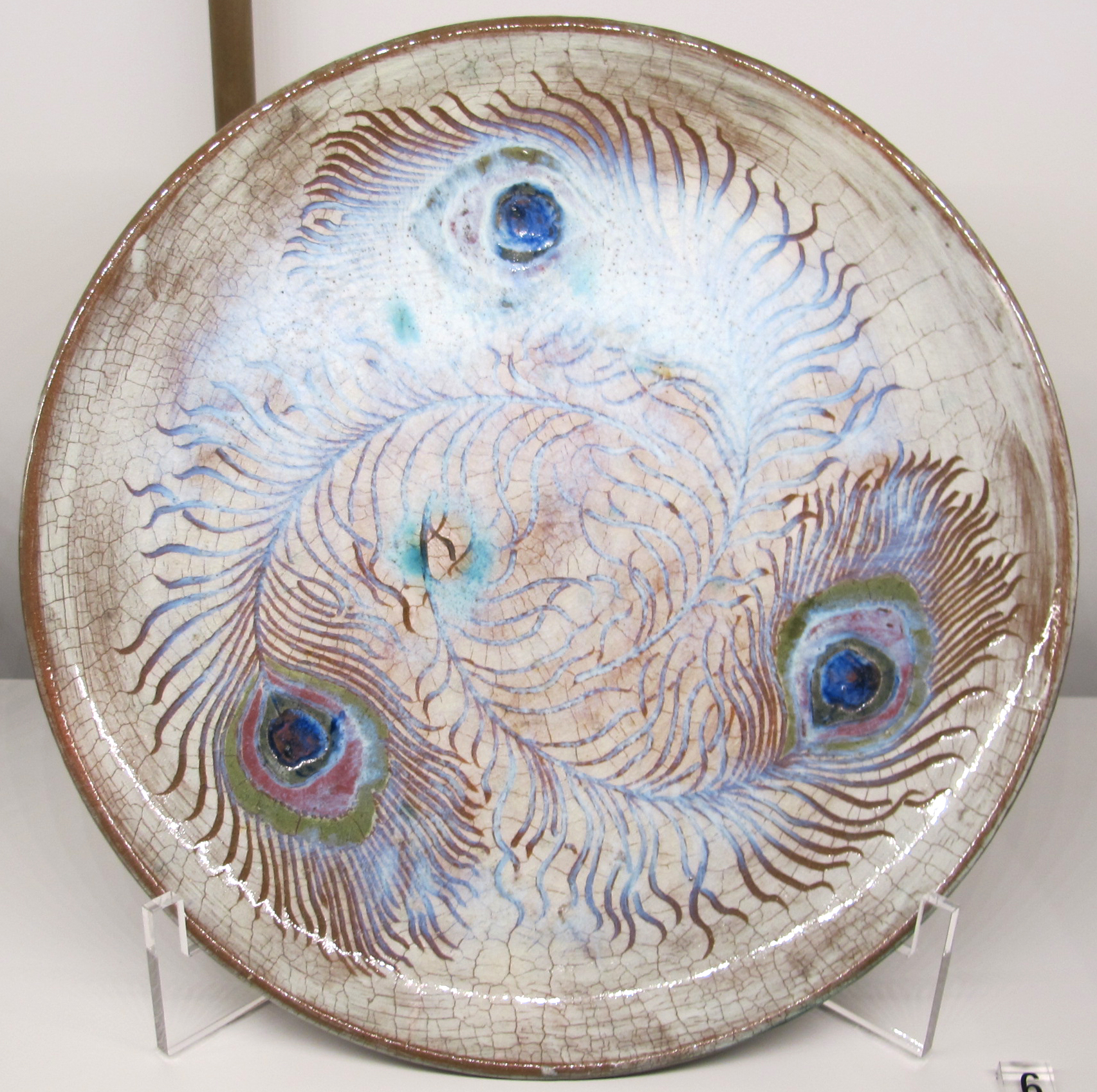
Plate with peacock feathers, by Auguste Delaherche (1887–1894), Museum of Decorative Arts, Paris

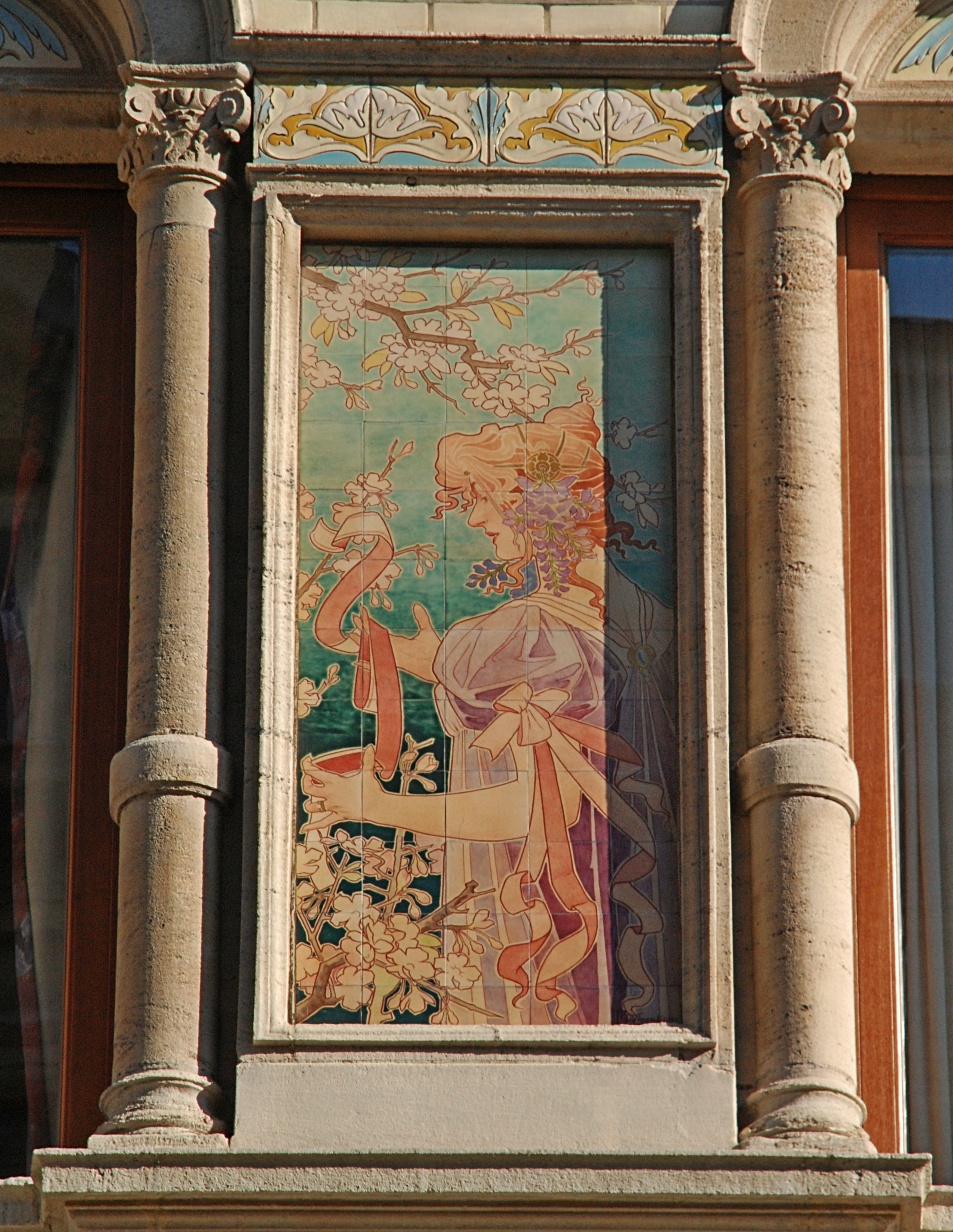
Hand-painted tile panel on the façade of the Grande Maison de Blanc in Brussels, designed by Privat Livemont and made by the Boch Frères Kéramis (1897–98)

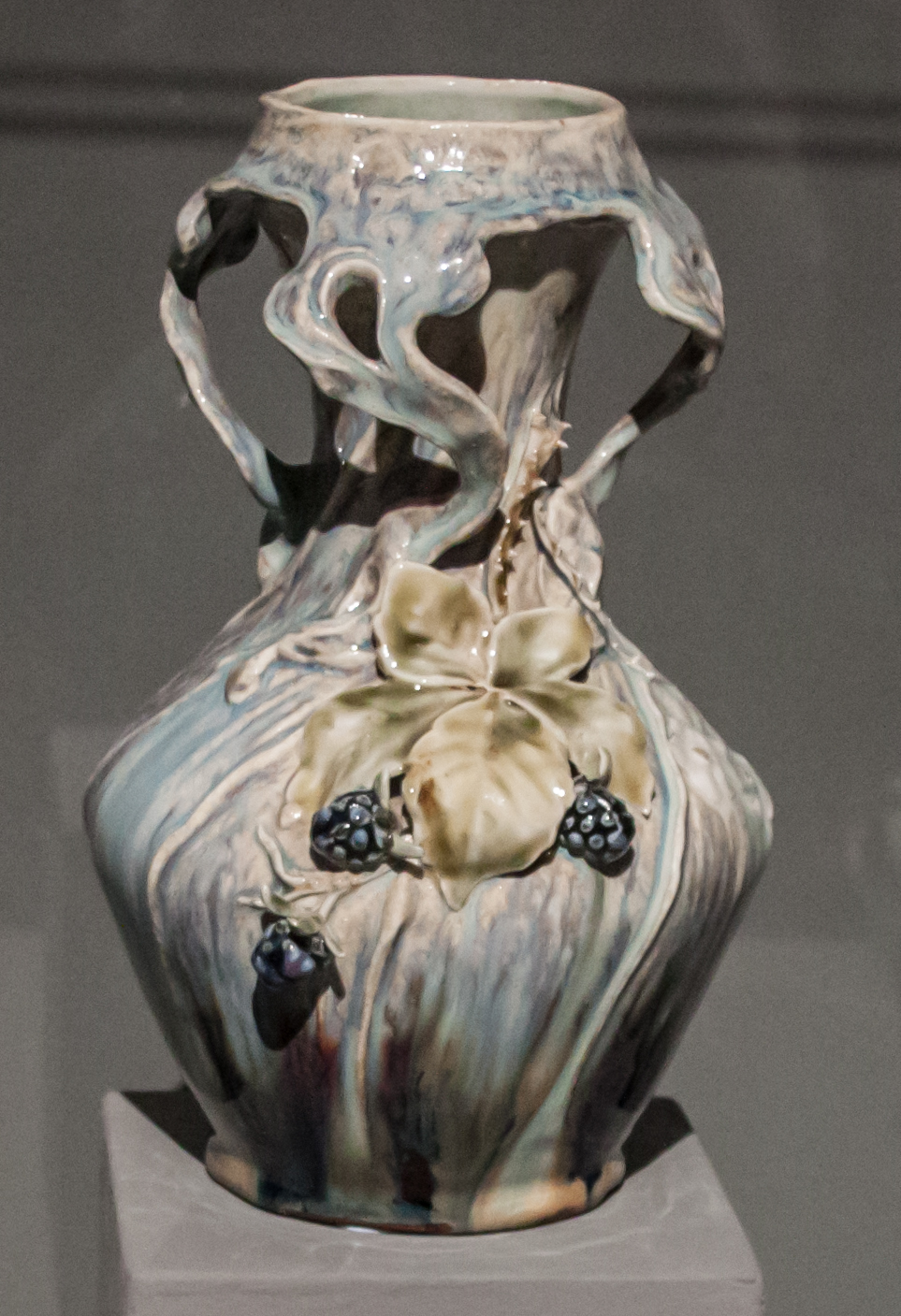
Amphora with elm-leaf and blackberry, manufactured by Stellmacher & Kessner (c. 1900), Museum of Applied Arts, Budapest

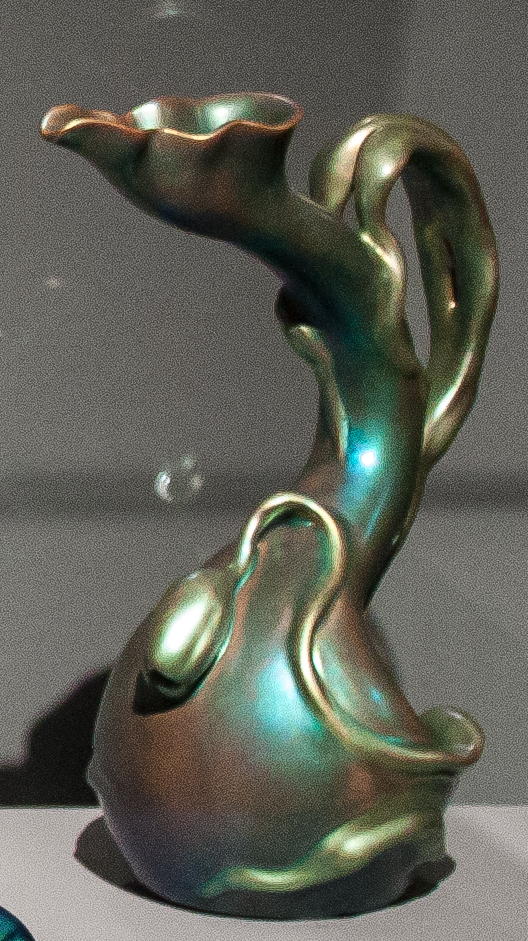
Vase, by József Rippl-Rónai (1900), in the Museum of Applied Arts, Budapest

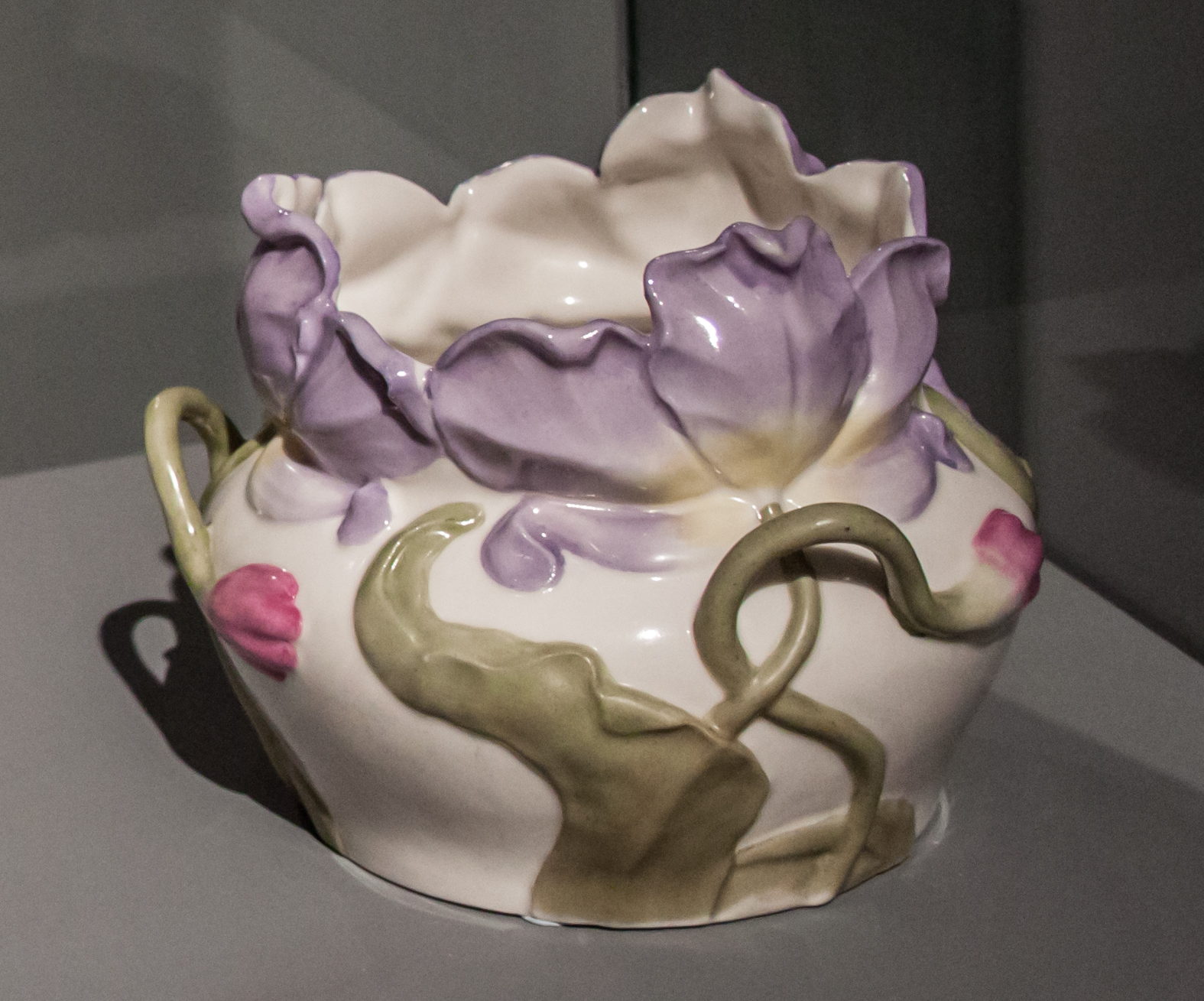
Vase with vines and snails, by Pál Horti (1900), Museum of Applied Arts, Budapest

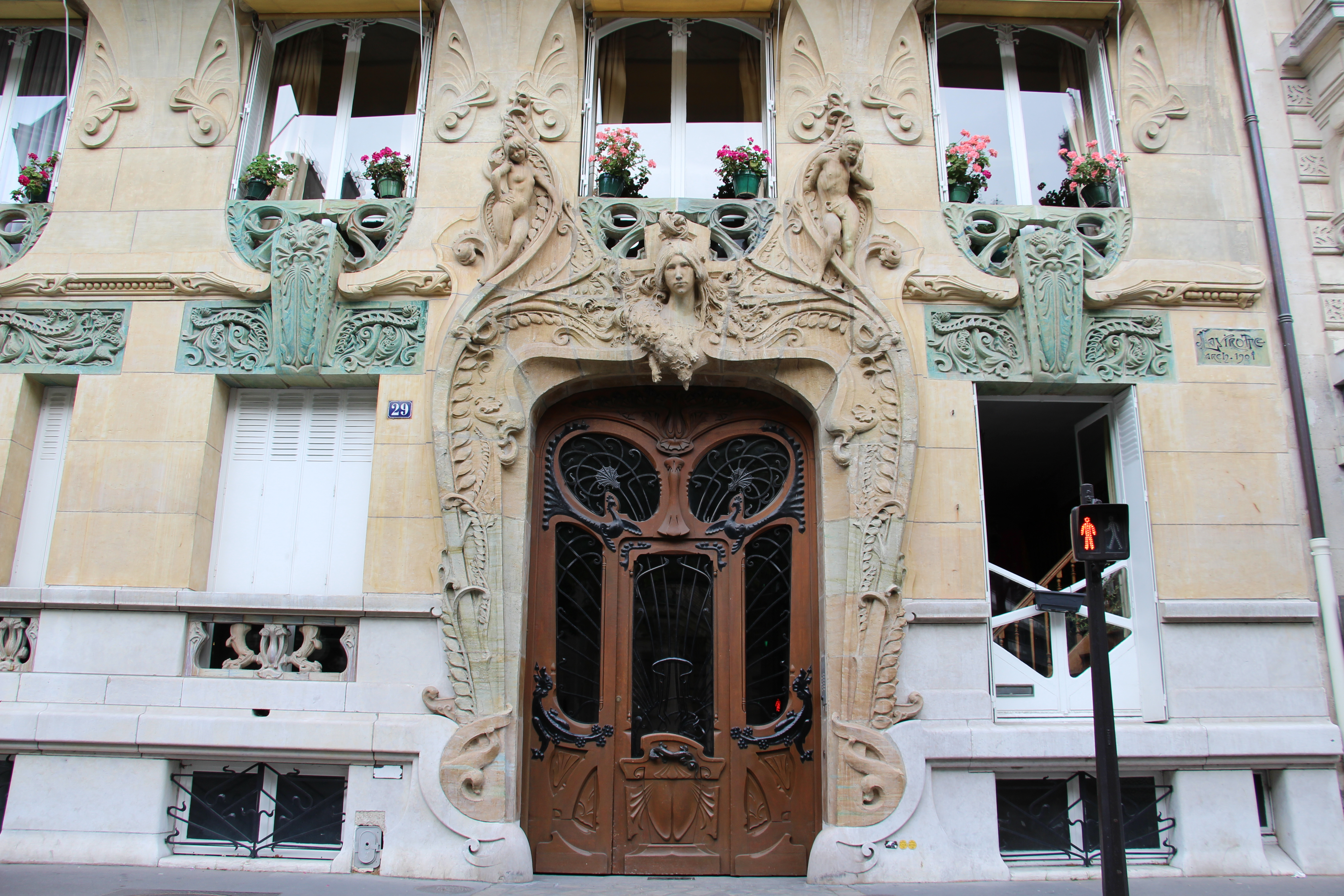
Ceramic façade decoration of Lavirotte Building (Avenue Rapp no. 29) in Paris, designed by Jules Lavirotte and decorated with sculpture and ceramic tiles made by the ceramics manufacturer Alexandre Bigot (1901)

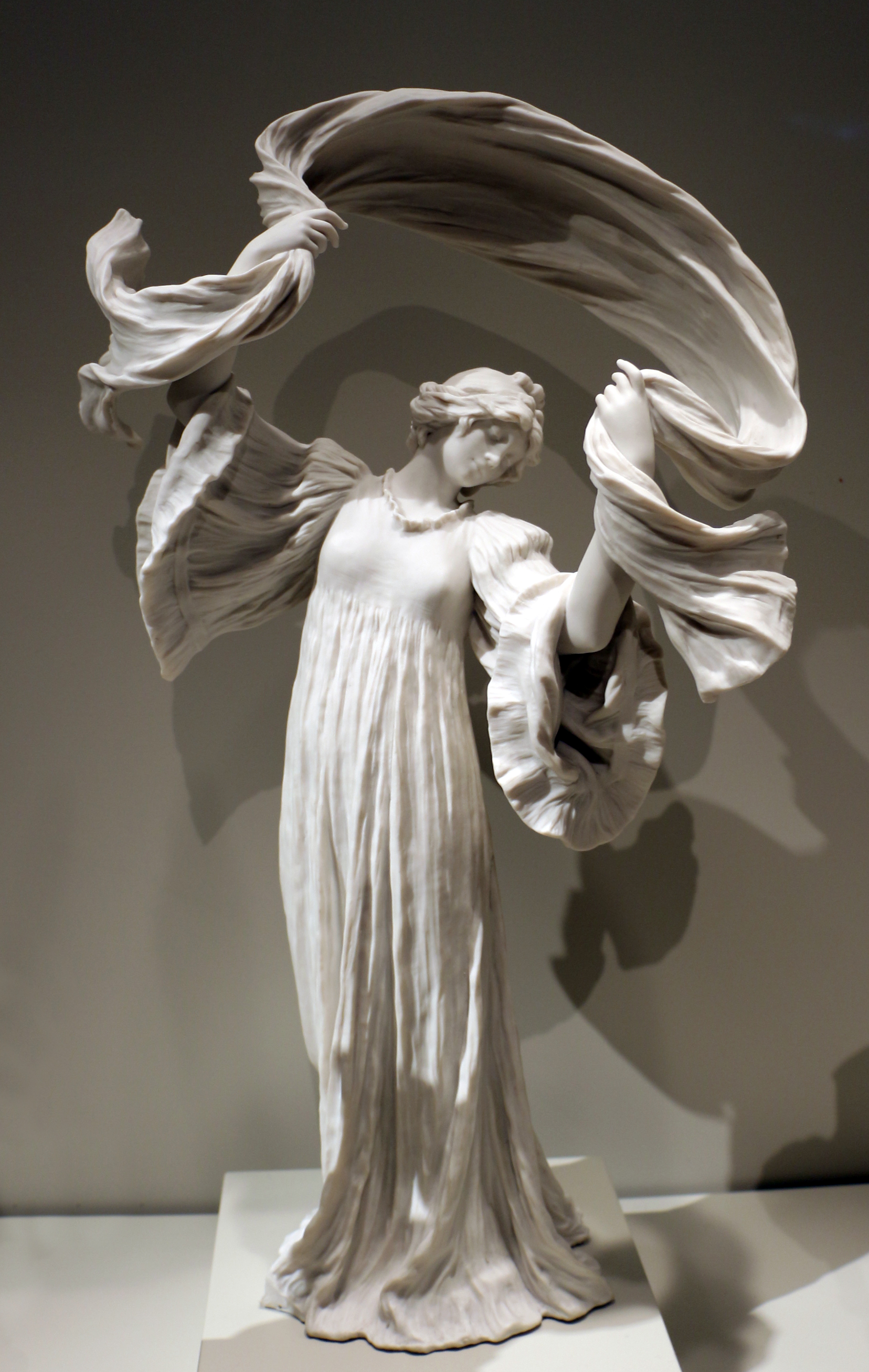
The Scarf Dance, by Agathon Léonard (1901–02), Art Institute of Chicago, US

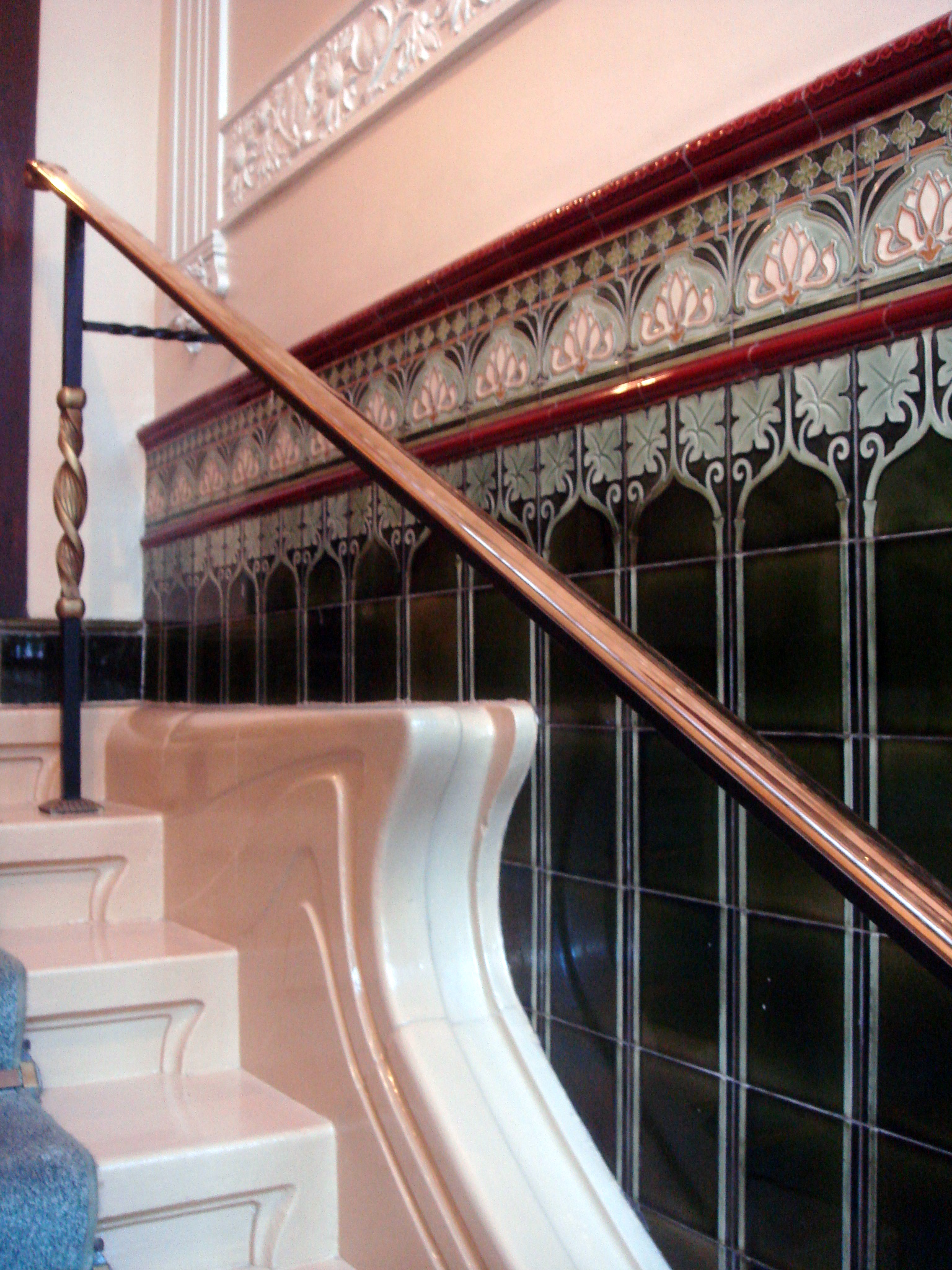
Tiles in the hallway of Allée de la Robertsau no. 56 in Strasbourg, France, designed by Frantz Lütke and Heinrich Backes (1902)

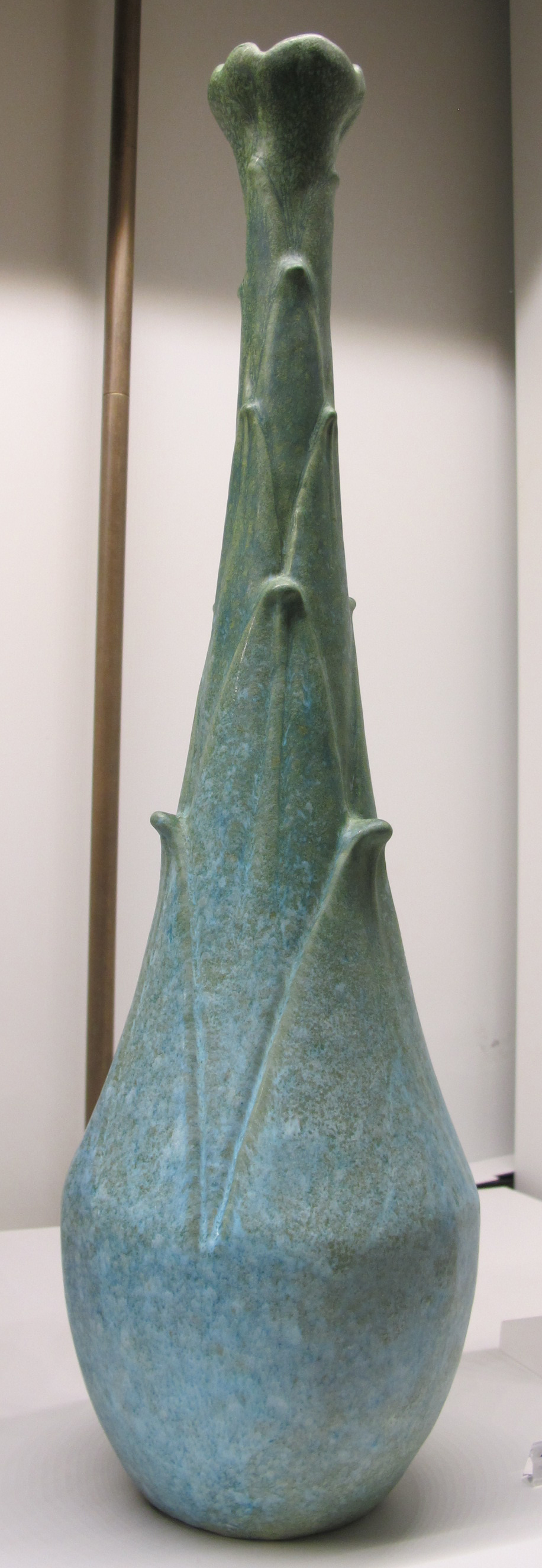
Vase, by Edmond Lachenal (1902), Museum of Decorative Arts, Paris

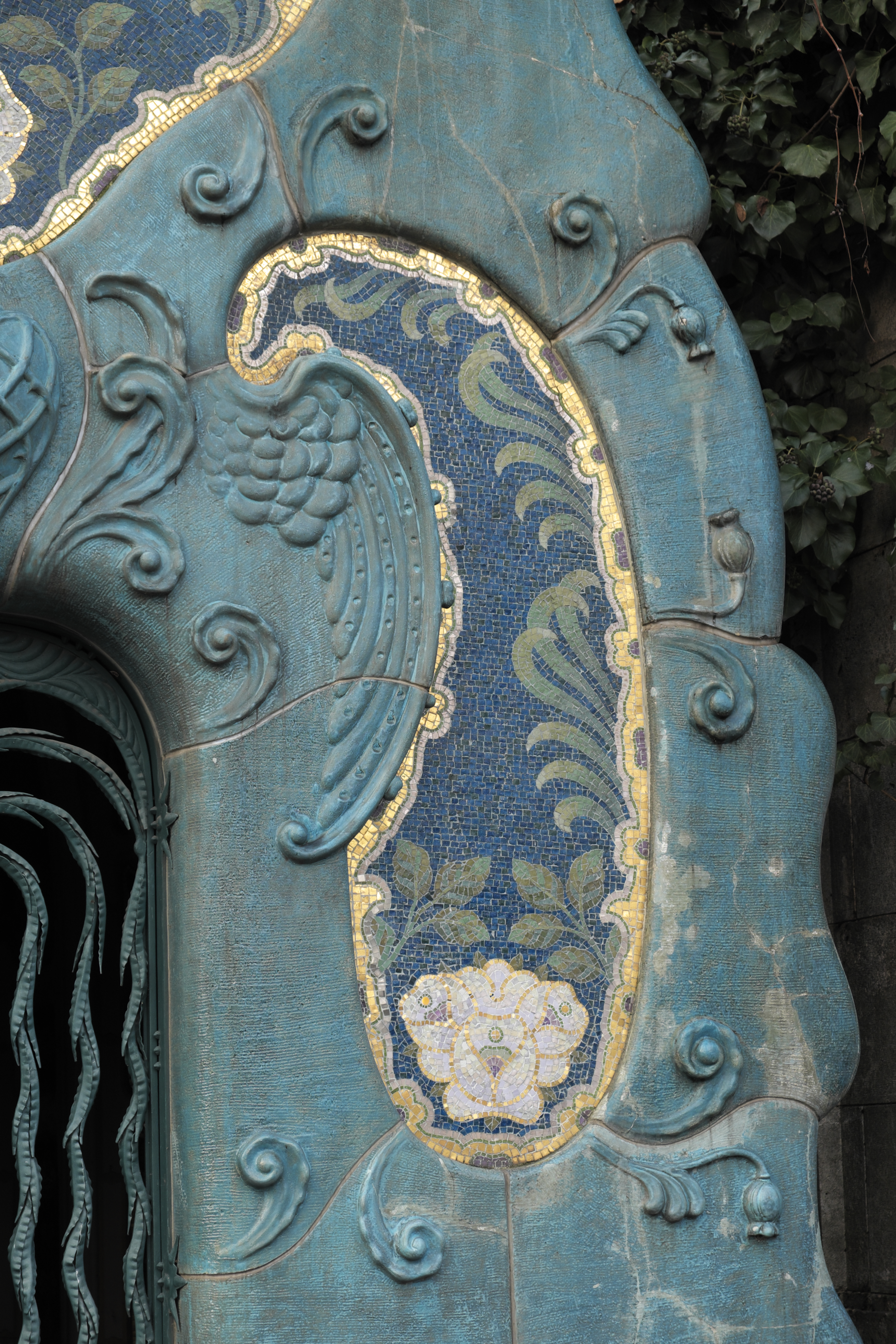
Mosaics of the Schmidl Mausoleum in Budapest by the Zsolnay factory and Miksa Róth (1902–03)

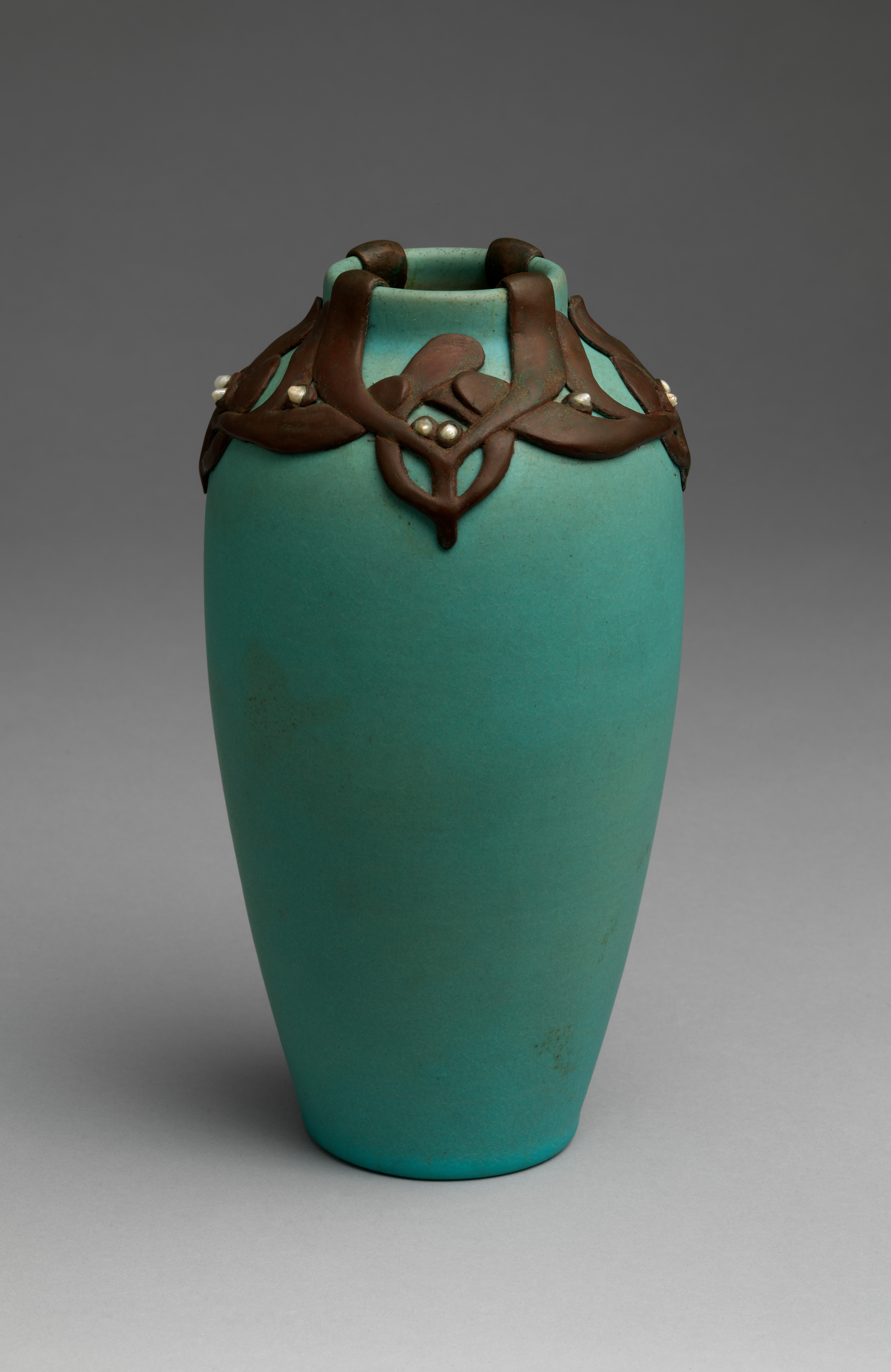
Mistletoe vase, by Artus Van Briggle for Van Briggle Pottery (1904), Metropolitan Museum of Art

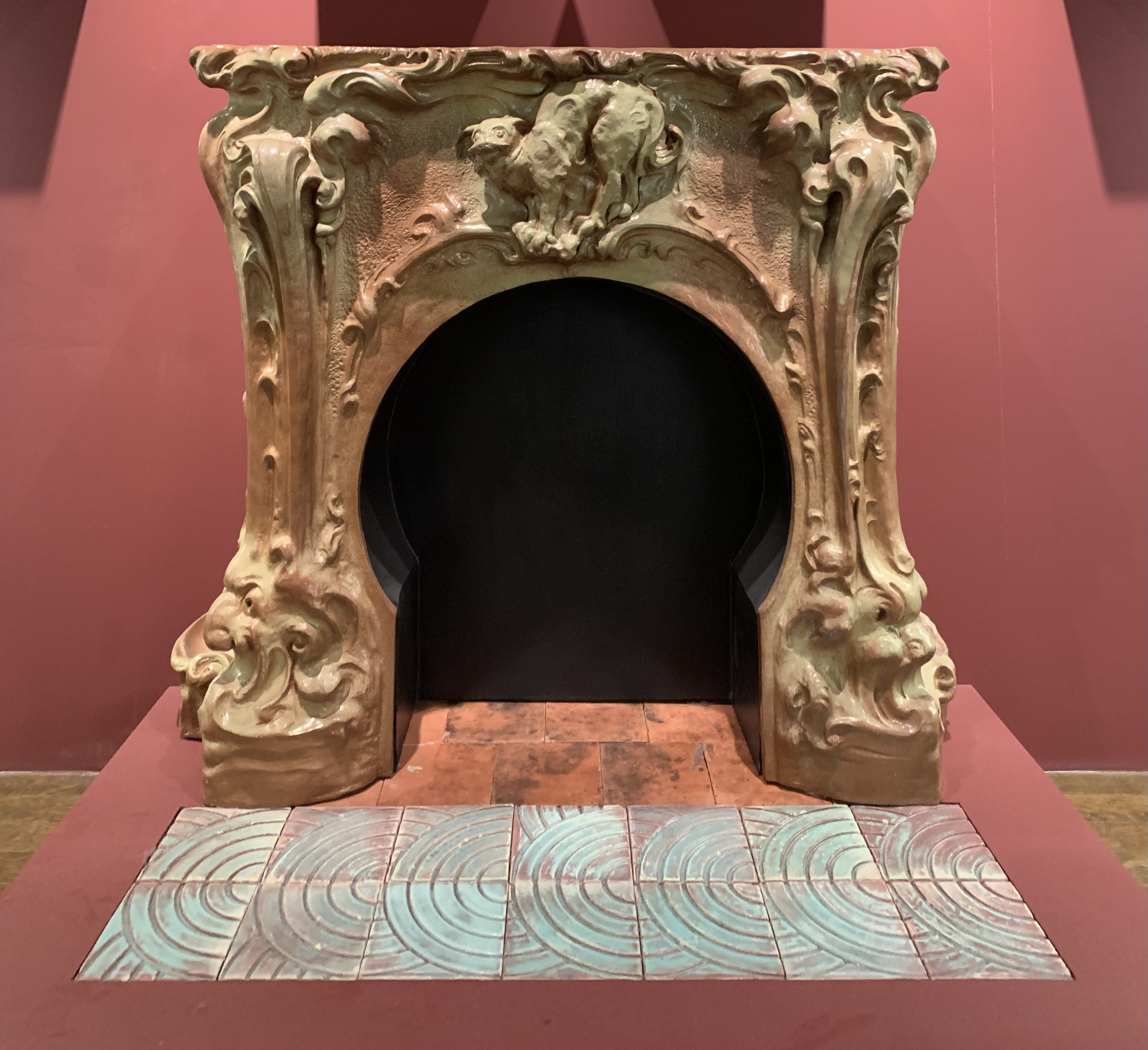
Fireplace mantel, attributed to Émile Müller (c. 1904), Museum of Decorative Arts, Paris

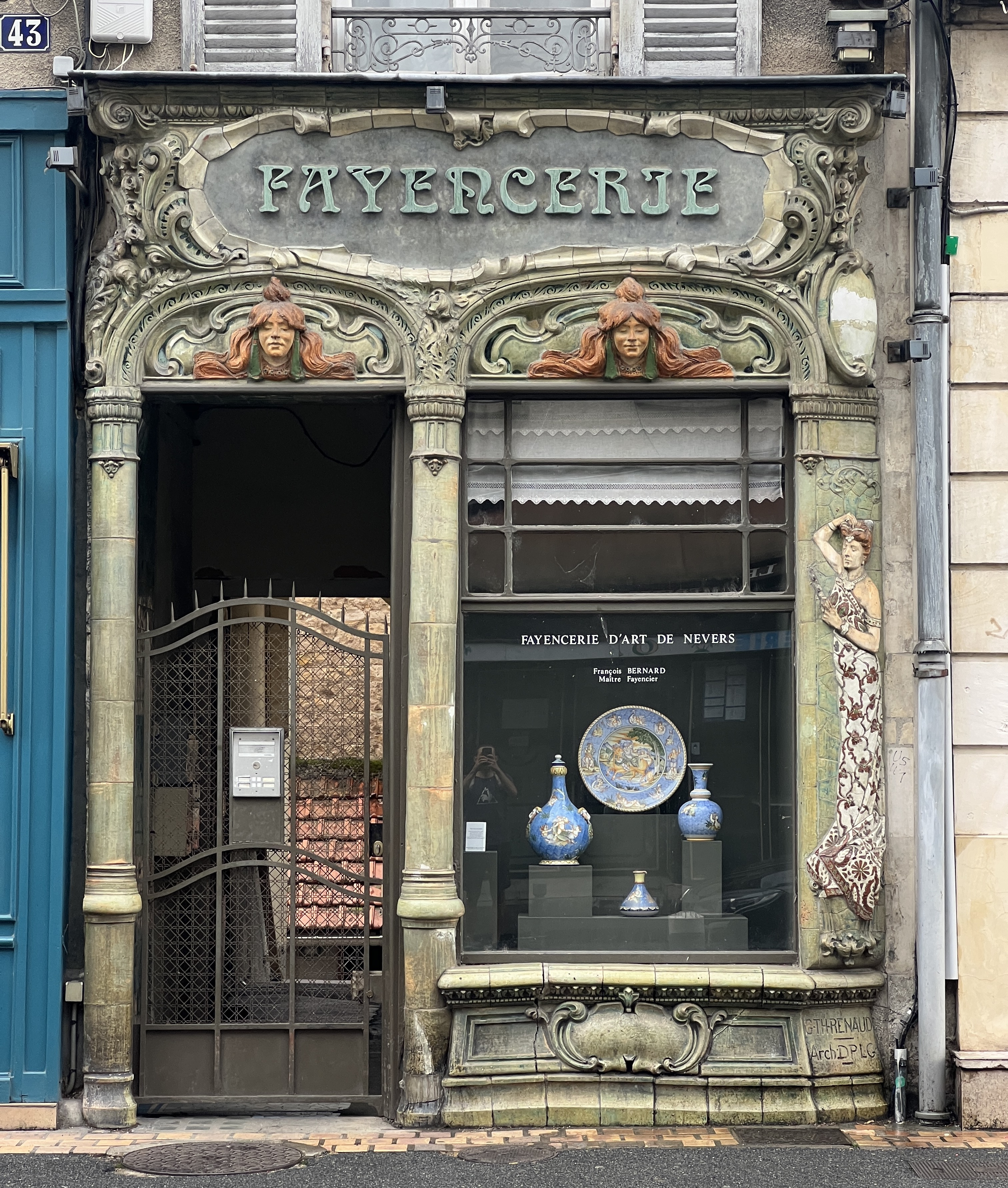
Facade of Avenue Charles-de-Gaulle no. 43, Nevers, France, by Georges-Théodore Renaud (architect) and Alexandre Bigot (ceramist) (1905)

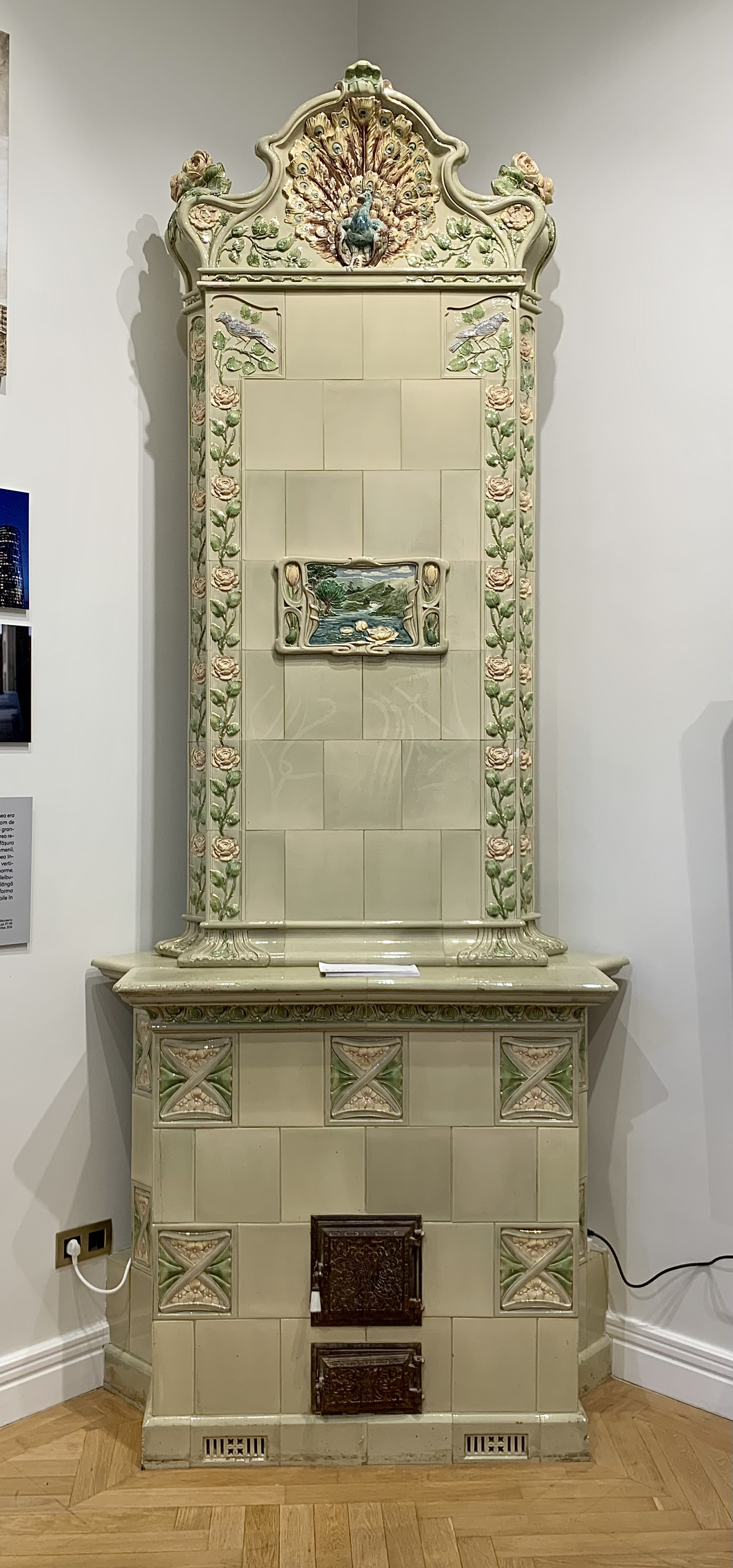
Polychrome tiled stove in the Mița the Cyclist House (Strada Biserica Amzei no. 9) in Bucharest, by Nicolae C. Mihăescu (1908)

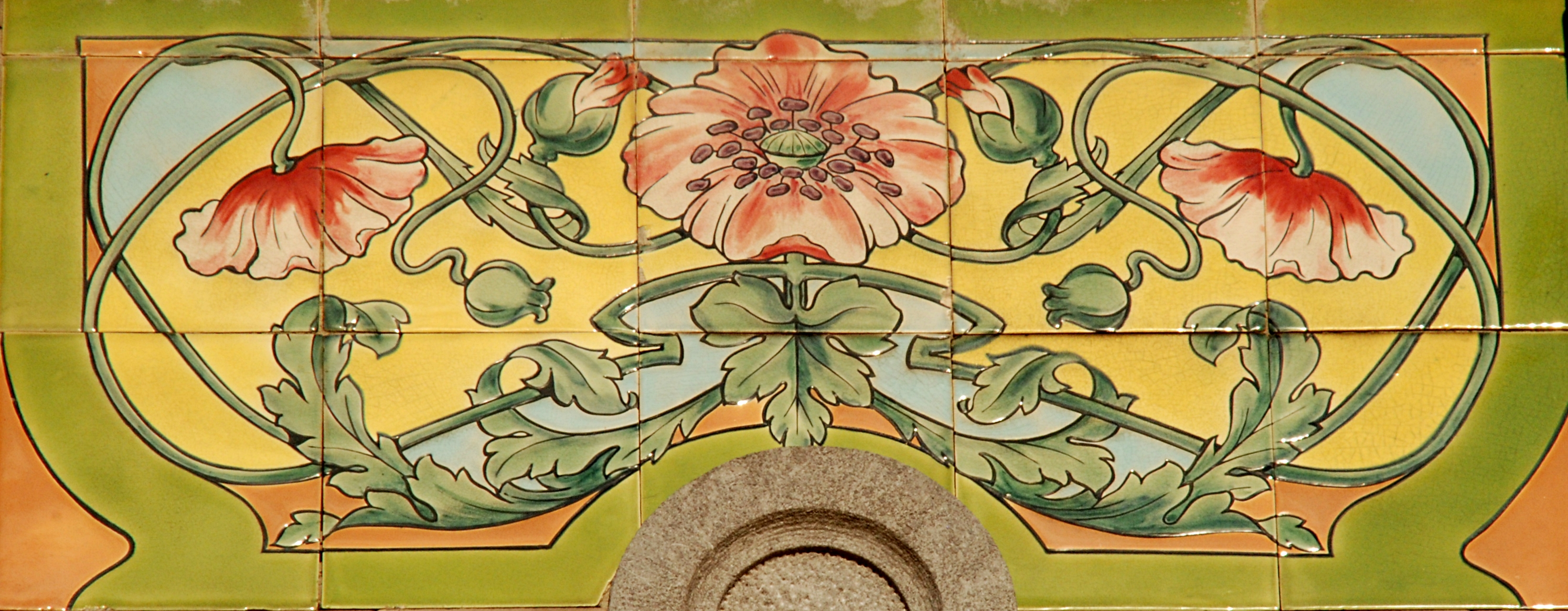
Panel on the façade of Genval railway station in Rixensart, Belgium, designed by architect G. De Lulle (1910)

Ceramic art, including faience, was another flourishing domain for Art Nouveau artists, in the English-speaking countries falling under the wider art pottery movement. The last part of the 19th century saw many technological innovations in the manufacture of ceramics, particularly the development of high temperature (grand feu) ceramics with crystallised and matte glazes. At the same time, several lost techniques, such as sang de boeuf glaze, were rediscovered. Art Nouveau ceramics were also influenced by traditional and modern Japanese and Chinese ceramics, whose vegetal and floral motifs fitted well with the Art Nouveau style. In France, artists also rediscovered the traditional stoneware (grés) methods and reinvented them with new motifs.

Émile Gallé, in Nancy, created earthenware works in natural earth colors with naturalistic themes of plants and insects. Ceramics also found an important new use in architecture: Art Nouveau architects, Jules Lavirotte and Hector Guimard among them, began to decorate the façades of buildings with architectural ceramics, many of them made by the firm of Alexandre Bigot, giving them a distinct Art Nouveau sculptural look.

One of the pioneer French Art Nouveau ceramists was Ernest Chaplet, whose career in ceramics spanned thirty years. He began producing stoneware influenced by Japanese and Chinese prototypes. Beginning in 1886, he worked with painter Paul Gauguin on stoneware designs with applied figures, multiple handles, painted and partially glazed, and collaborated with sculptors Félix Bracquemond, Jules Dalou and Auguste Rodin. His works were acclaimed at the 1900 Exposition.

The major national ceramics firms had an important place at the 1900 Paris Exposition: the Manufacture nationale de Sèvres outside Paris; Nymphenburg, Meissen, Villeroy & Boch in Germany, and Doulton in Britain. Other leading French ceramists included Taxile Doat, Pierre-Adrien Dalpayrat, Edmond Lachenal, Albert Dammouse and Auguste Delaherche.

In France, Art Nouveau ceramics sometimes crossed the line into sculpture. The porcelain figurine Dancer with a Scarf by Agathon Léonard, made for the Manufacture nationale de Sèvres, won recognition in both categories at the 1900 Paris Exposition.

The Zsolnay factory in Pécs, Hungary, was founded by Miklós Zsolnay (1800–1880) in 1853 and led by his son, Vilmos Zsolnay (1828–1900) with chief designer Tádé Sikorski (1852–1940) to produce stoneware and other ceramics. In 1893, Zsolnay introduced porcelain pieces made of eosin. He led the factory to worldwide recognition by demonstrating its innovative products at world fairs and international exhibitions, including the 1873 World Fair in Vienna, then at the 1878 World Fair in Paris, where Zsolnay received a Grand Prix. Frost-resisting Zsolnay building decorations were used in numerous buildings, specifically during the Art Nouveau movement.

Ceramic tiles were also a distinctive feature of Portuguese Arte Nova that continued the long azulejo tradition of the country.

==== Mosaics ====
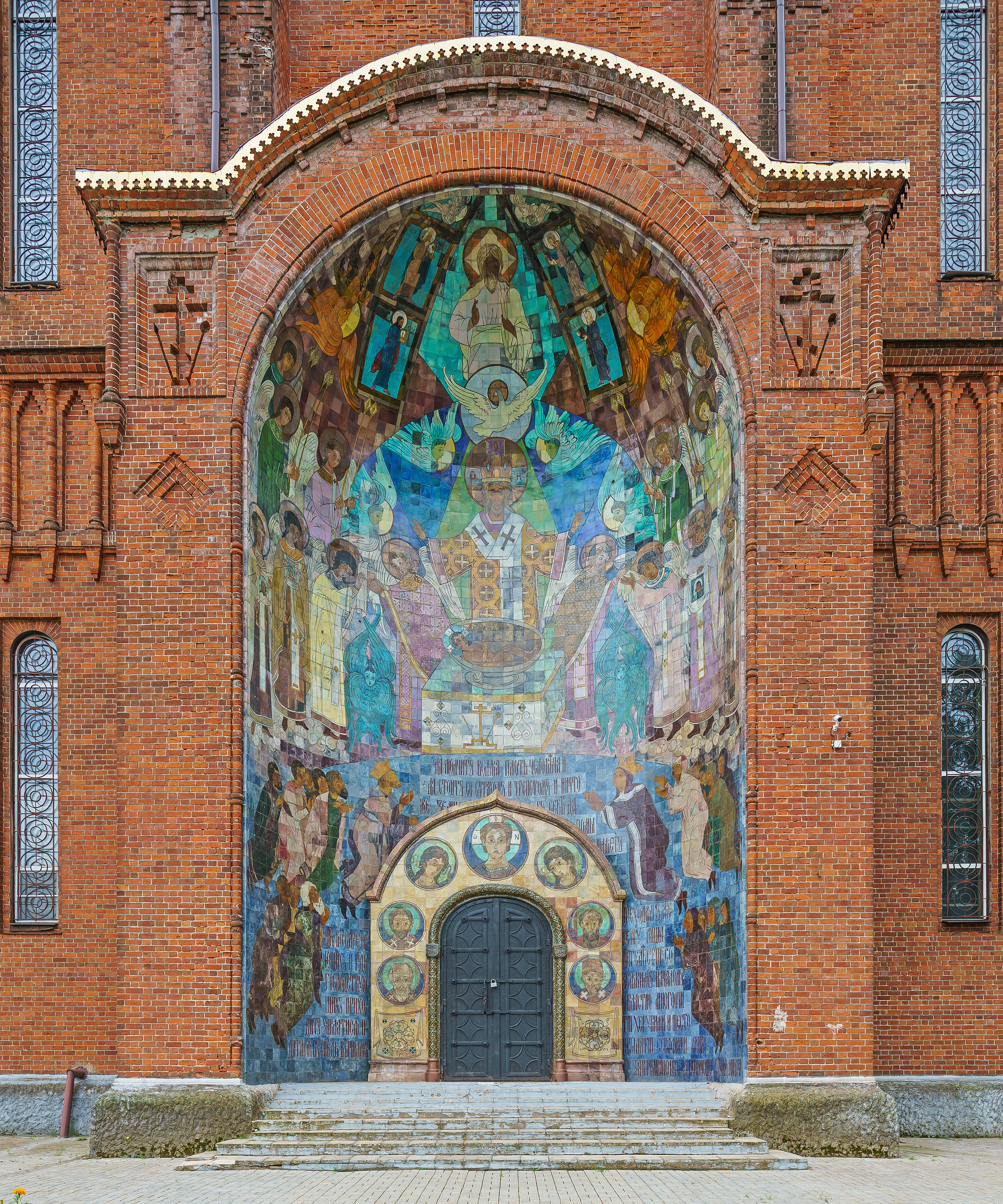
Maiolica mural of Abramtsevo Colony, Russia (1870s–1890s)

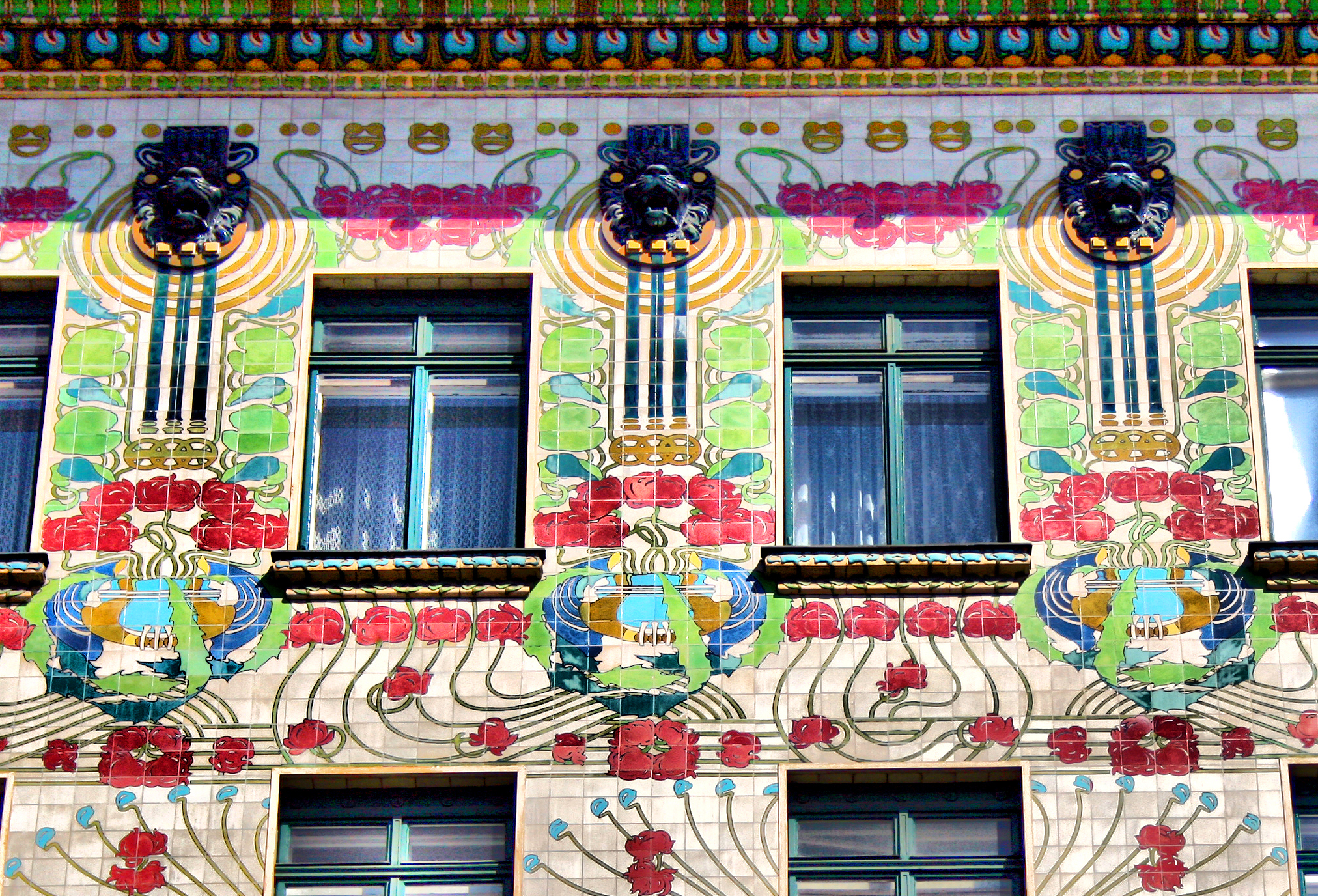
Majolica House in Vienna by Otto Wagner (1898)

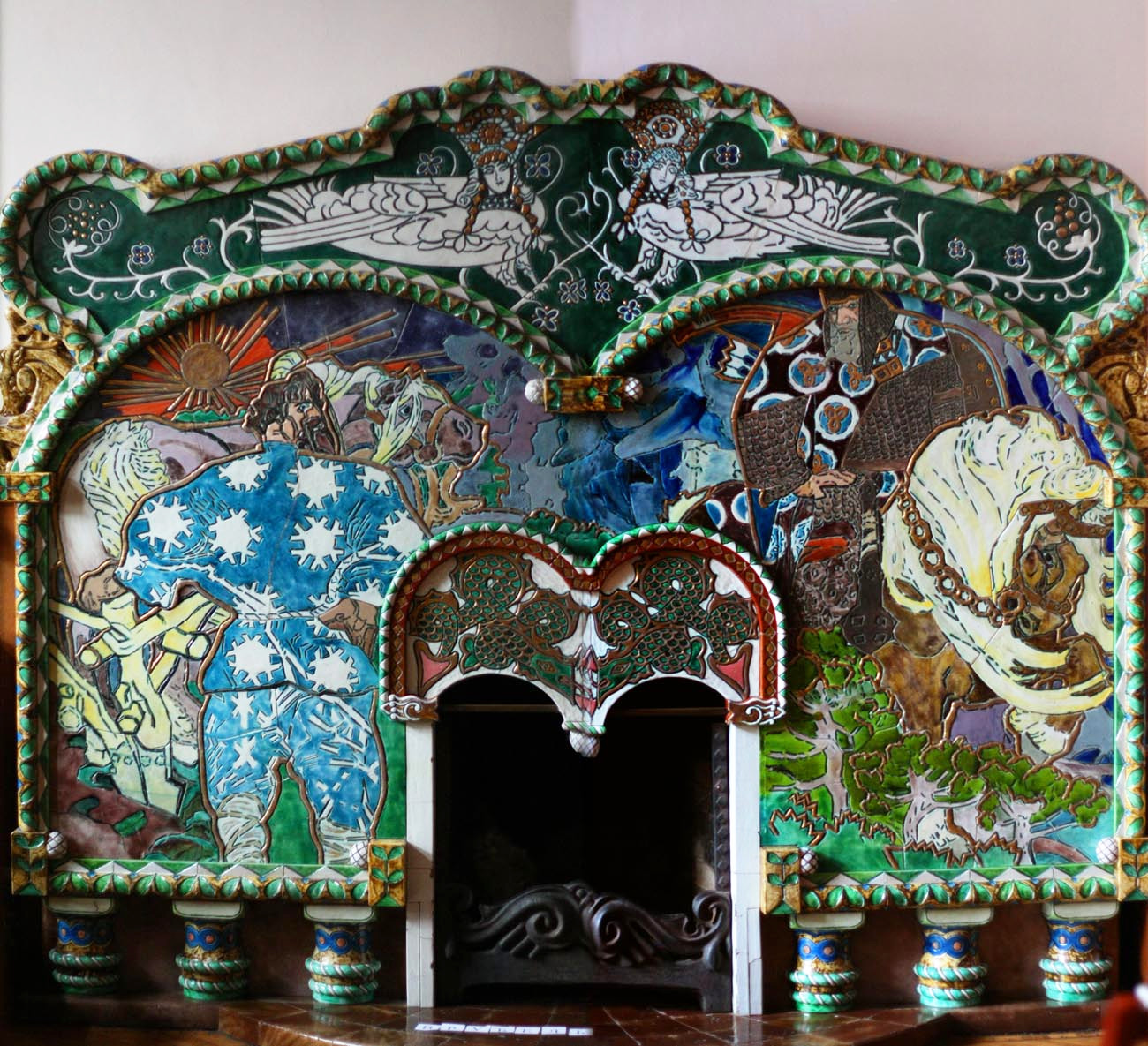
Majolica fireplace, house of Bazhanov, Abramtsevo Colony, by Mikhail Vrubel (1898)

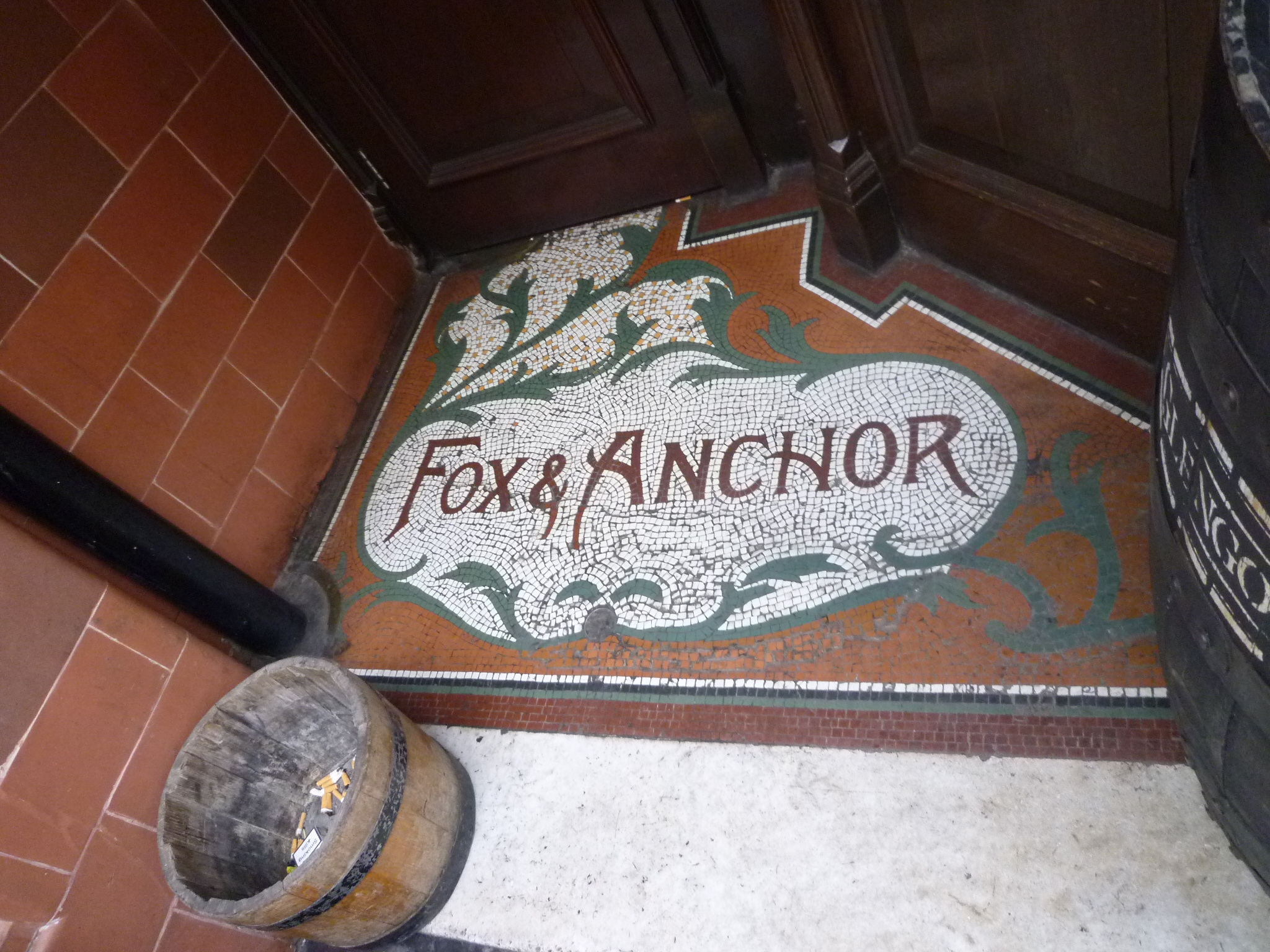
Mosaics of Fox and Anchor pub in London by William James Neatby (1898)

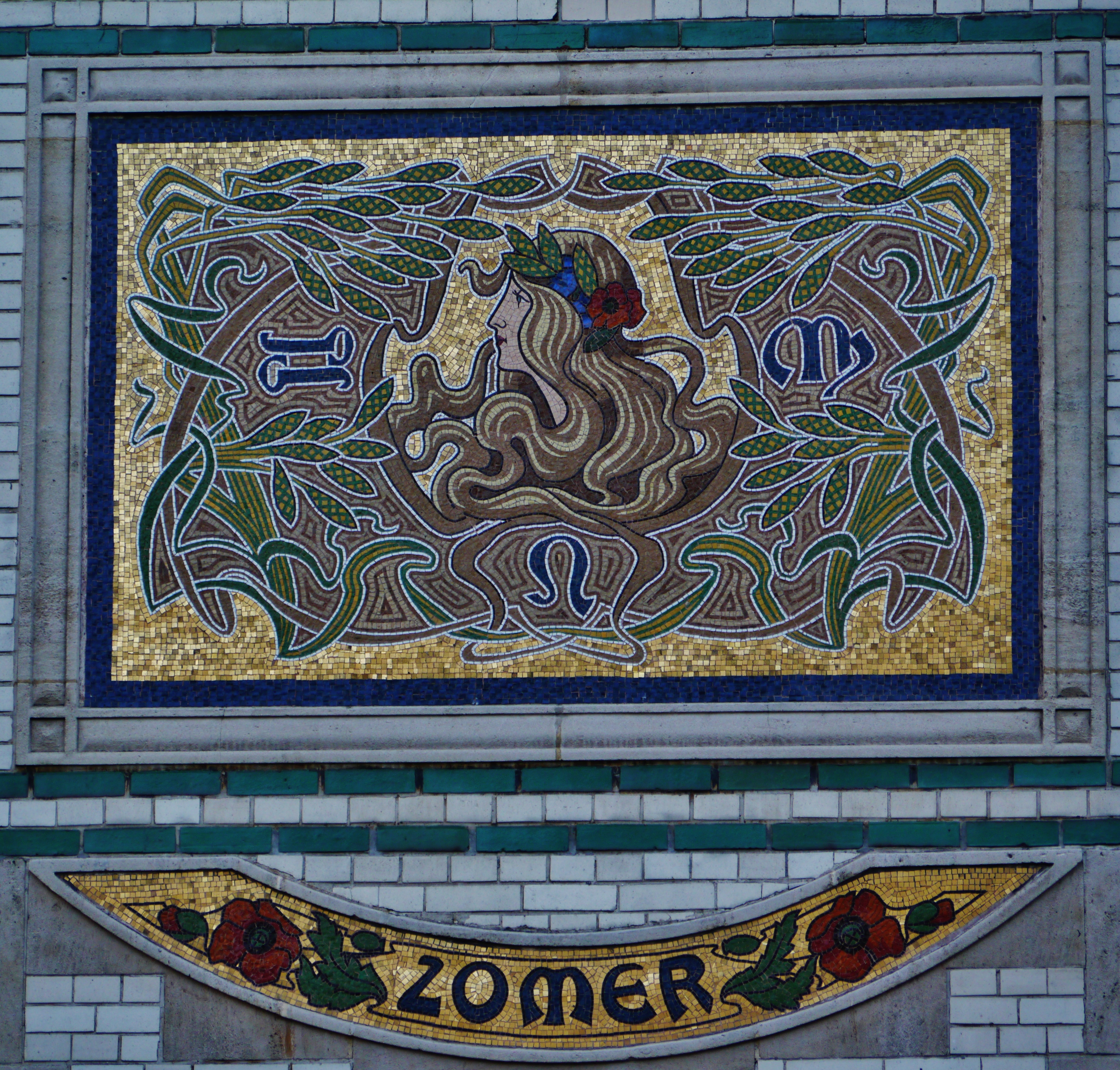
Mosaic which portrays summer as a woman, with a neo-Byzantine golden background, in Antwerp, Belgium

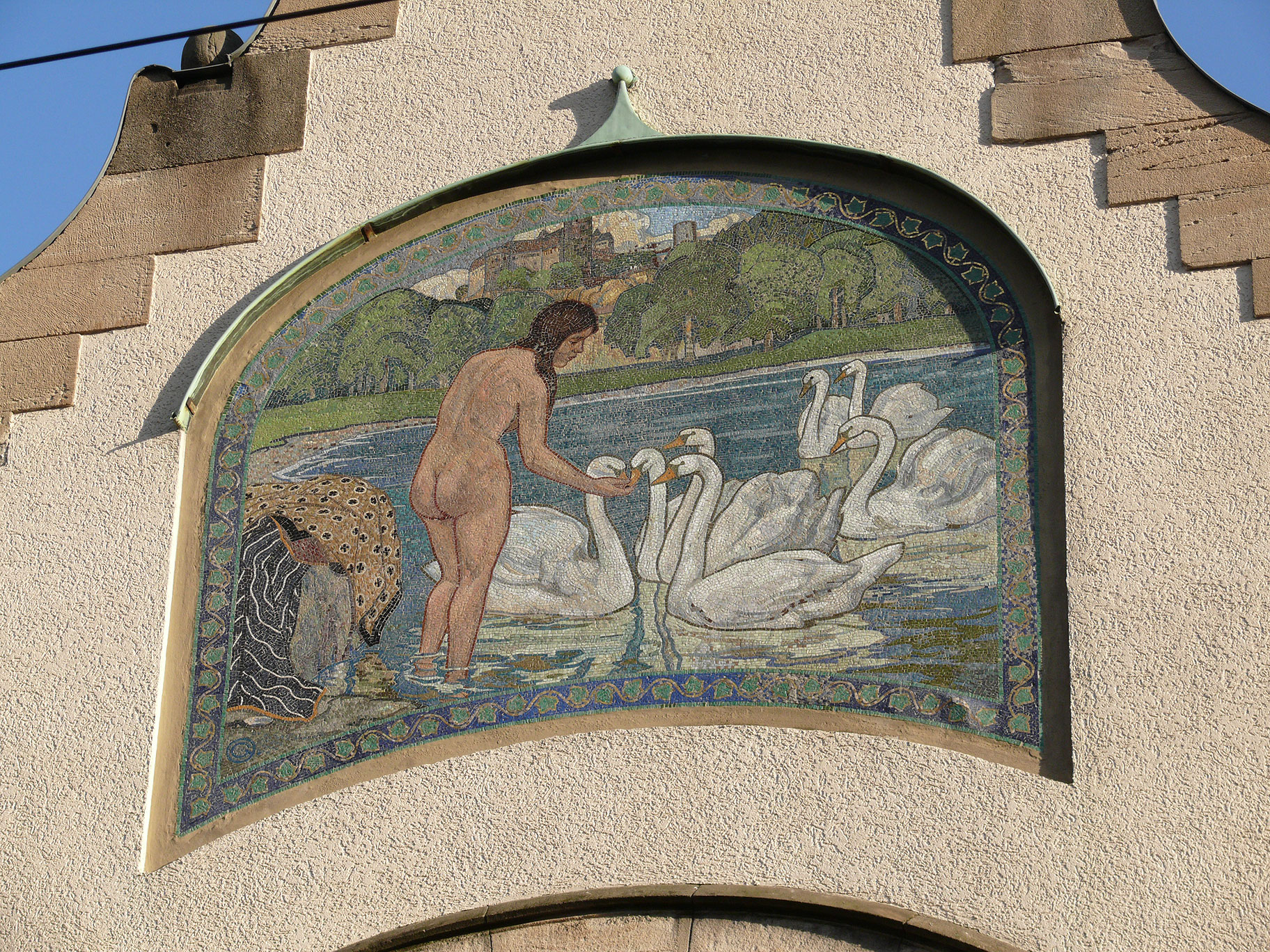
Mosaics designed by Oskar Graf for Merkel’sches Schwimmbad in Esslingen am Neckar, Germany (1905–1907)

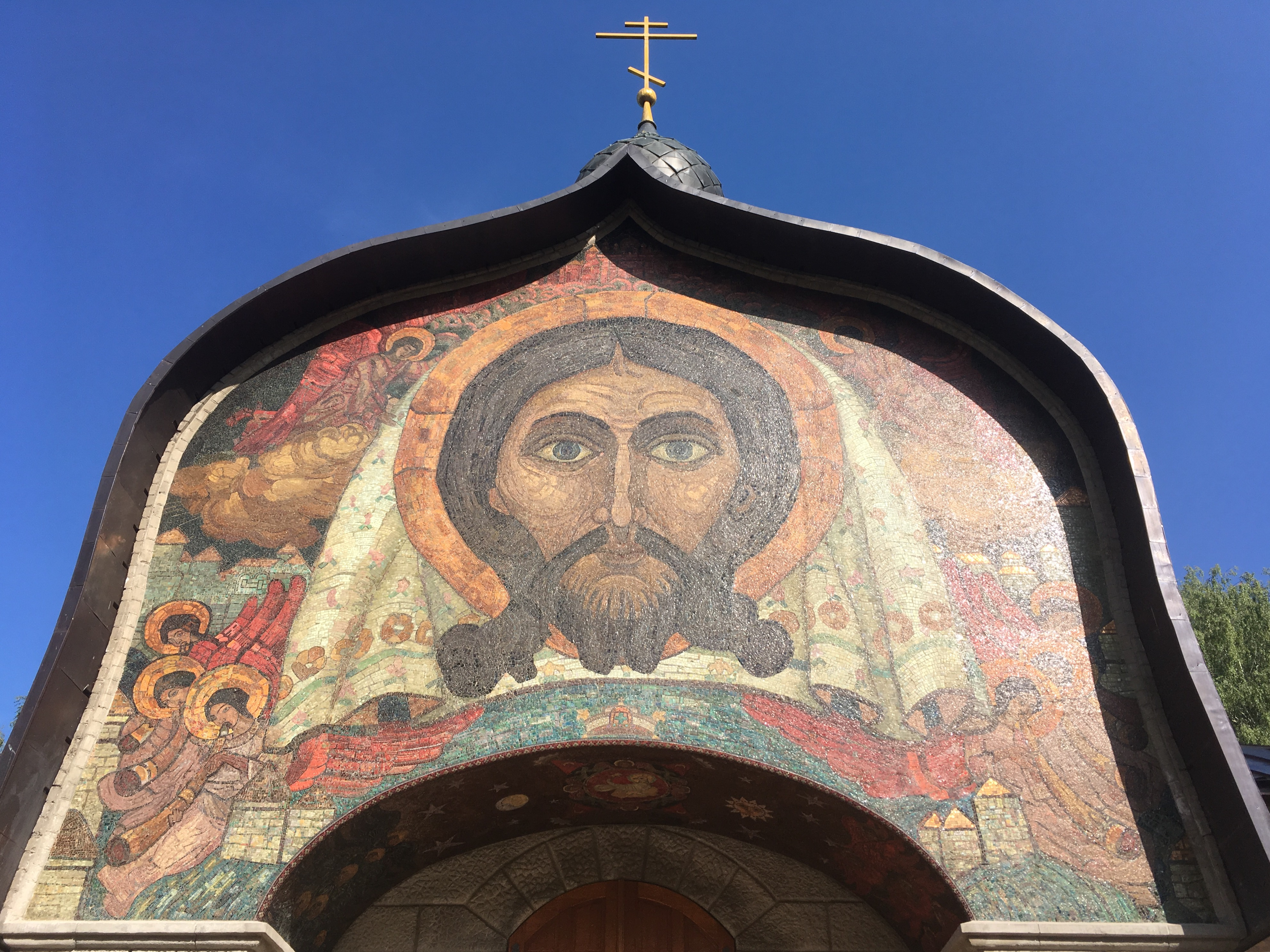
Mandylion by Nicholas Roerich in Talashkino, Russia (1908–1914)

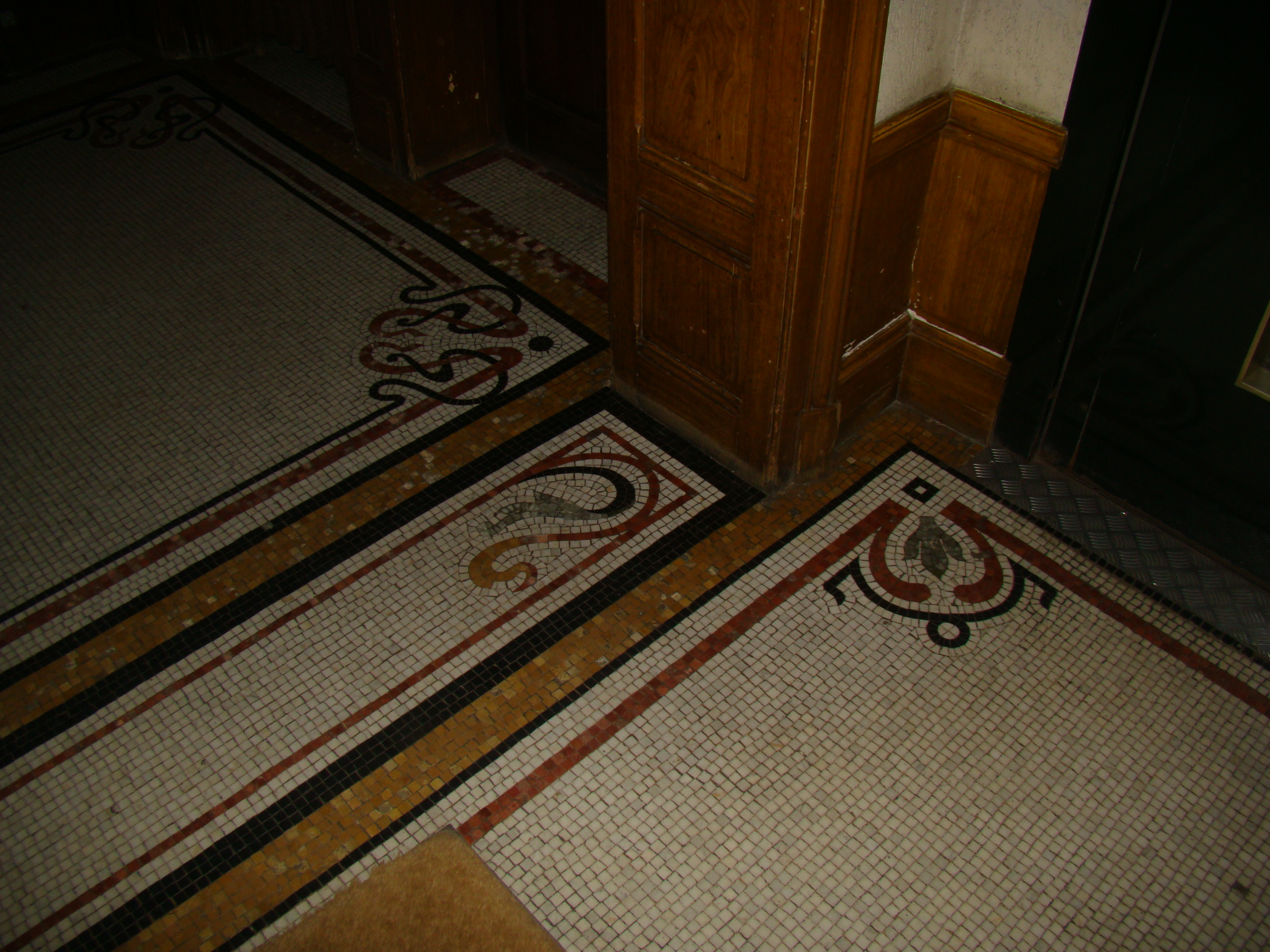
Mosaic floors in Quai Duguay-Trouin no. 30 in Rennes, France, designed by Emmanuel Le Ray (c. 1910)

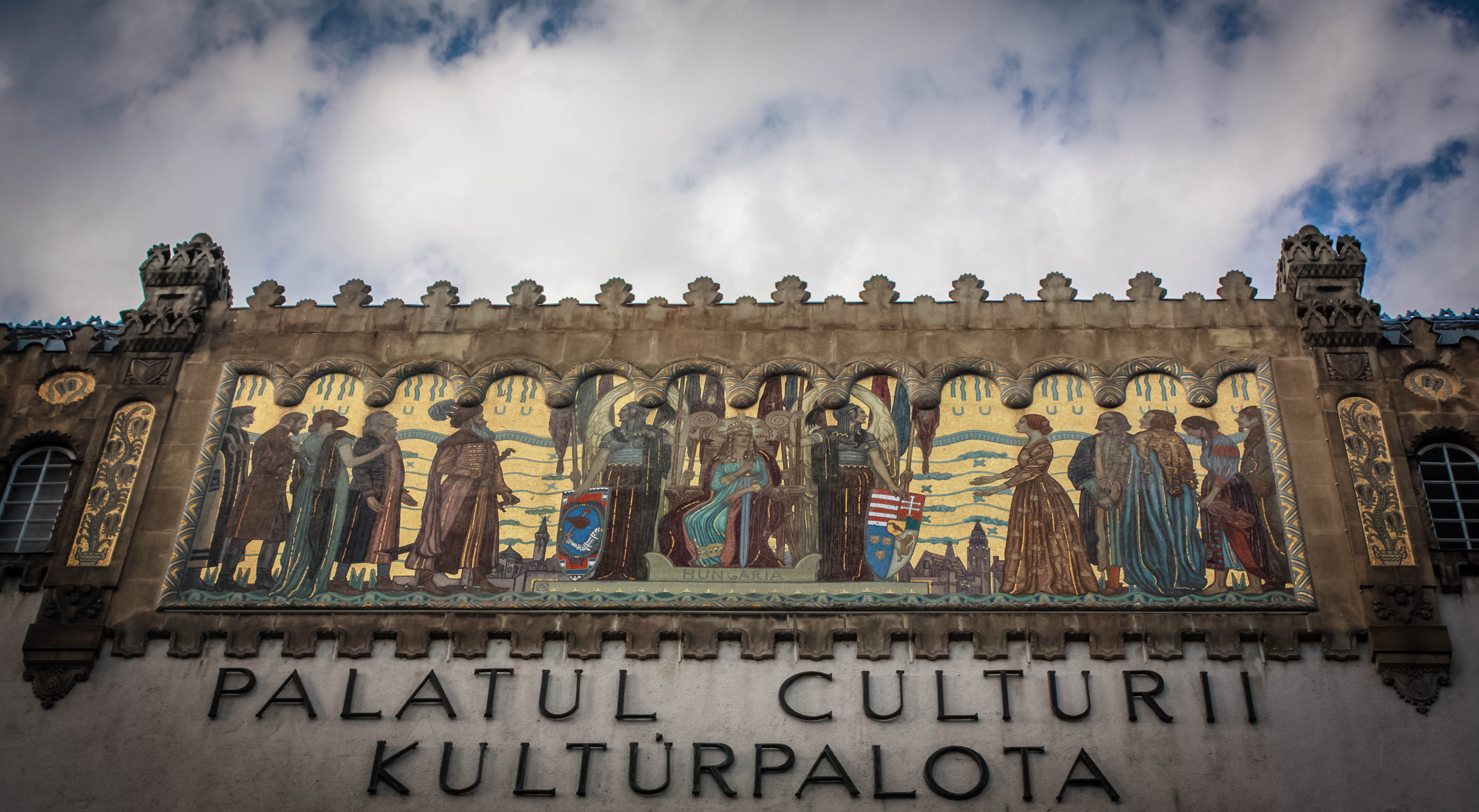
Mosaics for Palace of Culture in Târgu Mureș, Romania by Aladár Körösfői-Kriesch and Miksa Róth (1911–1913)

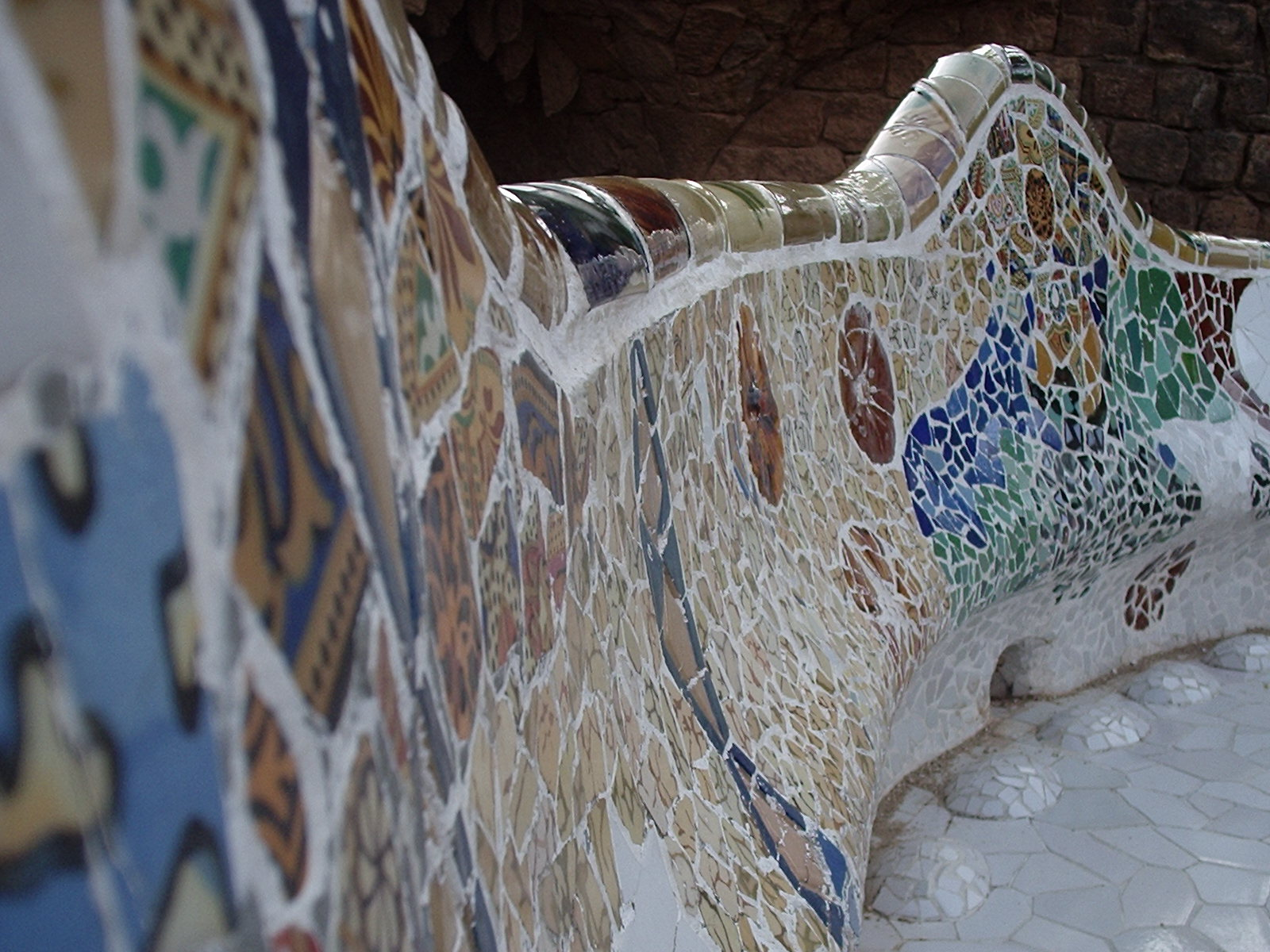
Trencadís mosaics in Park Güell, Barcelona, by Antoni Gaudí (1914)

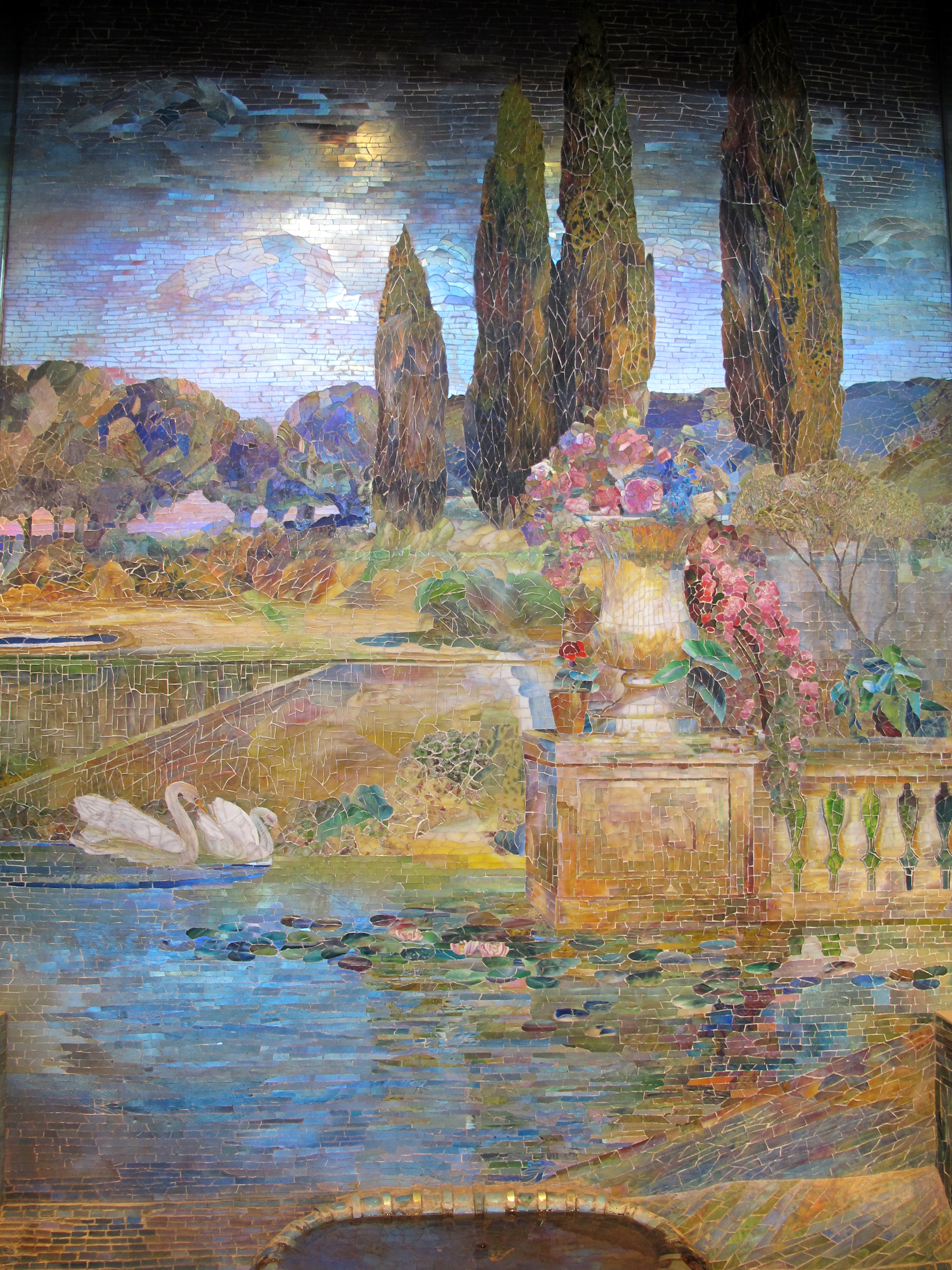
Mosaics by Louis Comfort Tiffany (1915)

Mosaics were used by many Art Nouveau artists of different movements, especially of Catalan Modernisme (Hospital de Sant Pau, Palau de la Música Catalana, Casa Lleó-Morera and many others). Antoni Gaudí invented a new technique in the treatment of materials called trencadís, which used waste ceramic pieces.

Colourful Maiolica tile in floral designs were a distinctive feature of the Majolica House in Vienna by Otto Wagner, (1898) and of the buildings of the works of the Russian Abramtsevo Colony, especially those by Mikhail Vrubel.

=== Textiles and wallpaper ===
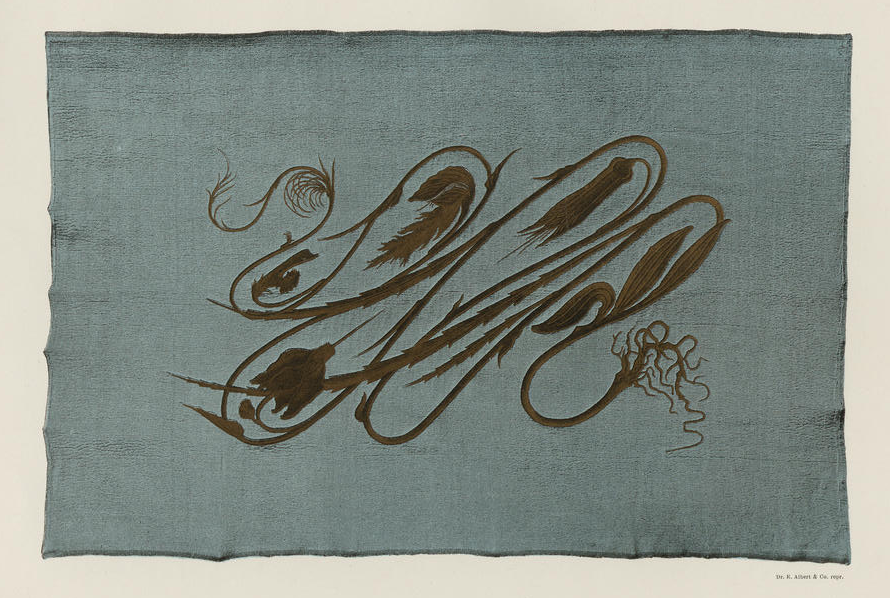
Silk and wool tapestry design, Cyclamen, by Hermann Obrist, an early example of the Whiplash motif based on the stem of a cyclamen flower (1895)

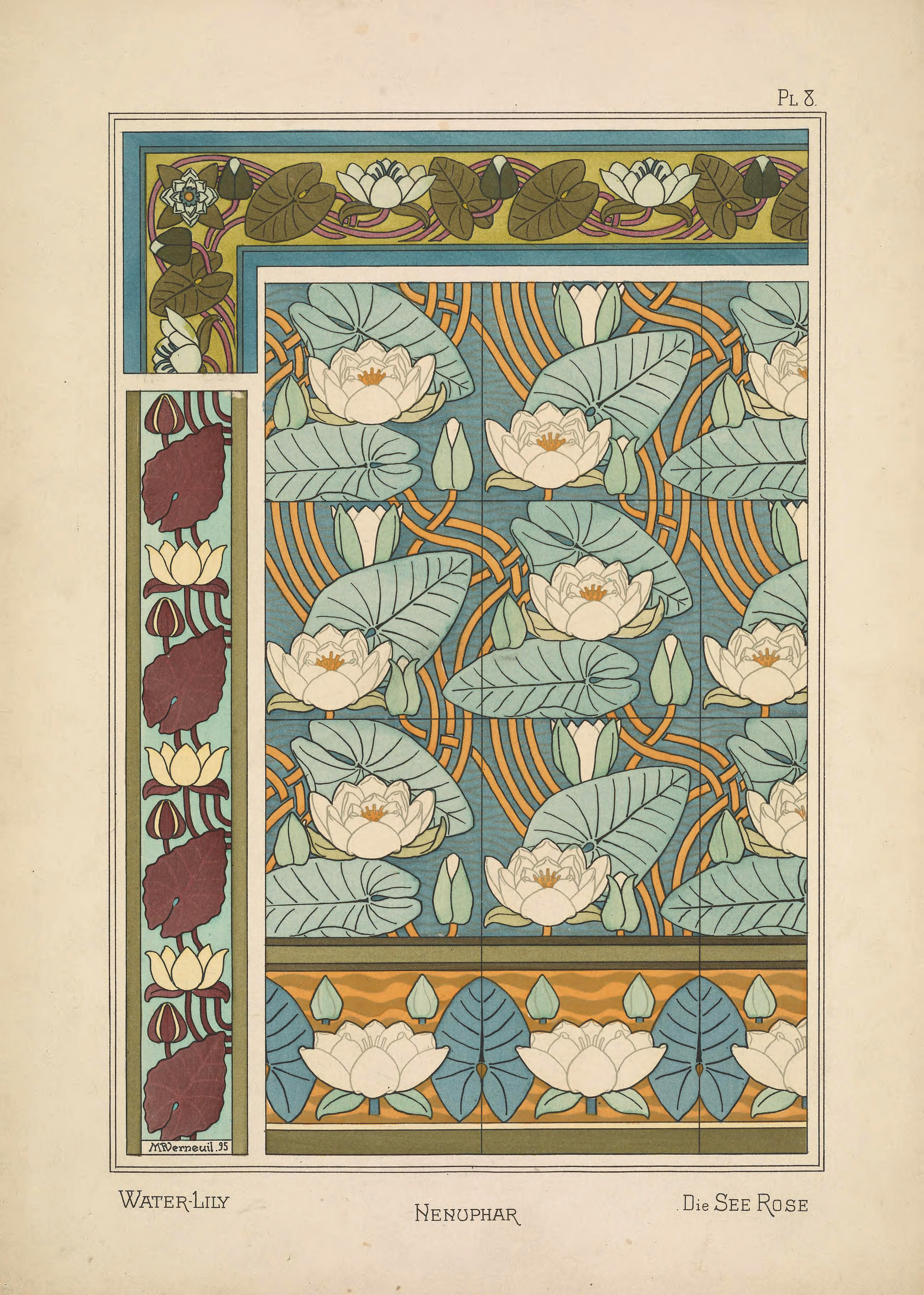
Page on the Water Lily, from the book by Eugène Grasset on ornamental uses of flowers (1899)

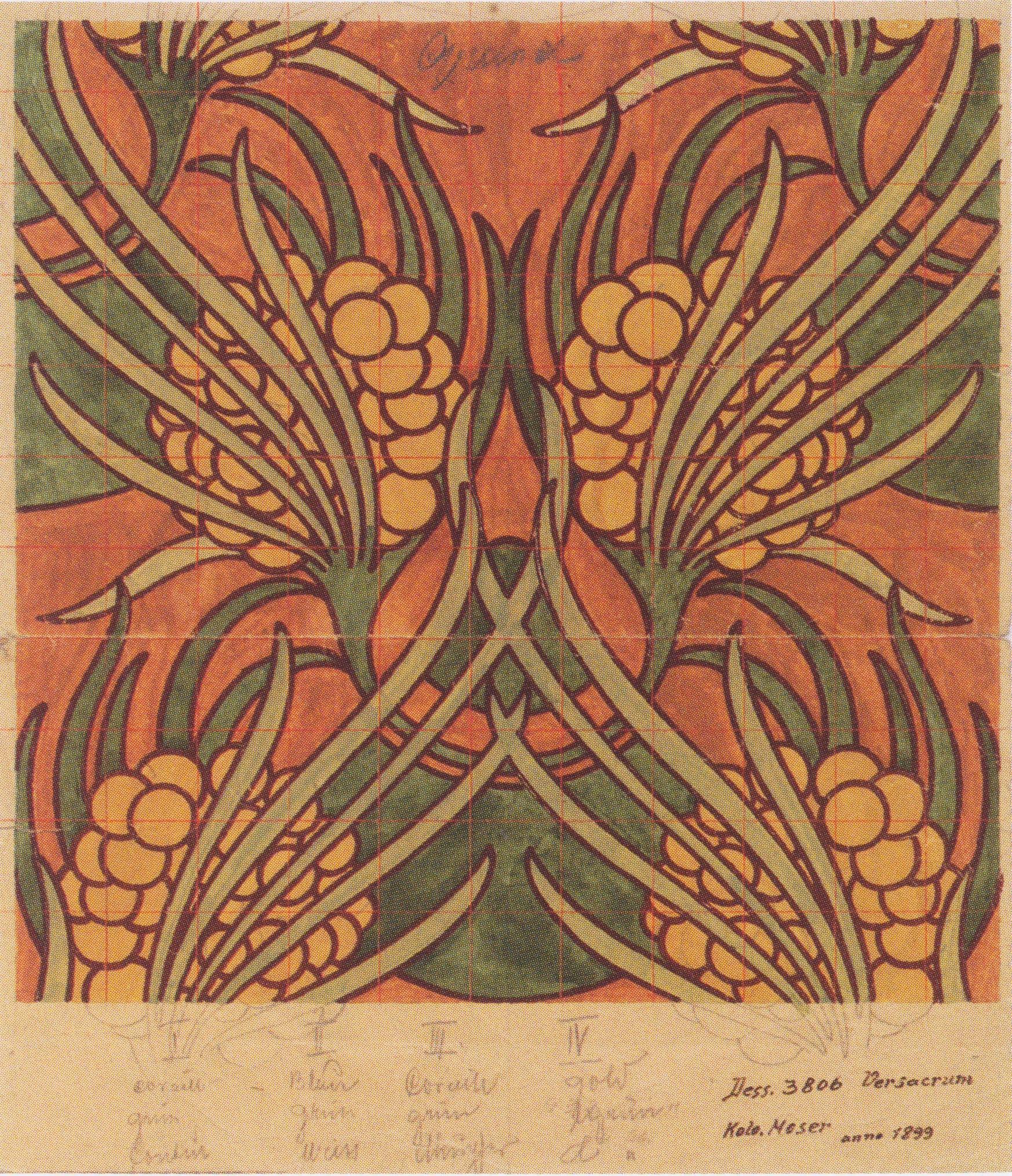
Textile design by Koloman Moser (1899)

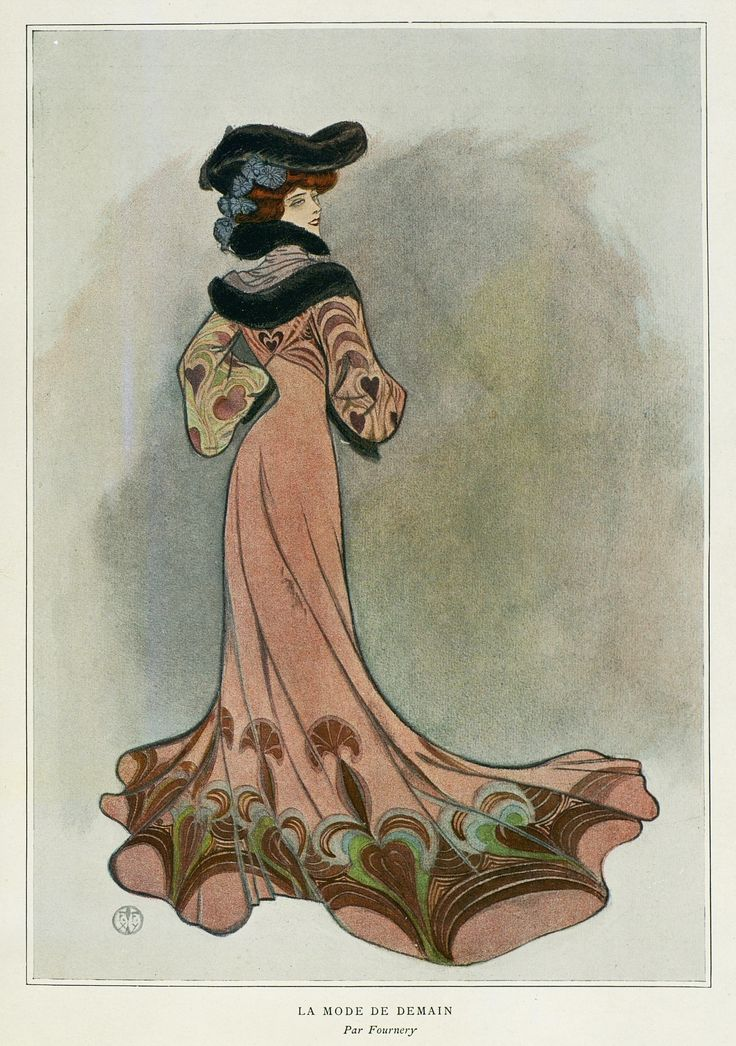
Fashion plate by Félix Fournery (c.1900)

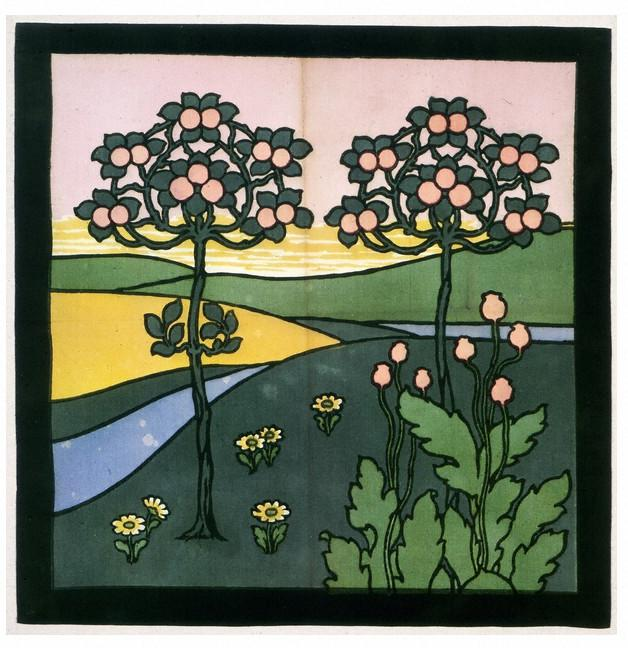
Printed cotton from the Silver Studio, for Liberty department store (1904)

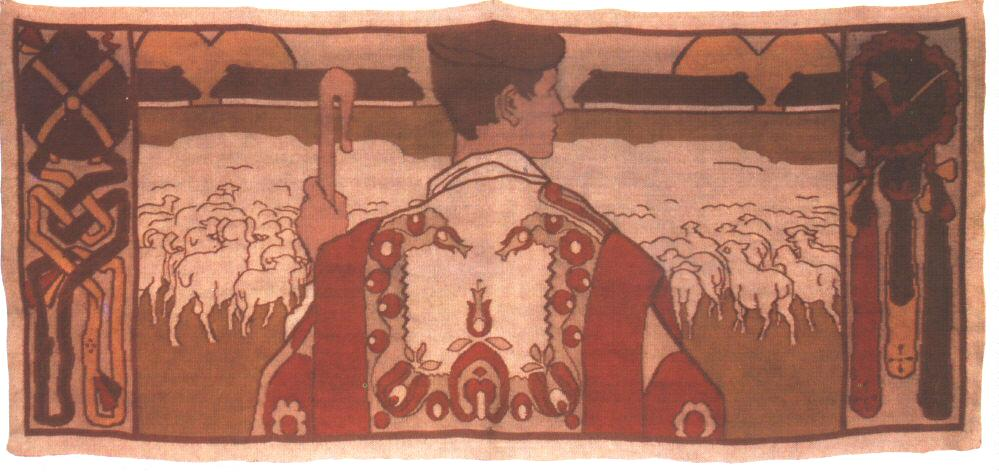
The Shepherd tapestry by János Vaszary (1906) combined Art Nouveau motifs and a traditional Hungarian folk theme

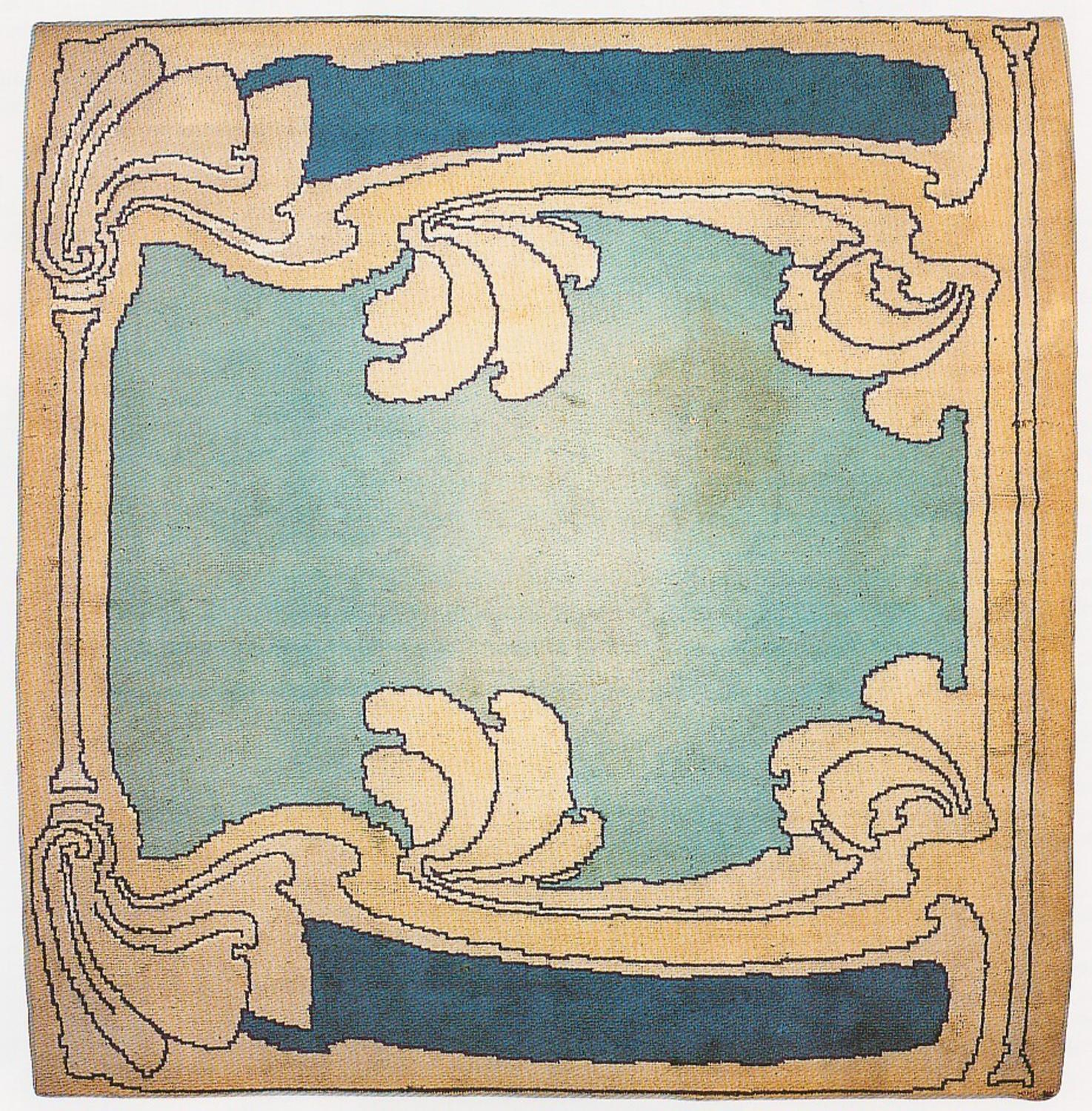
A carpet by Victor Horta in the collection of the King Baudouin Foundation

Textiles and wallpapers were an important vehicle of Art Nouveau from the beginning of the style, and an essential element of Art Nouveau interior design. In Britain, the textile designs of William Morris had helped launch the Arts and Crafts movement and then Art Nouveau. Many designs were created for the Liberty department store in London, which popularized the style throughout Europe. One such designer was the Silver Studio, which provided colourful stylised floral patterns. Other distinctive designs came from Glasgow School, and Margaret Macdonald Mackintosh. The Glasgow school introduced several distinctive motifs, including stylised eggs, geometric forms and the "Rose of Glasgow".

In France, a major contribution was made by designer Eugène Grasset who in 1896 published La Plante et ses applications ornamentales, suggesting Art Nouveau designs based on different flowers and plants. Many patterns were designed for and produced by for the major French textile manufacturers in Mulhouse, Lille and Lyon, by German and Belgian workshops. The German designer Hermann Obrist specialized in floral patterns, particularly the cyclamen and the "whiplash" style based on flower stems, which became a major motif of the style. The Belgian Henry van de Velde presented a textile work, La Veillée d'Anges, at the Salon La Libre Esthéthique in Brussels, inspired by the symbolism of Paul Gauguin and of the Nabis. In the Netherlands, textiles were often inspired by batik patterns from the Dutch colonies in the East Indies. Folk art also inspired the creation of tapestries, carpets, embroidery and textiles in Central Europe and Scandinavia, in the work of Gerhard Munthe and Frida Hansen in Norway. The Five Swans design of Otto Eckmann appeared in more than one hundred different versions. The Hungarian designer János Vaszary combined Art Nouveau elements with folkloric themes.

== Museums ==
There are 4 types of museums featuring Art Nouveau heritage:

- Broad-scope museums (not specifically dedicated to Art Nouveau but with a large collection of items in this style). Art Nouveau monuments are italicised;
- House-museums of Art Nouveau artists (all but Alphonse Mucha museum are Art Nouveau monuments);
- Museums dedicated to local Art Nouveau movements (all are Art Nouveau monuments);
- Other Art Nouveau buildings with museum status or featuring a museum inside (not dedicated to local Art Nouveau movements/specific artists).

| Country | Broad-scope museums | House-museums of Art Nouveau artists | Museums dedicated to local Art Nouveau movements | Other Art Nouveau buildings with museum status or featuring a museum inside |
|---|---|---|---|---|
| Austria | Museum of Applied Arts in Vienna | | Secession Building in Vienna | Wagner Pavilions at Karlsplatz and Hietzing in Vienna |
| Argentina | | | | Juan Carlos Castagnino Municipal Museum of Art in Mar del Plata |
| Belgium | Fin-de-Siècle Museum in Brussels, Gilliot & Roelants Tile Museum in Hemiksem | Maison and Atelier Horta and Cauchie House in Brussels | | Belgian Comic Strip Center, Musical Instrument Museum and Autrique House in Brussels |
| Chile | | | | Palacio Baburizza in Valparaíso |
| Czech Republic | East Bohemian Museum in Hradec Králové | Alphonse Mucha Museum in Prague | | Museum of Modern Art in Olomouc |
| Denmark | Museum Sønderjylland in Skærbæk | | | |
| France | Musée d'Orsay, Museum of Decorative Arts, Carnavalet Museum, Petit Palais in Paris; Musée historique in Haguenau; Musée d'art moderne et contemporain in Strasbourg, Museum of Fine Arts of Nancy | Villa Majorelle in Nancy; Musée Lalique in Wingen-sur-Moder | Museum of the Nancy School in Nancy | Maxim's Art Nouveau "Collection 1900" above Maxim's restaurant in Paris (groups of twenty or more persons only) |
| Finland | Ateneum and Finnish National Museum in Helsinki, Turku Art Museum in Turku | Hvitträsk (house of Herman Gesellius, Armas Lindgren, and Eliel Saarinen) in Kirkkonummi and Gallen-Kallela Museum in Espoo | | |
| Germany | Bröhan Museum in Berlin, Museum in der Majolika in Karlsruhe, Landesmuseum in Mainz, Museum Wiesbaden in Wiesbaden | | Darmstadt Colony Museum in Darmstadt | Osthaus Museum in Hagen |
| Hungary | Museum of Applied Arts and its branch Villa György Ráth in Budapest, Town museum in Gödöllő | Miksa Róth House museum in Budapest | House of Hungarian Szecesszió in Budapest | Geological Museum in Budapest |
| Italy | Municipal museum in Casale Monferrato | | | Villa Bernasconi in Cernobbio |
| Latvia | | | Riga Art Nouveau Museum in Riga | |
| Mexico | | | | Museo del Objeto del Objeto in Mexico City |
| Norway | | | Jugendstil Centre in Ålesund | Norwegian Museum of Contemporary Art in Oslo |
| Portugal | | | Museum of Arte Nova in Aveiro | Museum-Residence of Dr. Anastácio Gonçalves in Lisbon |
| Romania | Székely National Museum in Sfântu Gheorghe, Pelișor Castle in Sinaia | | | Darvas-La Roche house in Oradea |
| Russia | Abramtsevo Colony in Moscow Oblast; All-Russian Decorative Art Museum and Gorky Museum in Moscow; State Russian Museum, Museum of Political History of Russia in Saint Petersburg | Fyodor Livchak House Museum in Ulyanovsk | Museum of Talashkino Art Colony in Flenovo, Smolensk Oblast (in Russian only) | Museum of Silver Age of Russian literature in Moscow, Museum of Modern in Samara, Estate of Aseevs in Tambov; Municipal Museum in Primorsk and Estate-museum of Scherbov in Gatchina (both Leningrad Oblast), Taganrog Museum of Architecture and Urbanism in Taganrog, Museum of Belle Epoque Architecture in Ulyanovsk |
| Serbia | Museum of Applied Art in Belgrade | | | Jovan Cvijić's House in Belgrade, Uros Predic's Studio in Belgrade, Synagogue in Novi Sad, Synagogue in Subotica, Raichle Palace in Subotica |
| Spain | National Art Museum of Catalonia in Barcelona, CaixaFòrum in Madrid, Museo Art Nouveau and Art Déco in Salamanca, Museu Agbar de les Aigües in Cornellà de Llobregat | Gaudí House Museum in Barcelona, Lluís Domènech i Montaner House-Museum in Canet de Mar | Museum of Catalan Modernisme in Barcelona, Art Nouveau House-Museum in Novelda | Sagrada Família, Hospital de Sant Pau, Casa Vicens in Barcelona |
| Sweden | | | | Biological museum in Stockholm, Röhsska Museum in Gothenburg |
| Switzerland | Musée des Beaux-Arts in La Chaux-de-Fonds | | | |
| UK | Victoria and Albert Museum in London; Kelvingrove Museum in Glasgow, Haworth Art Gallery in Accrington | Mackintosh House in Hunterian Museum and Art Gallery in Glasgow | | Horniman Museum in London |
| Ukraine | | | | Art Museum in Chernivtsi, Museum of Local Lore in Poltava |
| USA | Charles Hosmer Morse Museum of American Art in Winter Park, Florida, Metropolitan Museum of Art in New York City, Getty Center in Los Angeles; Cooper Hewitt, Smithsonian Design Museum in New York City, Art Institute of Chicago in Chicago | | | |

There are many other Art Nouveau buildings and structures that do not have museum status but can be officially visited for a fee or unofficially for free (e.g. railway stations, churches, cafes, restaurants, pubs, hotels, stores, offices, libraries, cemeteries, fountains as well as numerous apartment buildings that are still inhabited).

== Posterity ==
Criticized for "its primitive extravagances", Art Nouveau started to fade away after 1911. In histories of European architecture in the 20th century, from the 1930s to the 1950s, influential historians, like Nikolaus Pevsner, Sigfried Giedion and Henry-Russell Hitchcock, did not take Art Nouveau into consideration. This left the first versions of Pevsner's The Genius of European Architecture without a mention of Hector Guimard or Antoni Gaudí. The first major works dealing with Art Nouveau were published at the end of the 1950s, with Johnny Watser.

=== Influence on Art Deco ===
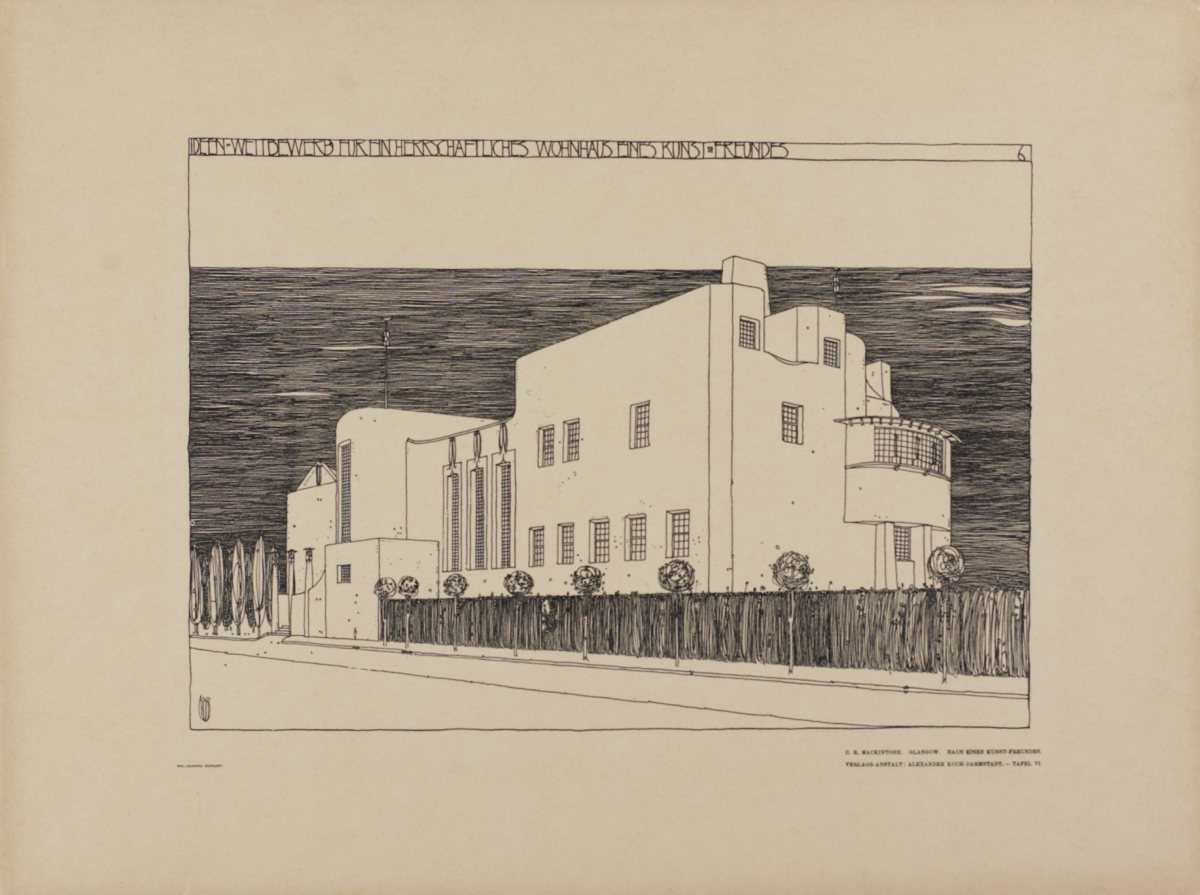
Entry for the House for an art lover competition, by Charles Rennie Mackintosh (1900)

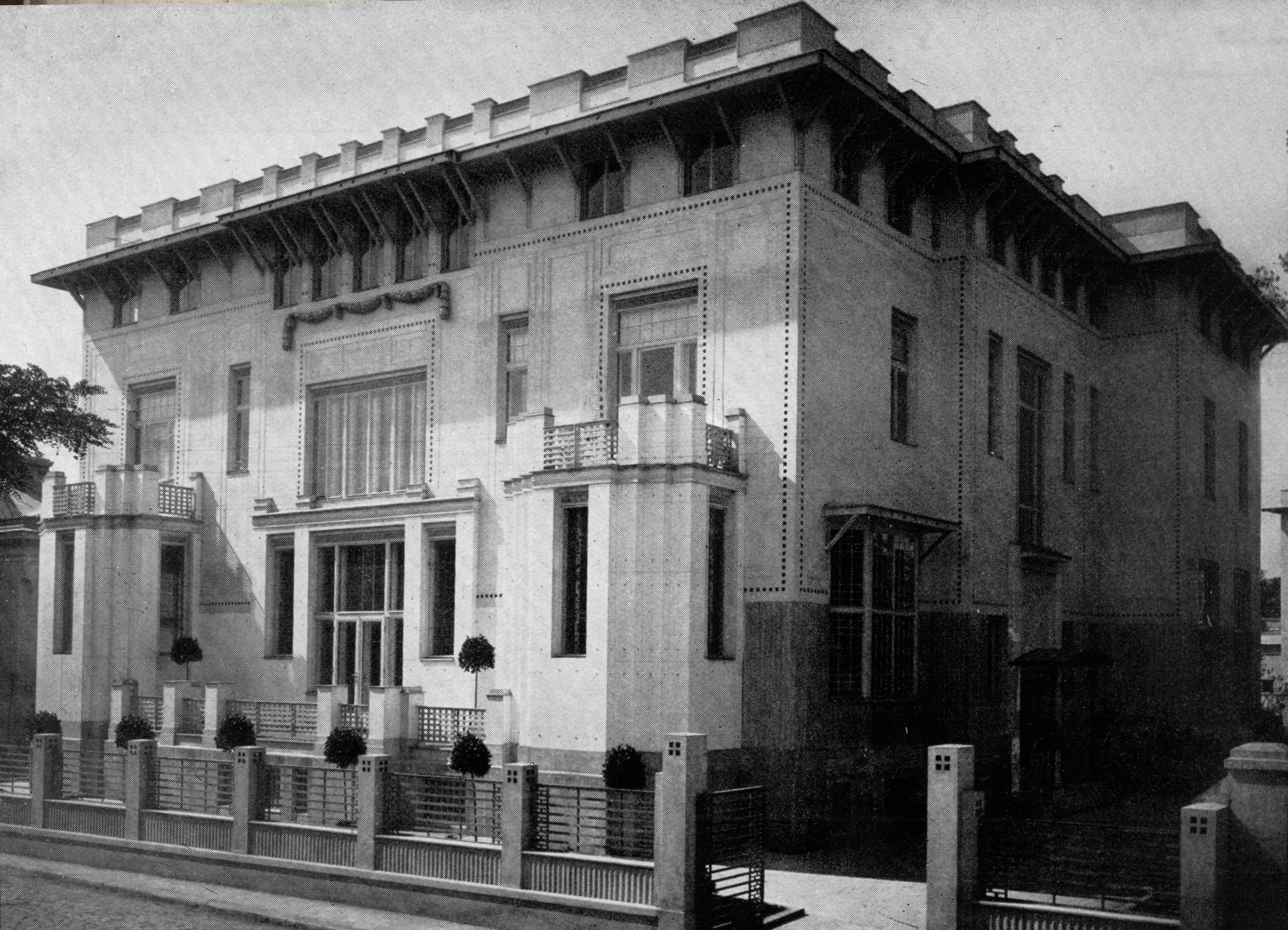
Secessionist exterior of the Bazil Assan House (Strada Scaune no. 21–23, currently Strada Tudor Arghezi) in Bucharest, by Marcel Kammerer (1902–1911), demolished in the late 1950s or the 1960s to make space for the National Theatre Bucharest

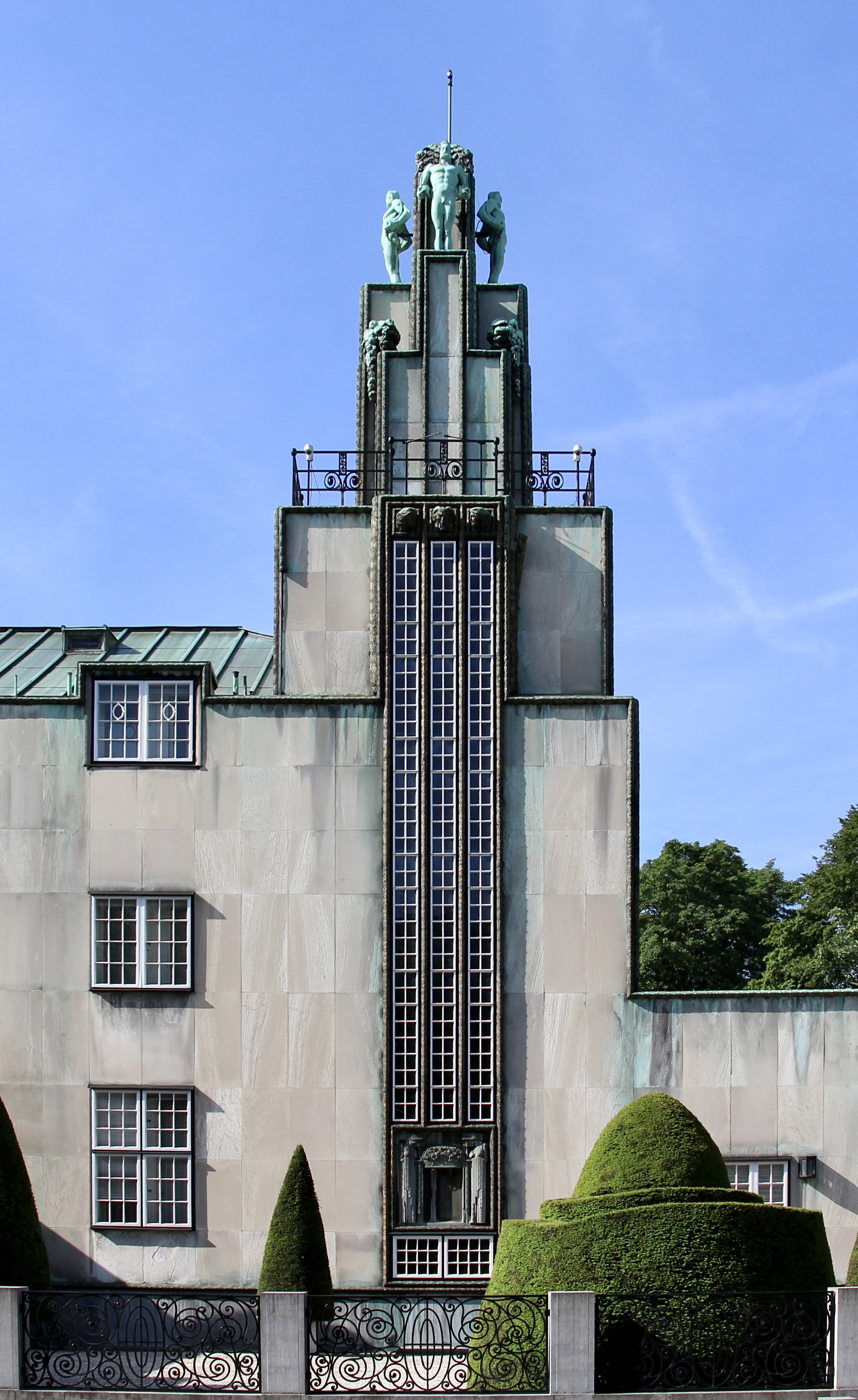
Secessionist façade of the Stoclet Palace in Brussels, by Josef Hoffmann (1905–1911)

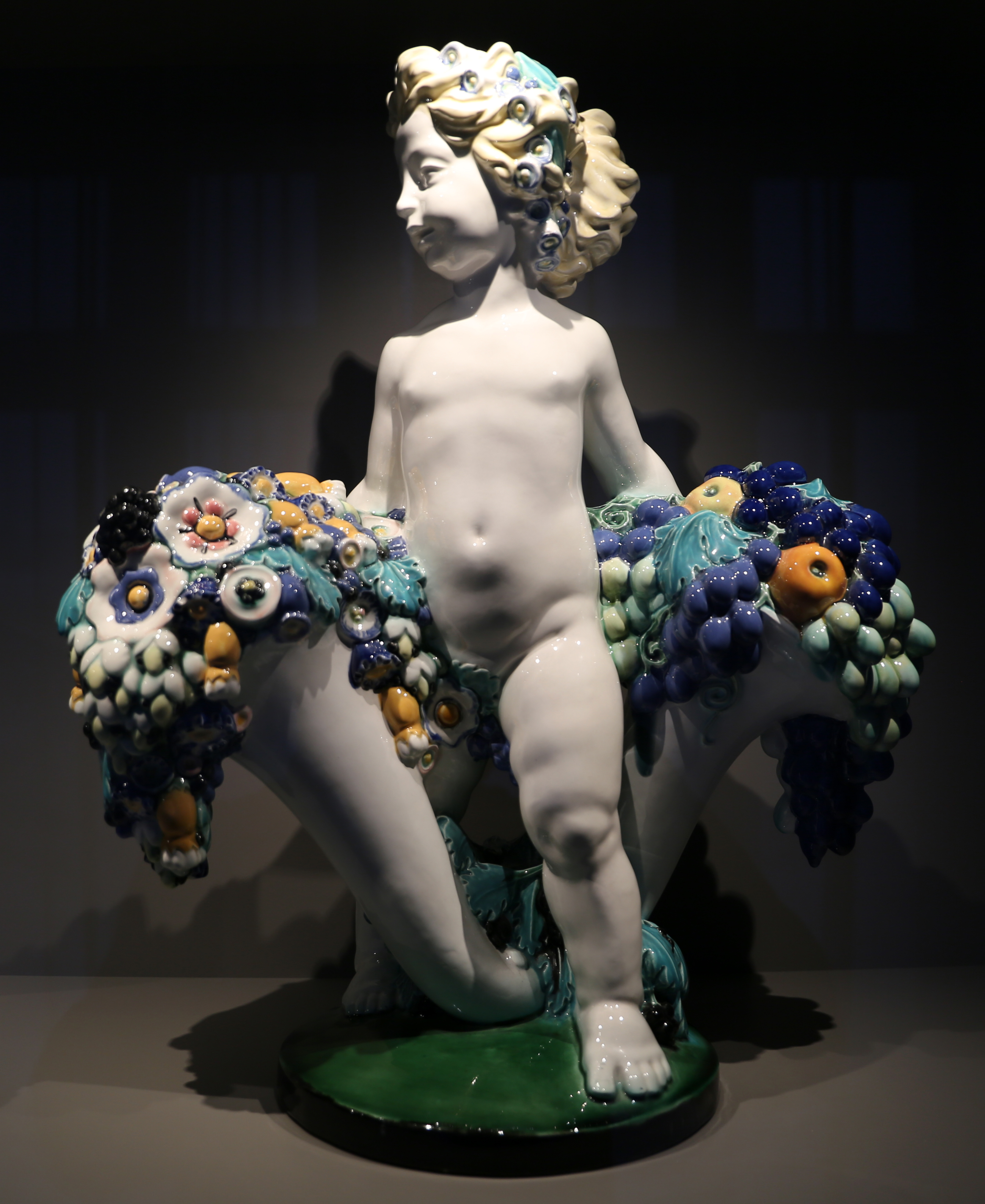
Secessionist putto with two cornucopias with floral cascades, very similar to the ones found in a lot of Art Deco of the 1910s and 1920s, by Michael Powolny, designed in c. 1907, produced in 1912, ceramic, Kunstgewerbemuseum Berlin

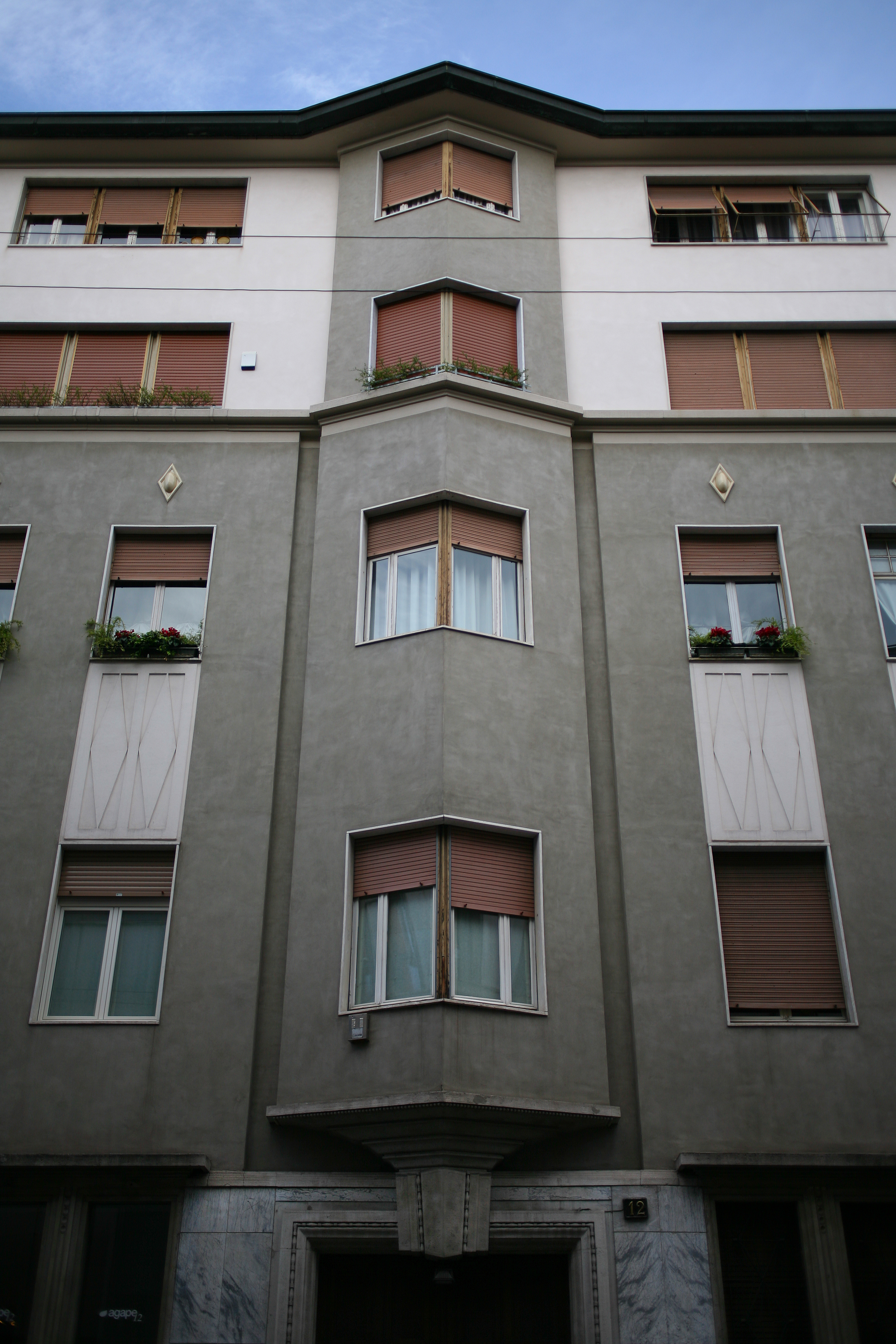
Via Statuto no. 12 (Art Deco) in Milan, Italy, by Giovanni Greppi (1919), similar to Charles Rennie Mackintosh's buildings

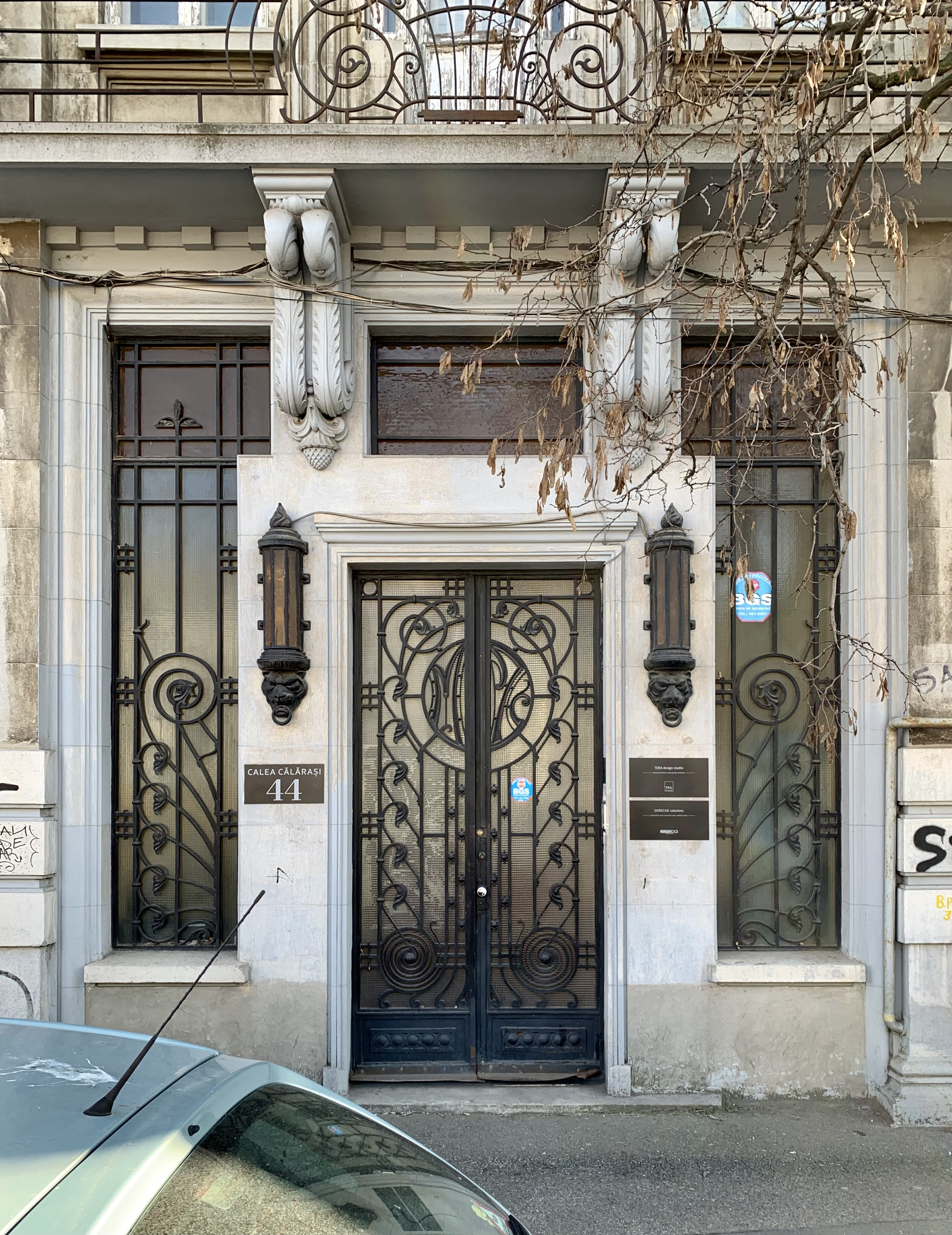
Art Deco door with spirals and sinuous lines, of the Mihai Zisman House (Calea Călărașilor no. 44) in Bucharest, by Soru (1920)

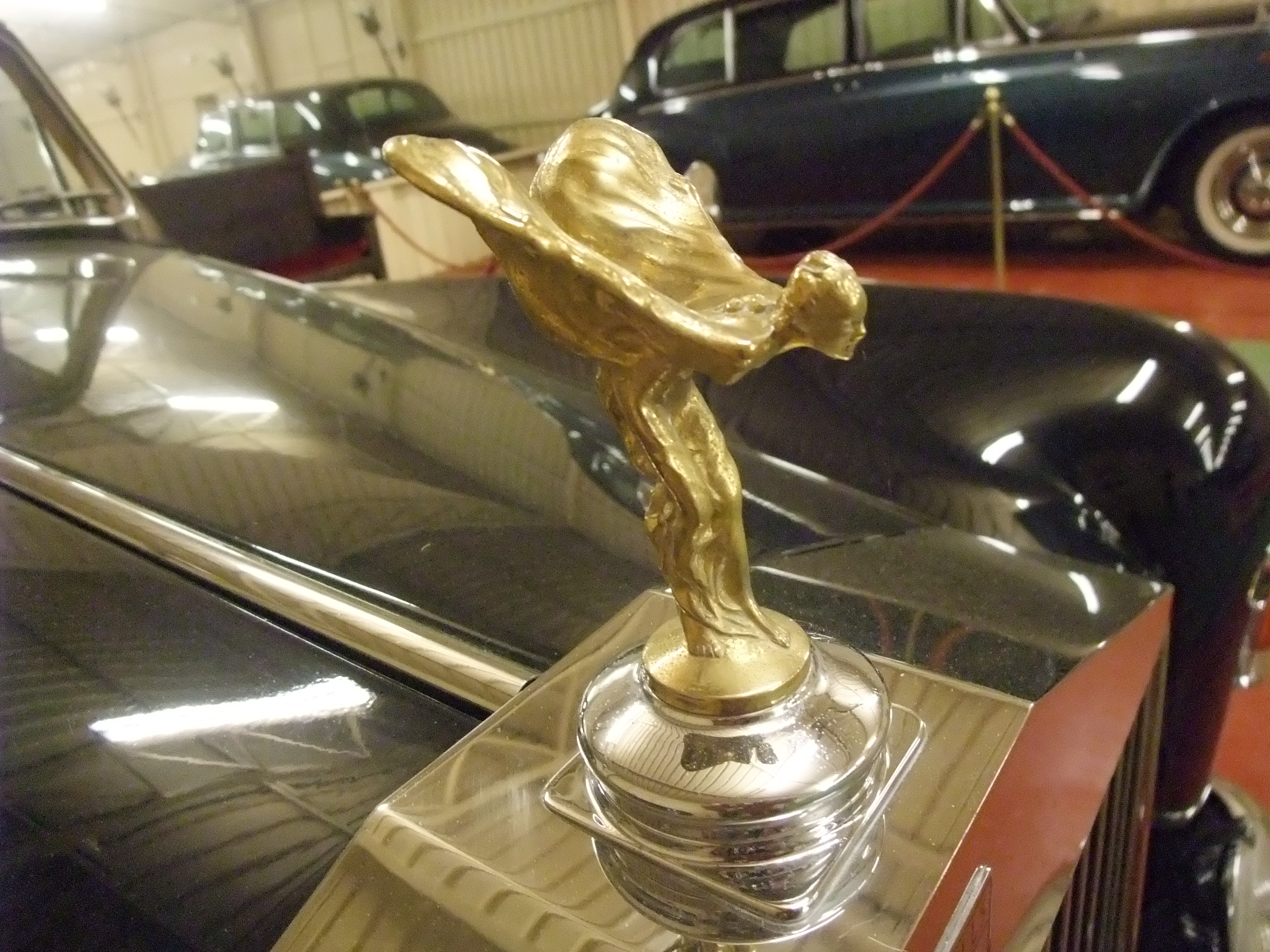
Art Deco Rolls Royce radiator figurine, similar to Art Nouveau ethereal figures of women in graceful wavy garments, designed by Charles Robinson Sykes (1920s), in the Antique and Classic Car Museum, Torre Loizaga, Galdames, Spain

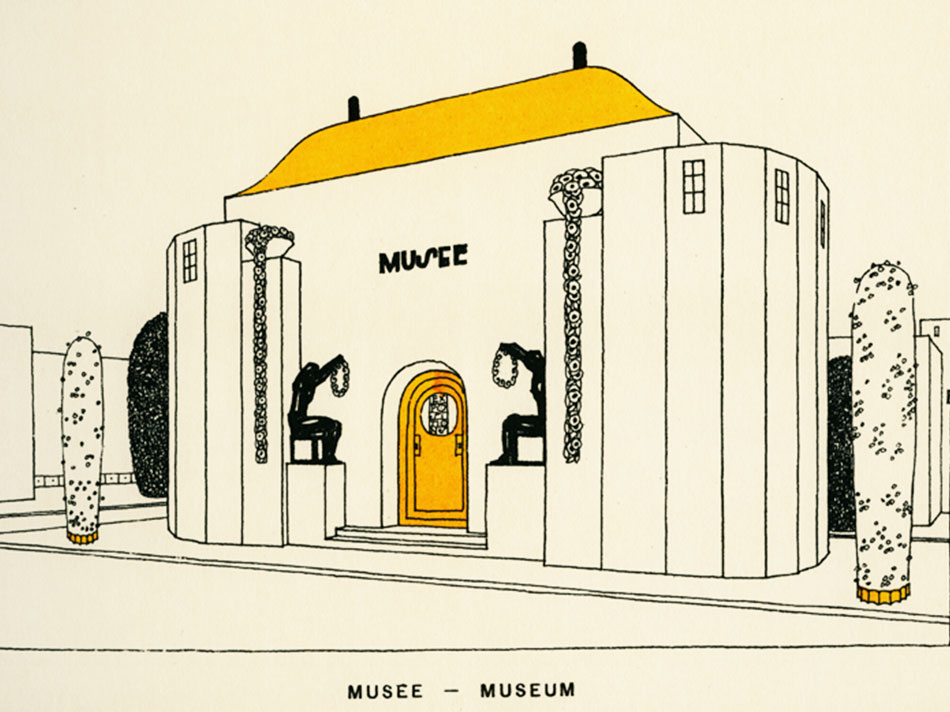
Art Deco museum design, similar to Josef Hoffmann's Secessionist buildings, part of a series of sketches known as Une cité moderne, by Robert Mallet-Stevens (1922)

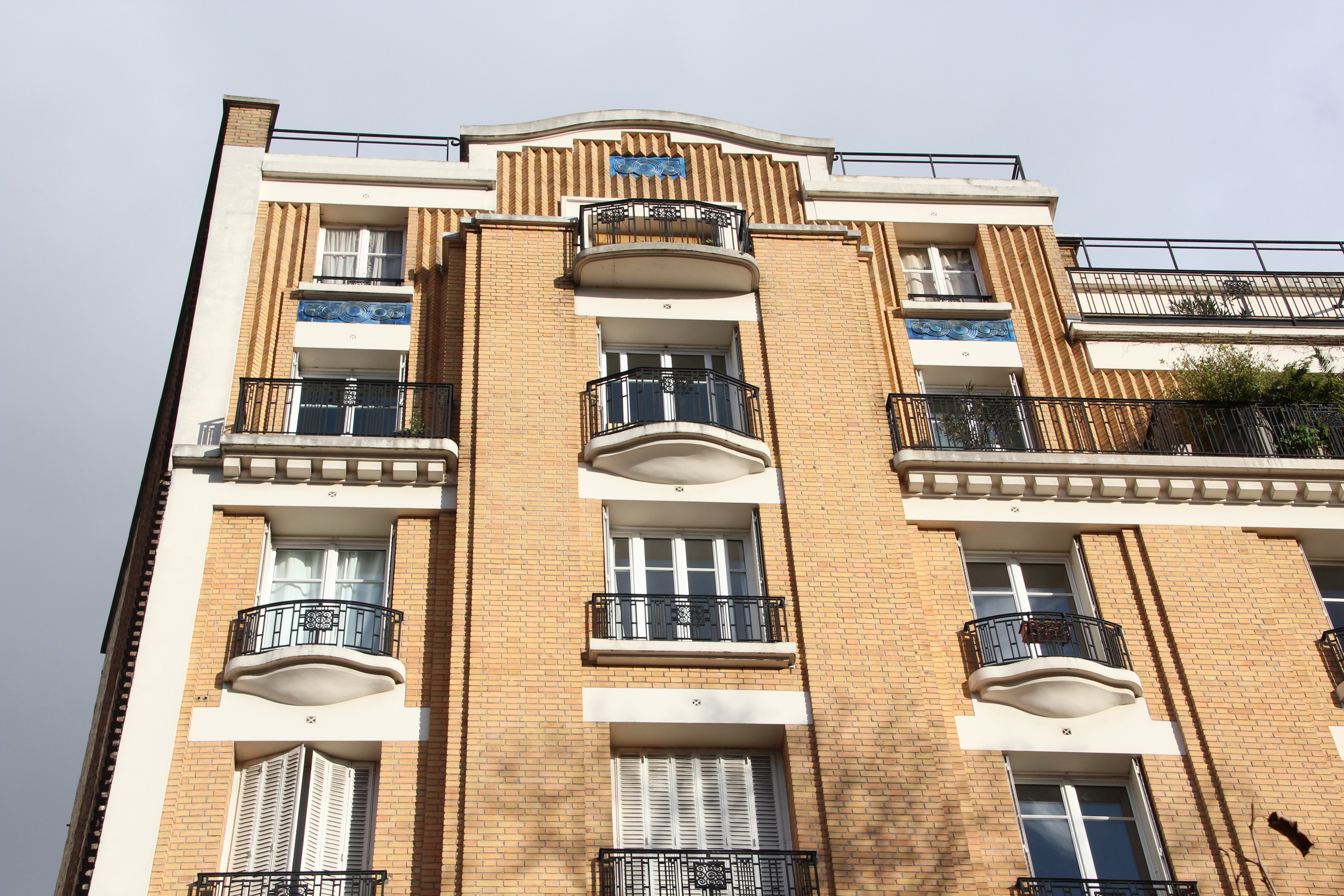
Art Deco balconies with sinuous bases of Avenue Richerand no. 1 in Paris, unknown architect (c. 1930)

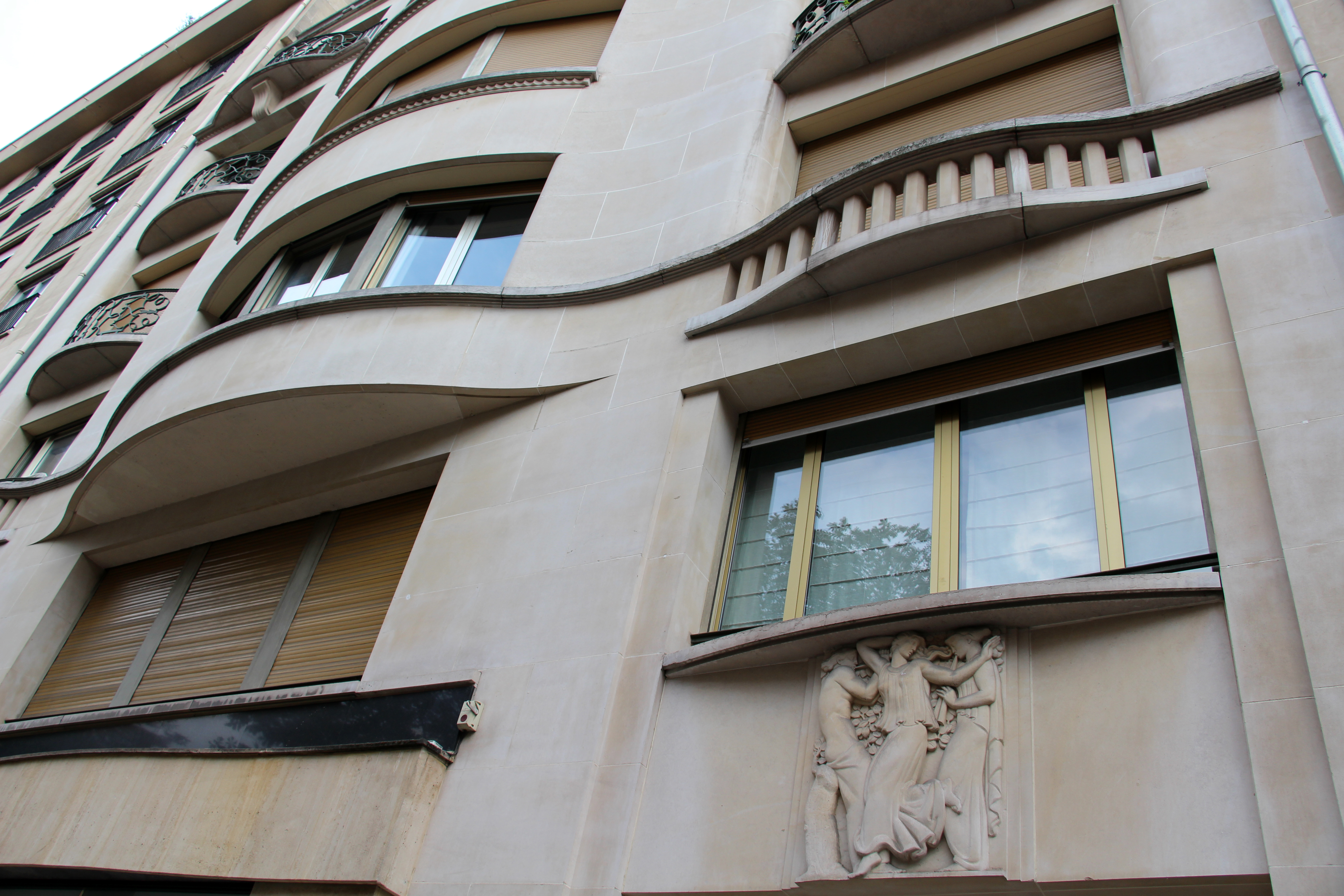
Sinuous curves on the façade of Avenue Montaigne no. 26 in Paris, by Louis Duhayon and Marcel Julien (1937)

Art Nouveau was one of the factors that led to Art Deco, a style created as a collective effort of multiple French designers to create a new modern style around 1910. This is because Art Nouveau broke the supremacy of 19th-century revivalism and eclecticism, opposing academic conventions. Through its various manifestations, it invented new ornamental systems, no longer dependent on historical formulae, through curvy plant forms in most of the world, geometric decoration in Austria-Hungary and the UK, and reinterpretations of national tradition in the countries of Northern, Central and Eastern Europe. The idea of creating a new style, with new ornaments and shapes, was a significant contribution that Art Nouveau brought to the invention of Art Deco. Another aspect taken from Art Nouveau is the emphasis put on domestic luxury.

Some of the fine details and sinuous lines of Art Nouveau are also found in Art Deco architecture and design of the 1920s, but slightly simplified. Similarly, the flat colours and visible outlines popularized by Art Nouveau posters are very often used in Art Deco illustration. Compared to many Art Nouveau designs, where the vegetal motifs seem to grow and morph on the object or architectural ornament, most Art Deco works have a clear compositional structure, similar to Neoclassicism.

Aside from ideas taken from Franco-Belgian Art Nouveau, influence came also from the geometric motifs and volumes found in the UK and Vienna. The flowers, spirals and squares found here are very similar to the ones found in Art Deco. Charles Rennie Mackintosh even anticipated Art Deco forms in his later creations. One of the Secessionist works that best anticipates the style is the Stoclet Palace in Brussels, with its ziggurat-shaped setbacks, the vertical slit of the staircase window, and the overall simplicity and modest ornamentation.

=== Revivals ===
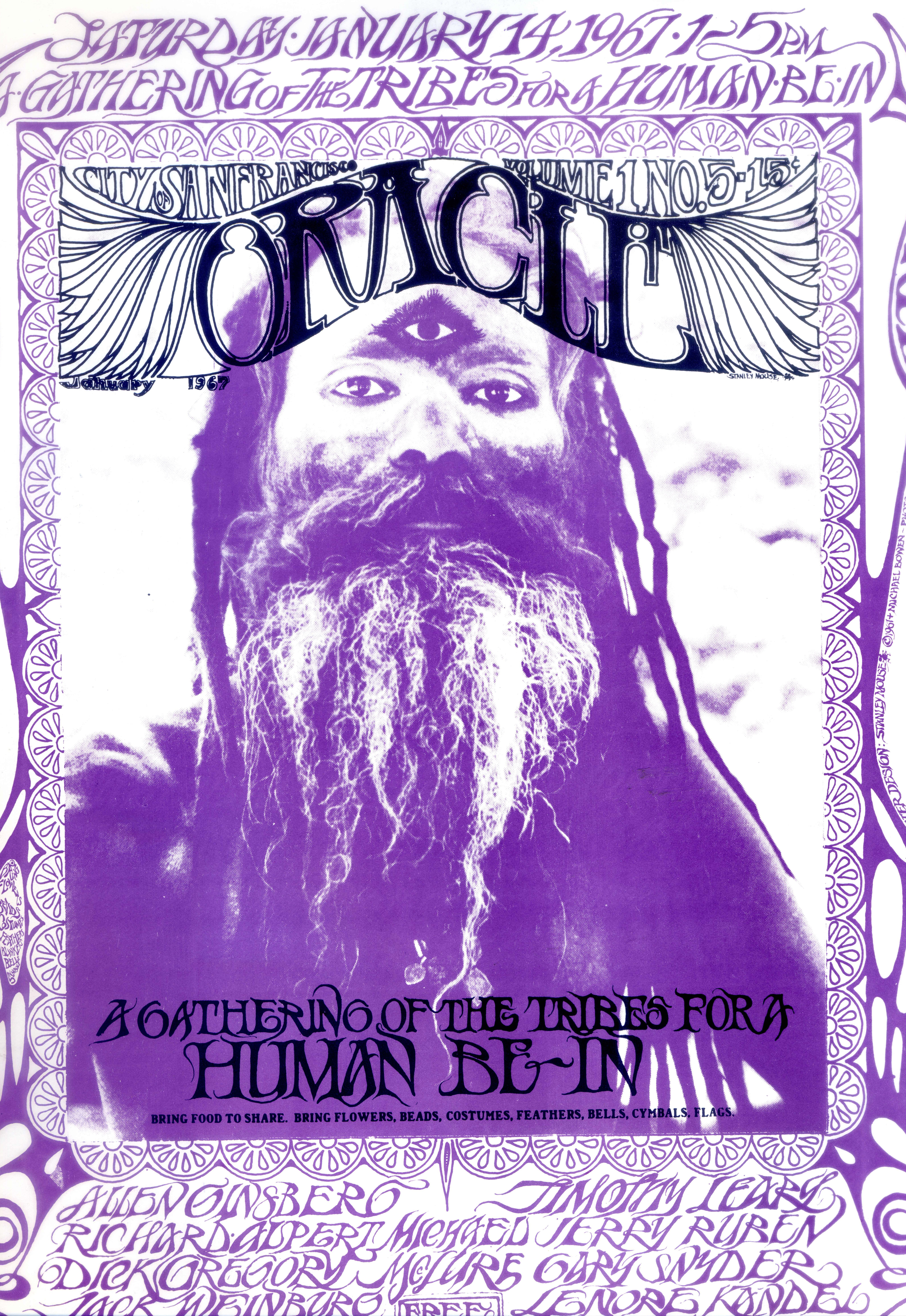
Cover of the San Francisco Oracle, vol. 1, no. 5, from facsimile edition, an example of a psychedelic rock poster, unknown author (1966 or 1967)

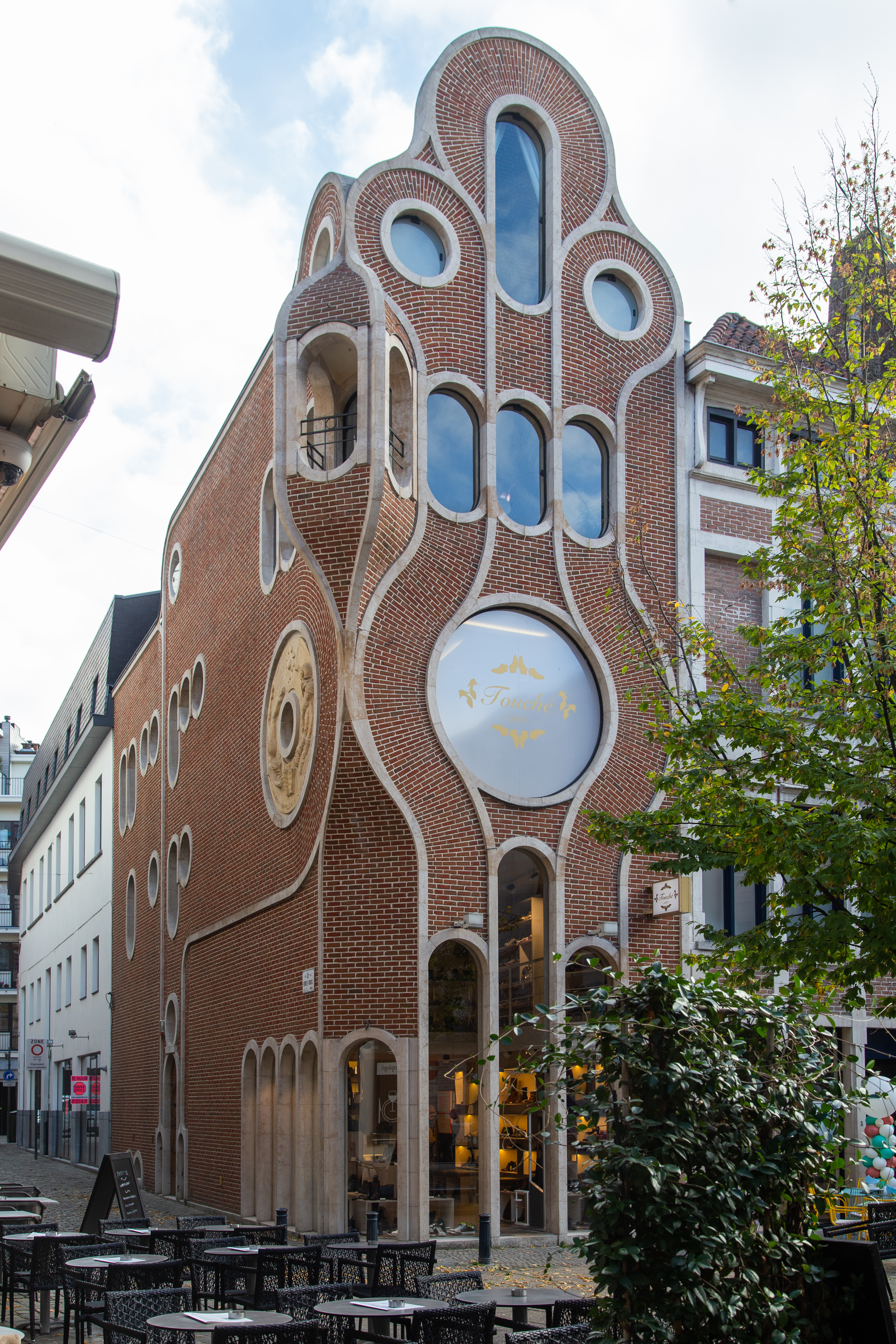
Kalandestraat no. 1 in Ghent, Belgium, by Denis Van Impe and Colette Van Vynckt (1980)

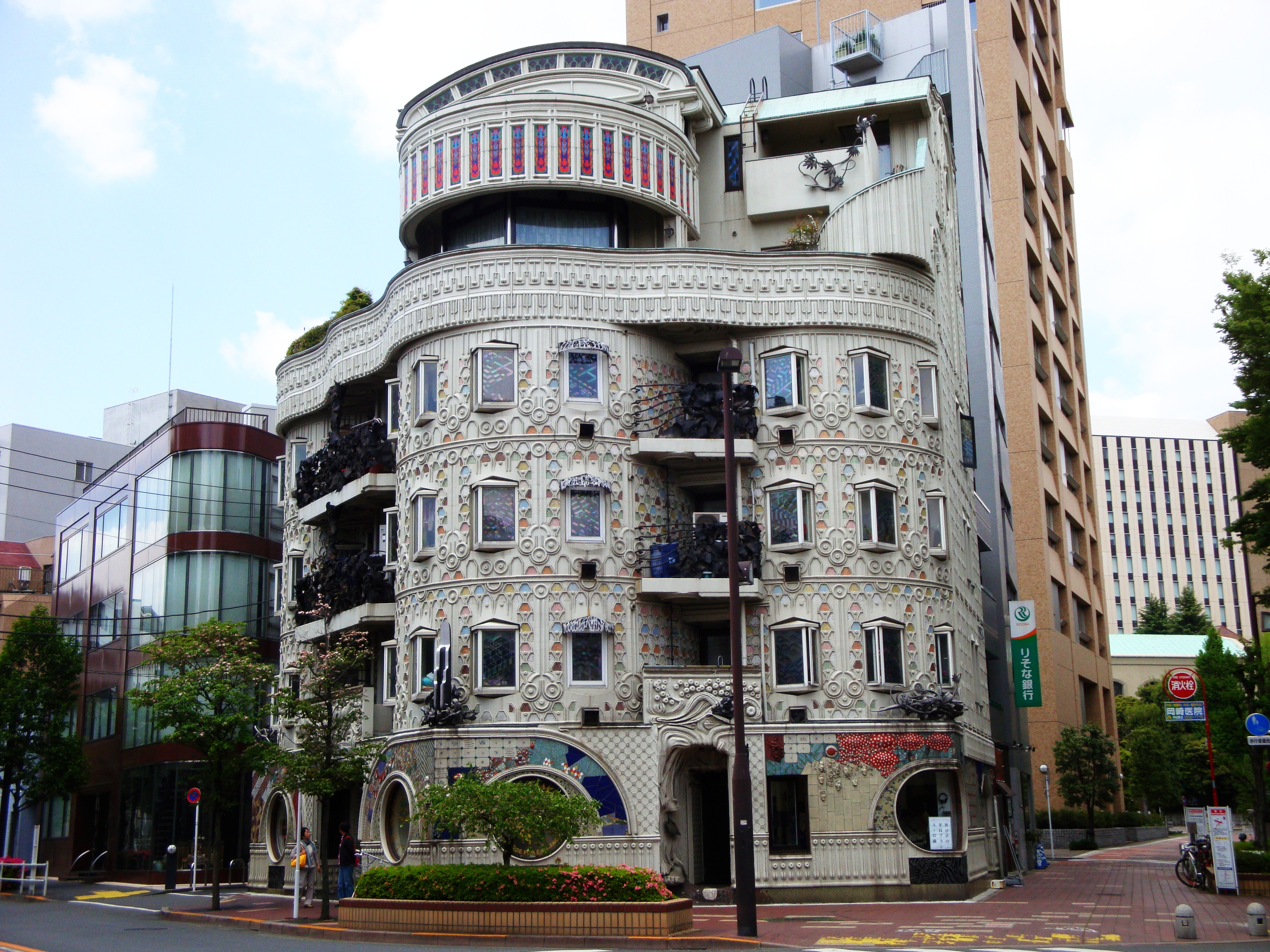
Waseda El Dorado in Tokyo by Von Jour Caux (1983)

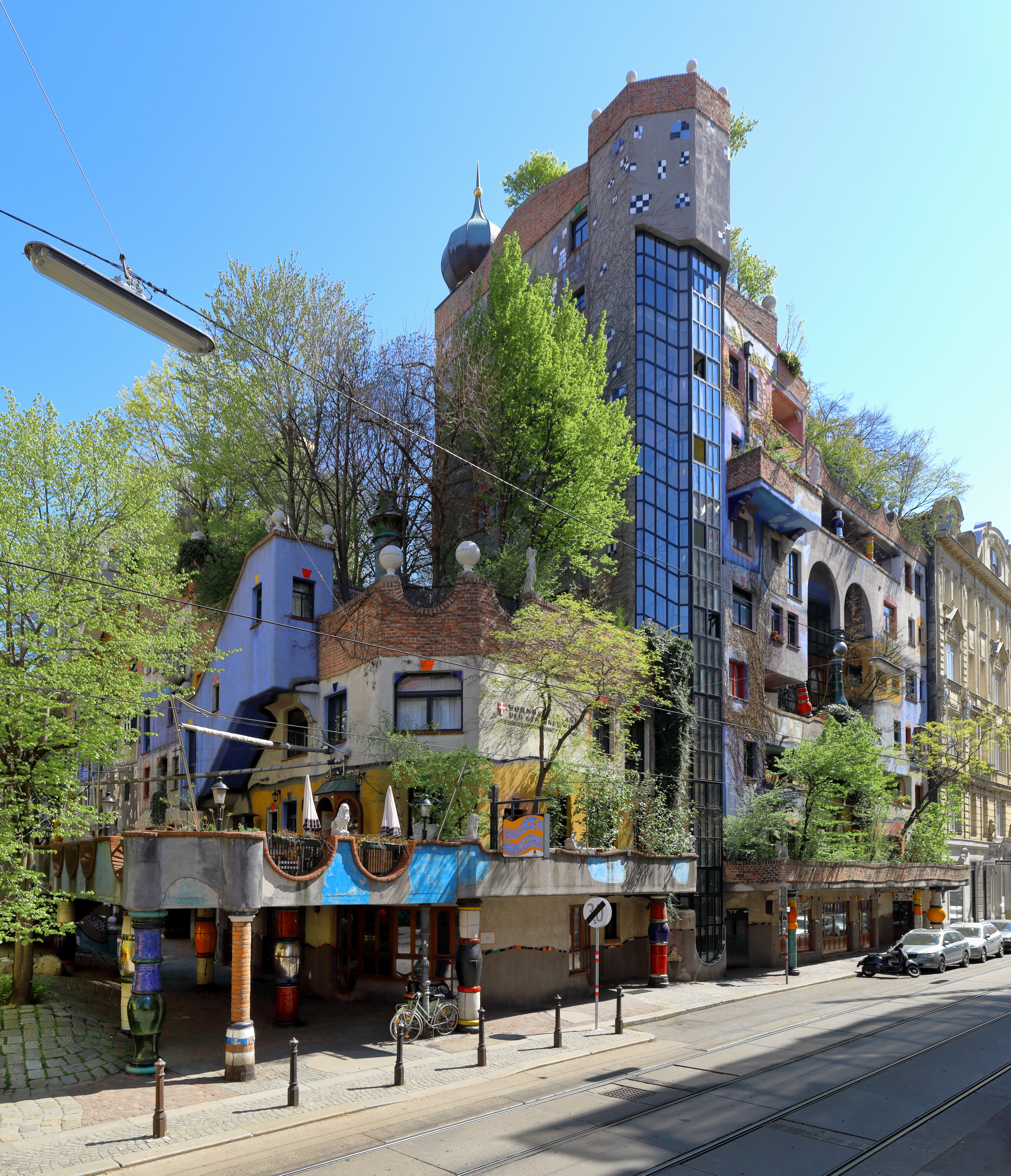
Hundertwasserhaus in Vienna by Friedensreich Hundertwasser (1983–1985)

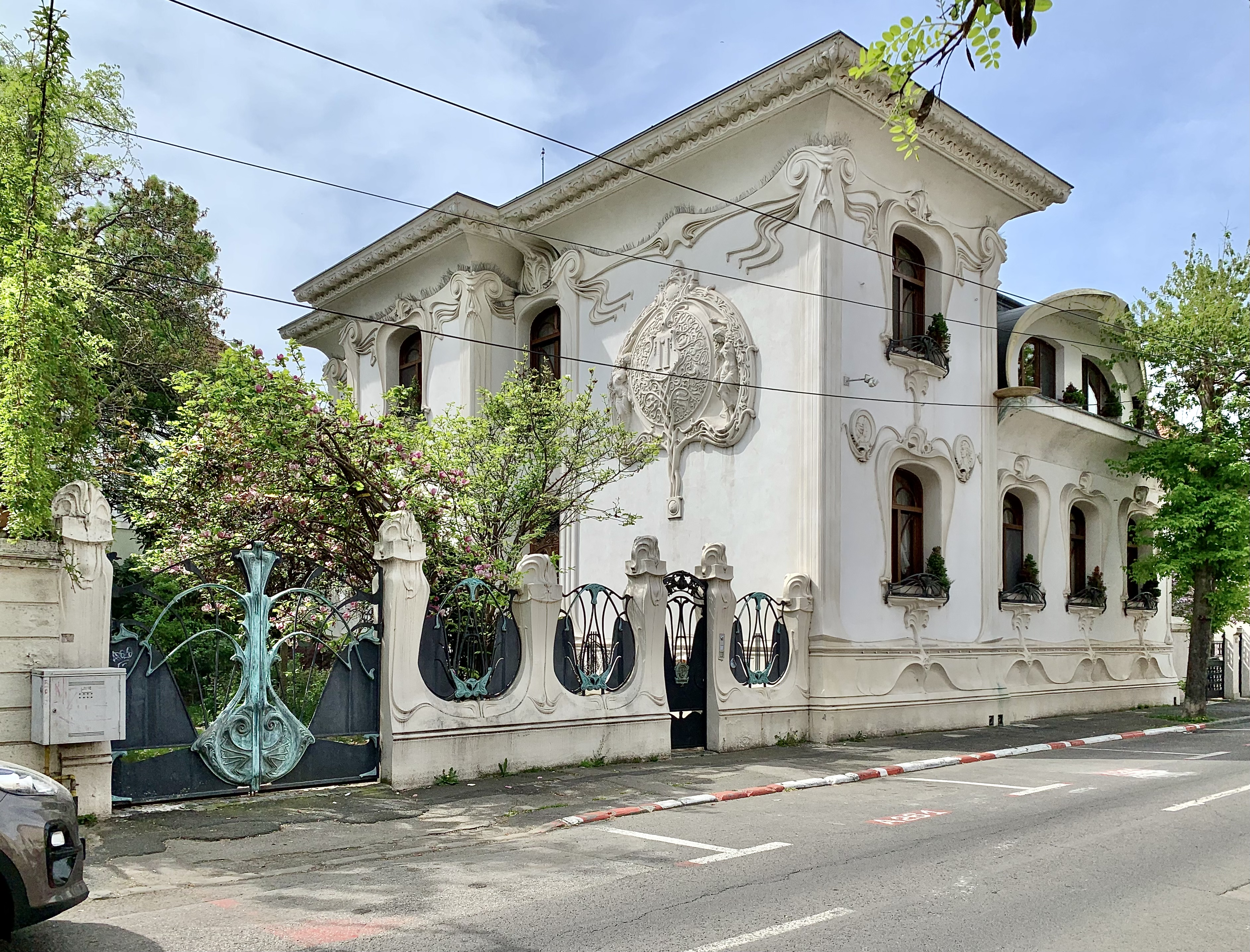
Strada Dimitrie Racoița in Bucharest, unknown architect (c. 2010)

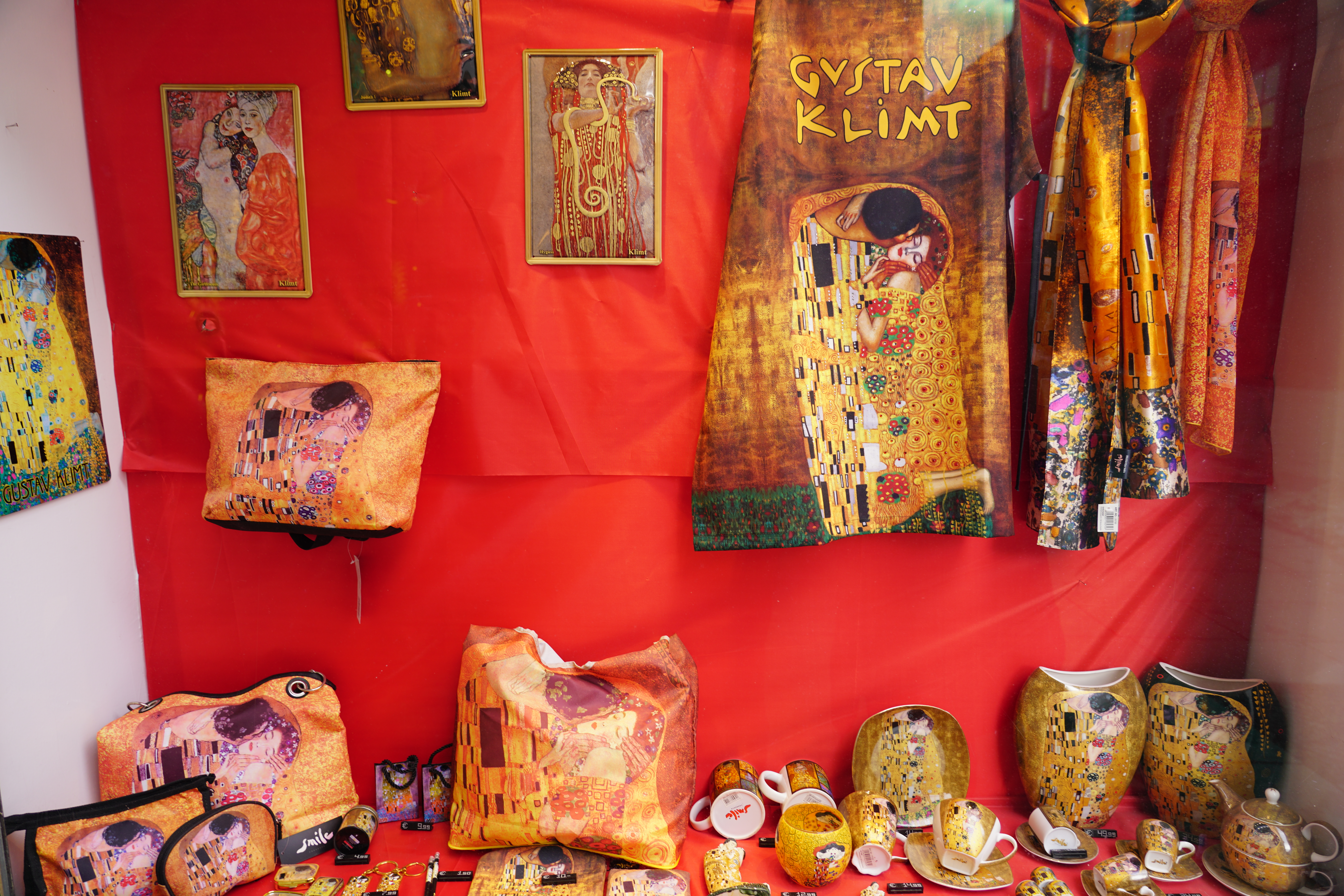
Gustav Klimt's The Kiss printed on various objects in the window of a shop in Salzburg, Austria (2019)

During the 1960s, postmodernism was born. This was and is a movement that questions modernism (the status quo after World War II), and promoted the inclusion and reinterpretation of elements of historic styles in new designs. Although several international exhibitions on Art Nouveau happened in the 1950s, a successful revival appeared in the 1960s, and especially in the 1970s with the rise of postmodernism. Aside from exhibitions, this revival might be connected with the "flower power" generation that set the tone at the time recognized its own life ideals in the floral ornament and the erotically "emancipated" art themes of the years around 1900.

Art Nouveau was also one of the main sources of inspiration for many posters of psychedelic rock from the same period. Leading proponents of the 1960s psychedelic art movement were San Francisco poster artists such as Rick Griffin, Victor Moscoso, Bonnie MacLean, Stanley Mouse, Alton Kelley, and Wes Wilson. Compared to the earthy colours that characterize Art Nouveau, these posters had highly saturated colours put in contrast, and also highly stylised text, sometimes hard to read. This style flourished from about 1966 to 1972.

Gustav Klimt's iconic paintings are found today on many kitschy souvenirs: mugs, plates, napkins, key chains, and so on. The Kiss has been printed on countless sizes and materials. In a similar situation are Alphonse Mucha's posters.

One of the artists who found in Art Nouveau a major source of inspiration was the Austrian painter and architect Friedensreich Hundertwasser. He took inspiration from multiple sources, including Egon Schiele, Baroque and Persian miniature, and the curvy ornamentation of Art Nouveau.

== See also ==
- Aestheticism
- Art Nouveau religious buildings
- Fin de siècle
- Paris architecture of the Belle Époque
- Réseau Art Nouveau Network
- Secession (art)
- Second Industrial Revolution
- Timeline of Art Nouveau
- World Art Nouveau Day
- Main Customs Office (Munich)

== Bibliography ==
- Bony, Anne, L'Architecture Moderne, Paris, Larousse (2012) ISBN 978-2-03-587641-6
- Bouillon, Jean-Paul (1985). Journal de l'Art Nouveau. Paris: Skira. ISBN 2605000699.
- Celac, Mariana; Carabela, Octavian; Marcu-Lapadat, Marius (2017). Bucharest Architecture - an annotated guide. Order of Architects of Romania. ISBN 9789730238846.
- Culot, Maurice; Pirlot, Ann-Marie (2005). Bruxelles Art Nouveau (in French). Brussels: Archives d'Architecture Moderne. ISBN 2-87143-126-4.
- Duncan, Alastair, Art Nouveau, World of Art, New York: Thames and Hudson, 1994. ISBN 0500202737
- Fahr-Becker, Gabriele (2015). L'Art Nouveau (in French). H.F. Ullmann. ISBN 9783848008575.
- Heller, Steven, and Seymour Chwast, Graphic Style from Victorian to Digital, new ed. New York: Harry N. Abrams, Inc., 2001. pp. 53–57.
- Huyges, René, L'Art et le monde moderne, Volume 1, Librarie Larousse, Paris, 1970
- Journel, Guillemette Morel (2015). Le Corbusier- Construire la Vie Moderne (in French). Editions du Patrimoine: Centre des Monument Nationaux. ISBN 978-2-7577-0419-6.
- Lahor, Jean (2007) [1901]. L'Art nouveau (in French). Baseline Co. Ltd. ISBN 9781859956670.
- Ormiston, Rosalind; Robinson, Michael (2013). Art Nouveau – Posters, Illustration and Fine Art. Flame Tree Publishing. ISBN 9781847862808.
- Plum, Gilles (2014). Paris architectures de la Belle Époque (in French). Éditions Parigramme. ISBN 9782840968009.
- Renault, Christophe and Lazé, Christophe, Les Styles de l'architecture et du mobliier, Éditions Jean-Paul Gisserot, 2006 (in French). ISBN 9782877474658
- Riley, Noël (2004). Grammaire des Arts Décoratifs (in French). Flammarion.
- Sarnitz, August (2018). Otto Wagner (in French). Cologne: Taschen. ISBN 9783836564328.
- Sato, Tamako (2015). Alphonse Mucha: The Artist as Visionary. Cologne: Taschen. ISBN 9783836550093.
- Selz, Peter; Constantine, Mildred (1959). Art Nouveau - Art and Design at the Turn of the Century (PDF). New York: The Museum of Modern Art. ISBN 9780870702228.
- Sembach, Klaus-Jürgen (2013). L'Art Nouveau: L'Utopie de la Réconciliation (in French). Taschen. ISBN 9783822830055.
- Sterner, Gabriele, Art Nouveau, an Art of Transition: From Individualism to Mass Society, 1st English ed. (original title: Jugendstil: Kunstformen zwischen Individualismus und Massengesellschaft), translated by Frederick G. Peters and Diana S. Peters, publisher Woodbury, N.Y.: Barron's Educational Series, 1982. ISBN 0812021053
- Texier, Simon (2012). Paris: Panorama de l'architecture. Parigramme. ISBN 9782840966678.
- Thiébaut, Philippe (2018). Mucha et l'Art Nouveau (in French). Paris: Éditions du Chêne. ISBN 9782812318061.
- Vigne, George (2016). Hector Guimard: Le geste magnifique de l'Art Nouveau (in French). Paris: Editions du Patrimoine - Centre des monuments nationaux. ISBN 9782757704943.
