= Doctor's House =

Doctor's House or Doctor House may refer to:

- Doctor's House, Skælskør, a historic building in Skælskør, Denmark
- Doctors House, a historic, NRHP-listed building in Glendale, California, United States
- Fabianinkatu 17, a historic building in Helsinki, Finland formerly known as the Doctors' House

== See also ==
- Doctor in the House (disambiguation)
- House doctor (disambiguation)
