= Pipsan Saarinen Swanson =

Finnish-American designer (1905–1979)

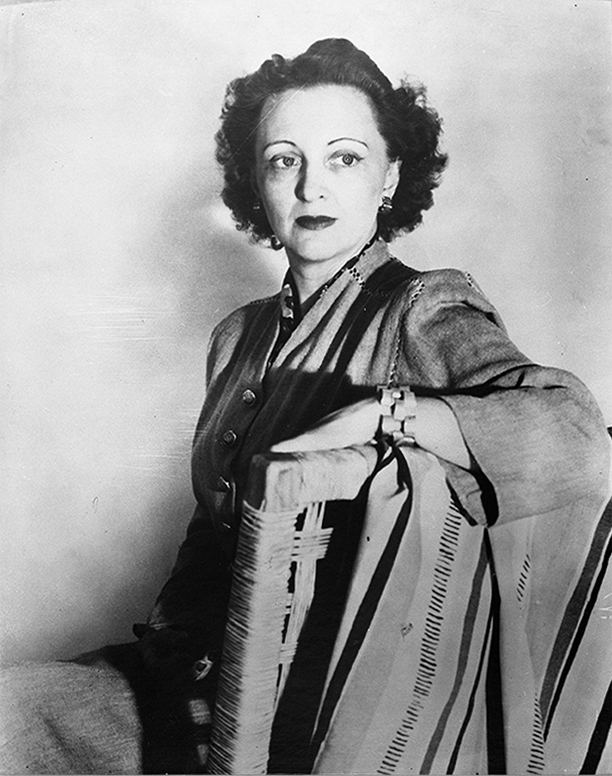
- Swanson in 1948
- Born: Eva-Lisa Saarinen Swanson; March 31, 1905; Kirkkonummi, Grand Duchy of Finland, Russian Empire
- Died: October 23, 1979 (aged 74); Bloomfield Township, Michigan
- Education: University of Helsinki
- Occupations: Industrial, interior, and textile designer
- Spouse: Robert Swanson (m. 1926)
- Parent(s): Eliel Saarinen; Loja Gesellius
- Relatives: Eero Saarinen (brother)

Eva-Lisa "Pipsan" Saarinen Swanson (March 31, 1905 – October 23, 1979) was a Finnish-American industrial, interior, and textile designer based in Michigan. She was known for her contemporary furniture, textile, and product designs.

== Early life and education ==
Swanson was born in Kirkkonummi, Finland to architect Eliel Saarinen and noted textile designer and sculptor Loja Saarinen. She was the elder sister of celebrated architect Eero Saarinen. She studied weaving, ceramics, and fabric design at Atheneum Art School and University of Helsinki. She moved to the United States with her family in 1923. They eventually settled in Bloomfield Hills when her father became the resident architect at The Cranbrook Academy of Art.

She married architect J. Robert (Bob) F. Swanson in 1926.

== Work ==
Swanson was part of a strong period of educators and students at Cranbrook known as the "golden moment". She taught the first class on contemporary furniture design at Cranbrook. In 1935, both she and her mother had their textiles exhibited at the Metropolitan Museum of Art. Swanson left the academy to work with her husband. They formed Swanson Associates in 1947. It was the first architectural firm that also included interior design services. Swanson was typically responsible for the interior design. Among the projects on which they worked was The Koebel House, located in Grosse Pointe, Michigan.

One of her most noted products was a line of indoor outdoor furniture known as the Sol-Air Group, produced by Ficks Reed. She created various other furnishings and decorative items including lamps, glassware, fabrics, and pottery with Swanson and her brothers. Swanson was also an industrial design consultant for clients including Barwick Mills, Goodall Fabrics, and the Pittsburgh Plate Glass Company.

She was named an honorary member of the American Institute of Architects in 1972.

== Death ==
Swanson died at her home in Bloomfield Township, Michigan in 1979 following a short illness.
