= Herman Gesellius =

Finnish architect (1874-1916)

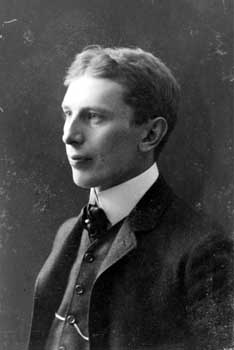
- Gesellius in 1890
- Born: Herman Ernst Henrik Gesellius; 16 January 1874; Helsinki, Grand Duchy of Finland
- Died: 24 March 1916 (aged 42); Kirkkonummi, Grand Duchy of Finland
- Education: Polytechnical Institute
- Occupation: Architect
- Relatives: Loja Gesellius (sister); Eliel Saarinen (brother-in-law)

Herman Ernst Henrik Gesellius (16 January 1874 – 24 March 1916) was a Finnish architect.

== Biography ==
Gesellius graduated from the Polytechnical Institute in 1897. In 1896 he founded the architecture firm Gesellius, Lindgren, Saarinen with Armas Lindgren and Eliel Saarinen. His younger sister was the sculptor Loja Gesellius, who later married Saarinen.

The most famous work projected under his own name is the Wuorio House ("Wuorion talo") at Unioninkatu 30, Helsinki. Gesellius designed it from 1908 to 1909, and Lindgren completed it from 1913 to 1914. It also features sculptures by Felix Nylund.

Gesellius withdrew from architectural work in 1912 because of a serious illness. He died in 1916 from a tuberculotic disease.

== Works with Lindgren and Saarinen ==
- Thalberg House in Helsinki (1897–1898)
- Finnish Pavilion at Exposition Universelle in 1900, Paris
- Pohjola Insurance building in Helsinki (1900–1901)
- House of Physicians, now Agronomitalo, in Helsinki (1900–1901)
- Hvitträsk, home-atelier of architects in Kirkkonummi (1901–1904)
- National Museum of Finland in Helsinki (1905–1910)
- Club house for the Luther factory in Tallinn (1904–1905)
- Vyborg railway station (1904–1913), with Saarinen

== Gallery ==
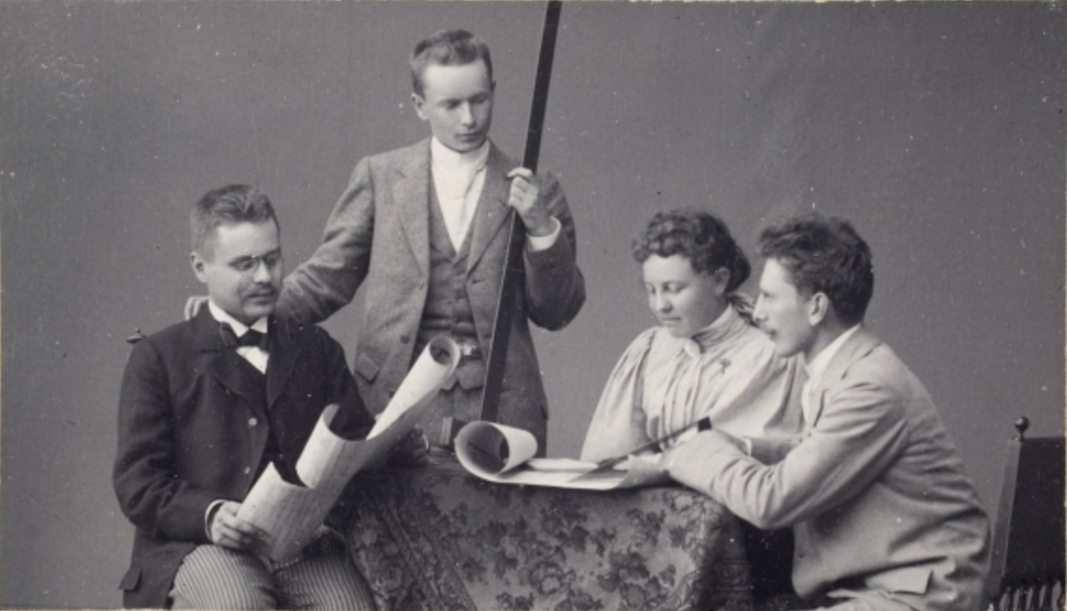
Armas Lindgren, Eliel Saarinen and Herman Gesellius in the late 1890s (with Albertina Östman)

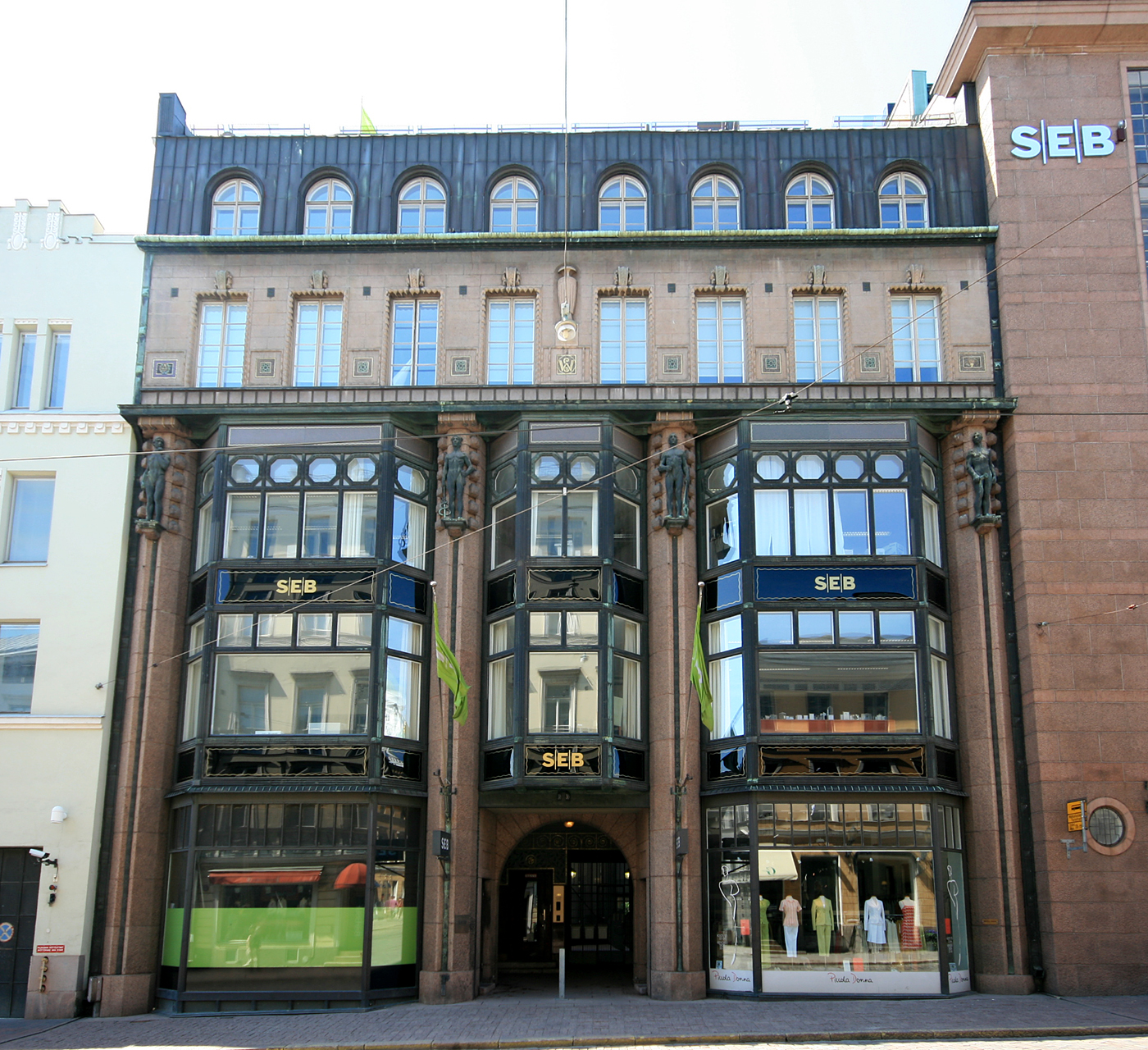
Wuorio House at Unioninkatu 30
