= Charles J. and Ingrid V. (Frendberg) Koebel House =

Historic house in Michigan, United States

- U.S. National Register of Historic Places
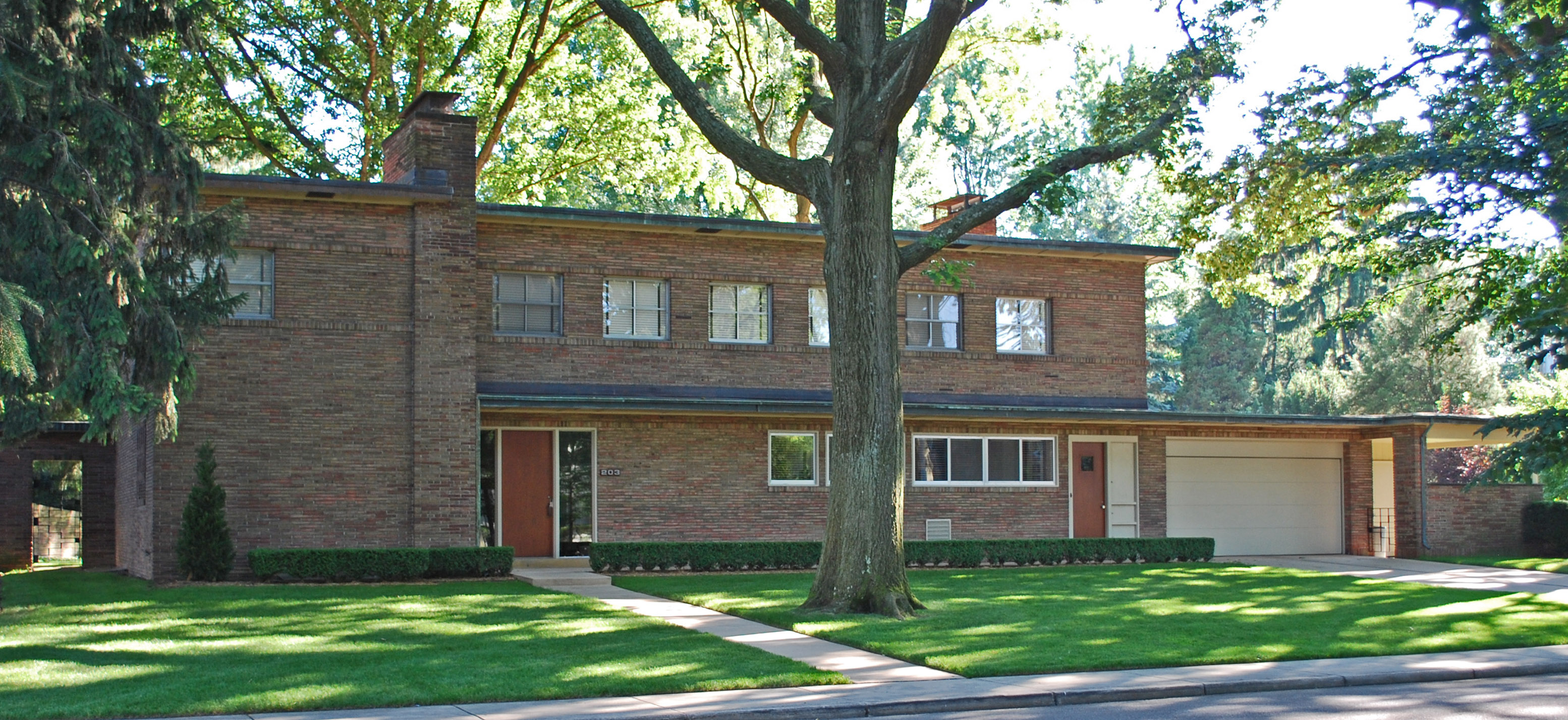

- Location within Michigan Location within the United States
- Interactive map
- Location: 203 Cloverly Rd., Grosse Pointe Farms
- Coordinates: 42°24′17″N 82°53′57″W
- Built: 1939
- Architect: Eliel Saarinen and Eero Saarinen, J. Robert F. Swanson
- Architectural style: Modernist
- NRHP reference No.: 09001068
- Added to NRHP: February 10, 2000

The Charles J. and Ingrid V. (Frendberg) Koebel House is a private house located at 203 Cloverly Road in Grosse Pointe Farms. It was listed on the National Register of Historic Places in 2009.

== History ==
Industrialist Charles J. Koebel was the owner of the Koebel Diamond Tool Company. Charles and his wife Ingrid met Eliel Saarinen on a boat to Finland, and in 1937, they hired the architectural firm of Eliel and his son Eero Saarinen to design their Grosse Pointe Farms house. It was the first commission for the father-and-son Saarinen firm. The interior of the house was designed by Pipsan Saarinen Swanson, Eliel's daughter, and the final plans for the house were prepared by J. Robert F. Swanson, Pipsan's husband, in 1939. Construction on the house was completed in 1940.

James A. Kelly and Mariam C. Noland purchased the house from the Koebel family in 1985 and restored it to original condition.

== Description ==
The Koebel House is a two-story, 5600 square-foot Modernist structure built from tan brick, with five bedrooms and a flat roof located on a corner lot. The house is essentially rectangular in plan, with the addition of a curved, projecting sun porch on the southwest corner.

On the interior, The first-floor living room, dining room, and music room are all one space, enclosed with a curving interior wall with sculpture niches. The space is subdivided with sets of windows, while built-in seating at one end and a recessed ceiling at the other create individual spaces. The second floor housed five bedrooms and four bathrooms. An advanced electrical and sound system was built into the walls, and could be controlled from the master bedroom.

The house, with its strong external horizontal lines, is designed to be part of the landscape. The design of the house features the repeated use of circles inscribed in rectangles, and integrates the exterior architecture, sculpture, interior design, lighting, and furnishings, and represents the best of Modernist design.
