= Vyborg railway station (1913) =

Coordinates: 60°42′55.33″N 28°45′5.01″E

Vyborg Вы́борг
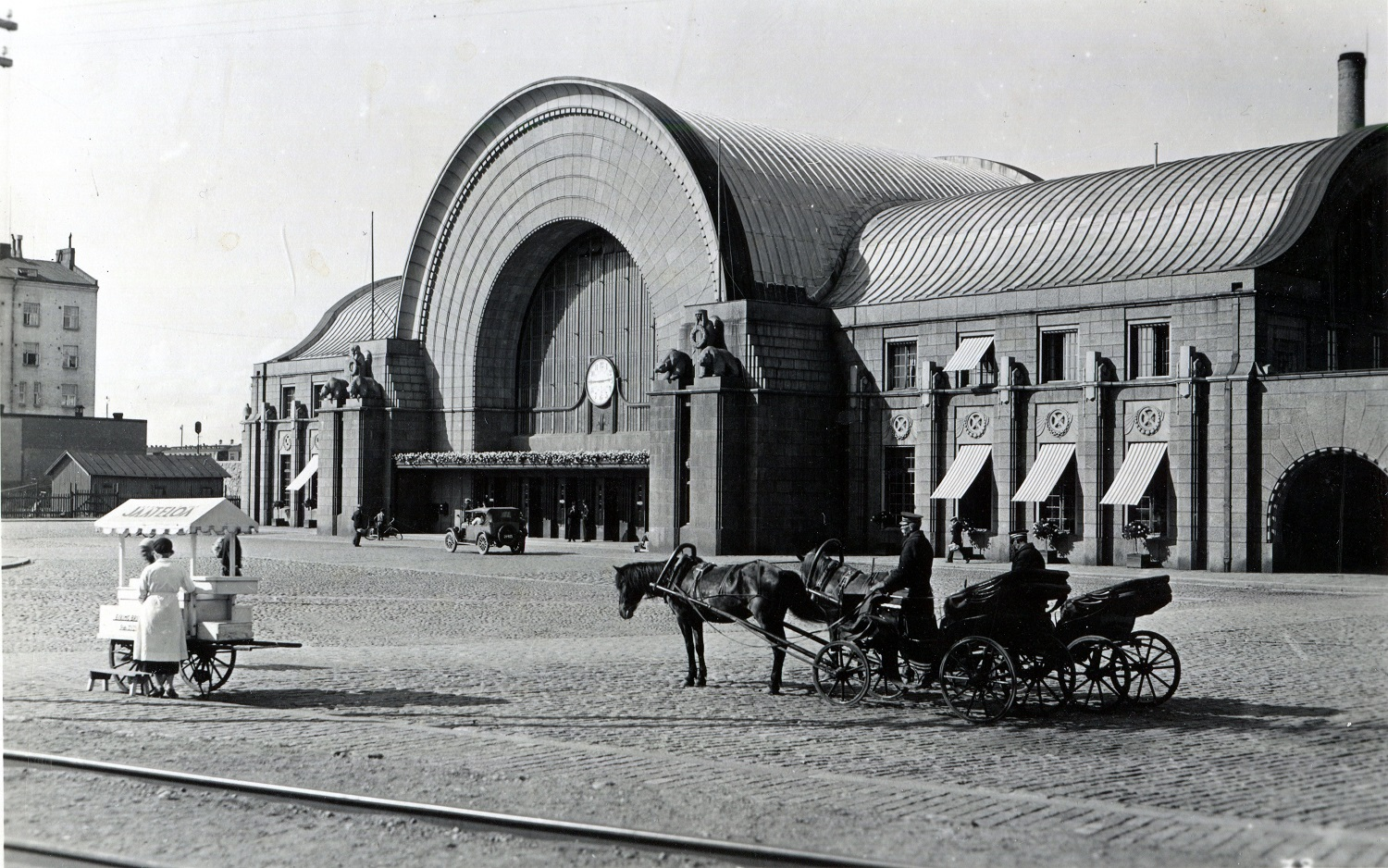
- The Vyborg railway station in the 1920s

General information
- Other names: Viipuri
- Location: Repola district, Vyborg; Leningrad Oblast; Russia
- Lines: Riihimäki–Saint Petersburg railway; Vyborg–Joensuu railroad; Liimatta–Valkjärvi railroad; Uuras railroad

Construction
- Architect: Herman Gesellius
- Architectural style: Romantic nationalism

Other information
- Status: Destroyed

History
- Opened: 10 July 1913
- Closed: August 1941
- Original company: Finnish State Railways (now VR Group)
Location

The Vyborg (Viipuri) railway station built in 1913 was the second railway station built in Vyborg, Grand Duchy of Finland (presently located in Leningrad Oblast, Russia). The station, which had replaced Vyborg's first railway station was almost completely destroyed in 1941 during the Continuation War, and only the part that had acted as a cargo office remains. The present Vyborg railway station was built in 1953.

The romantic nationalist building designed by Herman Gesellius was located on the northern end of the station square in the Repola district. It bore a close resemblance to the Helsinki Central railway station, finished six years later, which was designed by Eliel Saarinen who worked in the same architectural bureau as Gesellius. For example, both buildings had a similar high curved part above the main entrance, and similarly to the Helsinki station, the Vyborg station also had granite sculptures on pilasters on its facade. The Vyborg station was technically very modern; for example, it had machine-working air conditioning.

== History ==
The first station building in Vyborg was built in 1870 together with the Riihimäki–Saint Petersburg railway. As traffic increased, the city decided at the turn of the century to build a new, modern railway station. The architectural competition held in 1901 was won by the entry from Eliel Saarinen's and Herman Gesellius's architectural bureau. The final design was made by Gesellius, who started making the actual drawings in 1906. Construction was started in 1910 and the station was taken into use on 10 July 1913.

The new station consisted of three parts, which were the administrative building, the station proper, and the cargo office. The station hall with its waiting space and restaurant was placed in the middle of the tracks, accessed through three tunnels. The ticket office was next to the administrative building. Above the main entrance to the administrative building was a 20-meter tall curved part, which had a large window and clock in the middle of it. On both sides of the main doors made of oak were four statues of bears designed by Eva Gyldén and two statues of women. Two tunnels led from the administrative building to the waiting hall between the main tracks. The platform could also be accessed through a third tunnel between the administrative building and the cargo office. The restaurant and café were located in the middle of the administrative building and the waiting spaces in its ends. The western end was reserved for first and second-class passengers and the eastern end for third-class passengers.

In terms of passenger traffic, the Vyborg station was the second busiest railway station in Finland after the Helsinki Central station and in terms of cargo traffic, the Vyborg railway yard was the largest in Finland. There were five railways leading from the city in different directions. The Vyborg–Joensuu railroad, also known as the Karelian railroad, led north, going to Joensuu via Sortavala, the Liimatta–Valkjärvi railroad led east and the Uuras railroad led south towards Koivisto. Also a railroad to Saint Petersburg via Rajajoki led through the city.

The Vyborg railway station was almost completely destroyed in August 1941, when Soviet troops withdrew from the city and exploded the station buildings. Only one end wall of the waiting spaces and the cargo office, which remains in use to this day, remained. The tunnels leading to the platforms also remain, and they were put into use during the construction of the present station building in the early 1950s.

== Gallery ==
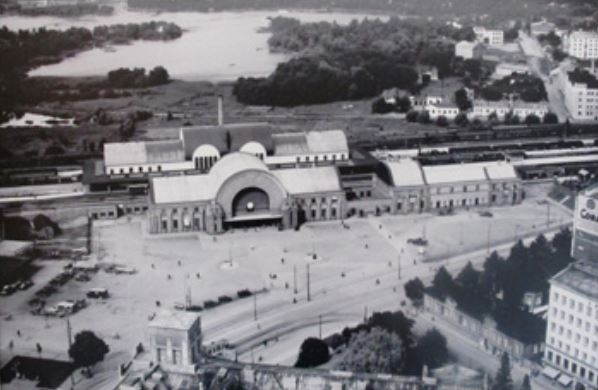
The station hall (background), the administrative building (foreground left) and the cargo office (right).

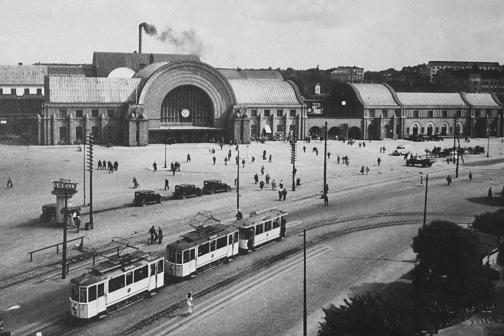
The station square and a tram in the 1930s.

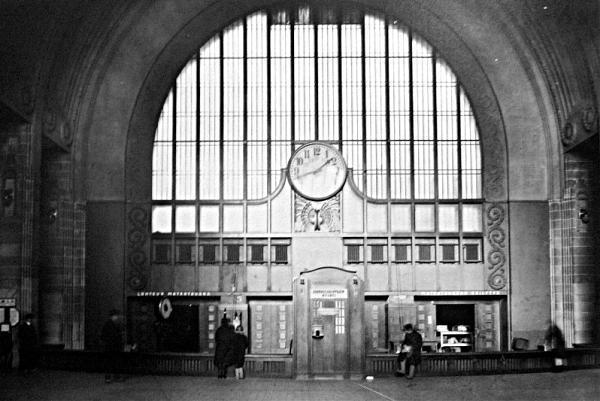
The administrative building and the ticket office.

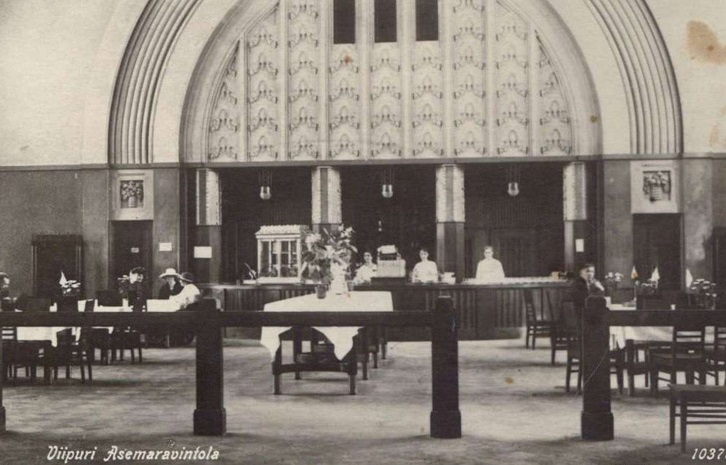
The station restaurant.

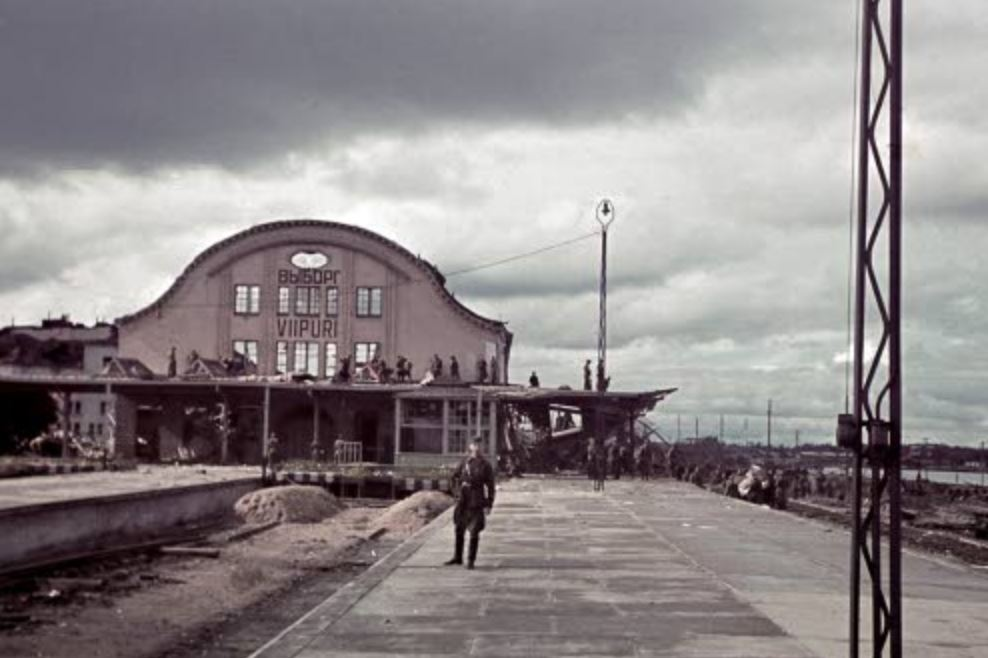
The waiting hall of the station in ruins in 1941.

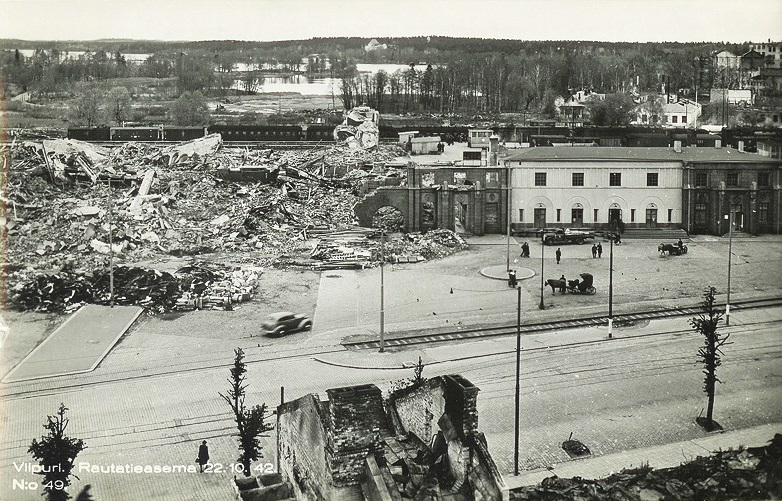
The ruins of the station building in autumn 1942.

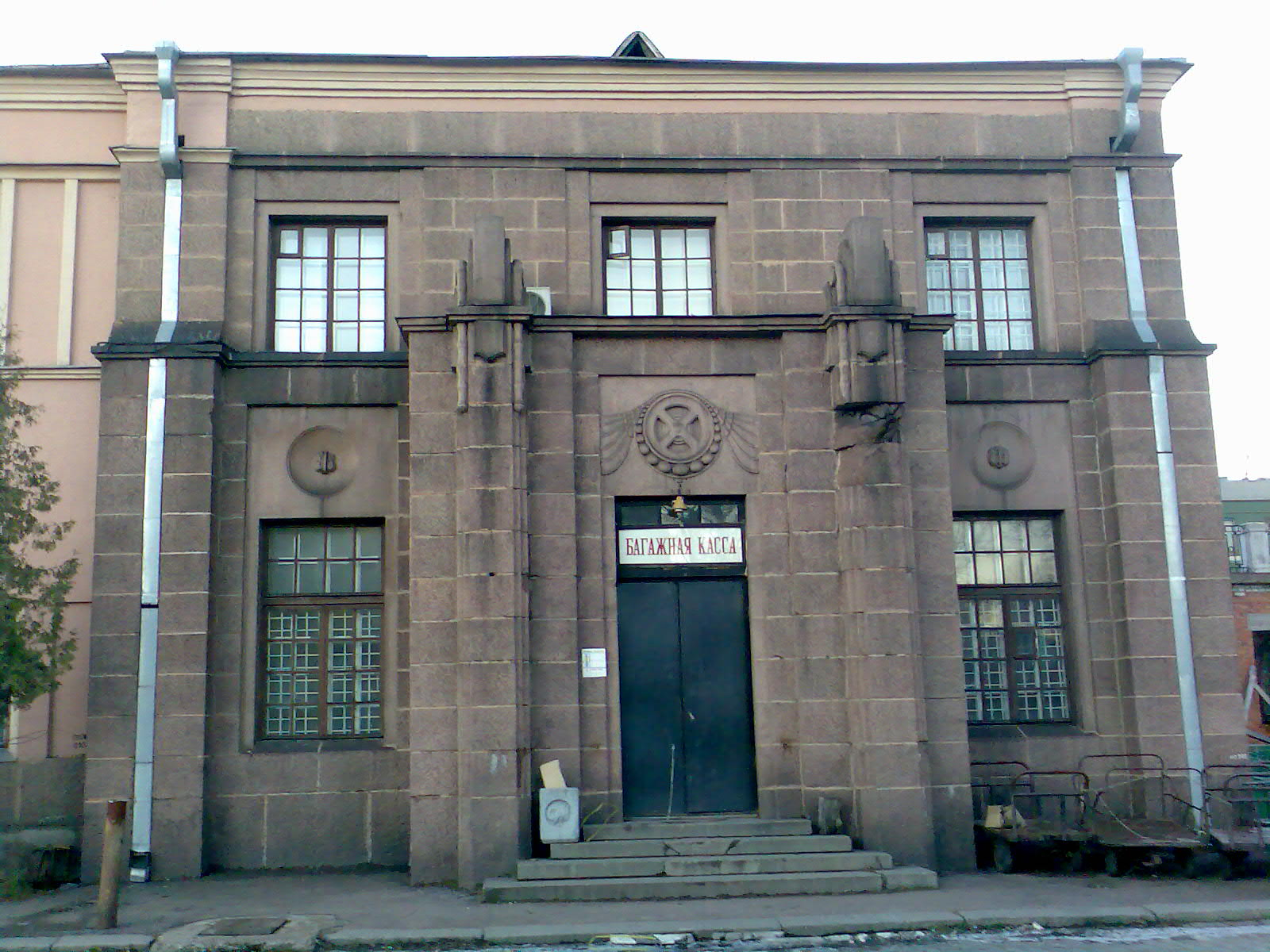
The cargo office, the only remaining part of the station.
