= Fabianinkatu 17 =

Building in Helsinki

Coordinates: 60°09′55.7″N 024°57′00.2″E

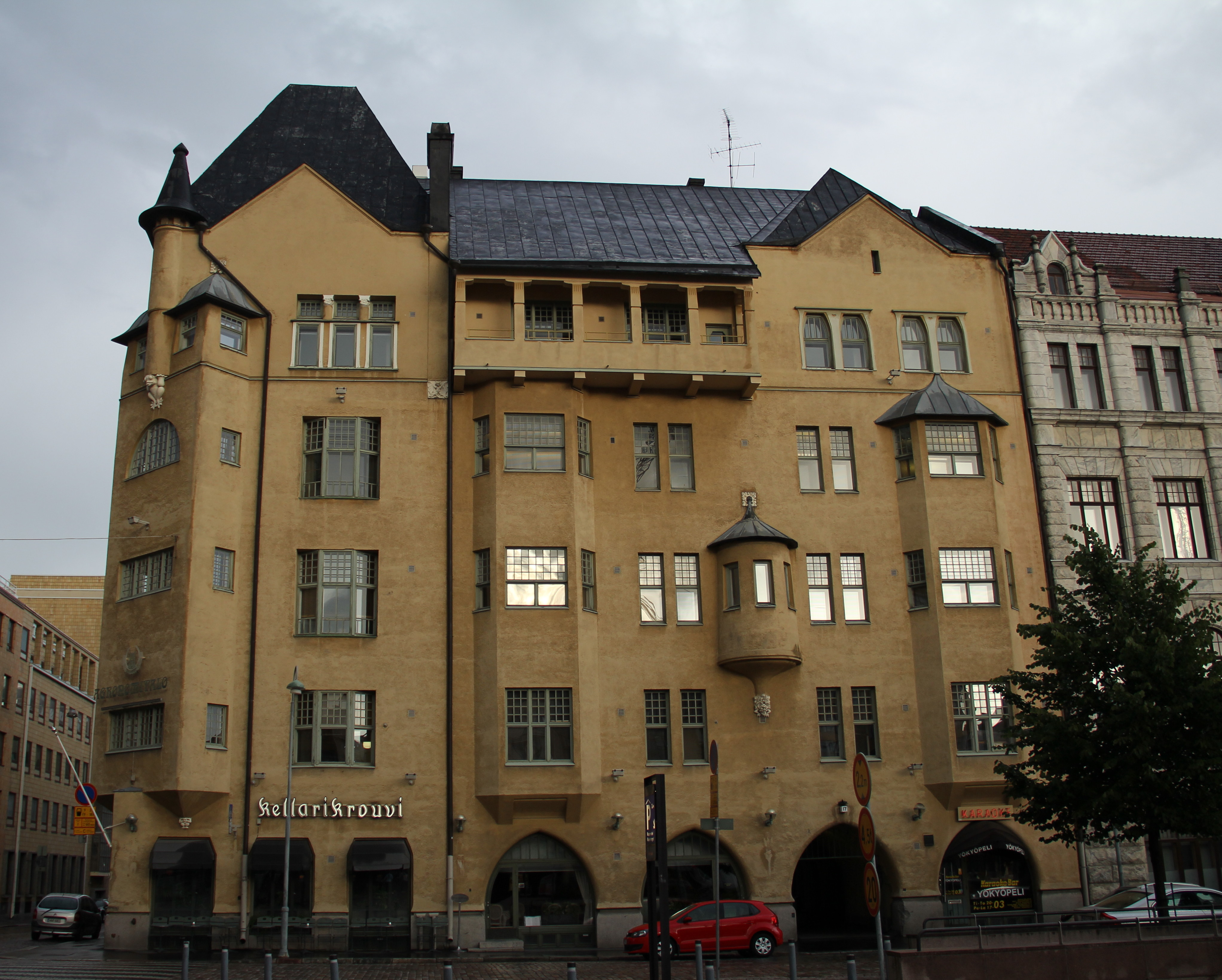
Façade facing Fabianinkatu (Kasarmitori)

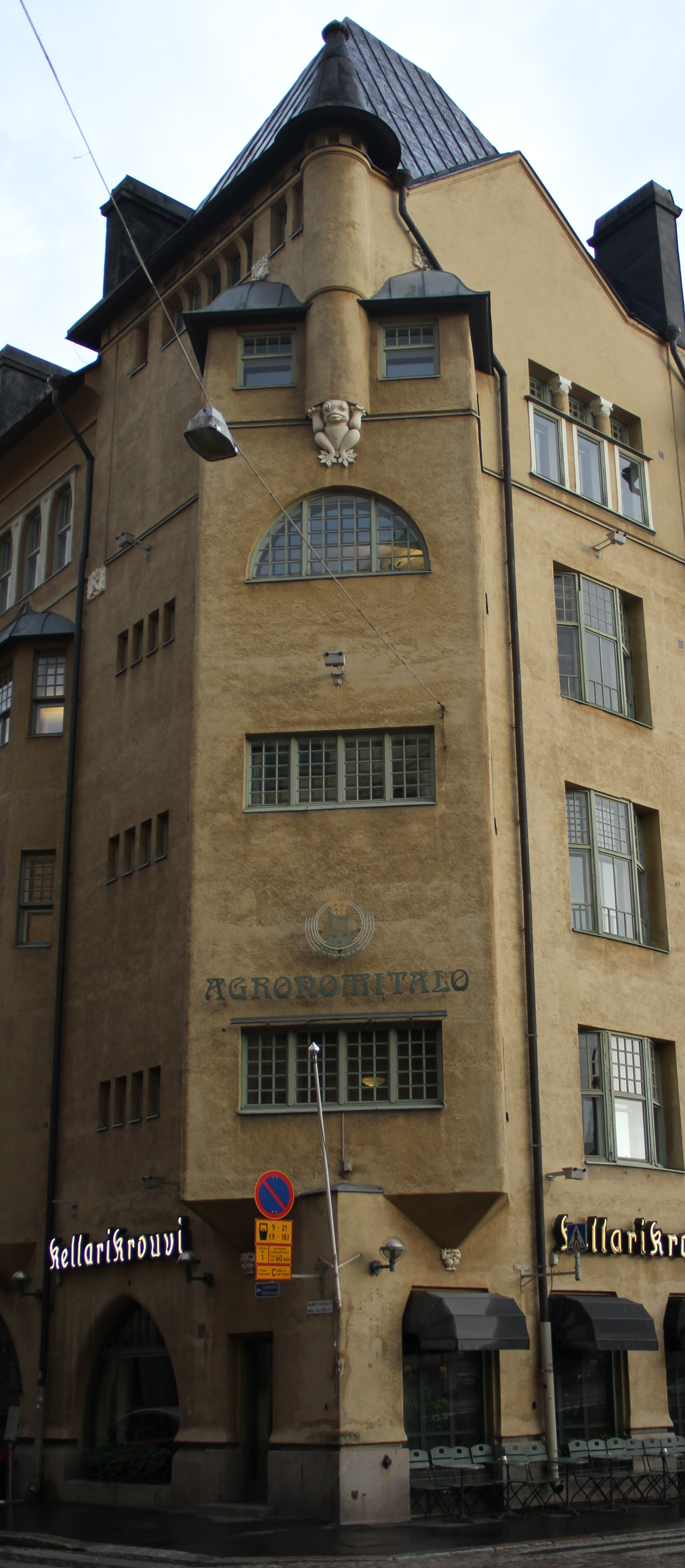
Corner of Fabianinkatu and Pohjoinen Makasiinikatu

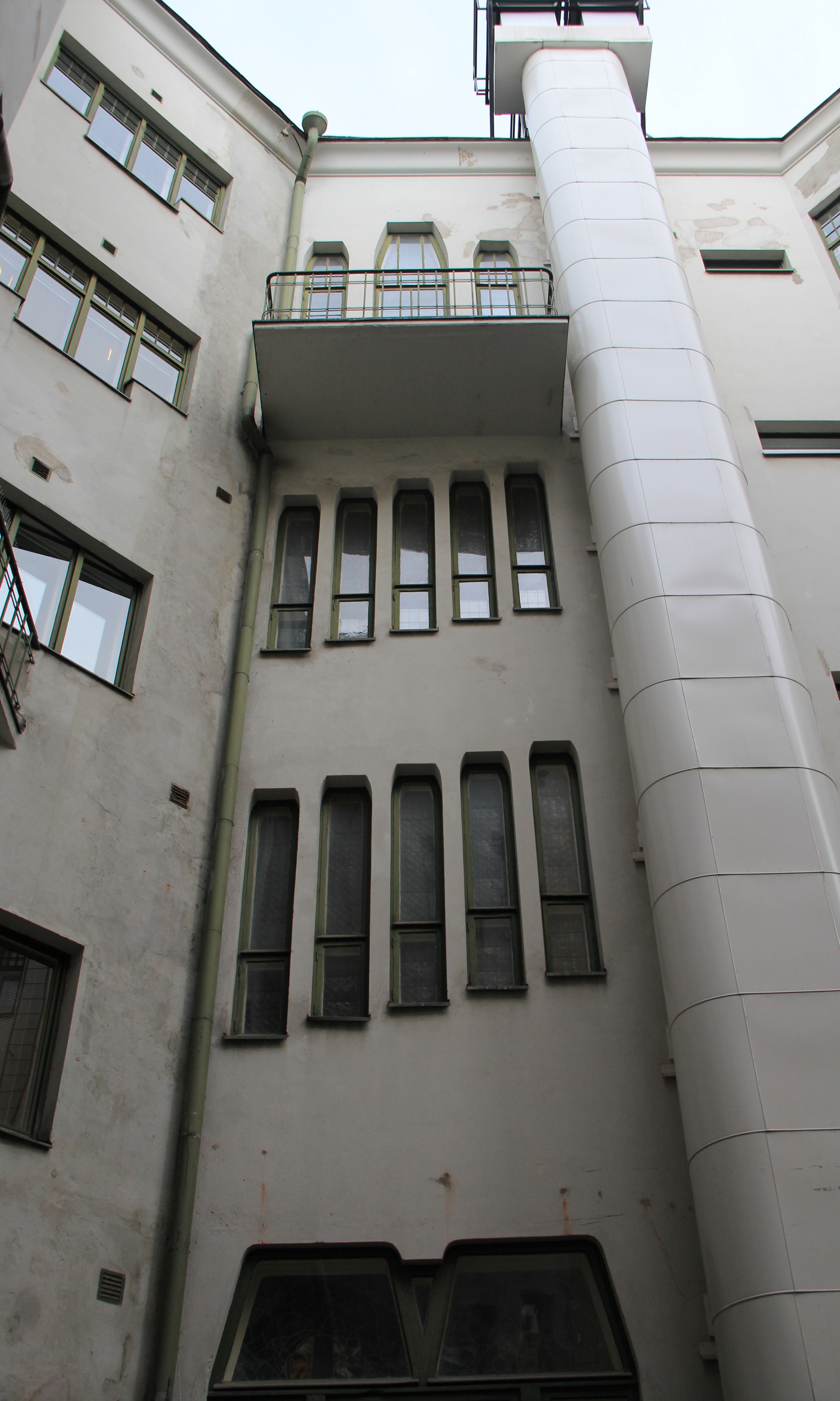
Courtyard with staircase windows; chimney serves a bakery

Fabianinkatu 17 is a national romantic-Art Nouveau building in central Helsinki. Built in 1900–1901 to a design by the architectural firm of Gesellius, Lindgren and Saarinen (Gesellius, Lindgren, Saarinen), it was originally a block of flats, but became increasingly used for offices and was for many years known as the Doctors' House (Finnish: Lääkäreiden talo). In 1953 Agronomiliitto, the Finnish Association of Agronomists, bought it, and it is now called Agronomitalo (Agronomy House).

== Building ==
The building is at the corner of Fabianinkatu and Pohjoinen Makasiinikatu; at this point, Fabianinkatu forms the east side of Kasarmitori (Barracks Square). In 1898 the brother's Axel, Georg and Ernst Ehrnrooth bought the site, which was then occupied like much of the area by a row of two-storey wooden buildings. Georg and Ernst Ehrnrooth subsequently sold their shares to two physicians, Axel Holmberg and Wilhelm Zilliacus. The building was then commissioned from Gesellius, Lindgren and Saarinen by a housing association and built-in 1900–1901.

It was one of the first blocks of flats in the area. Its national romantic-Art Nouveau style pioneered indigenous Finnish residential architecture and influenced later buildings by Grahn, Hedman & Wasastjerna and Toril and Nyberg. It rises five storeys, clad in rough yellow plaster. There is no cornice, but the main façade, facing the square, is interrupted asymmetrically by oriel windows of various shapes and a long balcony. The main façade and the corner, which is formed by geometric shapes, are ornamented with grotesques moulded in smooth plaster. The façade facing Pohjoinen Makasiinikatu is rhythmically pierced by bay windows. The roof is steeply pitched and again asymmetrical, with gables of varying heights; the architects' original reddish tiles have been replaced with copper.

The building was also unconventional in its interior layout. On each upper floor were two large apartments, 150–300 square metres (1,600–3,200 sq ft), which ran from the square to the courtyard and included professional space; doctors, in particular, were envisaged as residents. The rooms were large and well-lit and originally contained custom furniture designed by Louis Sparre and others. The interior was decorated with artistically carved wood using folk motifs. There are murals by Venny Soldan-Brofelt and soapstone and ceramic heating stoves. The building also included smaller flats.

The building attracted much attention when it was built. Another Finnish architect, Bertel Jung, reported that there was puzzlement as to whether it was "beautiful or ugly" and "[whether it could] be called architecture at all". He explained the architects' procedure as a rejection of the customary architectural requirements and of the notion of a block of flats in favour of the primacy of "home" and "a homely atmosphere".

== Later history ==
The large number of doctors within the building led to its becoming known as Lääkäreiden talo (Doctors' House). Over the years, it came to be used increasingly for offices. In 1953, it was acquired by Agronomiliitto for 53 million mk—half of which was financed by the proceeds of a gift of 10,000 kg of coffee beans made to the organisation in celebration of its 50th anniversary in 1947—and its name was changed to Agronomitalo (Agronomy House). The building was studied and wholly renovated in 1970–1981 and later renovations took place in 2001–2002 and in 2012, including installation of a new lift. In the 1990s Helsinki city planning document, it was designated as a commercial building, but in 2013–2014 the owner commissioned a study of the feasibility of returning part of it to residential use.

== Residents and tenants ==
Residents included the surgeon Richard Faltin, who lived there from 1913 to 1953; in 1904; he had unsuccessfully operated on Governor-General Nikolai Bobrikov after he was shot. Annie and Bertha Edelfelt, the sisters of the artist Albert Edelfelt, moved in during 1909; after their deaths in 1934, the paintings by their brother from their flat were given to the Ateneum. Commercial tenants on the ground floor have included the Nordiska Antikvariska Bokhandeln - Pohjoismainen Antikvaarinen Kirjakauppa (Nordic Antiquarian Bookshop, 1918–2001) and Kellarikrouvi, a restaurant (since 1964).

== Details ==
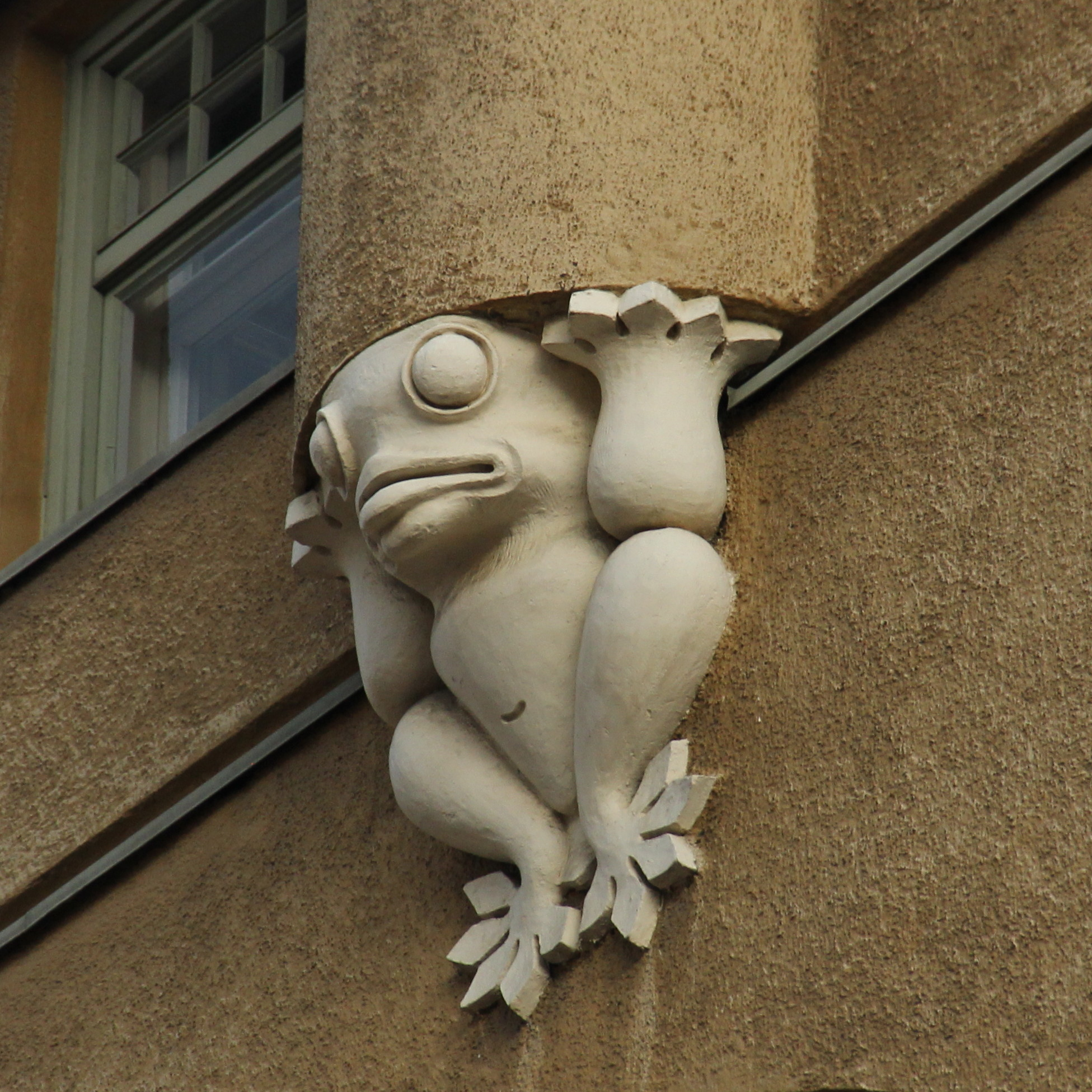

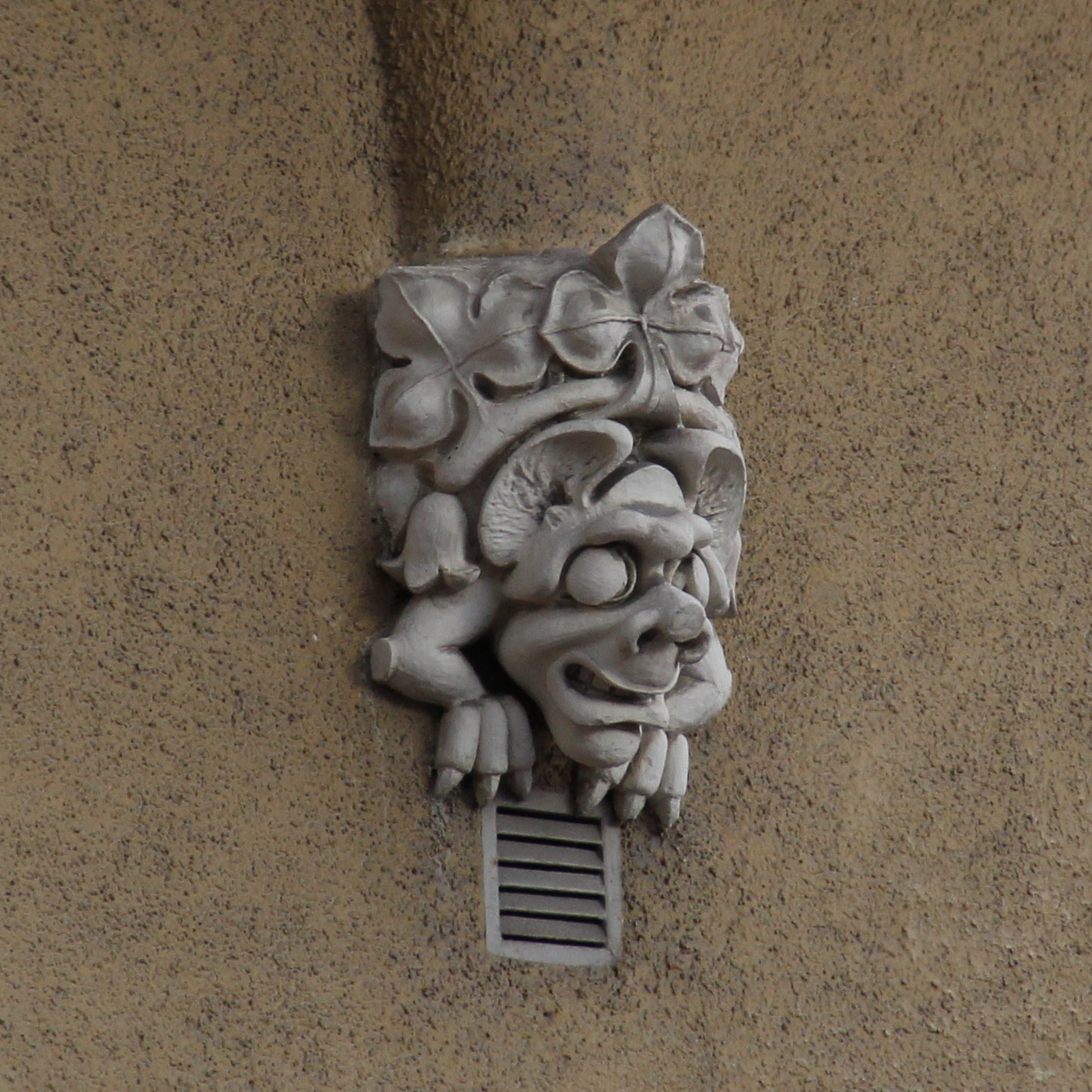

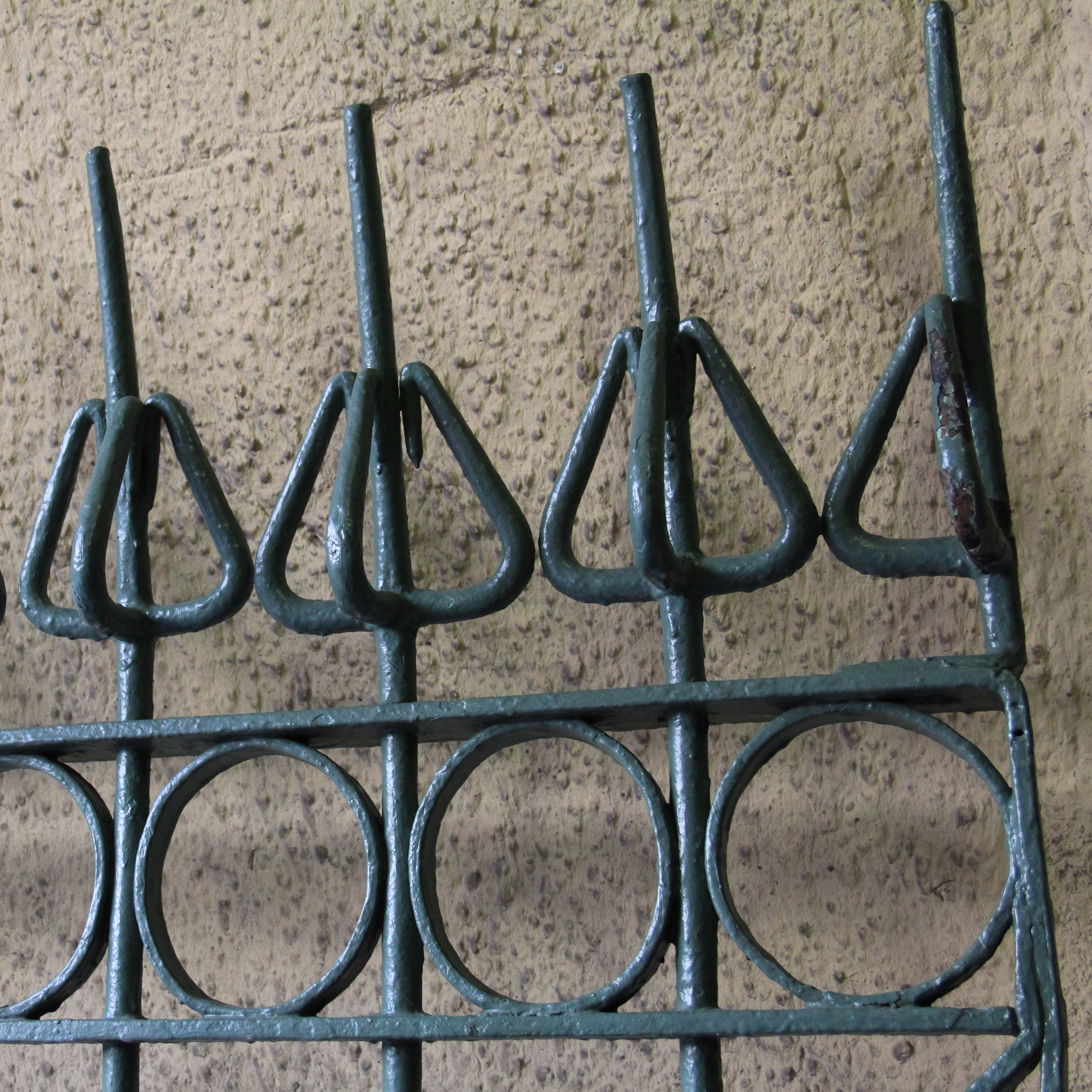
Wrought-iron gate, Fabianinkatu entrance

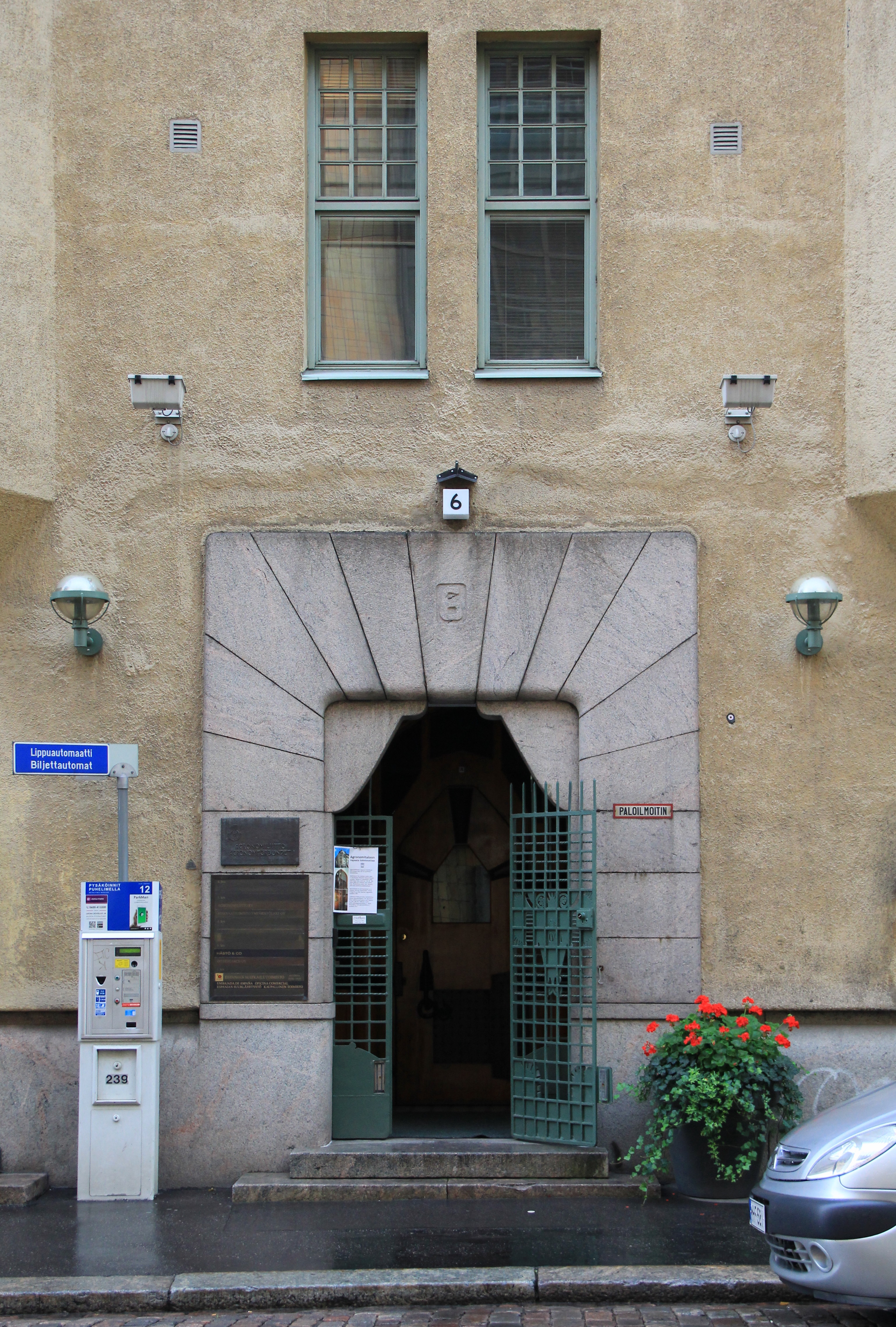
Entrance in Pohjoinen Makasiinikatu
