= Lahti Town Hall =

- Lahden kaupungintalo
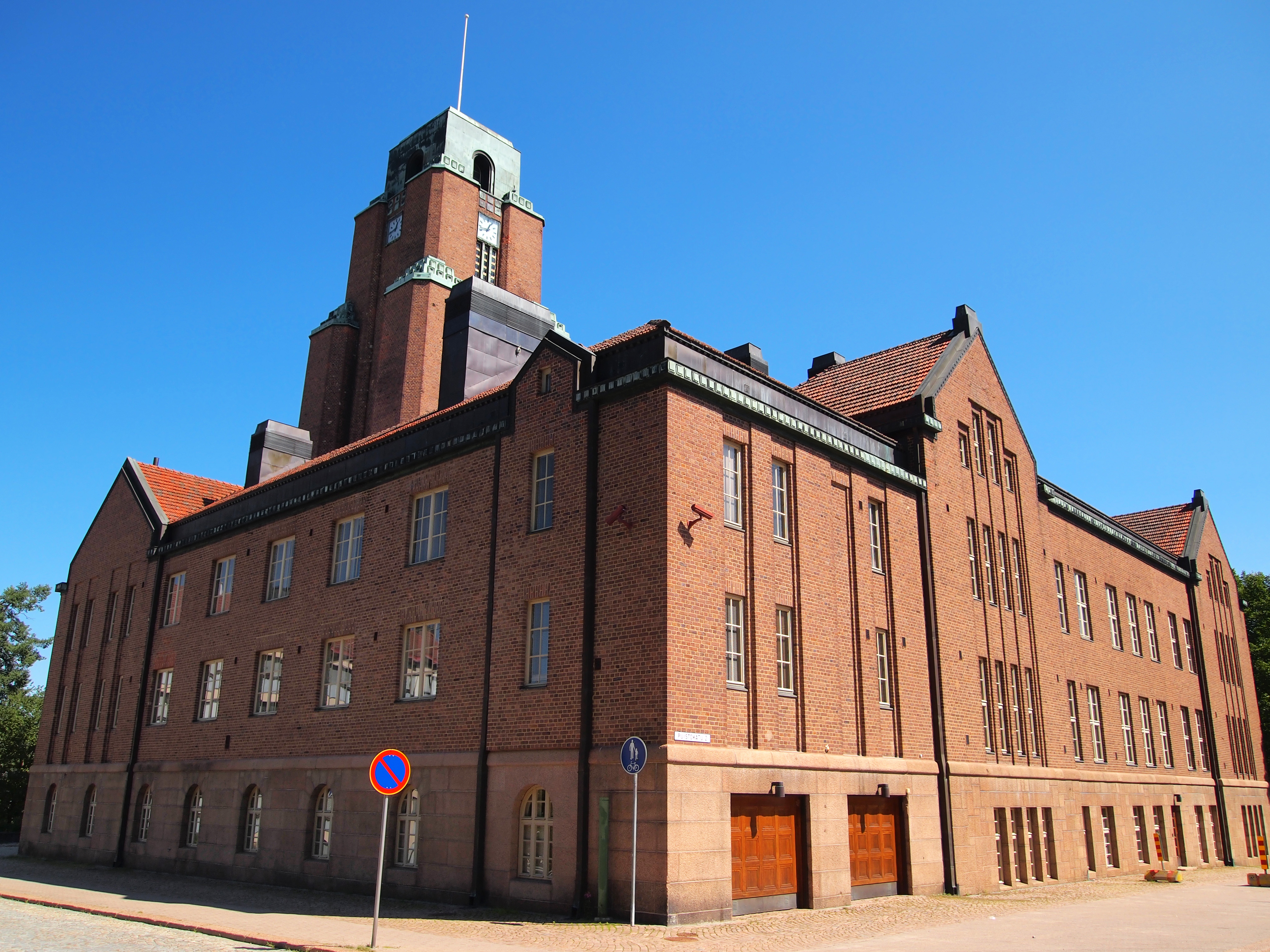
- Interactive map of the Lahti Town Hall area

General information
- Type: Administration building
- Location: Lahti, Finland
- Coordinates: 60°58′49″N 25°39′19″E
- Construction started: 1911
- Completed: 1912

Design and construction
- Architect: Eliel Saarinen

Lahti Town Hall was designed in 1911 by Finnish architect Eliel Saarinen. The building was completed in 1912.

Material used for building, dark bricks, were brought from Sweden.
