= House doctor =

House doctor may refer to:

- A resident physician of a hospital, rehabilitation facility, hotel, etc.
- House Doctor, TV show
- Pre-registration house officer
- Senior house officer
- A general practitioner (huisarts in Dutch)

== See also ==
- Dr. Gregory House, main character in the TV series House
- Doctor's House (disambiguation)
- Doctor in the House (disambiguation)
