= Doctor in the House =

Doctor in the House may refer to:

- Doctor in the House (novel), a 1952 novel by Richard Gordon
  - Doctor in the House (film), a 1954 British film adaptation of the novel
    - Doctor in the House (franchise), seven British and Australian television series inspired by the film series
      - Doctor in the House (TV series), the first series

== See also ==
- "Doctorin' the House", a song by Coldcut from the album What's That Noise?
- Doctor's House (disambiguation)
- House doctor (disambiguation)
- Is There a Doctor in the House? (disambiguation)
