= Loja Saarinen =

Finnish-American textile artist and sculptor (1879–1968)

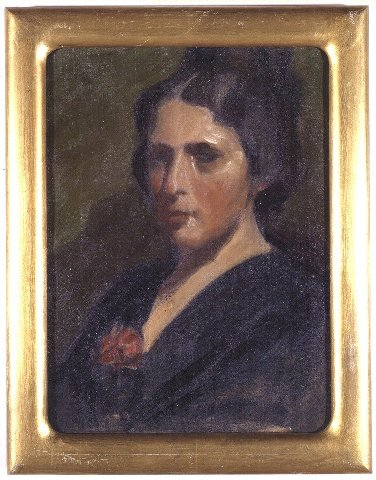
- Born: Minna Carolina Mathilde Louise Gesellius; March 15, 1879; Helsinki, Grand Duchy of Finland, Russian Empire
- Died: April 21, 1968 (aged 89)
- Known for: Textile art, weaving, sculpture
- Spouse: Eliel Saarinen
- Children: Eero Saarinen; Pipsan Saarinen Swanson
- Relatives: Herman Gesellius (brother)

Minna Carolina Mathilde Louise "Loja" Gesellius (March 15, 1879 – April 21, 1968) was a Finnish-American textile artist and sculptor. She founded the weaving department at the Cranbrook Academy of Art in Michigan. She also led her own studio, the Studio Loja Saarinen, which designed many of the textiles used in buildings designed by her husband, the architect Eliel Saarinen.

== Background ==
She was born March 16, 1879, in Helsinki, Finland, and studied art at the Helsinki University of Art and Design (1898–99) and Drawing School of the Finnish Art Association (1899–1902), and sculpture under Jean Antoine Injalbert at the Académie Colarossi in Paris. Her older brother was the architect Herman Gesellius.

== Career ==
Loja Saarinen started her career in 1928 when she founded one of the most productive weaving departments in the United States at the Cranbrook Educational Community. Saarinen was heavily influenced by Swedish craft tradition. She was one of the first artists to bring Scandinavian design to America. Her most substantial work was for Kingswood School where her studio designed tapestries, rugs, curtains, and upholstery.

Saarinen's work is characterized by simple geometric designs in subtle light and dark contrasts, with a frequent use of complementary colors.

One-Person Exhibitions:

- Architectural League of New York, 1931
- Detroit Institute of Arts, 1932
- Norfolk Museum of Arts and Sciences, 1937
- Cincinnati Museum of Art, 1938
- Toledo Museum of Art, 1938
- Berea College, 1943
- Jacques Seligmann Gallery, New York City 1957 (two-person)
- Cranbrook Academy of Art, 1980
