= Hvitträsk =

Studio home in Kirkkonummi, Finland

Coordinates: 60°10′53″N 024°31′12″E

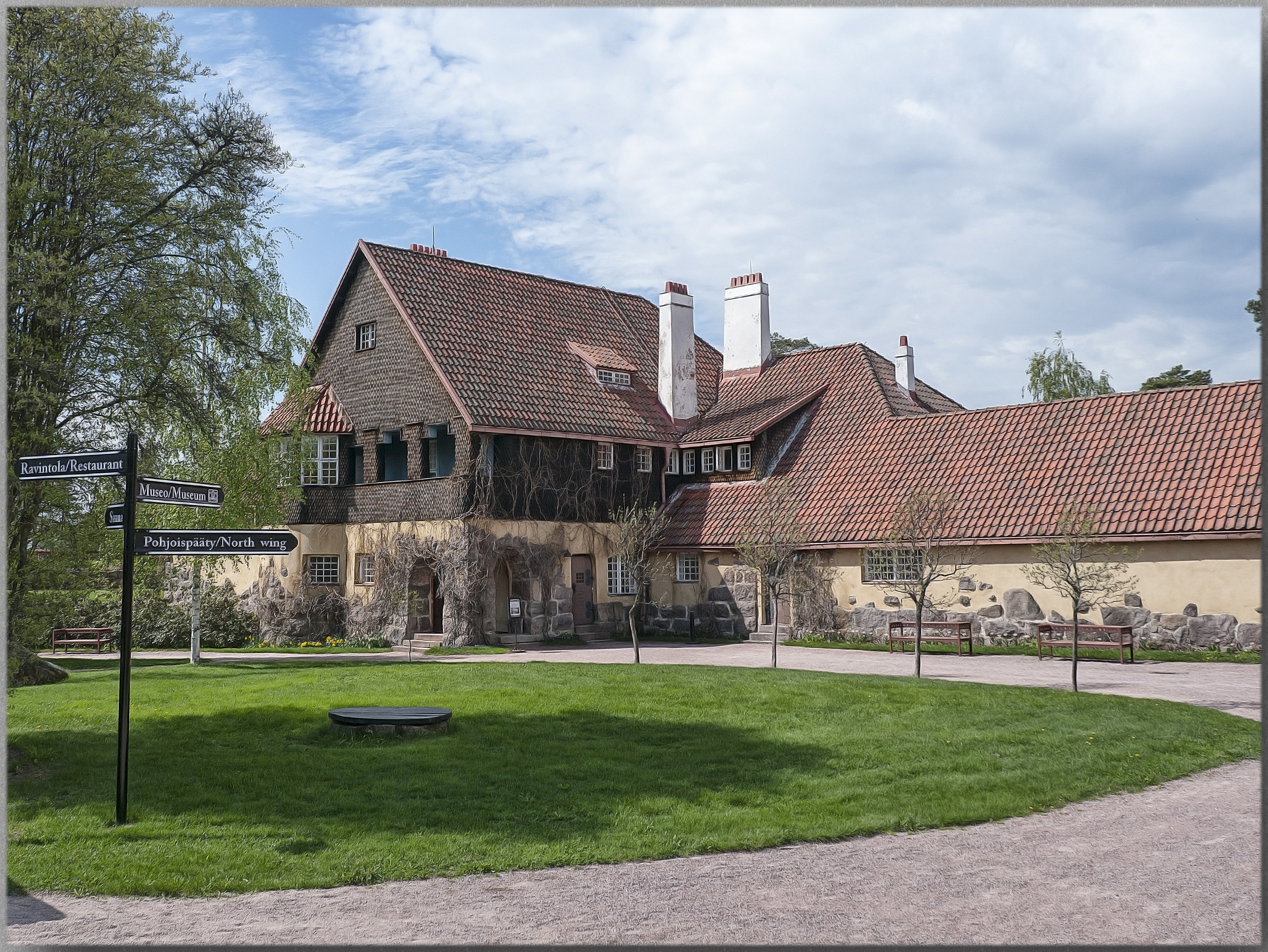
Hvitträsk

Hvitträsk is a mansion complex in Kirkkonummi, Finland, about 30 kilometers (19 mi) west of Helsinki. It was designed as a studio home by the members of the Finnish architecture firm Gesellius, Lindgren, Saarinen, later becoming the private residence of Eliel Saarinen. It is operated as a museum.

== Description ==
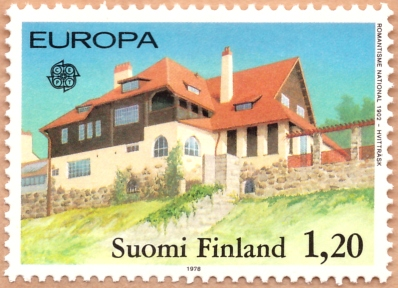
Postage stamp from 1978

The development was started when the plot was purchased by the company in 1901. The construction was mostly completed by 1903. The house was named after Lake Vitträsk, beside which it was built. The name [H]vitträsk literally means 'white lake'. Today Hvitträsk is a museum open to the public. The red-roofed manor structure facing the lake is the main museum building, and the brownish structure separated on the other side by a yard is the cafeteria. There is also a smaller sauna down by the lake.

In 1922 Lindgren's home in the north side partially burned down. Eliel Saarinen's son Eero Saarinen designed a new building in its place in 1929–33.

== Gallery ==
Exterior
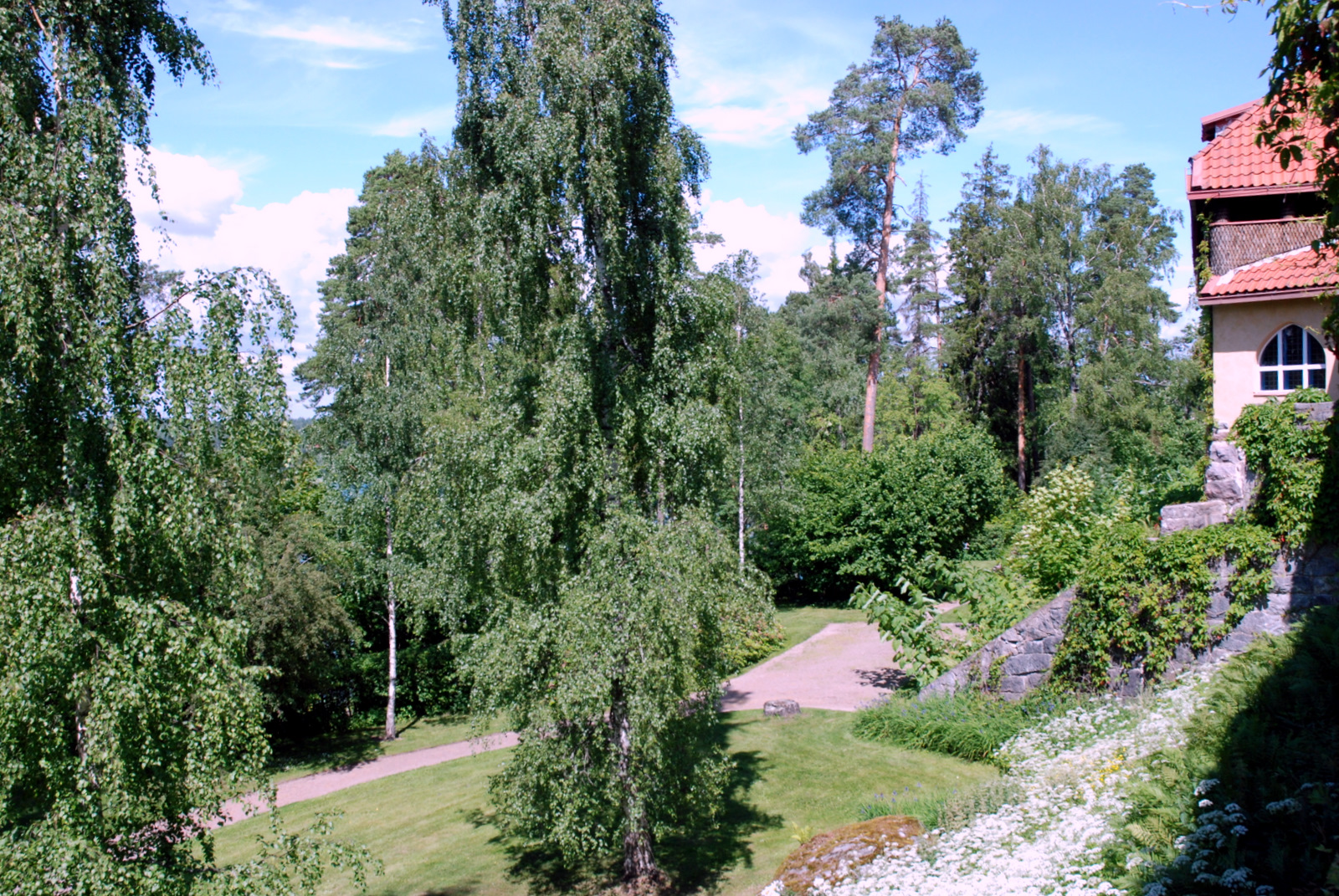
View of the lakeside

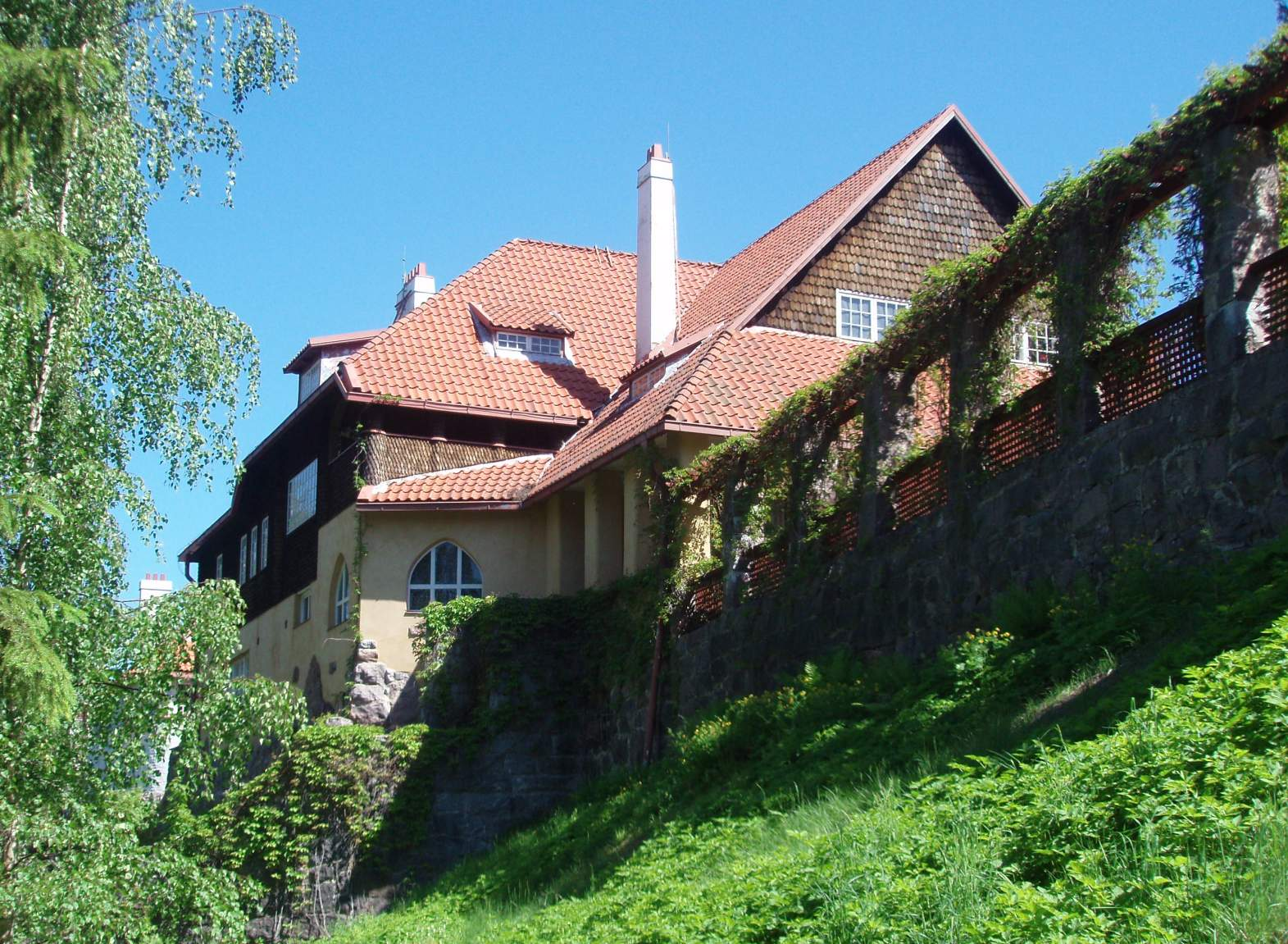
View of the museum building from the lakeside

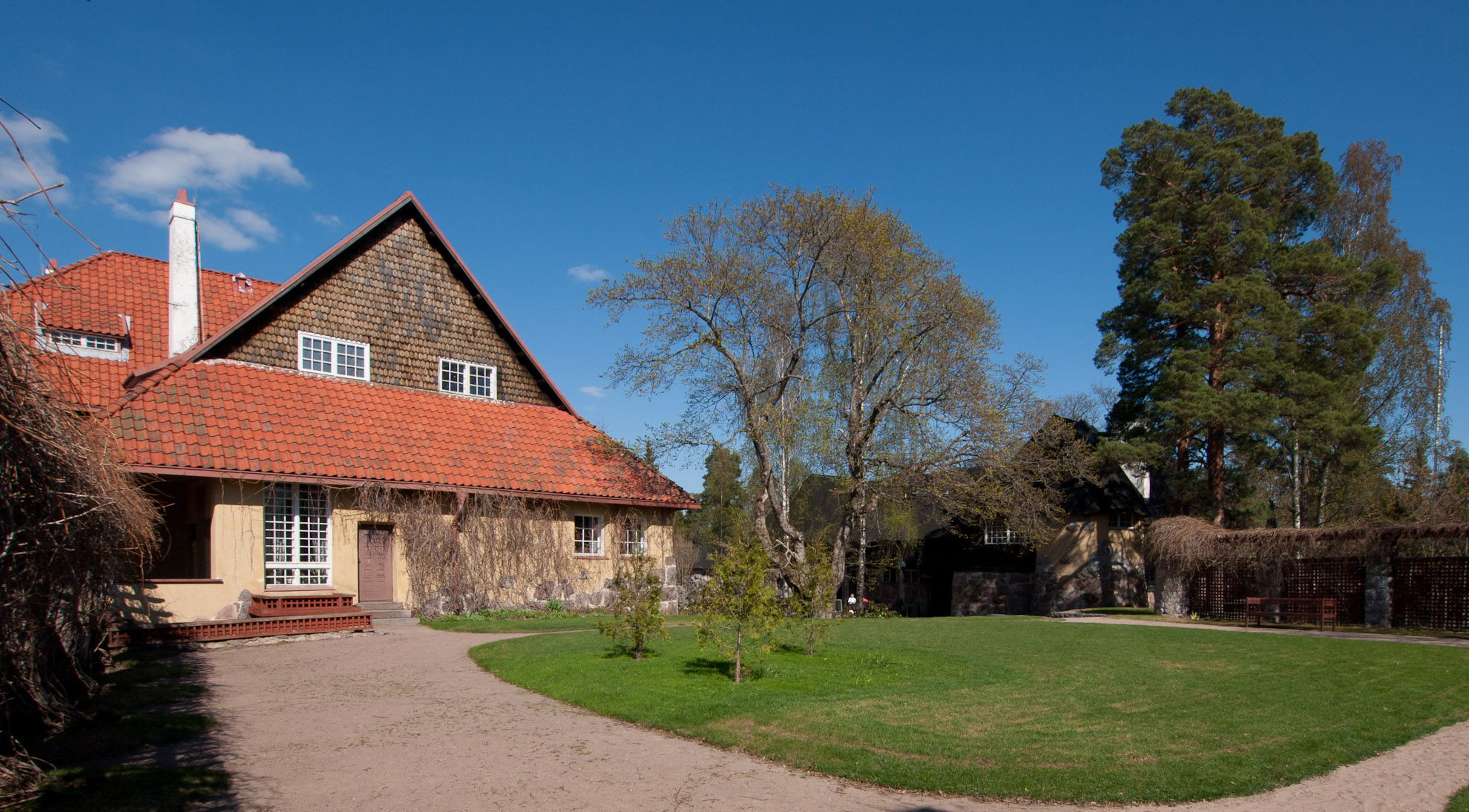
Side of the museum, with the cafeteria visible on the right

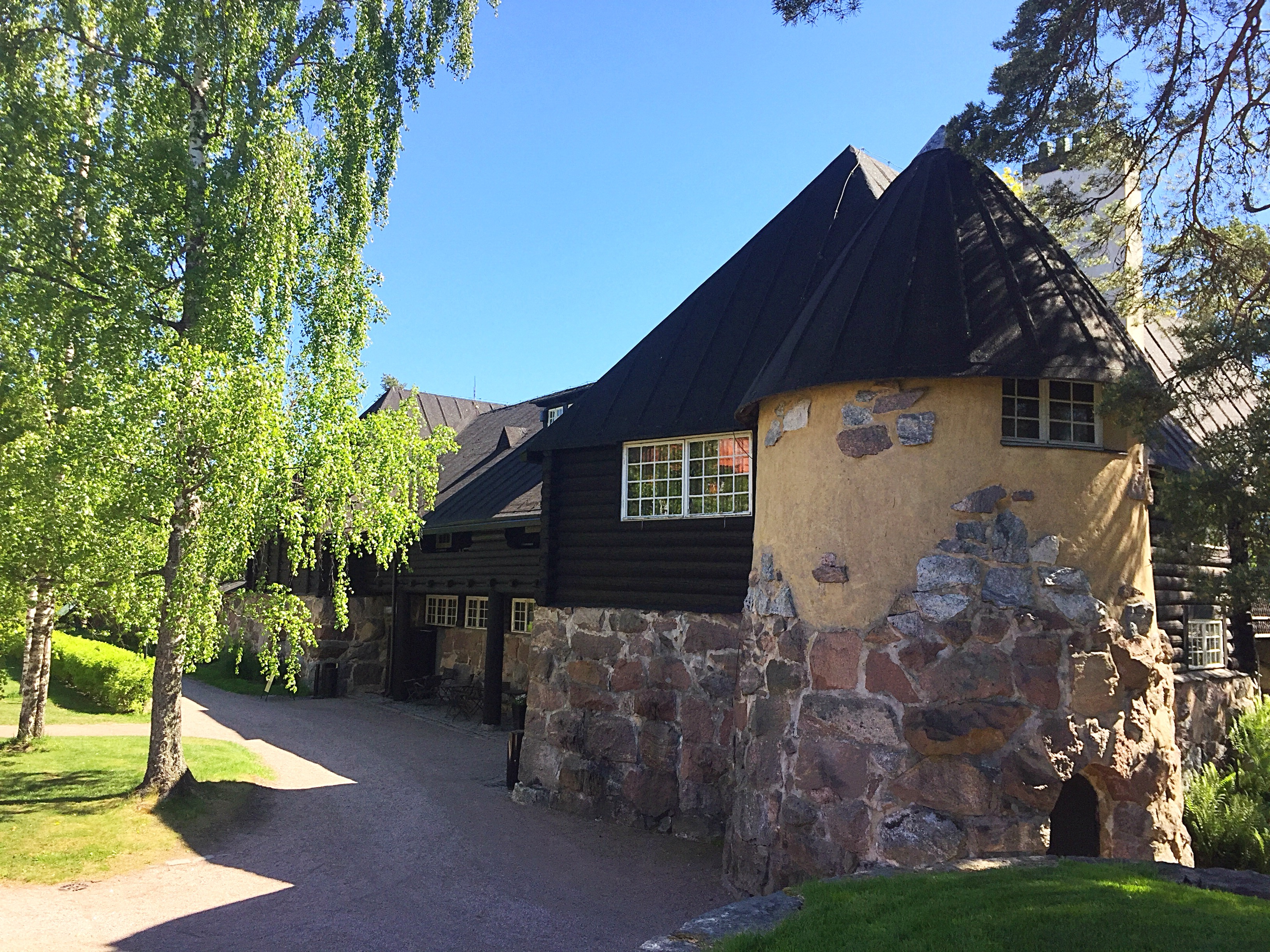
The cafeteria

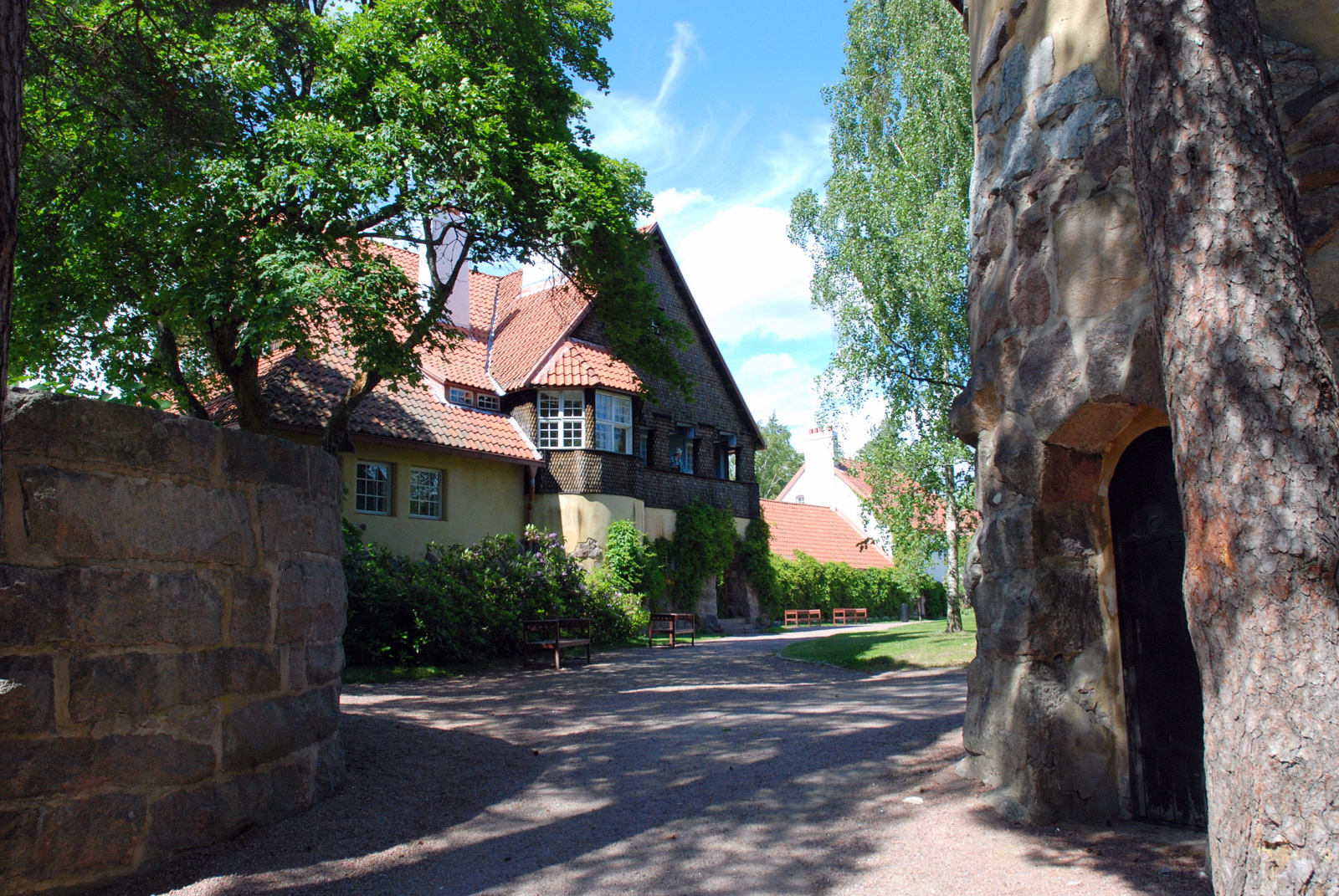
Museum seen from the cafeteria

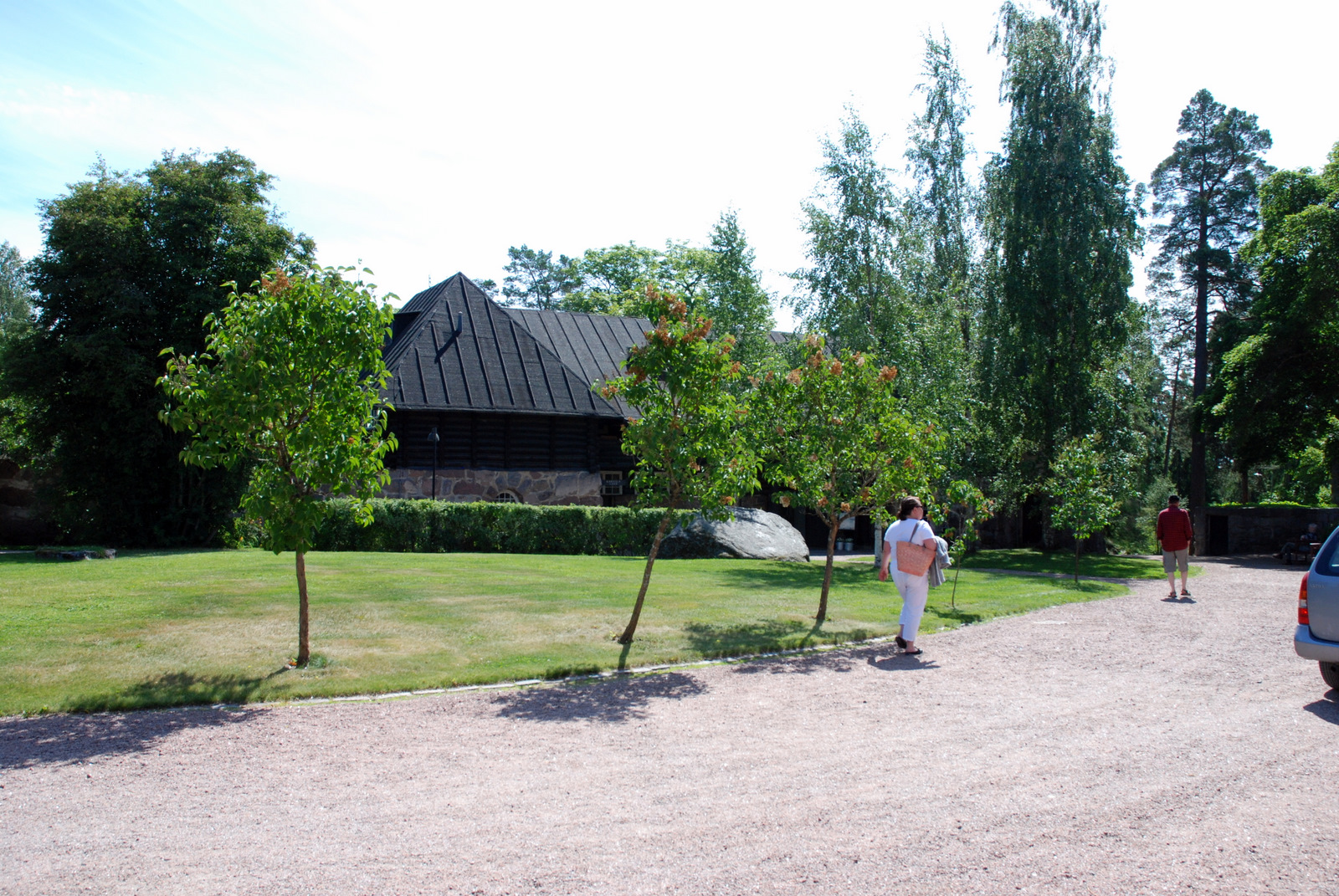
Road from the opposite northeast side, with the cafeteria ahead

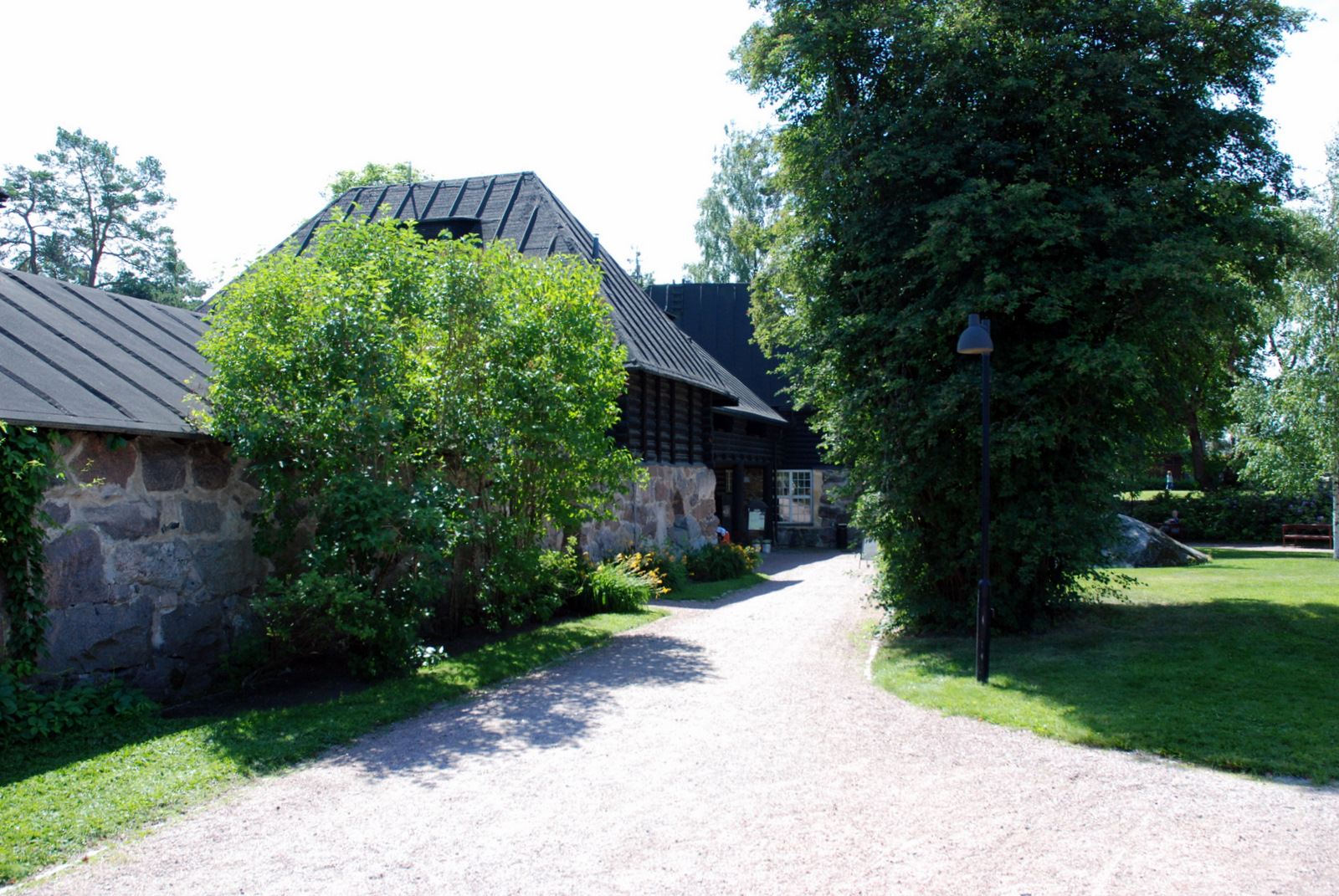
Cafeteria front, where the museum building would now be on the right

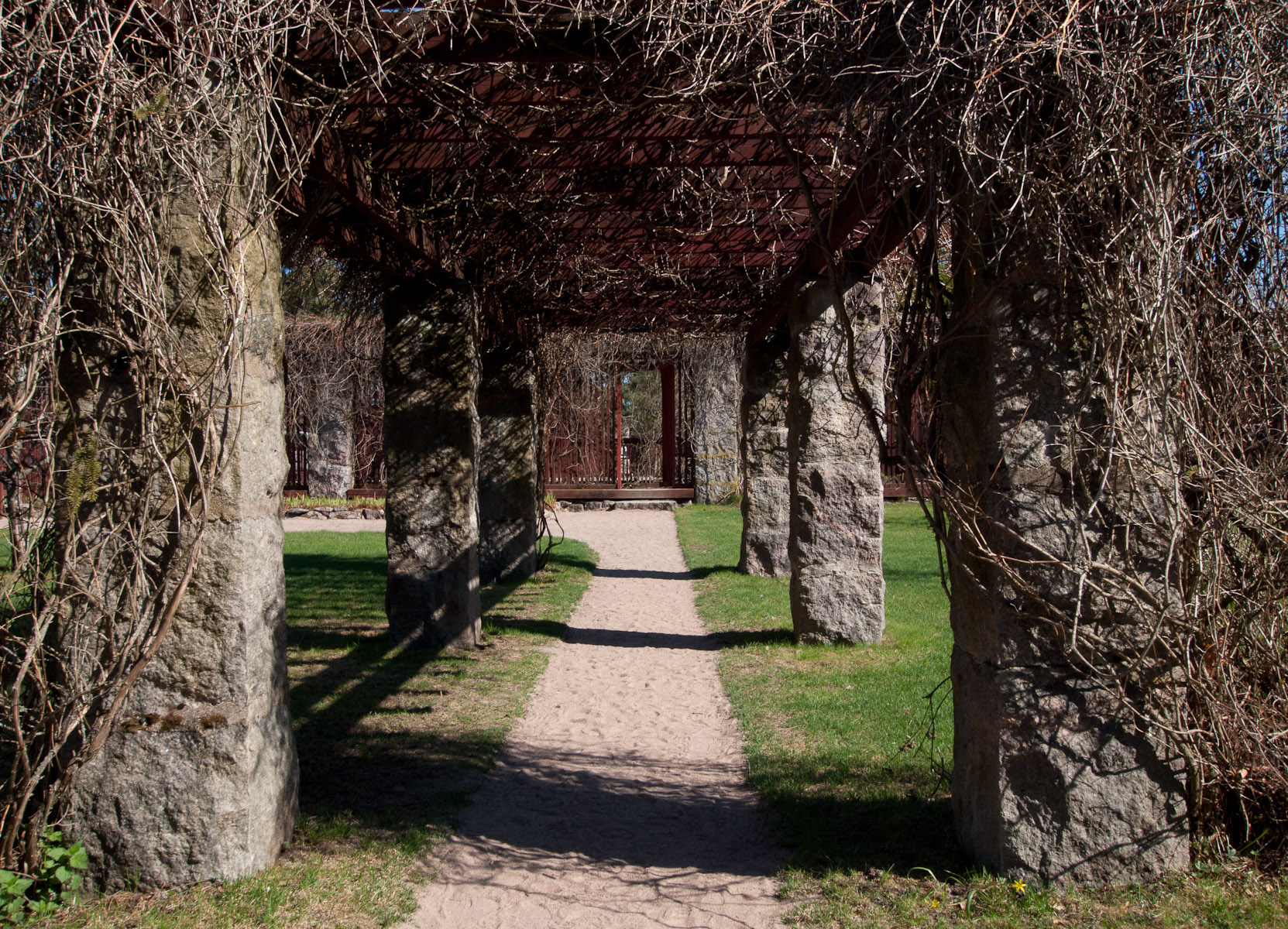
Courtyard structure

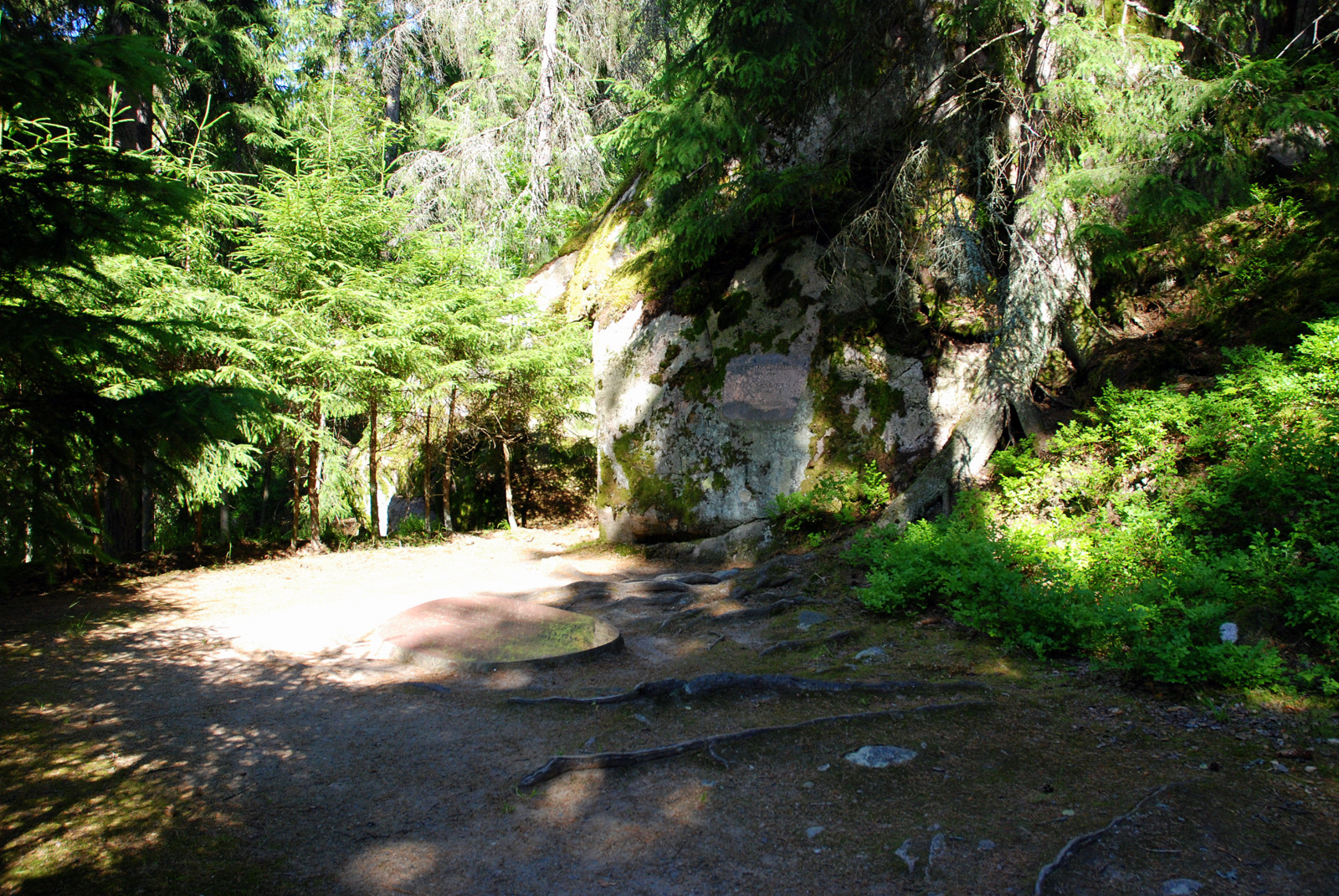
The gravesite of Eliel Saarinen, his wife Loja and Herman Geselius
Interior
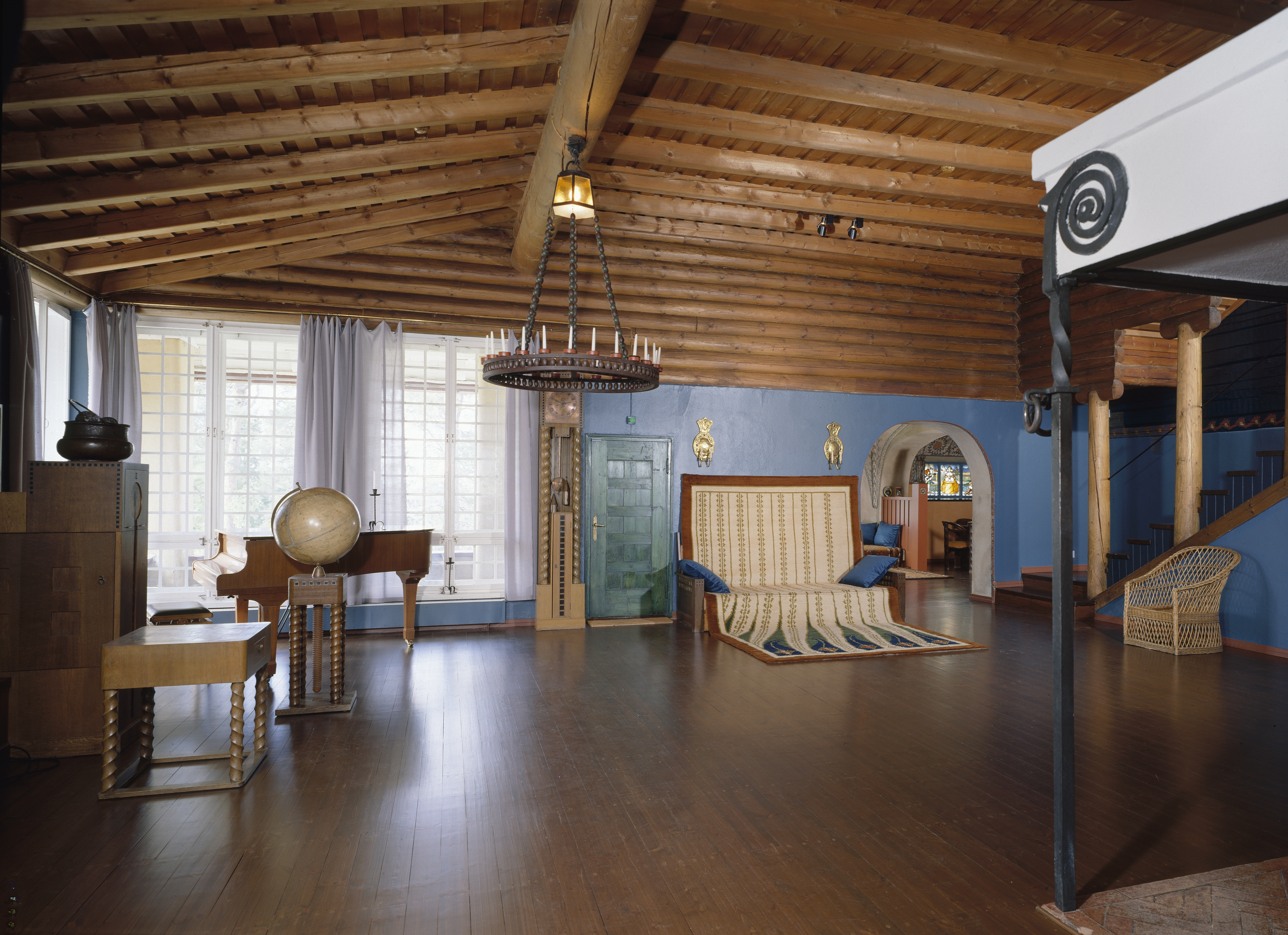
Living Room

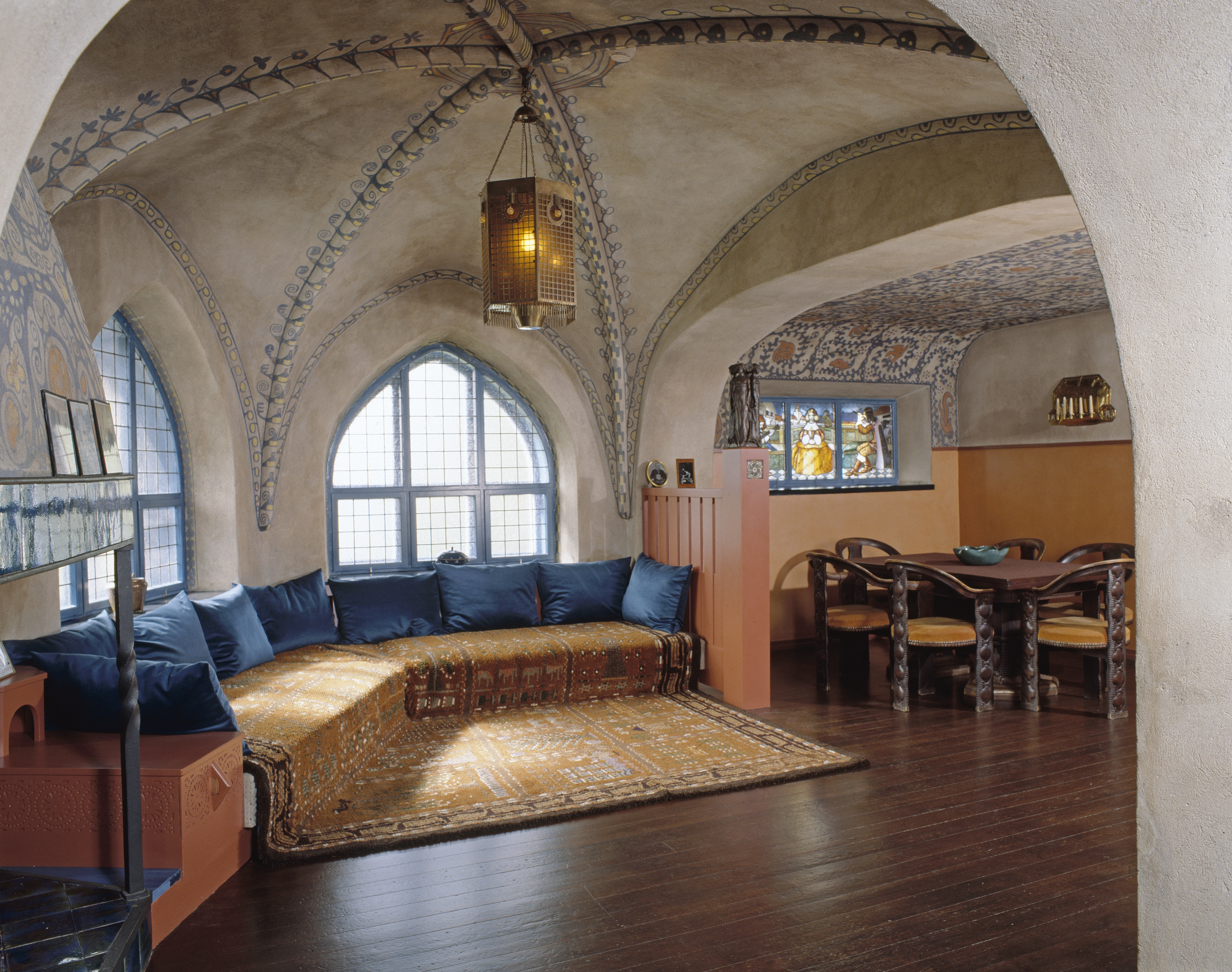
Dining Room

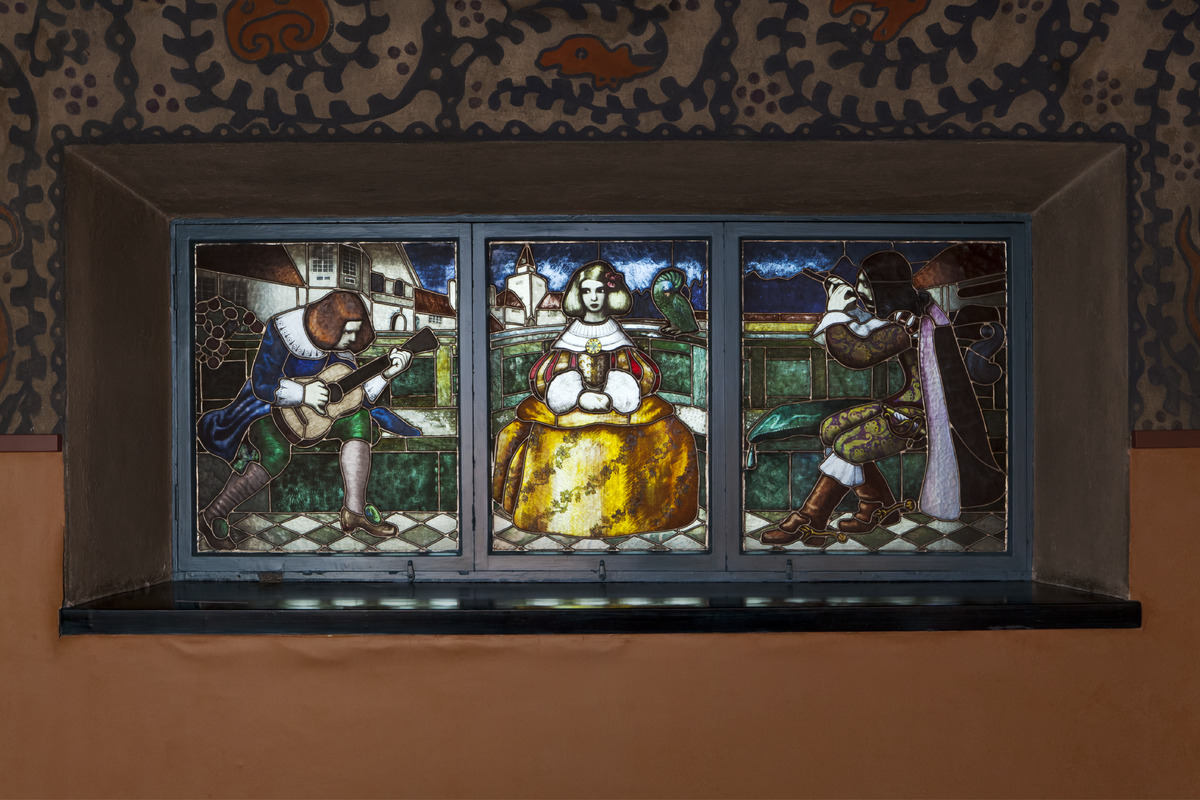
Stained glass Rival Suitors by Olga Gummerus-Ehrström, 1905

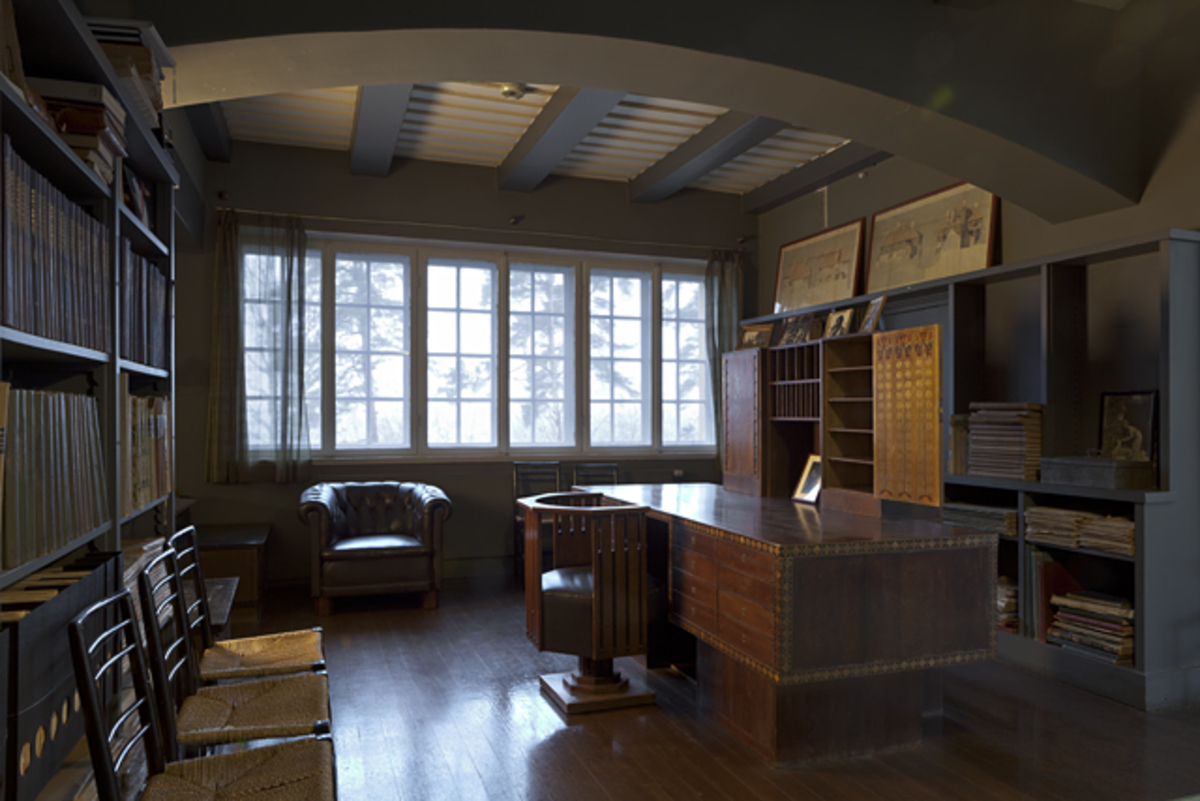
Library

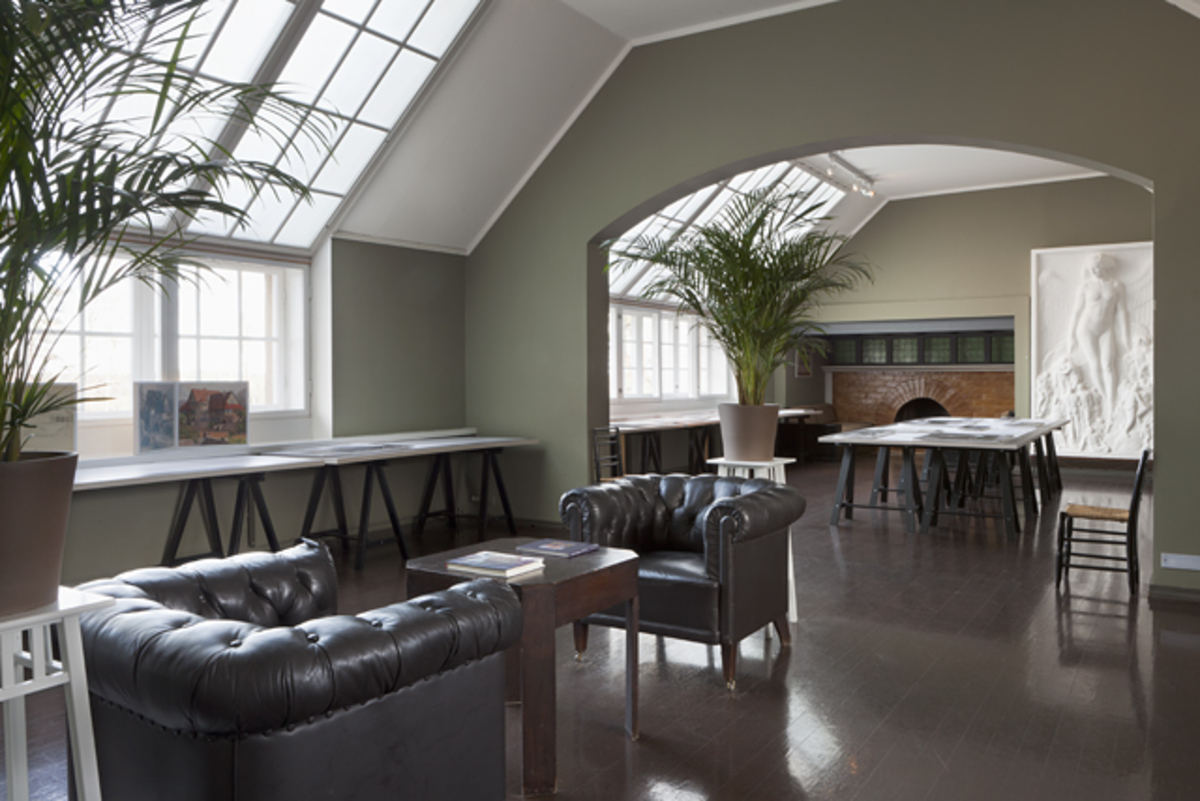
Atelier

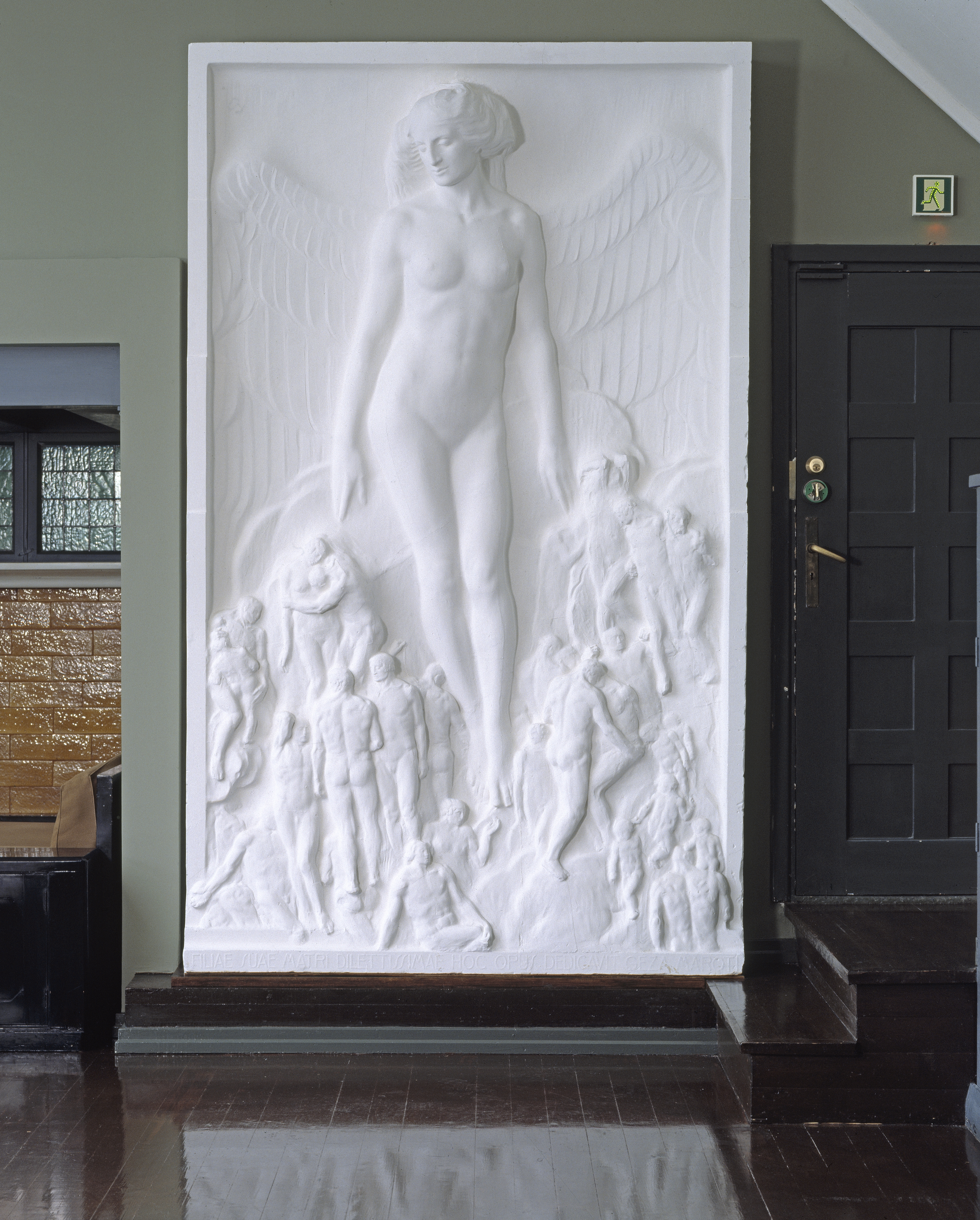
Géza Maróti's relief The Angel of Resurrection in the atelier

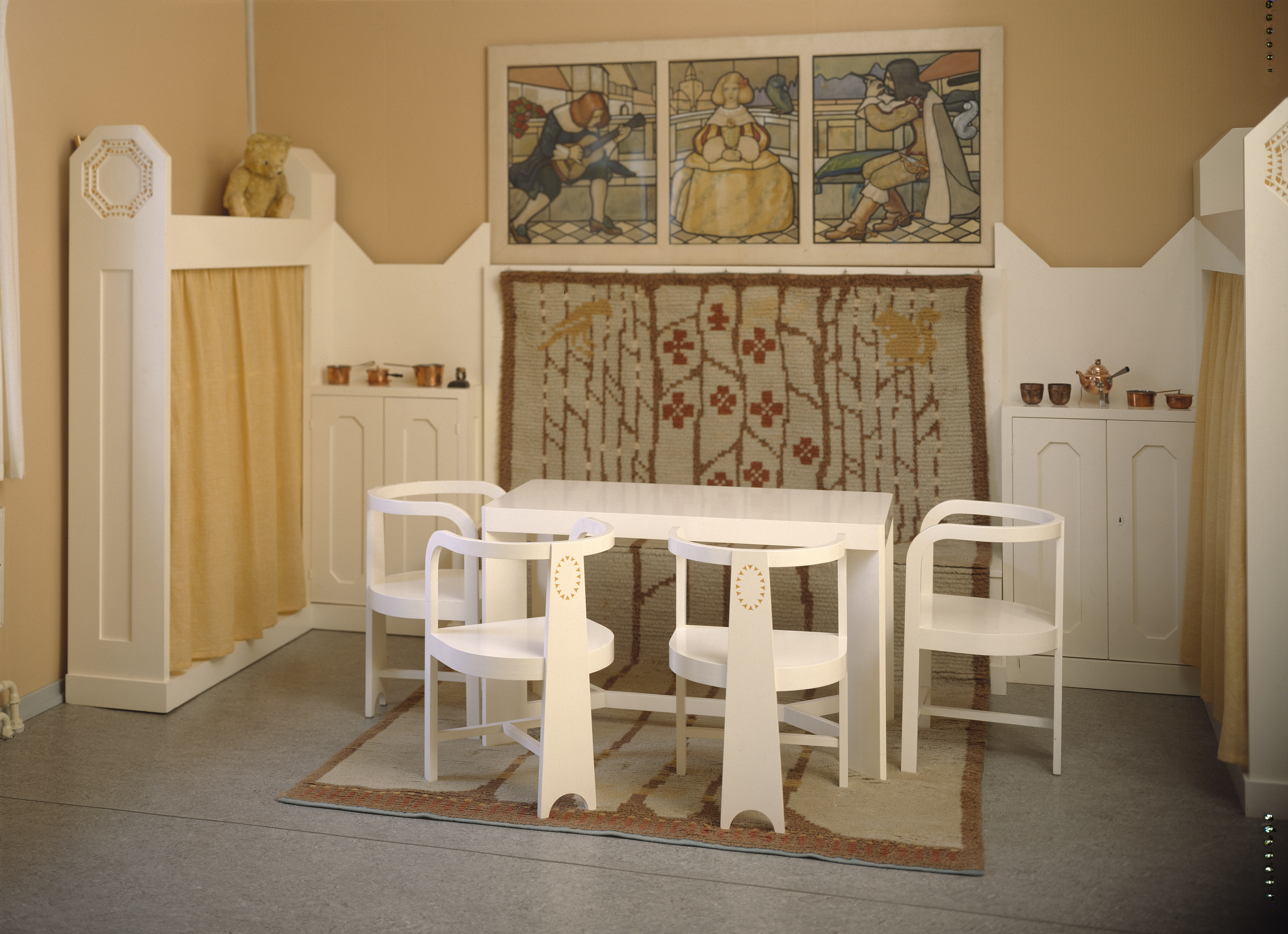
Playroom

== Featured in publications ==
- Moderne Bauformen 6, no. 4 (1907): 159–62;8, no. 8 (1909): 350, 353.
- Hemma och Ute 3, (August 1913): 210–14; 3 (September 1913): 234–5.
- American Architect and Architectural Review 124 (September 26, 1923): 19 pls.
- Arkkitehti nos. 11–12 (1943): 24.
- Architectural Review 139 (February 1966): 152–54.
- Space Design no. 133 (September 1975): 91–94
- Connaissance des Arts no. 238 (December 1971): 108–13, 192.
- New York Times 13 February 1966, VI, p. 64.
