= Eliel Saarinen =

Finnish and American architect (1873–1950)

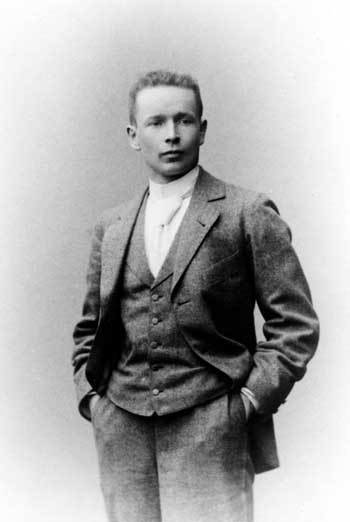
- Saarinen in early 1900s
- Born: Gottlieb Eliel Saarinen; August 20, 1873; Rantasalmi, Grand Duchy of Finland
- Died: July 1, 1950 (aged 76); Bloomfield Hills, Michigan, U.S.
- Occupation: Architect
- Spouse: Loja Saarinen
- Children: Eero Saarinen; Pipsan Saarinen Swanson
- Relatives: Herman Gesellius (brother-in-law)
- Awards: AIA Gold Medal
- Buildings: Helsinki Central railway station; National Museum of Finland; Vyborg railway station; Hvitträsk; Kleinhans Music Hall
- Projects: Finnish pavilion at the 1900 Exposition Universelle; Cranbrook Academy of Art
- Design: Eliel Saarinen's Tribune Tower design (1922); Finnish markka banknotes (1922)

Gottlieb Eliel Saarinen (/ˈsɑːrɪnən/, Finnish: [ˈeliel ˈsɑːrinen]; August 20, 1873 – July 1, 1950) was a Finnish and American architect, designer, and urban planner. Saarinen worked in a diverse range of styles in his native Finland and, after emigrating in 1923, the United States. He was the father of architect Eero Saarinen and designer Pipsan Saarinen Swanson. Through his rejected 1922 design of the Chicago Tribune building he indirectly played a significant role in the influence and development of Art Deco architecture.

== Early life and work in Finland ==
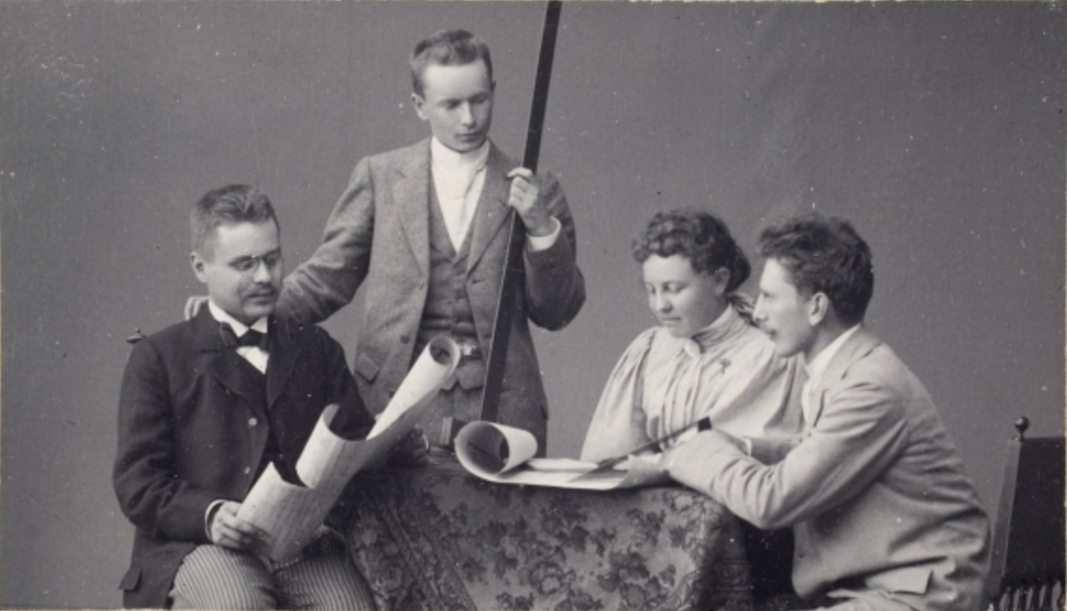
Armas Lindgren, Eliel Saarinen, Albertina Östman, and Herman Gesellius in the late 1890s

Saarinen was born in Rantasalmi on 20 August 1873 to Lutheran clergyman Juho Saarinen and his wife, Selma, née Broms. Saarinen was educated in Helsinki at the Helsinki University of Technology. From 1896 to 1905 he worked as a partner with Herman Gesellius and Armas Lindgren at the firm Gesellius, Lindgren, Saarinen. His first major work with the firm, the Finnish pavilion at the Paris 1900 World Fair, exhibited an extraordinary convergence of stylistic influences: Finnish wooden architecture, the British Gothic Revival, and the Jugendstil. Saarinen's early manner was later christened the Finnish National Romanticism and culminated in the Helsinki Central railway station (designed 1904, constructed 1910–14).

From 1910 to 1915 he worked on the extensive city-planning project of Munksnäs-Haga and later published a book on the subject. In January 1911 he became a consultant in city planning for Tallinn, Governorate of Estonia and was invited to Budapest to advise in city development. In 1912, a brochure written by Saarinen about the planning problems of Budapest was published. He was runner up behind Walter Burley Griffin in an international competition to design the new Australian capital city of Canberra in 1912, but the following year he received the first place award in an international competition for his plan of the city of Reval, now known as Tallinn. From 1917 to 1918 Saarinen worked on the city-plan for greater Helsinki. He also designed a series of postage stamps issued 1917 and the Finnish markka banknotes introduced in 1922.

After the divorce from his first wife, Mathilde (who then married Herman Gesellius), on March 6, 1904, Saarinen married his second wife, Louise (Loja) Gesellius, a sculptor in Helsinki, and the younger sister of Herman Gesellius. They had a daughter Eva-Lisa (Pipsan) on March 31, 1905, and a son Eero on August 20, 1910.

== Move to the United States ==
Eliel Saarinen moved to the United States in 1923 after his competition entry for the Tribune Tower in Chicago, Illinois, won second place. While it was not built, the streamlined design inspired the architecture of many other skyscrapers. Saarinen first settled in Evanston, Illinois, where he worked on his scheme for the development of the Chicago lake front. In 1924 he became a visiting professor at the University of Michigan.

In 1925 George Gough Booth asked him to design the campus of Cranbrook Educational Community, intended to be an American equivalent to the Bauhaus. Saarinen taught there and became president of the Cranbrook Academy of Art in 1932. Among his student-collaborators were Ray Eames (then Ray Kaiser) and Charles Eames; Saarinen influenced their subsequent furniture design.

During 1929–34, Saarinen contributed product designs for the Wilcox Silver Plate Co. / International Silver Company in Meriden, Connecticut. His iconic tea urn (c. 1934) was first exhibited in 1934–35 at the Metropolitan Museum of Art in New York. Over the years, the tea urn has been widely exhibited, including in St. Louis Modern (2015–16) at the St Louis Art Museum, Cranbrook Goes to the Movies: Films and Their Objects, 1925–1975 at the Cranbrook Art Museum (2014–15), and in 2005–07, in the touring exhibition Modernism in American Silver: 20th-Century Design, organized by the Dallas Museum of Art, which also traveled to the Smithsonian Institution in Washington, DC. In 1951–52, the tea urn was featured in the Eliel Saarinen Memorial Exhibition which traveled to multiple venues across the United States. In addition to Cranbrook, the Dallas Museum and the St Louis Museum, The British Museum in London and the Metropolitan Museum of Art also hold tea urn-related Eliel Saarinen designs.

His son, Eero Saarinen (1910–1961), became one of the most important American architects of the mid-20th century as one of the leaders of the International and Neo-futurist styles. Saarinen's student Edmund N. Bacon achieved national prominence as Executive Director of the Philadelphia City Planning Commission from 1949 to 1970.

Eliel Saarinen received the AIA Gold Medal in 1947.

== Significant works ==
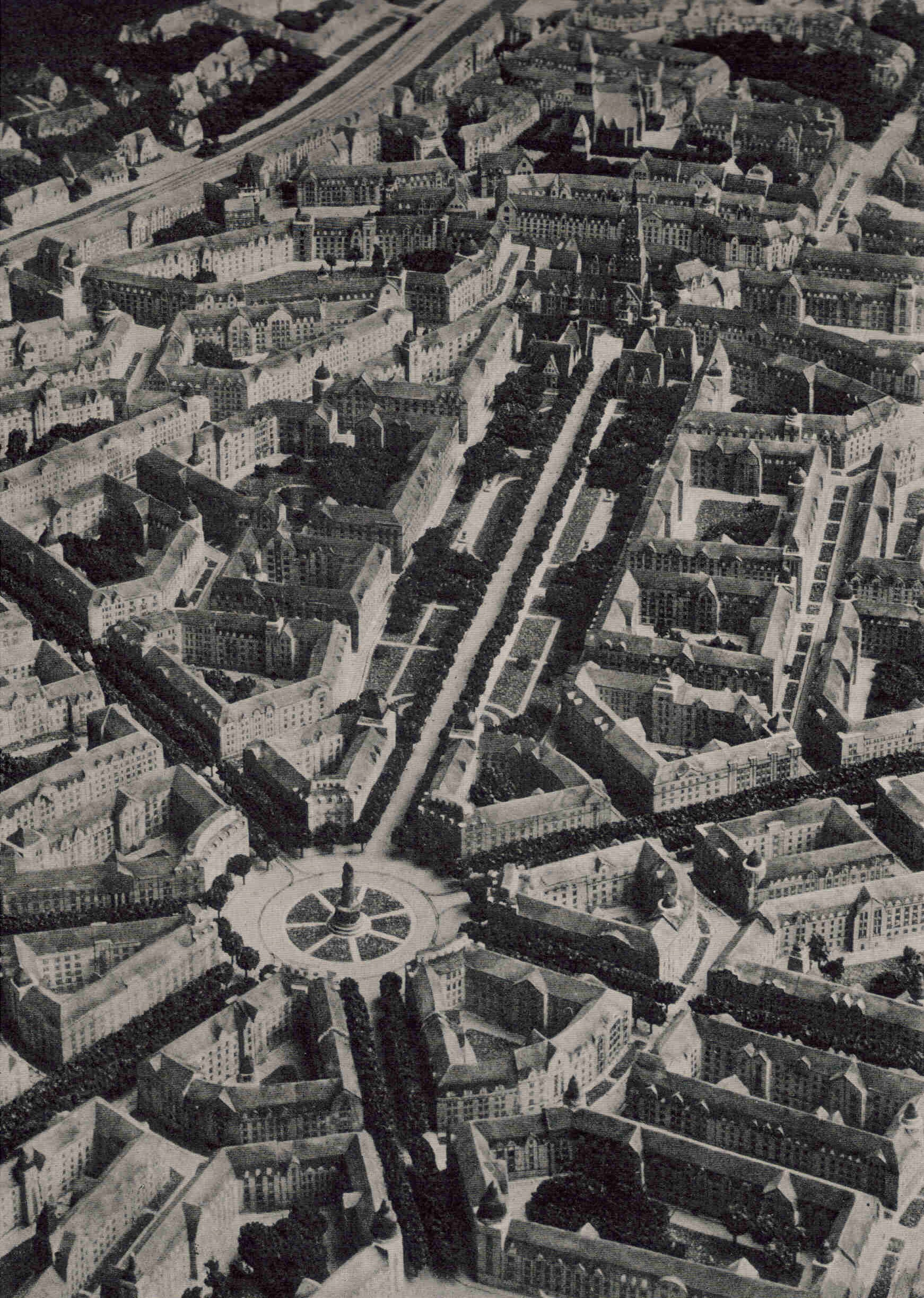
Saarinen designed entire city districts of Helsinki, but they were never built due to cost. This picture shows his plan for the Haaga district.

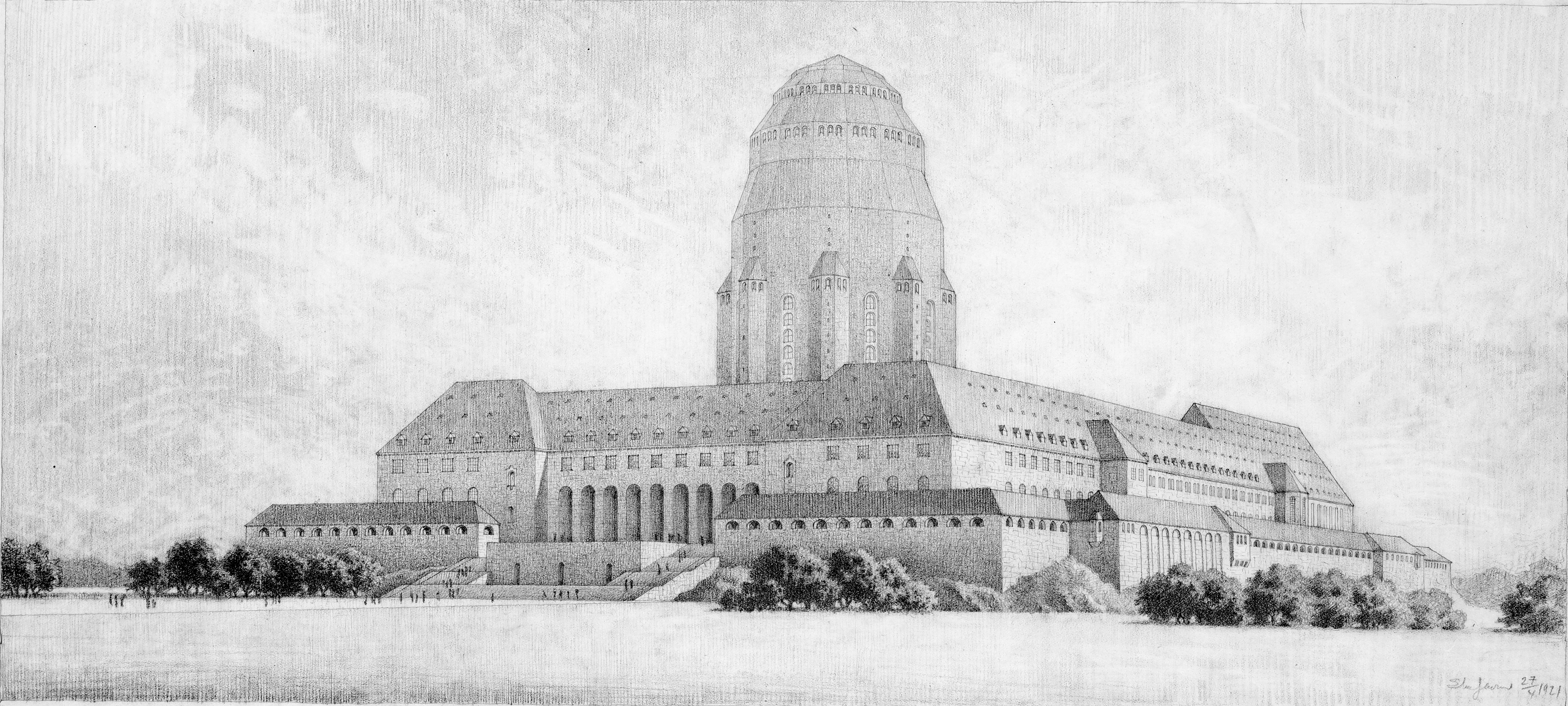
Illustration of the Kalevala House, an unbuilt building designed by Saarinen.

Work	Location	Finished	Picture
Finnish Pavilion at the Exposition Universelle (designed with Herman Gesellius and Armas Lindgren)	Paris	1900	
Hvitträsk	Kirkkonummi	1902	
National Museum of Finland	Helsinki	1904	
Luther Factory Workers' Canteen and People's House (designed with Herman Gesellius and Armas Lindgren)	Tallinn	1905	
Helsinki Central railway station	Helsinki	1909	
Lahti Town Hall	Lahti	1911	
Former Credit Bank Headquarters ("Saarinen House")	Tallinn	1912	
Villa Winter	Sortavala	1912	
Vyborg railway station	Vyborg	1913	
Joensuu Town Hall	Joensuu	1914	
Saint Paul's Church	Tartu	1917	
Marble Palace	Helsinki	1918	
Munkkiniemi Pension house	Helsinki	1920	
Cranbrook Educational Community	Bloomfield Hills	1924–1942	
Koussevitzky Music Shed	Lenox	1938	
Kleinhans Music Hall	Buffalo	1940	
Crow Island School	Winnetka	1940–41	
First Christian Church	Columbus, IN	1942	
Des Moines Art Center	Des Moines	1948	
Christ Church Lutheran	Minneapolis	1949	

== See also ==
- Eliel Square
- Saarinen Tower
