= Mob Boss (film) =

- VHS cover
- Directed by: Fred Olen Ray
- Screenplay by: T. L. Lankford
- Produced by: Mark Amin; Jeffrey B. Mallian; Fred Olen Ray; Grant Austin Waldman
- Starring: Eddie Deezen; Morgan Fairchild; William Hickey; Irwin Keyes
- Cinematography: Gary Graver
- Edited by: Christopher Roth
- Music by: Chuck Cirino
- Production company: American Independent Pictures
- Distributed by: Vidmark Entertainment
- Release date: September 16, 1990
- Running time: 93 minutes
- Country: United States
- Language: English

Mob Boss is a 1990 direct-to-video Mafia-themed comedy film directed by Fred Olen Ray and starring Eddie Deezen, Morgan Fairchild, Teagan Clive and William Hickey.

The film features character actor Deezen in one of his few leading roles, as well as guest appearances from many veteran character actors known for their "tough guy" and gangster roles, including Mike Mazurki in his final screen appearance.

== Plot summary ==
Don Anthony is the head of California's largest crime family. Unbeknownst to him, his voluptuous mistress Gina and his arch-rival Don Francisco have plotted a hostile takeover of the business, and Don Anthony is gunned down following a mob meeting. Lying mortally wounded in the hospital, Don Anthony directs his chief lieutenant Monk to locate his estranged son Tony to assume the family business and carry on the Anthony name.

Unfortunately for the family, Tony is a wimpy nerd with no idea of the true nature of his father's business. As Monk tries to transform the milquetoast geek into a fearsome gangster, Don Francisco attempts to overthrow him through Gina's powers of seduction, while a pair of bumbling hitmen try to bump Tony off at every turn.

== Cast ==
- Eddie Deezen as Tony Anthony
- William Hickey as Don Anthony
- Morgan Fairchild as Gina
- Stuart Whitman as Don Francisco
- Jack O'Halloran as Angelo
- Irwin Keyes as Monk
- Don Stroud as Legrand
- Joe Zimmerman as Dino
- Brinke Stevens as Sara
- Dick Miller as Mike
- Mike Mazurki as Don Taglianeti
- Len Lesser as Don Caglianoti
- Vince Barbi as Don Rigatoni
- Leo Gordon as Don O'Reily
- Jay Richardson as Tom Peck
- Robert Quarry as Dr. Jones (credited as Darius Beiderbeck)

== Production ==
The film starred Eddie Deezen who had previously worked with Fred Olen Ray on Beverly Hills Vamp. "I love Fred," said Deezen said the film was "so much fun to shoot. I had a ball. Morgan Fairchild, a lovely lady."

== Reception ==
Professional reviews of Mob Boss were moderately negative. Entertainment Weekly gave the film a "C−" rating, writing "This mostly rotten comedy from bad-movie king Fred Olen Ray (Hollywood Chainsaw Hookers) offers amazingly low-brow slapstick, but the cast has fun (especially Morgan Fairchild, of all people) and the liberal use of boingy sound effects makes for a few silly laughs". Allmovie gave the film 1.5 out of 5 stars without a written review.
