= Brigitte Burdine =

American voice-casting director

- Born: Brigitte Elaine Burdine; August 8, 1962; Takoma Park, Maryland, U.S.
- Died: December 29, 2010 (aged 48); Marina Del Rey, California, U.S.
- Occupations: Actress, model, film director, casting director
- Years active: 1983–2010

Brigitte Elaine Burdine (August 8, 1962 – December 29, 2010) was an American voice-casting director and actress, known for The New Mike Hammer, Justice League Heroes and Narc. She died on December 29, 2010, in a Marina del Rey hospital, California, USA. She also worked on several video games including World of Warcraft: Wrath of the Lich King. She was the head director of SOCOM: U.S. Navy SEALs: Confrontation, having worked on other titles of the same series.

== Early life ==
Brigitte Burdine was born on August 8, 1962, in Takoma Park, Maryland to Eugene and Judith Burdine, one of five children born to the couple. She attended Montgomery Blair High School in Silver Spring, Maryland and graduated from Northwood High School in Silver Spring, Maryland. After graduation in 1980 she moved to southern California for her acting/modeling career.

== Career ==
Brigitte Burdine was involved with casting for video games from as early as 1999, eventually she became a casting director for many high-profile titles. She collaborated with many others, including: Christopher Corey Smith, Fred Tatasciore, and André Sogliuzzo. Brigitte received 59 credits over a total of 31 game titles.

Brigitte appeared as Molly in Beverly Hills Vamp in 1989.

| Title | Year | Console | Role |
Design Credits
| X2: Wolverine's Revenge | 2003 | GameCube | Voice Direction |
Video/Cinematic Credits
| Enter the Matrix | 2003 | Xbox | Casting Coordinator |
| Enter the Matrix | 2003 | GameCube | Casting Coordinator |
| Enter the Matrix | 2003 | PlayStation 2 | Casting Coordinator |
| God of War II | 2007 | PlayStation 2 | Motion Capture Performer Casting By |
| Jet Li: Rise to Honor | 2004 | PlayStation 2 | Casting and Production Blindlight |
| Killzone: Liberation | 2006 | PSP | BB Casting |
| The Ant Bully | 2006 | PlayStation 2 | VO Casting (BB Casting & Production Services Inc.) |
| X2: Wolverine's Revenge | 2003 | GameCube | Casting |
| Yellow Rock | 2011 | Movie | Casting |
Audio Credits
| 300: March to Glory | 2007 | PSP | Casting and Recording Director |
| Black & Bruised | 2003 | PlayStation 2 | Voice Casting |
| Crimson Skies: High Road to Revenge | 2003 | Xbox | Casting Coordinator (Blindlight) |
| CSI: Dark Motives | 2004 | Windows | Session Director |
| Darkwatch | 2005 | PlayStation 2 | Casting |
| Darkwatch | 2005 | Xbox | Casting |
| Enter the Matrix | 2003 | Windows | Casting Coordinator |
| Freedom Fighters | 2003 | GameCube | Voice actors |
| Freedom Fighters | 2003 | PlayStation 2 | Voice actors |
| Freedom Fighters | 2003 | Windows | Voice actors |
| Freedom Fighters | 2003 | Xbox | Voice actors |
| Happy Feet | 2006 | Game Boy Advance | VO Director and Casting |
| Happy Feet | 2006 | PlayStation 2 | Adult Penguins |
| Justice League Heroes | 2006 | PlayStation 2 | Screaming Hands; VO Casting/Directing |
| Justice League Heroes | 2006 | PSP | Screaming Hands; VO Casting/Directing |
| Justice League Heroes | 2006 | Xbox | Screaming Hands; VO Casting/Directing |
| ModNation Racers | 2010 | PlayStation 3 | Casting Director |
| Mortal Kombat | 2011 | PlayStation 3 | Voice Over Casting |
| NARC | 2005 | Xbox | Casting Director, Cast (US) (as Civilian) |
| Spider-Man 2: Enter Electro | 2001 | PlayStation | In Charge |
| Spider-Man | 2000 | Nintendo 64 | Voice Casting |
| Spider-Man | 2000 | PlayStation | Voice Casting |
| Spider-Man | 2000 | Dreamcast | Voice Casting |
| Spider-Man | 2000 | Windows | Voice Casting |
| StarCraft II: Wings of Liberty | 2010 | Windows | Additional Casting Assistance |
| Tales of Symphonia | 2003 | GameCube | VO Director |
| The Ant Bully | 2006 | PlayStation 2 | VO Director (BB Casting & Production Services Inc.) |
| The Ant Bully | 2006 | Windows | VO Director (BB Casting & Production Services Inc.) |
| Twisted Metal | 2012 | PlayStation 3 | Casting |
| World of Warcraft: Cataclysm | 2010 | Windows | Additional Casting Assistance (Los Angeles); Casting Director |
| World of Warcraft: Wrath of the Lich King | 2008 | Windows | Casting Director |
| X2: Wolverine's Revenge | 2003 | PlayStation 2 | Casting, Voice Direction |
| X2: Wolverine's Revenge | 2003 | Windows | Casting, Voice Direction |
| X2: Wolverine's Revenge | 2003 | Xbox | Casting, Voice Direction |
| Xenosaga: Episode II – Jenseits von Gut und Böse | 2004 | PlayStation 2 | Voice Director |
| X-Men: Mutant Academy 2 | 2001 | PlayStation | Casting Director—Session 3 |
Thanks Credits
| The Grim Adventures of Billy & Mandy | 2006 | PlayStation 2 | Special Thanks |
| Xenosaga: Episode II – Jenseits von Gut und Böse | 2004 | PlayStation 2 | Special Thanks |
Other Credits
| Casper: Spirit Dimensions | 2001 | PlayStation 2 | Voice Casting |
| Ghosthunter | 2003 | PlayStation 2 | US Casting Director |
| Happy Feet | 2006 | PlayStation 2 | BB Casting & Production Services, Inc |
Company Credits
| Fatal Frame II: Crimson Butterfly | 2003 | PlayStation 2 | Voiceover Production – Blindlight |

== Death ==
Brigitte suffered severe head trauma in a reported hit and run incident in while walking home late at night along Culver Boulevard in Playa Vista, California on December 29, 2010. She later died at a Marina Del Rey hospital.
