= Exploratorium (film) =

1974 film

- Produced by: Jon Boorstin
- Cinematography: Eric Saarinen
- Distributed by: Exploratorium
- Release date: 1974
- Country: United States
- Language: English

Exploratorium is a 1974 American short documentary film about the Exploratorium science museum in San Francisco, produced by Jon Boorstin. The film explores the museum through imagery and sound, without voice-over. It was nominated for an Academy Award for Best Documentary Short Subject. The film was preserved by the Academy Film Archive in 2013.

== See also ==
- List of American films of 1974
