= Eero Saarinen =

American architect (1910–1961)

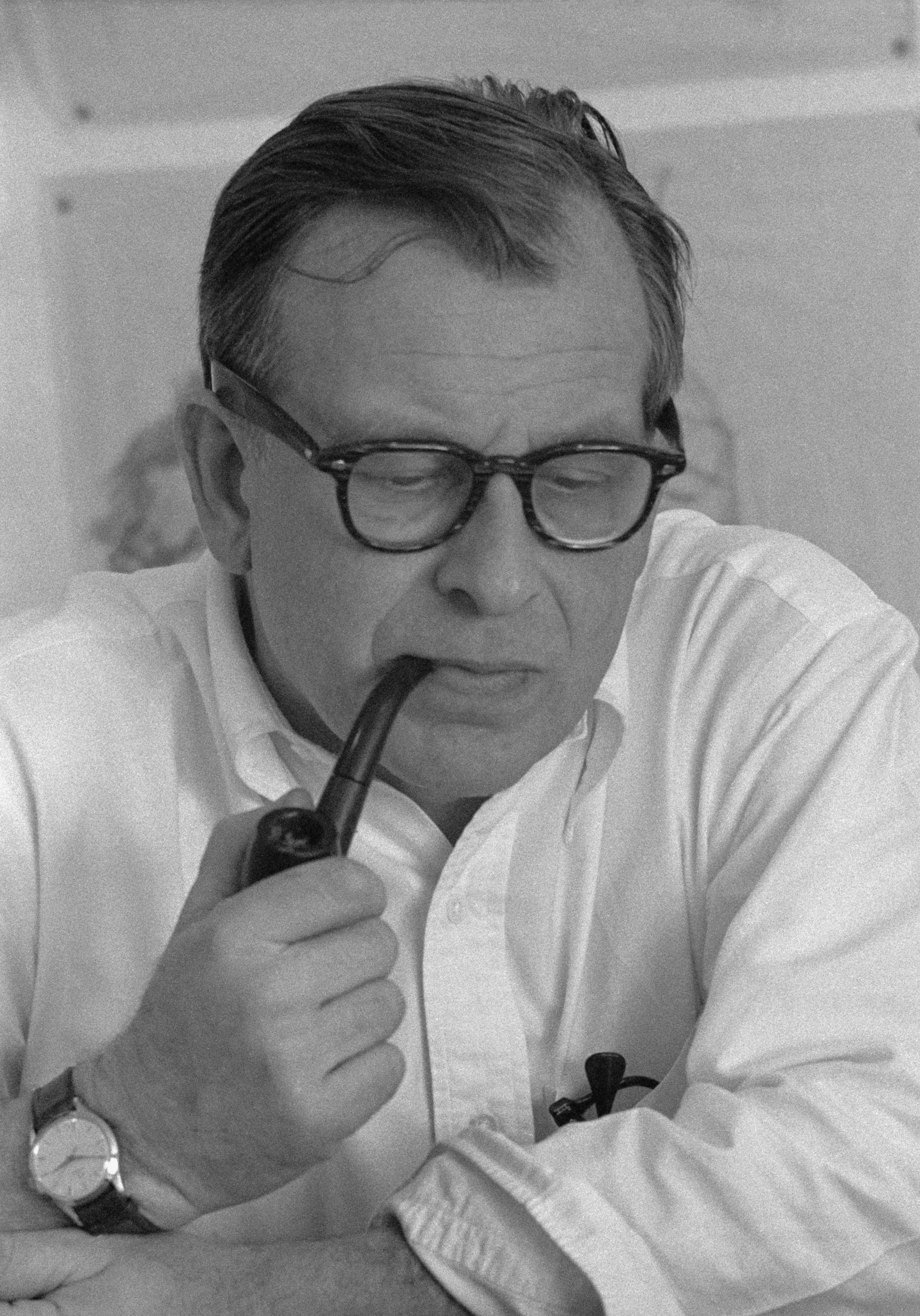
- Saarinen in 1955 or 1956
- Born: August 20, 1910; Kirkkonummi, Finland
- Died: September 1, 1961 (aged 51); Ann Arbor, Michigan, U.S.
- Education: Académie de la Grande Chaumière; Yale University
- Occupation: Architect
- Awards: AIA Gold Medal (1962)
- Practice: Associated architectural firm[s]
- Buildings: See list of works
- Design: Gateway Arch; General Motors Technical Center; Dulles International Airport Main Terminal; TWA Flight Center; Tulip chair
- Spouses: Lilian Swann (m. 1939; div. 1954) Aline Bernstein (m. 1954)
- Children: 3, including Eric Saarinen
- Parent(s): Eliel Saarinen; Loja Gesellius
- Relatives: Pipsan Saarinen Swanson (sister)

Eero Saarinen (/ˈeɪroʊ ˈsɑːrɪnən, ˈɛəroʊ -/, Finnish: [ˈeːro ˈsɑːrinen]; August 20, 1910 – September 1, 1961) was a Finnish-American architect and industrial designer. Saarinen's work includes the General Motors Technical Center, the Dulles International Airport Main Terminal, the TWA Flight Center at John F. Kennedy International Airport, the Vivian Beaumont Theater at Lincoln Center, the Gateway Arch, and the IBM Thomas J. Watson Research Center. During his career, Saarinen was elected a Fellow of the American Institute of Architects and served on the National Institute of Arts and Letters.

Born in Hvitträsk, Finland, he was the son of Finnish architect Eliel Saarinen, and immigrated to the United States as a teenager. Saarinen grew up in Bloomfield Hills, Michigan, studying at the Cranbrook Academy of Art, where his father taught. Saarinen became a naturalized citizen of the United States in 1940, a year after marrying the sculptor Lilian Swann, with whom he had two children. After divorcing Swann in 1954, Saarinen married Aline Bernstein Louchheim. In 1961, Saarinen died while undergoing an operation for a brain tumor.

== Early life and education ==
Eero Saarinen was born in Hvitträsk, Finland (then an autonomous state in the Russian Empire), on August 20, 1910, to Finnish architect Eliel Saarinen and his second wife, Louise, on his father's 37th birthday. They migrated to the United States in 1923, when Eero was thirteen. He grew up in Bloomfield Hills, Michigan, where his father taught and was dean of the Cranbrook Academy of Art, and he took courses in sculpture and furniture design there. He had a close relationship with fellow students, designers Charles and Ray Eames, and became good friends with architect Florence Knoll (née Schust).

Saarinen began studies in sculpture at the Académie de la Grande Chaumière in Paris, France, in September 1929. He then went on to study at the Yale School of Architecture, completing his studies in 1934. He subsequently toured Europe and North Africa for two years, as well as working for a time (1935-36) in Helsinki in the office of architect Jarl Eklund: Eliel Saarinen had received the commission for the remodelling and extension of the Swedish Theatre, and had chosen Eklund as his local representative, but in April 1935, after sending new drawings to Finland, he nominated his son to be the joint representative with Eklund in the construction work, completed in 1936. That same year, he returned to the United States to work in his father's architectural practice.

== Career ==
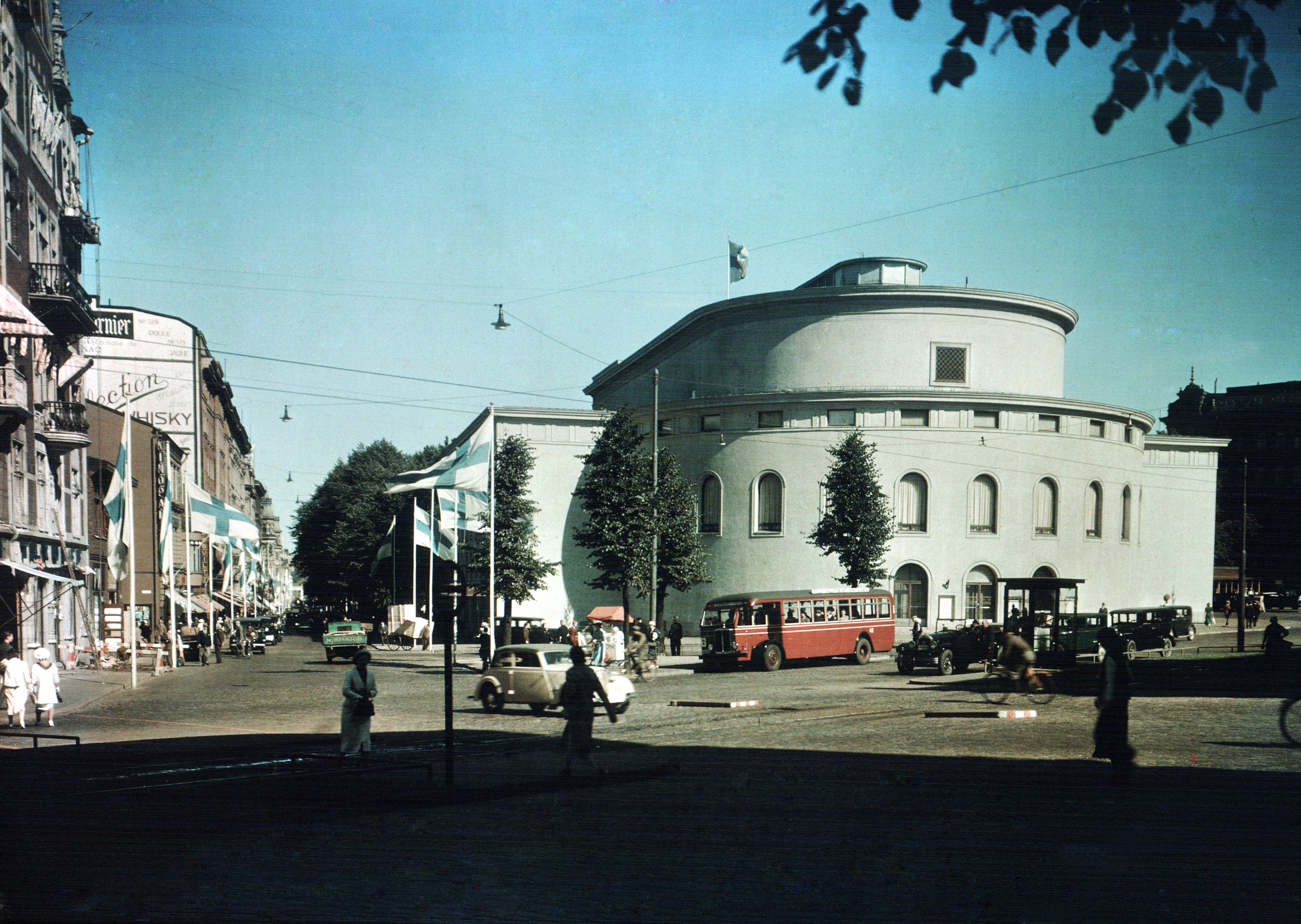
Swedish Theatre, Helsinki

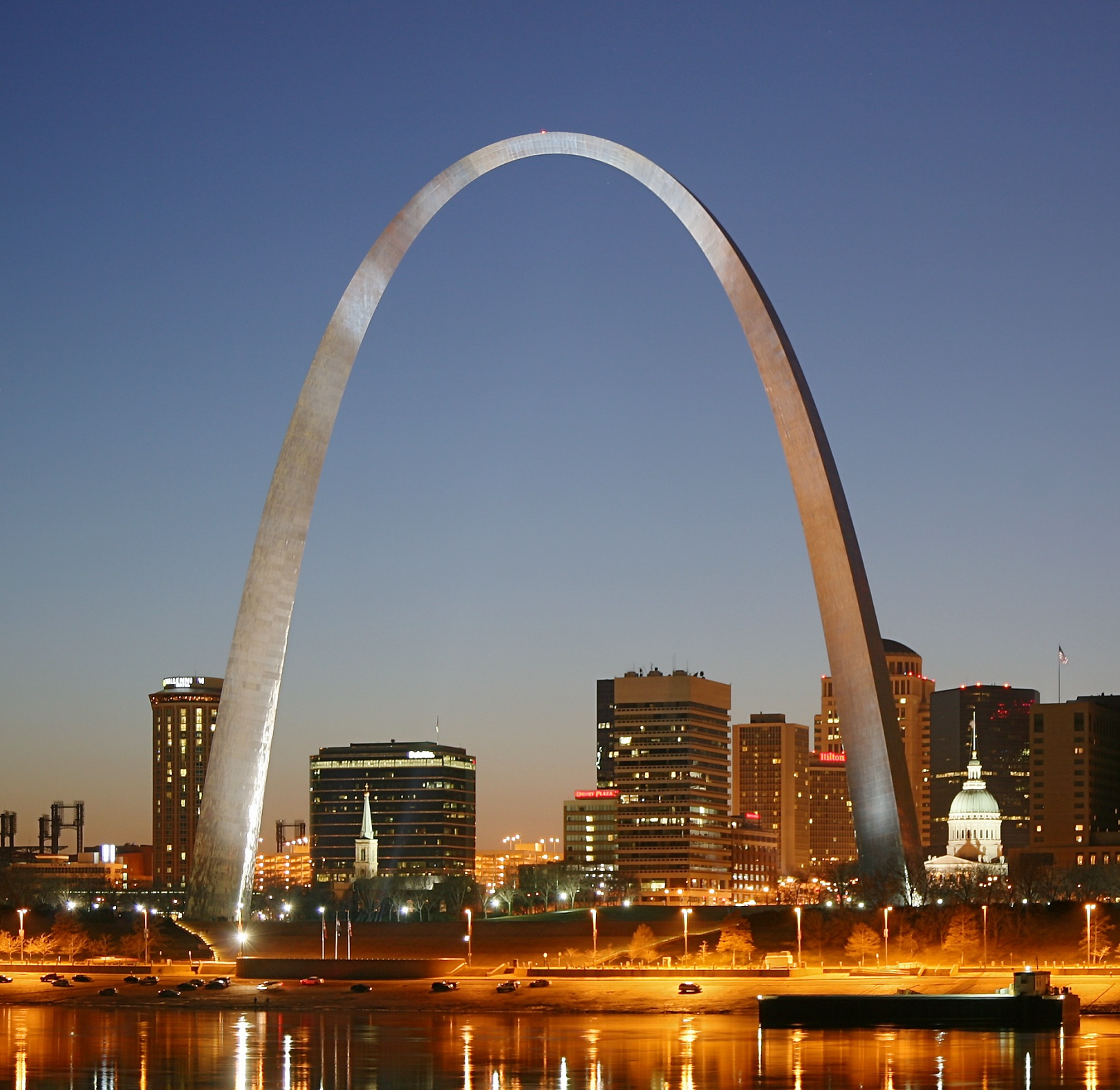
Gateway Arch in St. Louis

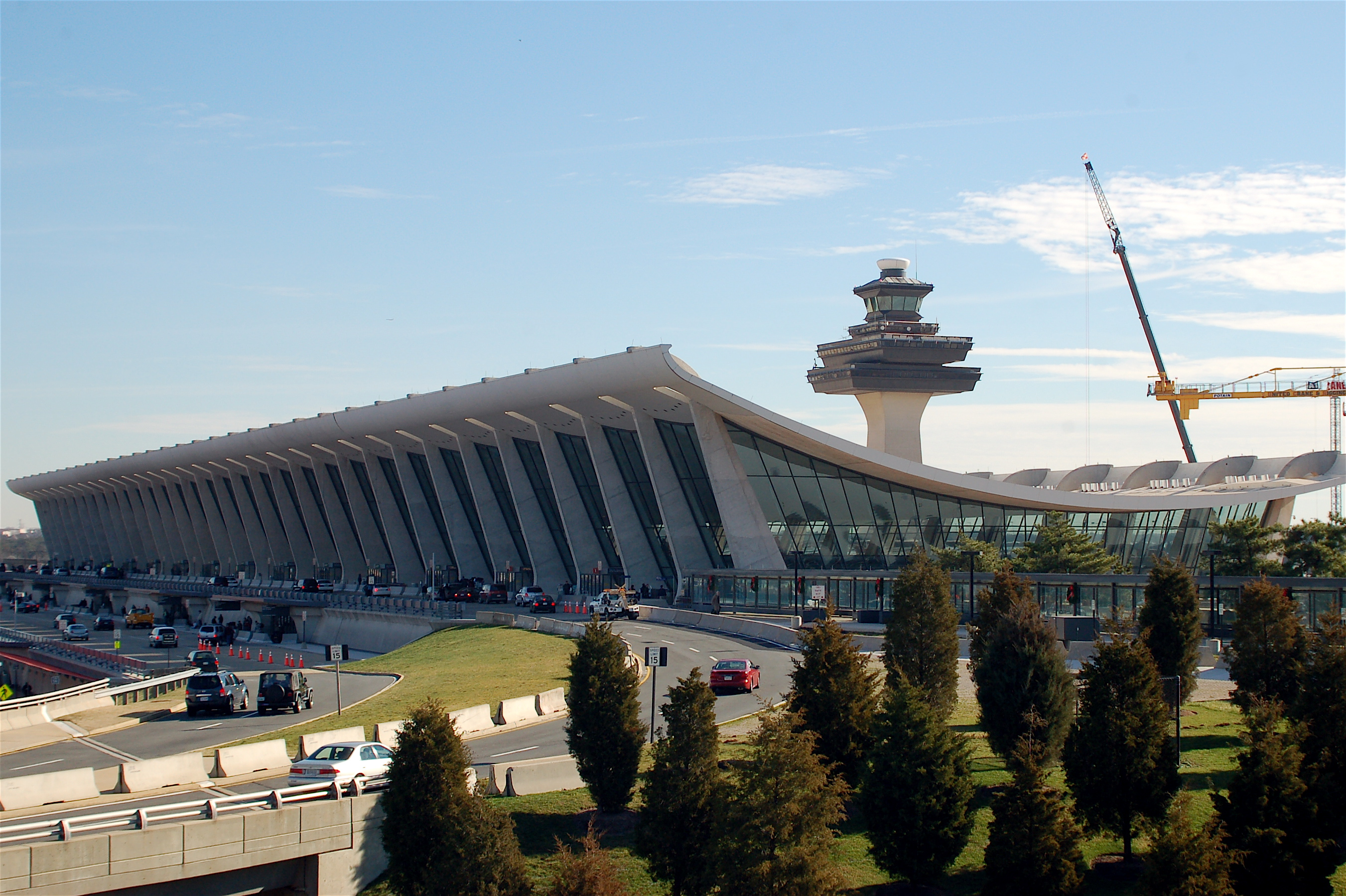
Dulles International Airport Main Terminal outside Washington, D.C.

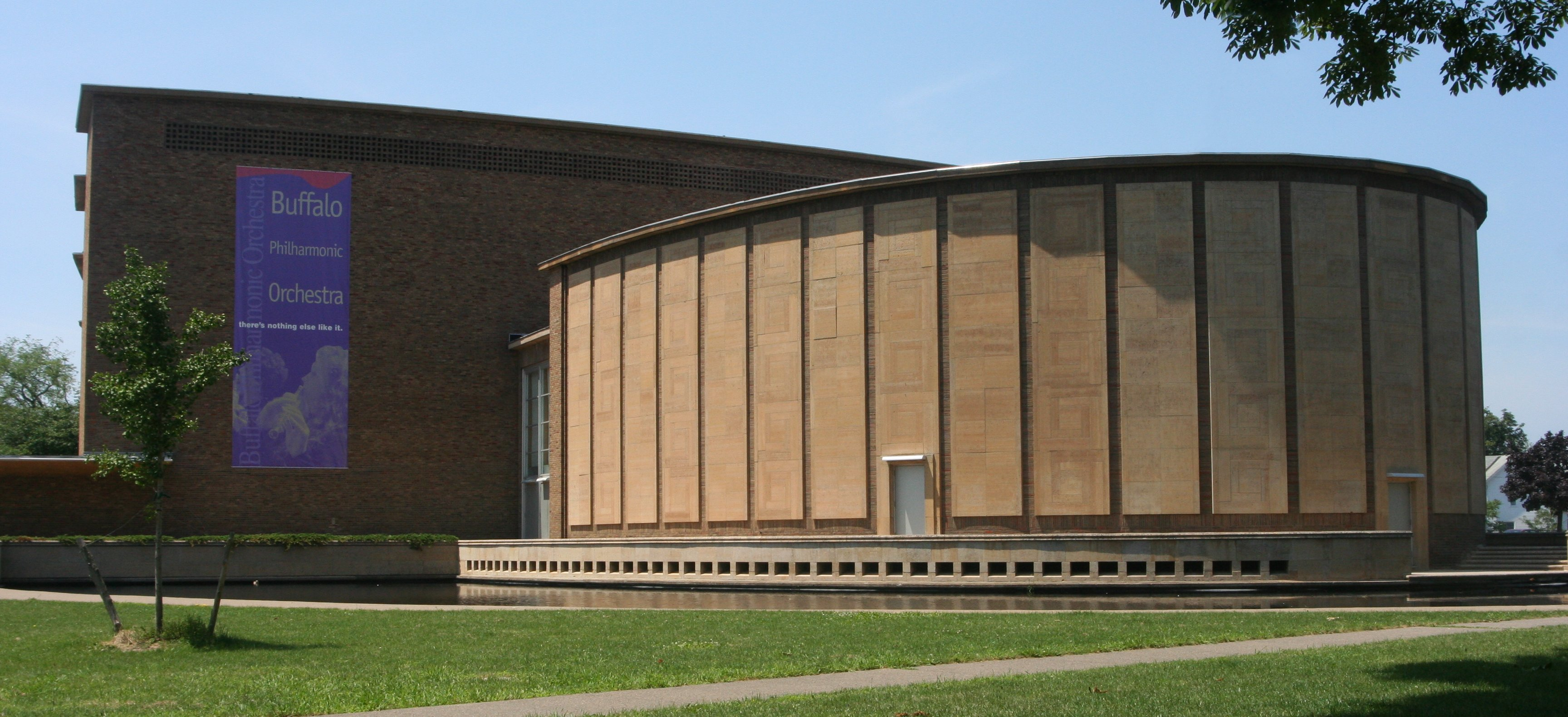
Kleinhans Music Hall in the Delaware Park–Front Park System

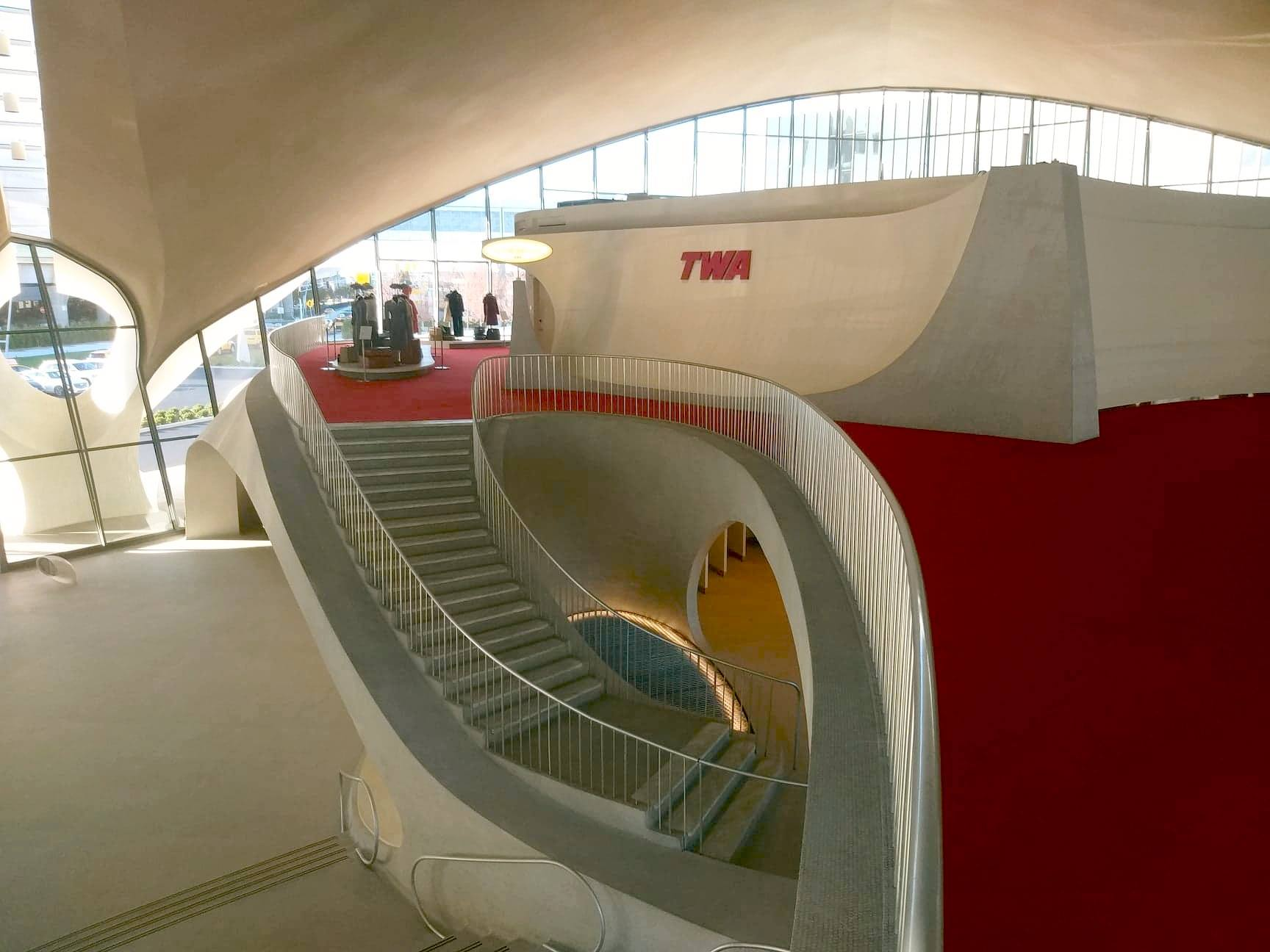
Fluid and open interior space, typical of Saarinen's style, is evident in the TWA Flight Center at John F. Kennedy International Airport.

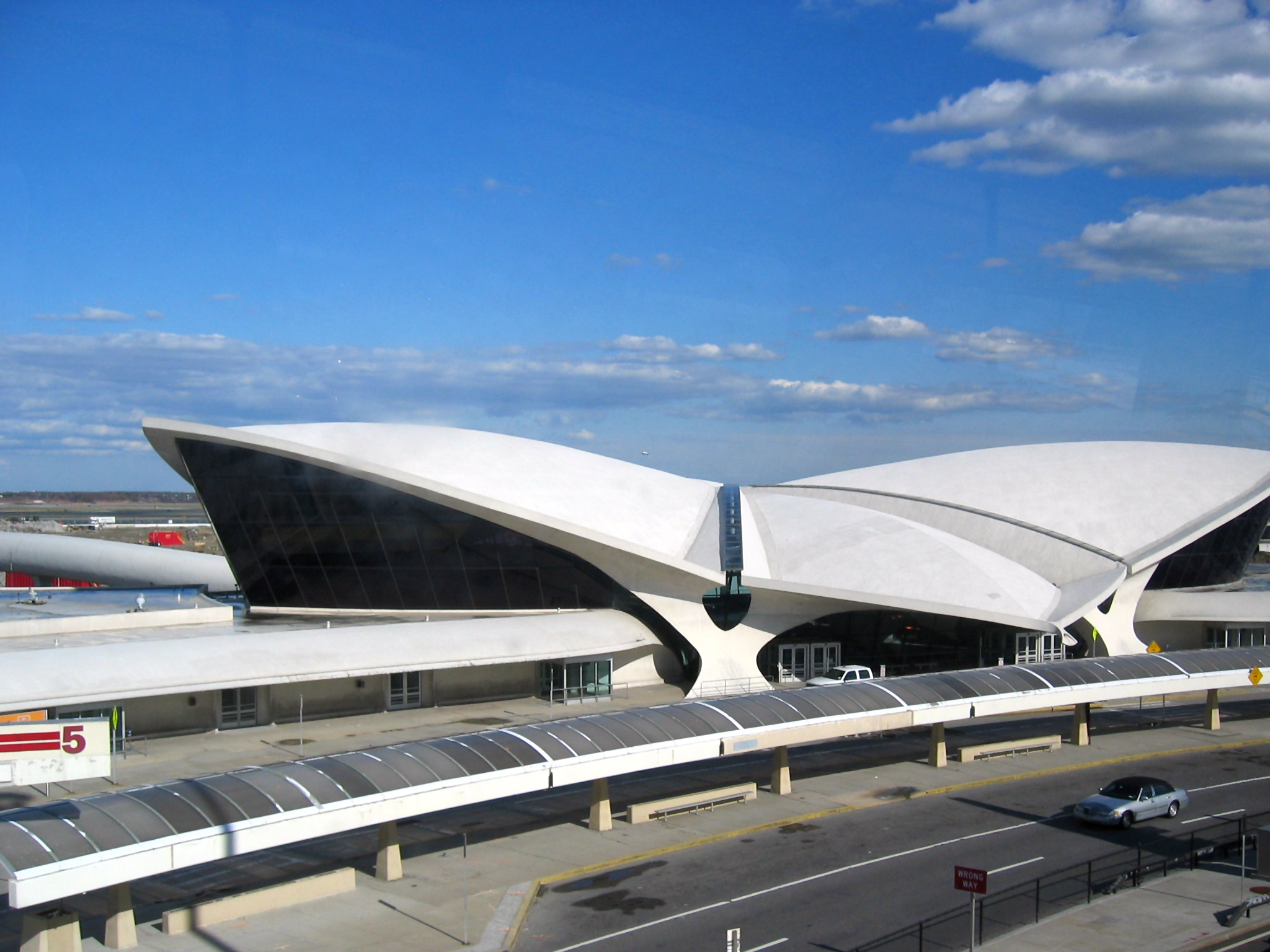
TWA Flight Center at JFK International Airport

After his tour of Europe and North Africa, Saarinen returned to Cranbrook to work for his father and teach at the academy. His father's firm, Saarinen, Swanson and Associates, was headed by Eliel Saarinen and Robert Swanson from the late 1930s until Eliel's death in 1950 and headquartered in Bloomfield Hills, Michigan, until 1961 when the practice was moved to Hamden, Connecticut.

While still working for his father, Saarinen first gained recognition for his design capabilities for a chair he designed together with Charles Eames, which received first place in the Organic Design in Home Furnishings competition in 1940. The Tulip chair, like all other Saarinen chairs, was taken into production by the Knoll furniture company, founded by Hans Knoll, who married Saarinen family friend Florence (Schust) Knoll. Further attention came also while Saarinen was still working for his father when he took first prize in the 1948 competition for the design of the Gateway Arch National Park (then known as the Jefferson National Expansion Memorial) in St. Louis. The memorial was not completed until the 1960s. The competition award was mistakenly addressed to his father because both he and his father had entered the competition separately.

During his long association with Knoll, he designed many important pieces of furniture, including the Grasshopper lounge chair and ottoman (1946), the Womb chair and ottoman (1948), the Womb settee (1950), side and arm chairs (1948–1950), and his most famous Tulip or Pedestal group (1956), which featured side and arm chairs, dining, coffee and side tables, as well as a stool. All of these designs were highly successful except for the Grasshopper lounge chair, which, although in production through 1965, was not a big success.

One of Saarinen's earliest works to receive international acclaim is the Crow Island School in Winnetka, Illinois (1940). The first major work by Saarinen, in collaboration with his father, was the General Motors Technical Center in Warren, Michigan, which follows the rationalist design Miesian style, incorporating steel and glass but with the addition of accent of panels in two shades of blue. The GM Technical Center was constructed in 1956, with Saarinen using models, which allowed him to share his ideas with others and gather input from other professionals.

With the success of this project, Saarinen was then invited by other major American corporations to design their new headquarters or other major corporate buildings, such as John Deere World Headquarters, IBM Watson/IBM Rochester, and CBS Building. Despite the overall rational design philosophy, the interiors usually contained dramatic sweeping staircases as well as furniture designed by Saarinen, such as the Pedestal series. In the 1950s, he began to receive more commissions from American universities for campus designs and individual buildings. These include Birch Hall at Antioch College, the Noyes dormitory at Vassar and Hill College House at the University of Pennsylvania as well as the Ingalls ice rink, Ezra Stiles and Morse Colleges at Yale University, Concordia Senior College in Fort Wayne, Indiana, the MIT Chapel and Kresge Auditorium at MIT, and the University of Chicago Law School building and grounds.

Saarinen served on the jury for the Sydney Opera House commission in 1957 and was crucial in the selection of the now internationally known design by Jørn Utzon. A jury which did not include Saarinen had discarded Utzon's design in the first round; Saarinen reviewed the discarded designs, recognized a quality in Utzon's design, and ultimately assured the commission of Utzon.

After his father's death in July 1950, Saarinen founded his own architect's office, Eero Saarinen and Associates. He was the principal partner from 1950 until his death. The firm carried out many of its most important works, including the Bell Labs Holmdel Complex in Holmdel Township, New Jersey; the Gateway Arch in St. Louis, Missouri; the Miller House in Columbus, Indiana; the TWA Flight Center at John F. Kennedy International Airport, which he worked on with Charles J. Parise; the Dulles International Airport Main Terminal; and the new East Air Terminal of the old Athens airport in Greece, which opened in 1967. Many of these projects use catenary curves in their structural designs.

In 1949 and 1950, Saarinen was hired by the then-new Brandeis University to create a master plan for the campus. Saarinen's plan A Foundation for Learning: Planning the Campus of Brandeis University (1949; second edition 1951), developed with Matthew Nowicki, called for a central academic complex surrounded by residential quadrangles along a peripheral road. The plan was never built but was useful in attracting donors. Saarinen did build a few residential structures on the campus, including Ridgewood Quadrangle (1950), Sherman Student Center (1952) and Shapiro Dormitory at Hamilton Quadrangle (1952). These have all been either demolished or extensively remodeled.

One of his best known thin-shell concrete structures is the Kresge Auditorium at MIT. Another thin-shell structure is Ingalls Rink at Yale University, which has suspension cables connected to a single concrete backbone and is nicknamed "the whale". His most famous work is the TWA Flight Center at John F. Kennedy International Airport, which represents the culmination of his previous designs and his genius for expressing the ultimate purpose of each building, what he called the "style for the job". In 2019, the terminal was transformed into the TWA Hotel and features furniture designed by Saarinen.

In 1960, Saarinen was hired to design the CBS Building in New York City. It was the only skyscraper he would ever design.

Saarinen designed the Kleinhans Music Hall in Buffalo, New York and its furnishings, together with his father, Eliel Saarinen. Since its opening in 1940, it has been hailed as one of the most acoustically perfect music halls in the world. He also designed the former Embassy of the United States in London, which opened in 1960, and the former Embassy of the United States in Oslo.

Saarinen worked with his father, mother, and sister designing elements of the Cranbrook campus in Bloomfield Hills, Michigan, including the Cranbrook School, Kingswood School, the Cranbrook Art Academy, and the Cranbrook Science Institute. Eero Saarinen's leaded-glass designs are a prominent feature of these buildings throughout the campus.

== Non-architectural activities ==
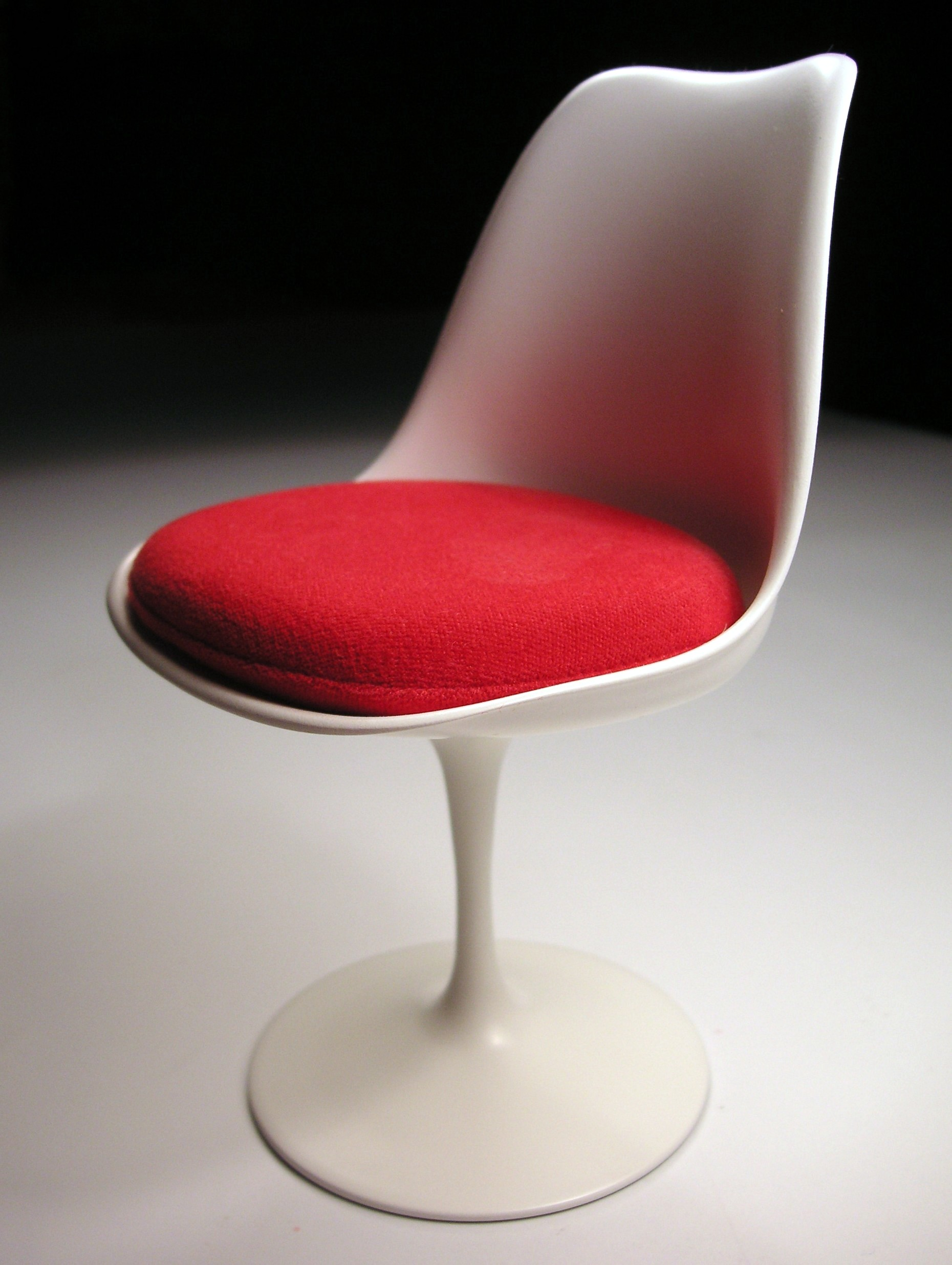
Saarinen's tulip chair and seat cushion designed in 1956, now housed in the Brooklyn Museum

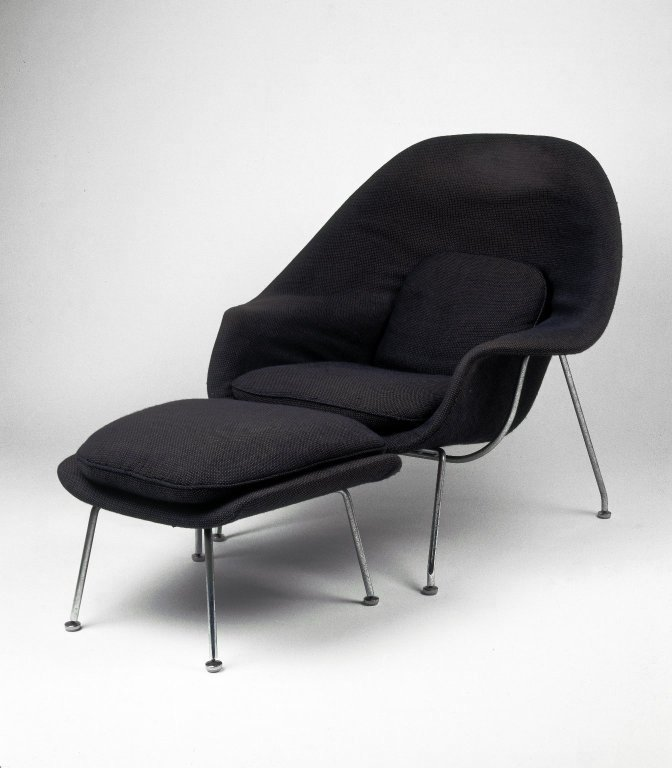
Womb Chair Model No. 70 designed 1947–1948, now in the Brooklyn Museum

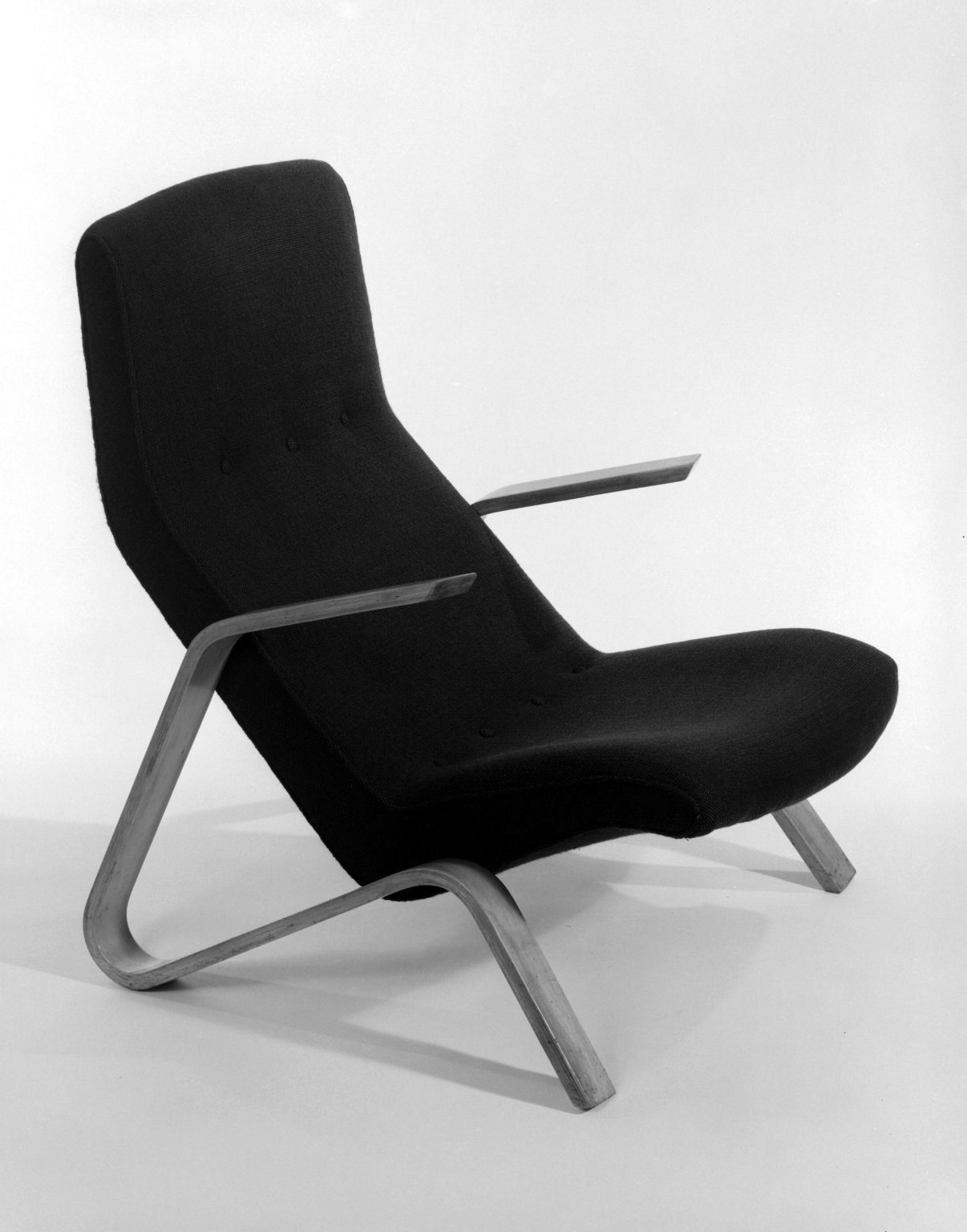
"Grasshopper" Highback Armchair designed c. 1947, now in the Brooklyn Museum

Saarinen was recruited by Donal McLaughlin, an architectural school friend from his Yale days, to join the military service in the Office of Strategic Services (OSS). Saarinen was assigned to draw illustrations for bomb disassembly manuals and to provide designs for the Situation Room in the White House. Saarinen worked full-time for the OSS until 1944.

== Honors and awards ==
Eero Saarinen was elected a Fellow of the American Institute of Architects in 1952. He was elected a member of the National Institute of Arts and Letters in 1954. In 1962, he was posthumously awarded a gold medal by the American Institute of Architects.

In 1940, he received two first prizes together with Charles Eames in the furniture design competition of the Museum of Modern Art in New York City. In 1948, he won the first prize in the Jefferson National Monument competition. The Boston Arts festival in 1953 gave him their Grand Architectural Award. He received the First Honor award of the American Institute of Architects twice, in 1955 and 1956, and their gold medal in 1962. In 1965 he took first prize in US Embassy competition in London.

== Personal life ==
Saarinen became a naturalized citizen of the United States in 1940.

In 1939, Saarinen married the sculptor Lilian Swann. They had two children, Eric and Susan Saarinen. They divorced in 1954. That year, Saarinen married Aline Bernstein Louchheim, an art critic at The New York Times. Saarinen met Louchheim when she came to Detroit to interview him for his contributions to the recently completed General Motors Technical Center. Saarinen and Louchheim had one son together, whom they named Eames after Saarinen's collaborator Charles Eames. In addition to their respective contributions to architecture, design, and criticism, Eero and Aline Saarinen are remembered for their affectionate and detailed personal papers, held at the Archives of American Art.

== Death ==
Saarinen died on September 1, 1961, at the age of 51 while undergoing an operation in Ann Arbor, Michigan for a brain tumor. He was overseeing the completion of a new music building for the University of Michigan School of Music, Theatre & Dance.

== Legacy ==
By the 21st century, Saarinen was considered one of the masters of American 20th-century architecture. During that time, his work was the subject of a major exhibition and several books. This is partly because Roche-Dinkeloo, the successor to Saarinen's firm, donated its Saarinen archives to Yale University, but also because Saarinen's oeuvre can be said to fit in with present-day concerns about pluralism of styles. He was criticized in his own time—most vociferously by Yale's Vincent Scully—for having no identifiable style; one explanation for this is that Saarinen's vision was adapted to each individual client and project, which were never exactly the same. Scully also criticized him for designing buildings that were "packages", with "no connection with human use . . . at once cruelly inhuman and trivial, as if they had been designed by the Joint Chiefs of Staff."

The papers of Aline and Eero Saarinen, from 1906 to 1977, were donated in 1973 to the Archives of American Art, Smithsonian Institution (by Charles Alan, Aline Saarinen's brother and executor of her estate). In 2006, the bulk of these primary source documents on the couple were digitized and posted online on the Archives' website.

The Eero Saarinen collection at the Canadian Centre for Architecture documents eight built projects, including the old Athens airport in Greece, the former US Embassy Chanceries in Oslo, Norway and London, England, corporate projects for John Deere, CBS, and IBM, and the North Christian Church in Columbus, Indiana.

An exhibition of Saarinen's work, Eero Saarinen: Shaping the Future, was organized by the Finnish Cultural Institute in New York in collaboration with Yale School of Architecture, the National Building Museum, and the Museum of Finnish Architecture. The exhibition toured in Europe and the United States from 2006 to 2010, including a stint at the National Building Museum in Washington, DC. The exhibition was accompanied by the book Eero Saarinen: Shaping the Future.

In 2016, Eero Saarinen: The Architect Who Saw the Future, a film about Saarinen co-produced by his son Eric Saarinen, premiered on the American Masters series on PBS.

== See also ==
- List of works by Eero Saarinen

== Sources ==
- Saarinen, Eero (1962). Saarinen, Aline B. (ed.). Eero Saarinen on His Work: A Selection of Buildings Dating from 1947 to 1964 with Statements by the Architect. New Haven: Yale University Press.
- A&E (1997). America's Castles: Newspaper Moguls. New York: A&E Network. ASIN B000FKP26M. Archived from the original (television series episode) on December 28, 2016. Episode featuring the Cranbrook House and Gardens.
- Roman, Antonio (2003). Eero Saarinen: an architecture of multiplicity. New York: Princeton Architectural Press. ISBN 978-1-56898-340-0.
- Risen, Clay (November 7, 2004). "Saarinen rising: A Much-Maligned Modernist Finally Gets His Due". Boston.com. Archived from the original on December 8, 2004.
- Merkel, Jayne (2005). Eero Saarinen. London: Phaidon Press. ISBN 978-0-7148-4277-6.
- Pelkonen, Eeva-Liisa (2006). Eero Saarinen. New Haven: Yale University Press. ISBN 978-0-300-11282-5.
- Serraino, Pierluigi (2006). Saarinen, 1910–1961: a Structural Expressionist. Köln: Taschen. ISBN 978-3-8228-3645-3.
- Knight, Richard (2008). Saarinen's Quest, A Memoir. San Francisco: William Stout Publishers. ISBN 978-0-9746214-4-9.
- Santala, Susanna (2015). Laboratory for a New Architecture: Airport Terminal, Eero Saarinen and the Historiography of Modern Architecture (Ph.D. thesis). Helsinki: University of Helsinki. ISBN 978-951-51-0993-4.
