= Starhops =

- Starhops poster
- Directed by: Barbara Peeters
- Written by: Stephanie Rothman (as "Dallas Meredith")
- Produced by: Robert D. Kritzman; John B Kelley executive Daniel Grodnick; Robert Sharpe co-executive Jack Rose
- Cinematography: Eric Saarinen
- Edited by: Steve Zaillian
- Production company: Roseworld Films
- Distributed by: First American Films
- Release date: 23 November 1977
- Country: USA
- Language: English
- Budget: $450,000

Starhops is 1977 exploitation comedy film directed by Barbara Peeters, based on a script by Stephanie Rothman, writing under a pseudonym, and was edited by future Oscar winning screenwriter Steve Zaillian.

Three carhops team up to save their cash-strapped Venice Beach drive-in restaurant from the clutches of a greedy oil baron who wants the land it sits on.

== Plot ==
Three girls - Danielle, Cupcake and Angel - work at a drive in restaurant in Venice owned by Jerry who is financially struggling. Jerry decides to quit and sells the restaurant to the three girls.

== Cast ==
- Dorothy Buhrman as Danielle
- Sterling Frazier as Cupcake
- Jillian Kesner as Angel
- Anthony Mannino as Kong
- Paul Ryan as Norman
- Al Hobson as Carter Axe
- Dick Miller as Jerry
- Peter Liapis as Ron

== Production ==
Rothman originally wrote the script, then entitled Carhops, while she was at Dimension Pictures. She took it with her when she left Dimension in 1975 and sold it to some producers, with whom she signed a contract to direct. Rothman says "They gave me a start date for the picture, but I never heard from them after that. Instead, one day I read in Daily Variety that Barbara Peeters had been hired to direct it. The reason given for replacing me was that old excuse “artistic differences.” I don't know how much, if anything, Barbara Peeters knew about this. All I know is the wanna-bes lacked the courage or decency to inform me personally of their decision."

Barbara Peeters had, like Rothman, made films for New World Pictures.

The drive-in was located on the northeast corner of Knox St. and N. Maclay Ave in the San Fernando Valley. The Masonic Lodge with its distinctive white pillars and square sign is still across the street.

Rothman says she saw the finished film and asked for her name to be taken off the credits as she felt "there was not an idea, a scene, a word, or even a comma left from my original script." She took the pseudonym "Dallas Meredith", later specifying "Let me say it as plainly as I can: Starhops is not my fault."

Peeters called the film "camp. Just these girls running amok. It was stuff we [she and her friends] would have done, just crazy kind of stuff.”

The movie was retitled due to the fact there was another film released called The Carhops.

In a later interview, Rothman said "I was not very good at what is called networking. I really didn't know how to go about it. There was another woman who has had a career, a successful career, as a director, who was just getting started then and she was much better than I was at doing that." She may have been talking about Peeters.

Peeters had been diagnosed with terminal stage melanoma before filming and during the shoot was undergoing an experimental treatment program at UCLA. However, due to her experience and extensive planning the film was completed on budget. (Peeters' health later recovered.)

== Reception ==
The Los Angeles Times called it "a good natured, fast and funny Horatio Alger tale... Peeters makes you care about these no-nonsense working women. Peeter's direction exudes energy and displays style and skill in the handling of actors and action."

Filmink argued the movie "isn’t very good, incidentally – it’s hard to tell the three leads apart, it feels padded, lacks sexiness and social conscience; we’re not sure what happened, especially considering Summer School Teachers had been so much fun – maybe it was the absence of Julie Corman, or Peeters having health issues around this time."
