= The Fabulous Bastard from Chicago =

The Fabulous Bastard from Chicago (aka The Fabulous Kid from Chicago)
- Directed by: Greg Corarito
- Written by: Richard Compton
- Produced by: David F. Friedman
- Starring: John Alderman; James E. Myers; Maria Lease
- Cinematography: Gary Graver
- Edited by: Gary Graver
- Music by: Gregory Sainz
- Production company: Walnut Films
- Release date: June 1969
- Running time: 97 minutes
- Country: United States
- Language: English
- Budget: $37,000

The Fabulous Bastard from Chicago is a 1969 feature film directed by Greg Corarito and starring John Alderman, James E. Myers, Maria Lease. It was produced by David F. Friedman. It is a combination of gangster and sexploitation genres, inspired by the success of Bonnie and Clyde (1967).

== Premise ==
During Prohibition, playboy gangster Steve Desmond owns and operates a liquor distribution company in Chicago. Rival gangster Fats Percelli wants in on his operation, so Desmond sets out to seduce Percelli's daughter.

== Cast ==
- John Alderman as Steve Desmond
- James E. Myers as Carl 'Fats' Percelli
- Maria Lease as Nancy
- Dan Sonney as Joe the bartender
- Vicki Carbe as Maria
- Gary Kent as Wes
- Bambi Allen as Spinster O'Mally
- R. Michael Stringer as Skinner
- Duke Wilmoth as Tom
- Phil Marks as Wally
- Whitey Wozniak as Mr. Thad

== Production ==
The Fabulous Bastard from Chicago was partly filmed at the Spahn Ranch. Barbara Peeters worked on the film as costume designer.

== See also ==
- List of American films of 1969
