= Twisted Nightmare =

1987 film by Paul Hunt

- Theatrical poster
- Directed by: Paul Hunt
- Written by: Paul Hunt
- Produced by: Sandy Horowitz
- Starring: Rhonda Gray; Cleve Hall; Robert Padilla
- Cinematography: Gary Graver; Paul Hunt
- Edited by: Allen Persselin
- Music by: Bruce Wallenstein
- Production company: Trans World Entertainment
- Distributed by: United Filmmakers
- Release dates: September 14, 1988 (New York City); November 4, 1988 (Los Angeles)
- Running time: 94 minutes
- Country: United States
- Language: English

Twisted Nightmare is a 1988 American supernatural slasher film written and directed by Paul Hunt and starring Rhonda Gray, Cleve Hall, and Robert Padilla. Its plot follows a group of young people who return to a summer camp they attended in their youth, and are killed off by a hulking killer.

== Plot ==
Laura receives a letter notifying her she has won a free weekend trip to Camp Paradise, a summer camp she attended as a child. She and her new boyfriend, Shawn, arrive at the camp, and Laura is reunited with a group of her old friends. Among them are Jennifer, Laura, and Tak, and couples Nicole and Jerome, Gus and Sylvia, Ken and Julie, and Dean and Cheri. Laura is reluctant to be at the camp, as her developmentally disabled brother Matthew died there under mysterious circumstances two years prior. During the party, Sylvia and Gus are attacked and murdered in an outlying barn by a hulking, monstrous killer—Sylvia is hanged with a rope, while Gus has his arm torn off.

The next morning, Dean announces that he and Cheri are leaving, as he is suspicious of the "free weekend" letters they received. While the remaining others go for a hike, Ken and Julie remain at the main house. Ken goes to search for Kane, the Native American groundskeeper, to inquire about Matthew's death. Meanwhile, Julie finds Gus and Sylvia's bodies. She frantically phones the local sheriff, Elmer Goodes, but the phone disconnects, and she is killed outside. Meanwhile, while Tak and Shawn are hunting, Tak recounts Matthew's death: He explains how, two years ago, some of the group teased Matthew for allegedly being gay. Matthew entered the barn, where his body spontaneously combusted, after which he fled into the woods, engulfed in flames. His body was never recovered.

Back at the house, Ken returns and is unable to find Julie, but finds Kane in the barn, who threatens him with a shotgun. Ken flees, but gets caught on a bear trap in the woods before having his throat slashed by the killer. Jennifer and Laura return from hiking, and Laura begins cutting herself in the bathroom before taking a shower. Jennifer is trapped in the ice house by the killer, while, Nicole, Jeff, Gerome, and Nancy go to the camp sauna. As Nancy and Jeff have sex outside the sauna, the killer impales them with a pole before bludgeoning Nicole with a hammer, and Jerome with hot stones.

Kane finds Shawn and Tak in the woods, and implores them to leave. He explains that his grandfather, a medicine man, cursed the land after it was taken over by Anglo settlers, and that mysterious deaths have since occurred there, particularly in the barn. Shawn and Tak are subsequently confronted by the killer in the woods, and flee back to the main house. Tak frees Jennifer from the ice house, but is murdered by the killer. Jennifer manages to escape toward the barn. Meanwhile, as Sheriff Goodes drives toward the camp to investigate the call he received, he finds Dean and Cheri walking along a road. They explain that their car broke down. Goodes drives them back, and begins searching the property. Upon finding the bodies at the sauna, Goodes is decapitated. Back at the house, Dean searches for the others outside, armed with a rifle, but is confronted by the killer, who supernaturally electrifies the fence he is holding onto, electrocuting him to death. The killer subsequently impales Cheri on mounted deer antlers inside the house.

Outside the barn, Shawn witnesses Kane strangling Laura, and shoots him. After, Laura smiles and confesses that she orchestrated the reunion of the group to punish them for what they did to Matthew. Suddenly, a decayed and burned Matthew appears. Shawn attempts to kill him, but is unable to, and Matthew stabs Shawn to death with a pitchfork. Jennifer, who has observed the attack through the barn window, screams in horror. Kane knocks over several gasoline-filled barrels inside the barn before lighting a match, blowing up the barn with himself, Laura, and Matthew inside. Jennifer, the lone survivor, escapes in the sheriff's car. As Jennifer drives away, the flames engulfing the barn vanish and it is restored to its original form.

== Cast ==
- Rhonda Gray as Laura
- Cleve Hall as Matthew
- Robert Padilla as Kane
- Brad Bartram as Shawn
- Scott King as Ken
- Devon Jenkin as Julie
- Heather Sullivan as Cheri
- Kenneth Roper Jr. as Dean
- Natalie Main as Jennifer
- Darryl Tong as Tak
- Juliet Martin as Nicole
- Marc Copage as Gerome
- Crisstyn Dante as Nancy
- Jim Gosling as Jeff
- Phillip Bardowell as Gus
- Donna Correa as Sylvia
- Noble 'Kid' Chissell as Sheriff
- Stephanie Birnbaum as Granddaughter
- Jim Whitecloud as Thunder Fire

== Production ==
The screenplay for Twisted Nightmare was copyrighted under its working title, Ancient Evil, on July 1, 1987. The film's opening titles erroneously date the copyright as 1982; this contradicts the 1987 copyright at the film's end credits, as well as a March 6, 1987 listing in Variety. The film was shot by writer-director Paul Hunt and cinematographer Gary Graver, who had previously worked as a cinematographer for Orson Welles on The Other Side of the Wind.

== Release ==
Twisted Nightmare was released regionally in the United States on May 20, 1988, and later premiered in New York City on September 14, and in Los Angeles on November 4.

=== Home media ===
The film was released on VHS on March 29, 1989. It premiered on Blu-ray in May 2017 by Code Red.

== Critical reception ==
Upon the film's Los Angeles premiere, Chris Willman of the Los Angeles Times called the film "an absolutely bottom-of-the-barrel spookfest about a killer and some evil Indian spirits terrorizing fornicating young folks at a summer camp. Surely there's a more intriguing story behind how this sleepy slimeball of a horror film ever earned a theatrical release than there is in the senseless plot line itself".
