= Lilian Swann Saarinen =

American artist (1912–1995)

- Born: April 17, 1912; New York City, U.S.
- Died: May 22, 1995 (aged 83); Cohasset, Massachusetts, U.S.
- Education: Miss Chapin's School
- Alma mater: Art Students League of New York; Cranbrook Academy of Art
- Occupations: Sculptor, artist, writer
- Spouse: Eero Saarinen (m. 1939; div. 1954)
- Children: 2; including Eric Saarinen
- Relatives: Edie Sedgwick (cousin)

Lilian Louisa Swann Saarinen (April 17, 1912 – May 22, 1995) was an American sculptor, artist, and writer. She was the first wife of Finnish-American architect and industrial designer Eero Saarinen, with whom she sometimes collaborated.

== Early life ==
She was born in New York City to Dr. Arthur Wharton Swann and his wife Susan Ridley Sedgwick. Her father unexpectedly died in 1914, when Lily was aged two and her sister Lucy was four. She attended Miss Chapin's School in Manhattan, and spent her summers studying sculpture in Connecticut. She first seriously studied art at the Art Students League of New York with Alexander Archipenko, and later with Albert Stewart, Heinz Warneke, and Brenda Putnam. She moved to Michigan where she studied under Carl Milles at the Cranbrook Academy of Art.

During her teenage years, she spent her winters learning to ski with Otto Fürer in St. Anton am Arlberg in Austria. She was an alternate on the first U.S. Women's alpine ski team at the 1936 Winter Olympics.

=== Marriage ===
She met Eero Saarinen at Cranbrook Academy, where his father, architect Eliel Saarinen, was a faculty member. She married Eero on June 10, 1939, and they had two children: Eric Saarinen, born 1942, and Susan Saarinen, born 1945. They divorced in 1954, and she moved to Cambridge, Massachusetts.

== Career ==
She contributed illustrations to magazines such as Child Life, Interiors, and Portfolio: An Intercontinental Quarterly. In 1935 she illustrated a children's book for the Bronx Zoo, Picture Book Zoo. In 1946 she wrote and illustrated the children's book Who Am I?

Saarinen's early sculpture commissions included: 23 glazed terra cotta reliefs (most of animals) at the Crow Island School in Winnetka, Illinois, 1938, Eliel Saarinen, architect; reliefs at the U.S. post office in Carlisle, Kentucky; and a terra cotta relief, Waiting for the Mail (1941), at the U.S. post office in Bloomfield, Indiana (Missing as of 2016). She frequently supplied "ceramic embellishments" for her husband's architectural projects.

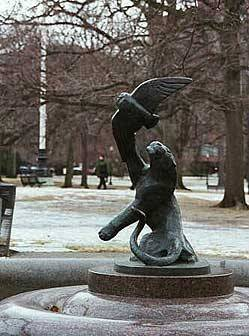
Bagheera Fountain at Boston Public Garden

She exhibited the sculpture Night (now called Bagheera) at the 1939 World's Fair. It illustrates a scene from Rudyard Kipling's The Jungle Book—the panther Bagheera hunting an owl by night. Placed in the Boston Public Garden in 1986, it is a feature of the Boston Women's Heritage Trail.

She was part of her husband's design team that won the 1947 national competition to design the Gateway Arch in St. Louis, Missouri at the Gateway Arch National Park. Her bas-relief panels of the Mississippi River were eliminated from the final design.

She specialized in animal portraits. Among these were the Royal Dutch Airlines sculpture at John F. Kennedy Airport in New York City; and Screaming Eagle (1951) at the Federal Reserve Bank Building Annex in Detroit, Michigan. The latter piece, designed at the request of architect Minoru Yamasaki, is an abstract American bald eagle constructed of welded brass rods. She created the Fountain of Noah (1954) at the Northland Center, a shopping mall in Southfield, Michigan; interior sculpture at the Toffenetti Restaurant in Chicago, Illinois; and a mural of Boston Harbor with glazed terra cotta reliefs of sea creatures (1960s) at the Harbor National Bank on Franklin Street in Boston, Massachusetts. In later years, she modeled a number of portrait heads, among them that of her friend Gardner Cox (1967).

In 1945, as part of the Red Cross Arts and Skills Unit rehabilitation program, she taught returning soldiers to model and fire ceramic sculpture. Later she taught at the Pratt Institute in Brooklyn, New York City; the Museum of Fine Arts School in Boston; and the Massachusetts Institute of Technology in Cambridge, Massachusetts. Her cousin, socialite and actress Edie Sedgwick, was one of her private students.

She exhibited at the Pennsylvania Academy of the Fine Arts from 1945 to 1947. She was the winner of several awards: the A.H. Huntington First Prize, the Rome Collaborative Competition (1939), and the I.B.M. Competition (1943), among others.

== Death ==
On May 22, 1995, Saarinen died in Cohasset, Massachusetts at the age of 83. She is survived by son Eric Saarinen, daughter Susan Saarinen, and grandchildren Erik and Mark Wilkinson, Evan Sedgwick Saarinen, Eliot Eames Saarinen and Katrina Bergman Field.
