= Dorf's Golf Bible =

1987 film

- Directed by: Roger Beatty
- Written by: Tim Conway
- Starring: Tim Conway; Eddie Deezen; Michele Smith
- Distributed by: J2 Communications
- Release date: July 31, 1988
- Running time: 30 minutes
- Language: English

Dorf's Golf Bible is a 1988 comedy short film starring Tim Conway, Eddie Deezen and Michele Smith along with a special appearance by Sam Snead.

== Cast ==
- Tim Conway as Dorf
- Eddie Deezen as Waldo
- Michele Smith as "Boom-Boom" LaRue, The Angel of Numbers.
- Sam Snead as Himself, Golf Tutor to Dorf.
