= Eddie Deezen =

American actor (b. 1957)

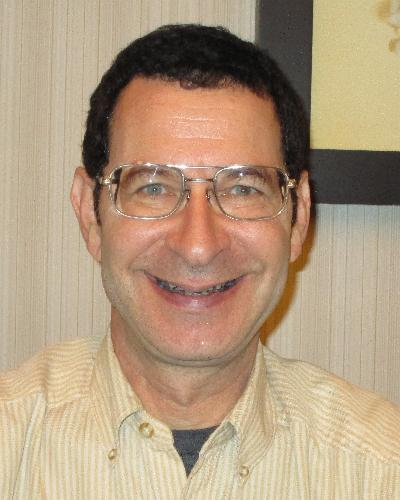
- Deezen at Chiller Theatre Expo in Parsippany, New Jersey, in 2012
- Born: Edward Deezen; March 6, 1957 (age 69); Cumberland, Maryland, U.S.
- Occupations: Actor; comedian
- Years active: 1977–present
- Website: eddiedeezen.com

Edward Deezen (born March 6, 1957) is an American character actor and comedian, best known for portraying "nerdy" characters in several films, including Grease (1978), Robert Zemeckis's I Wanna Hold Your Hand (1978), Steven Spielberg's 1941 (1979), Midnight Madness (1980), Grease 2 (1982), Zapped! (1982), WarGames (1983), Surf II (1984), and Critters 2: The Main Course (1988). He also had leading roles in direct-to-video productions such as Beverly Hills Vamp (1988), Mob Boss (1990), and Teenage Exorcist (1991).

Deezen is also known for his voice-over work in animation, most notably as Mandark in the Cartoon Network series Dexter's Laboratory (1996–2003). In 2004, he reunited with Zemeckis, portraying the Know-It-All Kid in the motion capture film The Polar Express.

== Early life ==
Deezen was born to Jewish parents Irma (née Calet) and Robert Dezen in Cumberland, Maryland. His parents owned a jewelry store. A class clown in his youth, Deezen aspired to become a stand-up comedian.

Deezen graduated from Allegany High School in 1975. Days after his graduation Deezen moved to Los Angeles, California. As a stand-up comedian, Deezen performed at The Comedy Store and appeared on an episode of The Gong Show in the mid-1970s, only to be gonged by singer-songwriter Paul Williams. After a poorly received act and having difficulty memorizing his routine, Deezen eventually decided to abandon stand-up and focus on acting.

== Career ==
=== Mainstream film ===
In 1977, Deezen landed his first role in the film Grease, playing nerdy student Eugene Felsnic.

Following the commercial success of Grease, Deezen was cast in a series of comedy films, including Robert Zemeckis' I Wanna Hold Your Hand and Steven Spielberg's epic comedy 1941. By 1979, Deezen was in such demand that he was frequently obliged to decline some roles as he was already working: two such notable instances included the characters of Eaglebauer in Rock 'n' Roll High School and Spaz in Meatballs, both of which he turned down to appear in 1941. Throughout the early 1980s, Deezen appeared in several high-profile studio releases, including Midnight Madness (1980), Zapped! (1982), WarGames (1983), Million Dollar Mystery (1987), as well as reprising the role of Eugene Felsnic in Grease 2 (1982), one of only seven actors from the original Grease to return for the sequel.

In 1984, Deezen was cast in a major television role, playing the role of superintendent Eddie on the first season of the NBC sitcom Punky Brewster. After filming eight episodes, however, Deezen quit due to his discomfort while performing for a live audience and continuing difficulty in remembering his lines.

=== Independent film ===
After WarGames wrapped, Deezen worked exclusively in independent film for the remainder of the 1980s, starting with his first starring role in the 1984 cult comedy Surf II: The End of the Trilogy, where he played the antagonist, mad scientist Menlo Schwartzer.

Deezen worked steadily throughout the remainder of the 1980s and early 1990s, continuing to play stereotypical "nerds" in both bit parts and major roles, including The Whoopee Boys (1986), the ensemble comedy Million Dollar Mystery (1987), Critters 2: The Main Course (1988), and The Silence of the Hams (1994). He worked several times alongside comedian Tim Conway, most notably appearing in two of his Dorf videos, and struck up a partnership with low-budget filmmaker and producer Fred Olen Ray, who gave Deezen leading roles with the films Beverly Hills Vamp (1988), Mob Boss (1990), and Teenage Exorcist (1991).

Following his cameo appearance as a security guard in the 1996 Leslie Nielsen spoof Spy Hard, Deezen wouldn't appear in a live-action film for another 17 years. In a July 2009 interview, Deezen talked about his struggle maintaining an acting career, saying "The truth is, it is extremely tough to sustain a career in Hollywood. It is tough enough ever getting work, just the sheer odds. I loved John [Badham] and Matthew [Broderick] and it would definitely be my pleasure to work with them again. Believe me, if the right role was there and available, I'd be there in a second".

Throughout the 2010s, Deezen appeared in several short films, including as himself in 2012's I Love You, Eddie Deezen, a nervous airline passenger in 2015's Flight Fright and opposite Larry Thomas and Caryn Richman in the short comedy The Love Suckers, which screened at the 2017 New York City International Film Festival. Deezen returned to live-action films in Fred Olen Ray's 2013 television film All I Want for Christmas in a cameo as a supposed A-list action film star being interviewed on a daytime talk show.

=== Voice acting ===
In the mid-1980s, Deezen transitioned into voice acting, a change of pace he favored due to better pay and not needing to memorize extensive dialogue. His early voice roles included Donnie Dodo in Sesame Street Presents: Follow That Bird (1985), and Snipes the Magpie in Don Bluth's 1991 film Rock-a-Doodle. Deezen was also considered for the roles of the eponymous character and Judge Doom in Who Framed Roger Rabbit, which respectively went to Charles Fleischer and Christopher Lloyd.

Deezen eventually found full-time voice work on television in the mid-1990s, playing recurring characters on the animated series Grimmy, Duckman, Kim Possible and What's New, Scooby-Doo?, as well as guest spots on many others, including Johnny Bravo, Recess, and Darkwing Duck. His best-known role is as Mandark, the nemesis of Dexter in Dexter's Laboratory. Deezen also voiced the character on the TV special Dexter's Laboratory: Ego Trip and the video games Cartoon Network Racing and FusionFall.

In 2004, Deezen supplied voice and motion capture performance for Robert Zemeckis' holiday film The Polar Express, playing the role of the nerdy "Know-It-All". He reprised this role for the subsequent video game.

Deezen regularly voice acted in radio and television commercials. In the late 1990s, he provided the voice of Pop (of Snap, Crackle and Pop) in commercials for Rice Krispies cereal and Nacho, the mascot for Taco Bell's kid's meals commercials, alongside Rob Paulsen as Dog. In 2011, Deezen was under consideration for succeeding Gilbert Gottfried as the voice of the Aflac Duck, but did not win the role.

== Personal life ==
After having lived in Cumberland, Maryland, and Los Angeles, California throughout his career, Deezen currently lives in Spartanburg, South Carolina. He is a fan of the Beatles, and was interviewed for Me and Graham: The Soundtrack of Our Lives, a documentary following two filmmakers searching for the ultimate Beatles fan. For over a year, his official website featured a difficult Beatles trivia quiz - devised by Deezen himself - with a $100 prize for anyone who could answer all the questions correctly. Deezen revealed in a later interview that nobody had ever claimed the prize.

Deezen also has a strong interest in pop culture trivia, and since 2011 has contributed to several trivia websites including mental_floss, TodayIFoundOut.com and Neatorama.com. While most of Deezen's articles focus on The Beatles and their members, he also writes about such subjects as baseball, American history and classic comedy acts like The Three Stooges, the Marx Brothers, and Martin and Lewis.

Although he was raised Jewish, he became a Scientologist after being introduced to it by John Travolta. In a 2012 interview, he acknowledged his status as a Scientologist but stated he had not been active in the Church of Scientology lately.

In June 2021, Deezen was dropped by his public relations manager, Steve Joiner, after a waitress accused Deezen of stalking her while at work and writing abusive Facebook posts about her. Deezen and Joiner subsequently reconciled.

In October 2026, Deezen received criticism after posting on Facebook that he asked out a 16-year-old girl after approaching her in a local Starbucks. After receiving backlash online, Deezen argued that he didn't know that she was underage when he approached her, and that he ended the conversation after discovering her age. He received further criticism for comparing people's reactions online to "homophobia".

=== Health ===
On January 6, 2020, Deezen underwent open heart surgery at Ruby Memorial Hospital in Morgantown, West Virginia. On January 16, 2020, he developed an infection of pneumonia while recovering at the hospital. He was then transferred to a rehab facility in Cumberland, Maryland, on February 6, 2020, to begin recovery.

=== Legal issues ===
On September 16, 2021, Deezen was arrested for allegedly assaulting a police officer after refusing to leave a restaurant in LaVale, Maryland. According to the Allegany County Sheriff's Department, he had been asked by the restaurant's staff to leave after causing a disturbance and refused to do so, prompting a response from law enforcement. Upon the deputy's arrival, Deezen hid behind a woman in a booth, refused multiple orders to exit, and reportedly threw plates, bowls, and food that struck one of the deputies. Deezen was eventually removed and detained in the Allegany County Jail to await a court appearance on charges of second-degree assault, disorderly conduct and trespassing.

On April 8, 2022, Deezen was arrested after he unlawfully entered a nursing facility. Two hours before his arrest, he had been told to stay away from the property. According to the Maryland State Police, Deezen was charged with fourth-degree burglary, two counts of trespassing, and one count of disturbing the peace. He was then taken to Allegany County Detention Center. According to Deezen's friend and former social media manager Bob Barnett, it was revealed that Deezen had been struggling with a mental disorder at the time of the incident. In August 2022, he was ruled unfit to stand trial as a result of his mental health struggles and was taken to a psychiatric hospital where he underwent treatment by the Maryland Department of Health.

== Filmography ==
=== Film ===
Year	Film	Role	Notes
1978	Laserblast	Froggy	
1978	Grease	Eugene Felsnic	
1978	I Wanna Hold Your Hand	Richard "Ringo" Klaus	
1979	1941	Herbie Kazlminsky	
1980	Midnight Madness	Wesley	
1981	Steigler and Steigler	Red	
1982	Grease 2	Eugene Felsnic	
1982	Zapped!	Sheldon	
1983	WarGames	Eddie Malvin	
1983	A Polish Vampire in Burbank	Sphincter	
1984	Surf II: The End of the Trilogy	Menlo Schwartzer	
1984	The Rosebud Beach Hotel	Sydney	
1984	E. Nick: A Legend in His Own Mind	Nicky Vanacuzzi, Jr.	
1985	Mugsy's Girls	Lane	
1985	Sesame Street Presents: Follow That Bird	Donnie Dodo	Voice
1986	The Longshot	Parking Attendant	Cameo
1986	The Whoopee Boys	Eddie Lipschitz	
1987	Happy Hour	Hancock	
1987	Million Dollar Mystery	Rollie	
1988	Critters 2: The Main Course	Hungry Heifer Manager	
1988	Assault of the Killer Bimbos	Dopey Deputy	
1988	Dorf's Golf Bible	Waldo	Short film
1988	Beverly Hills Vamp	Kyle Carpenter	
1989	Hollywood Boulevard II	Walter	
1990	Wedding Band	Slappy the Clown	Cameo
1990	Dorf Goes Auto Racing	Dipstick	Short film
1990	The Raven Red Kiss-Off	Himalayan Operator	Cameo
1990	Mob Boss	Tony Anthony	
1991	Rock-a-Doodle	Snipes	Voice
1991	Teenage Exorcist	Eddie	
1994	The Silence of the Hams	Video Cameraman	Cameo
1995	Mr. Payback: An Interactive Movie	Phil the Guard	Short film
1996	Spy Hard	Rancor Guard Who Gets Spit On	Cameo
1997	The Brave Little Toaster to the Rescue	Charlie	Voice
1998	News Traveler	Eddie	
2004	The Polar Express	Know-It-All Kid	Voice and motion-capture
2012	I Love You, Eddie Deezen	Himself	Short film
2015	Flight Fright	Nervous Airline Passenger	Short film
2015	The SpongeBob Movie: Sponge Out of Water	Seagull	Voice
2016	The Love Suckers	Sammy Schwartz	Short film
2023	Critters: All You Can Eat	Big Ed	Short film
2026	Once Upon a Time in Macon	Leon	

=== Television ===
Year	Title	Role	Notes
1979	Champions: A Love Story	Eric Philpot	Television film
1981	Homeroom	Ron Carp	Pilot
1982	The Facts of Life	Grusky	Episode: "The Big Fight"
1983	Magnum, P.I.	Mickey Dalrumple	Episode: "Squeeze Play"
1984	Punky Brewster	Eddie Malvin	12 episodes
1986	The Fall Guy	Merle Monroe	Episode: "Lady in Green"
1989	Monsters	Demon #2	Episode: "The Demons"
1991	Darkwing Duck	Mouth	Voice, episode: "Darkly Dawns the Duck"
1991–1992	Mother Goose and Grimm	Ham	Voice, 7 episodes
1992	Goof Troop	Road Hogs Biker	Voice, episode: "Queasy Rider"
1992, 1994	Eek! The Cat	Ringo / Rat	Voice, 2 episodes
1994	Scooby-Doo! in Arabian Nights	Caliph	Voice, television special
1994	Aaahh!!! Real Monsters	Bulletin Board Monster	Voice, episode: "Attack of the Blobs"
1994	The Pink Panther	Robot	Voice, episode: "You Only Pink Twice"
1994–1996	Duckman	Iggy Catalpa	Voice, 3 episodes
1995	The Computer Wore Tennis Shoes	Agent Tucker	Television film
1996–2003	Dexter's Laboratory	Mandark, additional voices	Voice, 22 episodes
1996–1997	Life with Louie	Melvin	Voice, 4 episodes
1996	Mighty Ducks: The Animated Series	Alvin Yasbek	Voice, episode: "Mondo-Man"
1996	Timon & Pumbaa	Bahuka	Voice, episode: "Oahu Wahoo"
1997	The Weird Al Show	The Guy Boarded Up in the Wall	Voice, 4 episodes
1998	Cow and Chicken	Glasses Boy	Voice, episode: "Horn Envy"
1998	What a Cartoon!	Ice Cream Guy	Voice, episode: ""Kenny and the Chimp: Diseasy Does It!"
1998	The Lionhearts	Tex Hardbottom	Voice, episode: "Brown Dog Day"
1998	The Secret Files of the Spy Dogs	D'Cell	Voice, episode: "D'Cell"
1999	Dexter's Laboratory: Ego Trip	Mandark	Voice, television special
1999	Johnny Bravo	Oswald	Voice, episode: "Johnny Goes to Camp"
1999–2000	Disney's Recess	Frank 'Tiny' Sedgwick	Voice, 3 episodes
2000	Pigs Next Door	Ben Crenshaw	Voice, 13 episodes
2001–2004	Lloyd in Space	Larry	Voice, 7 episodes
2001–2003	Oswald	Andy Pumpkin	Voice, 7 episodes
2002–2007	Kim Possible	Ned	Voice, 4 episodes
2003–2005	What's New, Scooby-Doo?	Gibby Norton	Voice, 3 episodes
2005	Kim Possible Movie: So the Drama	Ned	Voice, television special
2005	Coconut Fred's Fruit Salad Island!	Slurpy the Bat	Voice, episode: "5 Nuts and a Baby"
2009	Chowder	Todd	Voice, episode: "Sheboodles"
2009	SpongeBob SquarePants	Himself	Episode: "SpongeBob's Truth or Square"
2010	Pound Puppies	Carlton J. Stankmeyer	Voice, episode: "The Yipper Caper"
2012	Handy Manny	Zip	Voice, 2 episodes
2013	All I Want for Christmas	Larry Eastwood	Cameo; Television film
2015	Star vs. the Forces of Evil	Squares	Voice; episode: "Party With a Pony"
2015	Transformers: Robots in Disguise	Ped	Voice, episode: "Can You Dig It?"
2016	Wander Over Yonder	Cartoon Peepers	Voice, episode: "The Cartoon"

=== Video games ===
Year	Title	Voice role
2001	Dexter's Laboratory: Science Ain't Fair	Mandark
2002	Dexter's Laboratory: Mandark's Lab?	Mandark
2004	The Polar Express	Know-It-All Kid
2006	Cartoon Network Racing	Mandark
2009	FusionFall	Mandark
