= Cleve Hall =

Special effects and make-up artist (1959–2021)

Cleve A. Hall
- Born: June 22, 1959; Florida, U.S.
- Died: March 31, 2021 (aged 61); Burbank, California, U.S.
- Occupations: Special effects artist; make-up artist; actor

Cleve A. Hall (June 22, 1959 – March 31, 2021) was an American special effects artist, make-up artist, and actor who starred on the Syfy reality television series Monster Man.

== Career ==
Hall's first major job as an effects artist was on the 1981 slasher film Nightmare, which was shot on location in Florida near where Hall was living at the time.

Although digital special effects became more popular in the 1990s, Hall continued using physical based effects and received an Emmy nomination for his work on Yo Gabba Gabba!. He also created props for bands such as Kiss (for whom he created Gene Simmons' chest armor), Insane Clown Posse, and Alice Cooper.

As an actor, Hall appeared in numerous films beginning in the mid-1980s, most often portraying psychotic killers. In the 2012 film Black Dahlia Haunting, Hall played the killer of Elizabeth Short and won Best Killer Award for his performance at the 2013 Shockfest Film Festival. He also played keyboards in punk and death rock bands, such as Mad Love while living in Florida, and Exquisite Corpse in Los Angeles in the 1980s. He played keyboards with the gothic/Celtic/metal band Urn.

Hall starred in the Syfy reality television series Monster Man, working with Sota F/X.

== Personal life ==
Hall had two daughters, Constance and Elora, who were part of his special effects team. They co-starred on his reality show Monster Man, along with his ex-wife, Sonia Hall. Hall resided in Los Angeles with his family.

== Death ==
Hall died at Providence Saint Joseph Medical Center on March 31, 2021, in Burbank, California, of congestive heart failure.

== Selected filmography ==
Year	Title
1981	Nightmare
1983	Metalstorm: The Destruction of Jared-Syn
1984	Ragewar aka The Dungeonmaster
1985	Ghoulies
1985	Pee-wee's Big Adventure
1985	Zone Troopers
1986	Re-Animator
1986	Troll
1986	Eliminators
1986	TerrorVision
1987	Twisted Nightmare
1988	Rollerblade Warriors: Taken by Force
1990	Alienator
1993	The Sandlot
2011	The Summer of Massacre: Son of the Boogyman
2021	Seasons
