= Eric Saarinen =

American cinematographer (1942–2024)

- Born: June 26, 1942; Detroit, Michigan, U.S.
- Died: December 21, 2024 (aged 82)
- Occupations: Cinematographer, film director
- Parents: Eero Saarinen (father); Lilian Swann (mother)
- Relatives: Susan Saarinen (sister); Eliel Saarinen (paternal grandfather); Loja Gesellius (paternal grandmother); Arthur Swann (maternal grandfather); Susan Sedgwick (maternal grandmother); Pipsan Swanson (aunt); Lucy Schwartz (aunt); Edie Sedgwick (first cousin once removed)

Eric Saarinen (June 26, 1942 – December 21, 2024) was an American cinematographer and film director. His parents were the architect Eero Saarinen and his first wife, the sculptor Lilian Swann Saarinen.

Saarinen has photographed several features, including The Hills Have Eyes directed by Wes Craven and Lost in America directed by Albert Brooks. Saarinen was the cinematographer on Exploratorium, which was nominated for the Academy Award for Best Documentary (Short Subject) at the 47th Academy Awards in 1974. In 1982 he finished the film Symbiosis, which was shown in Walt Disney World for 28 million people. It was filmed in 24 countries on 70 mm film.

Saarinen directed and coproduced a documentary about his father's work in the PBS series American Masters. His parents divorced when Eric was 11 years old. As a student he worked in his father's office, but he did not become as passionate about architecture as his father and his grandfather Eliel Saarinen were. His first cousin once removed is Edie Sedgwick.

Saarinen died on December 21, 2024 at the age of 82.

== Filmography ==
=== Cinematographer ===
- Gimme Shelter (1970)
- Jimi Plays Berkeley (1971)
- Fillmore (1972)
- F.T.A. (1972)
- Tidal Wave (1973)
- Exploratorium (1974)
- Summer School Teachers (1975)
- Eat My Dust! (1976)
- Juan Pérez Jolote (1977)
- The Life and Times of Grizzly Adams (TV series, 1977)
- The Hills Have Eyes (1977)
- You Light Up My Life (1977)
- Rooster: Spurs of Death! (1978)
- Starhops (1978)
- Real Life (1979)
- A Great Bunch of Girls (1979)
- Headin' for Broadway (1980)
- Modern Romance (1981)
- Boxoffice (1982)
- Symbiosis (1982)
- The Golden Seal (1983)
- Lost in America (1985)
- Eero Saarinen: The Architect Who Saw the Future (2016)
