= Nightmare (1981 film) =

1981 American slasher film directed by Romano Scavolini

- Theatrical release poster
- Directed by: Romano Scavolini
- Written by: Romano Scavolini
- Produced by: John L. Watkins; William Milling
- Starring: Baird Stafford; Sharon Smith; C.J. Cooke; Mike Cribben; Danny Ronan
- Cinematography: Gianni Fiore
- Edited by: Robert T. Megginson
- Music by: Jack Eric Williams
- Production company: Goldmine Productions
- Distributed by: 21st Century Film Corporation
- Release date: October 23, 1981
- Running time: 97 minutes
- Country: United States
- Language: English
- Budget: $250,000

Nightmare is a 1981 American psychological slasher film written and directed by Romano Scavolini, and starring Baird Stafford and Sharon Smith. Its plot follows a deranged man who, after undergoing an experimental medical procedure, is released from a New York City psychiatric hospital and embarks on a road trip to Florida with the intent of murdering his ex-wife and child.

Scavolini, an Italian director who had previously worked making experimental films, developed the idea for Nightmare after reading newspaper articles about psychiatric patients who had been administered powerful drugs that altered their behavior. He completed the film's screenplay over a two-week period while vacationing in Cocoa Beach, Florida, where he chose to set the majority of the film. The film was shot on location in Florida and New York City in late 1980.

Released by 21st Century Film Corporation in the fall of 1981, Nightmare was met by significant criticism for its graphic violence and sexuality: The Motion Picture Association of America granted it an X rating, and it was later banned in the United Kingdom (where it was released under the alternate title Nightmares in a Damaged Brain) and prosecuted for obscenity as a "video nasty". Three executives for the film's British distribution company faced legal action for releasing the film in its original cut, violating the ruling of the British Board of Film Classification, which mandated that approximately 48 seconds of footage be excised before the film could be screened for the public. In 1984, all three executives were found guilty, two of them sentenced to 18 and 9 months imprisonment, respectively.

The film also garnered controversy for claiming in its press material that Tom Savini had provided the film's special effects, which Savini vehemently denied.

== Plot ==
George Tatum has been incarcerated in a psychiatric institution in NYC for many years after sexually mutilating and murdering a family in Brooklyn. Diagnosed with a variety of disorders, including schizophrenia, amnesia, and epilepsy, George undergoes an experimental procedure during his incarceration that "reprograms" his brain, reforming him into an upstanding citizen. However, he remains plagued by hazy nightmares of a violent incident from his childhood. Upon his release, George visits a peep show in Times Square, which triggers flashbacks to his father's murder.

The following day, George obtains a car. He leaves New York, heading south to the Florida home of his ex-wife, Susan Temper, their daughters Kim and Tammy, and their mischievous young son, C.J., who frequently plays twisted pranks that disturb her and babysitter Kathy. His car breaks down en route in Myrtle Beach, leaving him stranded overnight. There, he follows a woman home from a local bar and brutally slashes her to death. Back in NYC, George's psychiatrists discover he has fled the city and begin tracking his movements.

Meanwhile, in Florida, Susan is in a relationship with her boyfriend, Bob Rosen, and struggles with her responsibilities as a single mother. Her house begins receiving numerous disturbing phone calls, which no one realises are being made by George. While Susan is out one night, Kathy gets multiple calls, which unnerve her. C.J. begins claiming he is being followed by a strange man–, his father George, unbeknownst to him–, but Susan dismisses it as another of his pranks. Later, George murders Tony, a classmate of C.J., and a teenage girl named Candy in an abandoned house during a game of hide-and-seek.

Kathy agrees to babysit the children the following day while Susan attends a party. During the night, George infiltrates the house and murders Kathy and her boyfriend with a rock pick. After donning one of C.J.'s Halloween masks, an old man, George pursues the children, who have barricaded themselves in the upstairs bedrooms. C.J. obtains a revolver from his mother's dresser and uses it to shoot George a total of 8 times.

During his dying moments, George has a full recollection of his childhood, including a memory of catching his father engaging in sadomasochistic sex acts with another woman, during which he brutally murdered them both with a felling axe. Susan returns home to find police at her house removing George's body, whom Susan hysterically identifies as her husband. C.J., sitting in a police car, winks into the camera knowingly.

== Cast ==
- Baird Stafford as George Tatum
  - Scott Praetorius as Young George Tatum
- Sharon Smith as Susan Temper
- C.J. Cooke as C.J. Temper
- Mik Cribben as Bob Rosen
- Danny Ronan as Kathy
- William Milling as Paul Williamson
- Tammy Patterson as Tammy Temper
- Kim Patterson as Kim Temper
- Candese Marchese as Candy
- William Paul as Steve
- Kathleen Ferguson as Barbara
- Tommy Bouvier as Joe
- Geoffrey Marchese as Tony Walker
- Michael Sweney as Burt Daniels
- John L. Watkins as Man With Cigar

== Production ==
=== Development ===
Scavolini was inspired to write the screenplay for the film after reading articles in Time and Newsweek concerning psychiatric patients who had been administered powerful drugs that altered their behavior. He wrote the screenplay while visiting friends in Cocoa Beach, Florida, over a period of 15 days. Scavolini recalled: "[I was] trying to tell a story and not just hit the stomach of the viewers. To hit the spectator's stomach, you need to tell a story that has its roots in reality, not in fantasy. The massacre of the father and mother by the young Tatum is not the explosion of a mental disorder but flows from the inability of him to "understand" that his parents love to have sex through sadomasochistic practices...In my film there is no hope, because the real and final message is that we are all at the mercy of our demons."

The film was also influenced by Scavolini's earlier work in hardcore pornography, which could explain the amount of extraneous nudity and the bare context behind the bloodletting that the film contains.

=== Filming ===
Nightmare marked the first and only film produced by the independent Goldmine Productions. Principal photography took place in Cocoa Beach, Florida, with additional photography in New York City. According to producer and actor William Milling, the primary shoot in Florida occurred over a twelve-day period, where the cast and crew worked for at least 12 hours per day. Milling stated that the film's production budget was approximately $250,000.

=== Special effects ===
One review published on the film's opening day opined that "the bloodshed has been rendered with loving attention to detail." Tom Savini receives a credit for providing special effects on the film, though during its release he would vehemently deny involvement. According to director Scavolini, artists Daryll Ferrucci, Ed French, Johane Hansen, and Robin Stevens were responsible for prosthetic effects, crafting the dummies used as corpses in the film; they receive credit as "special effects makeup artist" and "special effects makeup assistant." This work was completed in New York City, according to Scavolini. On set, however, Scavolini claims that Savini was present and oversaw the directing of all master special effects sequences, including the beheading scene of George's mother and father. Scavolini stated it was "incontrovertible" that Savini contributed to the film, and added: "I never understood why [he] has denied having worked on the set," though he suggested it may have been a result of a salary disagreement between Savini and Goldmine Productions. Actor Baird Stafford confirmed Savini's presence on the set in an interview produced for the film's Blu-ray and DVD release. Photographs of Savini on the film set also corroborate his presence there.

Cleve Hall, a then-inexperienced local artist, managed the crew of the film's special effects at the Florida locations. Hall's recollection of Savini's connection to the picture was that the filmmakers had initially wanted Savini to oversee all of the special effects; Savini, however, recommended his friend Ed French for the project, but French opted not to sign on.

== Release ==
Prior to receiving distribution through 21st Century Film Corporation, Warner Bros. and Universal Pictures screened the film, expressing potential interest, but only agreed to purchase it for distribution contingent on the film's gore sequences being significantly truncated. Scavolini refused, as he felt "the strongest scenes had to remain uncut because the film should be a scandalous event." 21st Century Film Corporation purchased the film for distribution, though it was released with an X rating in 117 New York theaters on October 23, 1981. During its first week of screening in New York City, some theater locations stayed open 24 hours a day to show the film all day and night as a marketing gimmick. It opened in regional markets the following month, premiering in Louisville, Kentucky on November 27, 1981, before releasing in Los Angeles in April 1982.

=== Censorship ===
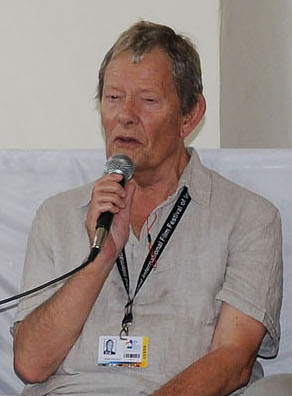
Film critic Derek Malcolm testified during legal proceedings against the film's British distributors, defending the film for its artistic merit

In the United Kingdom, Nightmare was labeled a "video nasty" and prosecuted for violation of the Obscene Publications Act 1959; of the 72 films named "video nasties," it was the only title to receive prosecution for obscenity. In October 1982, a judge ordered that 212 videocassettes of the film obtained during raids in London and Leeds be destroyed.

In February 1984, David Hamilton-Grant, Malcolm Fancey, and Roger Morley—each executives of the film's British distribution company—were arrested and faced prosecution for releasing the film in a cut unauthorized by the British Board of Film Classification (BBFC), which included 48 seconds of footage that the BBFC had not approved. Hamilton-Grant and Fancey were sentenced to 18 and 9 months imprisonment, respectively, while Morley received a fine of £250. Hamilton-Grant's prison sentence was ultimately reduced to 6 months. Two film critics testified during the trial, one of them Derek Malcolm, defending the film's artistic merit. Malcolm expressed disappointment over the ruling against the distributors, calling it an "extraordinary decision."

The film remained banned in the United Kingdom until 2001, when an edited version was released.

=== Critical response ===
Janet Maslin of The New York Times gave the film an unfavorable review, noting: "Though everything else about Nightmare is amateurish, and though its surprises are dependably unsurprising, the bloodshed has been rendered with a loving attention to detail. Garotting, slicing, puncturing and chopping are filmed at close range and accompanied by gurgling sounds. Mr. Scavolini, who does nothing here to advance this currently fashionable art form, also favors the trick whereby an ostensible scare turns out to be a practical joke." Bill Carlton of the New York Daily News also lambasted the film, granting it a 0-star rating and criticizing its violence, declaring: "This is the most repulsive, offensive, degrading, gory, depraved and horrifying movie ever made." Stephen Hunter of The Baltimore Sun described it as "wretchedly filmed" and deemed it a "garish atrocity, a new low in the cinema of depravity."

The Los Angeles Times's Linda Gross compared the film to Taxi Driver (1976) and Halloween (1978), and described it as a "gruesome and vicious movie." Dale Schneck of The Morning Call praised the film for its performances and suspense, summarizing it as "gory, gut-wrenching, nihilistic filmmaking. It is sure to cause some sleepless nights for moviegoers whose most frightening nightmare is the recall of this outrageous new film."

TV Guide was critical of the film, noting: "Given its earnest claims to Freudian psychological complexity, this pretentious gorefest (recipient of a self-imposed X rating) would be laughable if it weren't so repulsive."

=== Home media ===
Nightmare was released on VHS in the United States in 1982 by Planet Video. The government action brought against the film in the United Kingdom led to a black market for it in the mid-late 1980s, where the cost of video copies reached £100.

Seattle-based home media distributor Code Red released a two-disc 30th Anniversary special edition DVD in 2011, which was reissued as a 35th Anniversary edition in 2015. A limited edition Blu-ray was also issued by Code Red in 2014. In May 2018, Kino Lorber announced a reissue of the Blu-ray in conjunction with Code Red scheduled for a July 17, 2018 release, but it did not materialize.

In 2023, Severin Films announced a 3-disc 4K UHD edition, with a 99-minute cut of the film sourced from U.S. and European internegatives. In addition to special features including an interview with Tom Savini, who was erroneously credited as special effects director, the release contained a full-length documentary: Damaged: The Very British Obscenity of David Hamilton-Grant.

Also, Severin Films released a novelization written by Michael Gingold, which features scenes not included in the movie.

== Legacy ==
A clip from Nightmare was featured prominently in the 2021 British psychological horror film Censor, which is centered around the video nasty controversy in the United Kingdom.

== Sources ==
- Baschiera, Stefano (2016). Italian Horror Cinema. Edinburg, Scotland: Edinburg University Press. ISBN 978-0-748-69353-5.
- Edwards, Matthew (2017). "A White Dress for Marialé and Nightmares in a Damaged Brain: An Interview with Romano Scavolini". Twisted Visions: Interviews with Cult Horror Filmmakers. Jefferson, North Carolina: McFarland. ISBN 978-1-476-62814-1.
- Harper, Jim (2004). Legacy of Blood: A Comprehensive Guide to Slasher Movies. Manchester, England: Critical Vision. ISBN 978-1-900-48639-2.
- Milling, William (2015). An Interview with William Milling. Nightmare (Blu-ray documentary feature). Code Red.
- Rockoff, Adam (2016). Going to Pieces: The Rise and Fall of the Slasher Film, 1978–1986. Jefferson, North Carolina: McFarland. ISBN 978-0-786-49192-6.
- Scavolini, Romano (2015) [2011]. An Interview with Romano Scavolini. Nightmare (Blu-ray documentary feature). Code Red.
- Stafford, Baird; Hall, Cleve; Ward, Tom (2015) [2011]. Featurette with Baird Stafford, Cleve Hall, and Tom Ward. Nightmare (Blu-ray documentary feature). Code Red.
