= Dorf Goes Auto Racing =

1990 film

- Directed by: Barry Landon
- Written by: Tim Conway
- Starring: Tim Conway; Eddie Deezen
- Distributed by: J2 Communications
- Release date: 1990
- Running time: 30 minutes
- Language: English

Dorf Goes Auto Racing is a 1990 comedy short film starring Tim Conway, Eddie Deezen and Tim Conway Jr.

== Plot ==
European race car driver Duessel Dorf (a pun on the German city) travels to the United States to compete in a stock car race at Sears Point Raceway, where NASCAR racers respond to his arrival. With a pit crew, Dorf utilizes a tendency to create chaos while attempting to win the race.

This was the last appearance in the series for Boom-Boom LaRue (Michele Smith); she had appeared in all four films to date.

An unfortunate plot line involves a beautiful love interest named Gwendolyn.

“There’s a little bit of Dorf in all of us. But there’s a little more in Gwendolyn.”

== Cast ==
- Tim Conway as Duessel Dorf / Pops Morgan
- Eddie Deezen as Eddie Taylor
- Michele Smith as "Boom-Boom" LaRue
- Anthony De Franco as Tony (credited as Anthony DeFranco)
- Tim Conway Jr. as Willie
- Jim Moore as Jim "Timber Jim"
- Roy Conrad as Dull Banquet Speaker
- William Jeanes as Colonel Bolus
- Joey Mitchell as Interviewer
- Mic Martin as Hotel Clerk
- Sharon Baker as Dowager At Banquet
- John Lewis as Foreign Announcer
- Ed Smith as Cop
- Don Strickland as Announcer
- Bill Douglas as Skid Car Driver
- Steve Syatt as Clown's Voice
- Bruce Flanders as Track Announcer
- Jack Arute as Himself (credited as Jack Aroute)
- Hoyt Axton as Himself
- Geoff Bodine as Himself
- Bob Bondurant as Himself
- Neil Bonnett as Himself
- Bill Brodrick as Himself
- Mike Douglas as Himself
- Ned Jarrett as Himself
- Greg Johnson as Himself
- Glen Long as Himself
- Stuart Miller as Himself
- Phil Parsons as Himself
- Richard Petty as Himself
- Les Richter as Himself
- Ken Schrader as Himself
- Rusty Wallace as Himself
- Darrell Waltrip as Himself (credited as Darrel Waltrip)
- Michael Waltrip as Himself (credited as Mike Waltrip)
