= Jillian Kesner-Graver =

American actress (1949–2007)

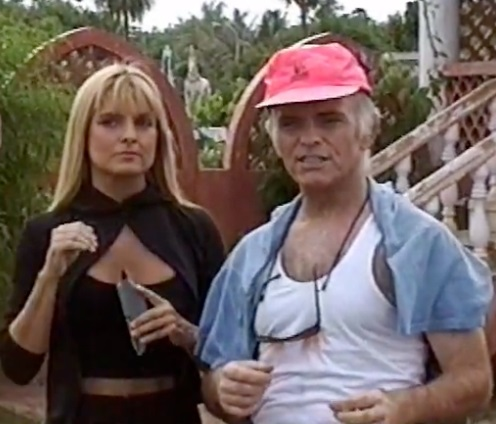
- Kesner-Graver with Michael Cavanaugh filming Inferno in 1996
- Born: Jillian Kesner; August 9, 1949; Portsmouth, Virginia, U.S.
- Died: December 5, 2007 (aged 58); Irvine, California, U.S.
- Occupations: Actress; film historian
- Years active: 1976–2006
- Spouse: Gary Graver (m. 1981; died 2006)

Jillian Kesner-Graver (August 9, 1949 – December 5, 2007), credited onscreen as Jillian Kesner, was an American actress and historian who worked with her husband, Gary Graver, to preserve the work and legacy of director Orson Welles. She was best known as an actress for playing Fonzie's girlfriend, Lorraine, on a 1977 episode of Happy Days.

== Early life ==
Kesner-Graver was born in Portsmouth, Virginia. Her father was in the United States Navy and she spent much of her childhood in Denver, Colorado. She first moved to Los Angeles in 1959, where she worked as a model before getting into television and movie acting.

== Career ==
Kesner-Graver was best known for playing Fonzie's girlfriend, Lorraine, on Happy Days. She appeared in a number of "B-rated" films throughout the 1970s, 1980s and 1990s. Her credits included Raw Force, Starhops and Beverly Hills Vamp. She developed a following among fans of B-level action films. She also costarred in Roots of Evil with Alex Cord, directed by her husband.

She appeared on a number of television shows, including Three's Company, The Rockford Files and Mork & Mindy. She met her husband, director and cinematographer, Gary Graver, on the set of the film The Student Body in 1976.

== Death ==
Jillian Kesner-Graver died on December 5, 2007, in Irvine, California of complications from a staphylococcal infection, which she contracted after having been diagnosed with leukemia. She was 58 years old.

== Filmography ==
=== Film ===
Year	Title	Role	Notes
1976	The Student Body	Carrie	
1978	Starhops	Angel	
1980	Ang agila at ang falcon		(English: The Eagle and The Falcon)
1981	Firecracker	Susanne Carter	aka Naked Fist in Australia
1982	Raw Force	Cookie Winchell	aka Kung Fu Cannibals
1982	Trick or Treats	Andrea	
1987	Moon in Scorpio	Claire	
1987	Evil Town	Dorothy	
1989	Jaded	Sara	
1989	Beverly Hills Vamp	Claudia	
1992	Roots of Evil	Brenda	
1997	Operation Cobra	Jasmine	aka Inferno

=== Television ===
Year	Title	Role	Notes
1975	S.W.A.T.	Miss California	Episode: "The Steel-Plated Security Blanket"
1976	The Blue Knight	Lady In Swimsuit	Episode: "Bullseye"
1976	Happy Days	Patty Petrolunga	Episode: "Fonzie the Superstar"
1977	The Hardy Boys/Nancy Drew Mysteries	Paula Clark	Episode: "Mystery of the Solid Gold Kicker"
1977	Happy Days	Lorraine	Episode: "Marion Rebels"
1979	Co-ed Fever	Melba	Main cast
1979	The Rockford Files	Lily Showalter	Episode: "No Fault Affair"
1979	The Ropers	Linda Graham	2 episodes
1981	Three's Company	The sister	Episode: "The Not-So-Great Imposter"
1982	Mork & Mindy	Judi	Episode: "Metamorphosis - The TV Show"
1983	T.J. Hooker	Crystal	Episode: "A Child Is Missing"
1996	Subliminal Seduction	Cherl	TV movie
