= American Thunder (TV series) =

- Program logo
- Genre: Motorcycle lifestyle
- Presented by: Michele Smith
- Country of origin: United States
- Original language: English
- No. of seasons: 11

Original release
- Network: Speed
- Release: 1999 – 2009

American Thunder is a weekly television show on the Speed (TV channel) focusing on American V-twin choppers, including the bikes, parts, lifestyle and culture. The longtime host of American Thunder was Michele Smith. The show later underwent revisions with new hosts.
