= Trick or Treats =

- Directed by: Gary Graver
- Screenplay by: Gary Graver
- Produced by: Caruth C. Byrd; Hedy Dietz; Gary Graver; Glenn Jacobson; Lee Thornburg
- Starring: Jackelyn Giroux; Peter Jason; Chris Graver; David Carradine; Carrie Snodgress; Steve Railsback
- Cinematography: Gary Graver
- Edited by: Gary Graver
- Distributed by: Lone Star Pictures
- Release date: October 1, 1982 (Cincinnati)
- Running time: 91 minutes
- Country: United States
- Language: English
- Budget: $55,000

Trick or Treats is a 1982 American slasher dark comedy film written, shot, edited, and directed by Gary Graver, and starring Jackelyn Giroux, Peter Jason, Chris Graver, David Carradine, Carrie Snodgress, and Steve Railsback. Its plot focuses on an escaped psychiatric patient who attempts to track his young son on Halloween night.

== Plot ==
Malcolm O'Keefe is surprised one morning at breakfast when two men arrive to bring him to a mental asylum so that his wife, Joan, will have him committed. After a brief struggle in the backyard pool, Malcolm is captured and taken away by the men in white. Several years later, Linda is called to babysit Joan's son Christopher on Halloween night while Joan and her new husband, Richard, attend a Halloween party in Las Vegas, where they are performing as magicians. Christopher plays tricks on Linda, such as using a fake guillotine, throwing a smoke bomb at her, and using a joy buzzer.

At the asylum, Malcolm contemplates his escape after having been there for nearly four years. Malcolm manages to escape with help from another inmate and vows to get revenge on those who put him away. After Linda calls her friend Andrea to bring film to her, Linda goes outside to look for Christopher. Malcolm enters the house in search of Joan and hides in the attic. Andrea enters the house, and Malcolm fatally stabs her, mistaking her for Joan.

Linda and Christopher go back into the house, and Brett calls Linda. After the call, Linda goes upstairs to find Christopher asleep. Linda goes downstairs, and Malcolm attacks her. She tricks Malcolm and runs outside and hides in the shed. Malcolm enters the shed and sees all his old belongings, reminiscing over them. Malcolm finds where Linda is hiding, only for her to escape again. She gets in her car, but it won’t start, and then she runs back to the house again.

Linda then barricades Christopher and herself in Christopher’s room. Unbeknownst to Linda, Malcolm burst through the other door to Christopher’s room and attacks Linda once more, this time to be fatally injured by the guillotine toy altered by Linda to become an actual one. After which, Linda goes downstairs to call the police, and Christopher takes Malcolm’s knife. The movie ends with a freeze-frame of Christopher about to stab Linda to death.

== Cast ==
- Jackelyn Giroux as Linda
- Peter Jason as Malcolm O'Keefe
- Chris Graver as Christopher O'Keefe
- David Carradine as Richard Adams
- Carrie Snodgress as Joan O'Keefe Adams
- Steve Railsback as Brett
- Jillian Kesner as Andrea
- Dan Pastorini as 1st Attendant
- Tim Rossovich as 2nd Attendant
- Paul Bartel as Bum
- Catherine E. Coulson as Nurse Reeves
- John Blyth Barrymore as Mad Doctor

== Critical reception ==
AllMovie gave the film a negative review, writing, "Genre fans generously overlook bad logic in exchange for action and overkill, but the plot holes that litter director/screenwriter Gary Graver's story are never plugged with the cheap spectacle that might have given this by-the-numbers stalker film a reason to exist."

== Release ==
The film was first released theatrically in the United States on October 1, 1982, in Cincinnati, Ohio. It later opened in Detroit, Michigan, on October 29, 1982.

It was later released on VHS by Vestron Video.

On November 9, 2013, the film was officially released on DVD with a limited Blu-Ray release by Code Red. The Blu-ray edition was reissued by Code Red in conjunction with Kino Lorber on October 5, 2021.

== See also ==
- List of films set around Halloween
