= Michele Smith (actress) =

American actress and model

- Born: United States
- Occupation: Actress
- Years active: 1987–2005
- Website: www.michelesmith.me

Michele Smith is an American actress and model, most commonly known as the hostess on the TV series American Thunder. She has also been featured in magazines including Playboy, Muscle and Fitness, Swimwear USA, Swimwear International, Neue Revue, Wild Motorcycles, Full Throttle, V-Twin, Hot Rod, Easyriders, and Iron Works. In addition to modeling, she designs women's clothing and lingerie, especially for the motorcycle market.

== Filmography ==
Year	Film	Role	Notes
1987	Dorf on Golf	"Boom-Boom" LaRue	
1987	Dorf's Golf Bible	"Boom-Boom" LaRue	
1988	Dorf and the First Games of Mount Olympus	"Boom-Boom" LaRue	
1988	Out of This World		"Evie's Birthday Wish" episode
1989	Married... with Children	Bunny	"Dead Men Don't Do Aerobics" episode
1990	Blood Salvage	Beauty Contestant	
1990	Dorf Goes Auto Racing	"Boom-Boom" LaRue	
1991	Anything But Love		"I Feel a Cult Coming On" episode
1993	Madison	Sarah	"The Boy Wonder" episode
1994	Robin's Hoods	Dr. Jensen	"Kidnapped Boyfriend" episode
1995	Hologram Man	Casey	
1997	Mary Jane's Not a Virgin Anymore	Fake Wedding Bride	
2000	American Thunder	Host	Speed channel
2005	Wake of the Fallen Sun	Boss	
2010	Two Wheel Thunder - An American Icon	Host	HD Theater
