= Monster Man (TV series) =

American television series

- Genre: Reality
- Starring: Cleve Hall
- Theme music composer: Devo
- Opening theme: Monsterman by Devo
- Composer: Devo
- Country of origin: United States
- Original language: English
- No. of seasons: 1
- No. of episodes: 6

Production
- Executive producers: Dierdre Gurney; Scott Gurney
- Producer: Gurney Productions
- Running time: 60 minutes (42 minutes excluding commercials)

Original release
- Network: Syfy
- Release: March 14 – April 18, 2012

Monster Man is a reality television series shown on Syfy.

== Plot ==
Monster Man follows the work and life of special effects artist Cleve Hall and his family as they work at SOTA F/X designing special effects for various projects. It was first broadcast in March 2012.

== Episodes ==
Ep #	Title	Original release date
101	"Siamese Twins/2 Headed Shark"	March 14, 2012
Cleve Hall is contacted by Sean Cunningham and his son Noel to make a prosthetic torso for a scene where two conjoined twins come apart as part of their upcoming movie. Afterwards, The Asylum contacts SOTA to create a Two-Headed Shark for their movie 2-Headed Shark Attack.
102	"Forbidden Werewolf"	March 21, 2012
Thomas James Churchill approaches Cleve Hall and his family to make a werewolf costume for a film he is making called "Hallow Pointe." The film involves practical effects. Afterwards, Richard Elfman contacts SOTA to design the face for the hideous character Princess Polly for the sequel to Forbidden Zone.
103	"Monster Infestation"	March 28, 2012
Tony Randel approaches Cleve Hall and his family to help make a biomechanical cockroach creature. Afterwards, rising Indie star Petro Papahadjopoulos contacts SOTA to design an exploding demon ant.
104	"Between Arachnid and a Hard Place"	April 4, 2012
Art director Josh Separzedeh comes to SOTA to look for special make-up for an upcoming movie called "Pretties for You." Mike Mendez then has SOTA design a giant flesh-eating spider for his film Mega Spider.
105	"Wee Boots"	April 11, 2012
Jason "Wee-Man" Acuña of Jackass fame approaches SOTA to help make a large-brained alien for a movie that he is making. DreamWorks then has SOTA make the foam boots for the premiere of Puss in Boots.
106	"Devoman vs. Clevezilla"	April 18, 2012
SOTA collaborates with Devo to help out with Devo's next music video by making space suits for the band, a costume of the giant lizard monster (which Cleve had to modify so that he can breathe in the suit), and the outfit for a superhero that fights the giant lizard monster.
