= Gary Graver =

American filmmaker (1938–2006)

- Born: July 20, 1938; Portland, Oregon, U.S.
- Died: November 16, 2006 (aged 68); Rancho Mirage, California, U.S.
- Other name: Robert McCallum
- Education: Grant High School
- Occupations: Film director; cinematographer
- Spouses: Andrea Ellestad (m. 1960) Connie Nelson (m. 1969; div. 1972) April Silva (m. 1974; div. 1976) Jillian Kesner-Graver (m. 1981)
- Children: 2

Gary Foss Graver (July 20, 1938 – November 16, 2006) was an American film director, editor, screenwriter and cinematographer. He was a prolific filmmaker, working in various roles on over 300 films, but is best known as Orson Welles' final cinematographer, working over a period of six years on Welles' epic film The Other Side of the Wind which was released in 2018, 48 years after it was started.

Graver began his career in the late 1960s as a cinematographer and editor of various B-movies, including several films by Roger Corman, before providing additional camerawork on John Cassavetes's A Woman Under the Influence (1974). He continued to serve as the cinematographer of numerous horror films from the late 1970s and through the 1980s, including The Toolbox Murders (1978), Trick or Treats (1982), which he also wrote, edited, and directed; Mortuary (1983), They're Playing with Fire (1984), and Twisted Nightmare (1988).

Under the pseudonym of Robert McCallum, Graver was also a prolific director of adult films, working as a cinematographer and director on 135 features.

== Early life ==
Graver was born July 20, 1938, in Portland, Oregon, to Raleigh and Frances Graver. His father was a native Oregonian, while his mother was born in Washington state. Graver was raised in Portland, where he attended Grant High School. As a teenager, he produced and starred in his own radio show, and built a movie theatre in his parents' basement where he showed his own 16 mm films. He also acted in stage productions for the Portland Civic Theatre.

At age 20, Graver moved to Hollywood to become an actor, and studied acting with Lee J. Cobb and Lucille Ball. He was drafted into the U.S. Army in the early 1960s and quickly joined the Navy instead. He was assigned to a combat camera group and trained as a professional cameraman while touring in Vietnam, the Philippines, and Japan.

== Career ==
=== Feature films ===
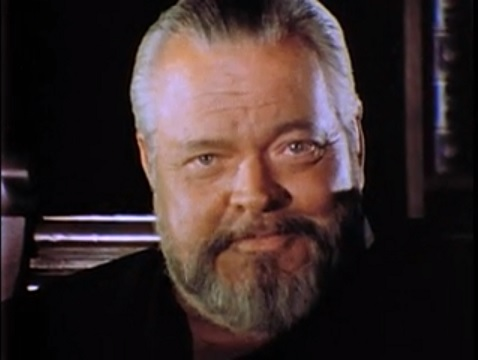
While working on The Other Side of the Wind, Graver lit and photographed the Orson Welles sequences in the 1973 short film Who's Out There?, produced and directed by Robert Drew for NASA.

After returning to civilian life, Graver began his career in Los Angeles working on documentaries for a year before starting to work on larger budget features. Graver wrote and directed his first film, The Embracers, in 1966. He would subsequently serve as the cinematographer and editor on the B-films The Mighty Gorga, The Fabulous Bastard from Chicago, and Satan's Sadists (all 1969).

In 1970, Graver made an unannounced inquiry to Orson Welles, saying he wanted to work with the director. Welles told Graver that only one other person had ever called him to say they wanted to work with him—Gregg Toland, who had worked with Welles on Citizen Kane. Journalist Josh Karp reported:

From that day forward, Orson Welles was the central figure in Gary Graver's life: more important than his wife, his children, his bank account, and his health. For the rest of Orson's life (and his own) Graver belonged to the great director."

Welles and Graver started work on the unfinished film The Other Side of the Wind, in addition to other projects Welles had in the works including F for Fake (1973), which Graver co-shot with French cinematographer François Reichenbach; and Filming Othello (1978).

Graver's work for Welles was unpaid, and during the shooting of one scene in The Other Side of the Wind, Welles used as a prop his 1941 Oscar that he won as the co-writer of Citizen Kane. When shooting was finished, he handed the statuette to Graver saying, "Here, keep this." Graver understood this to be a gift in lieu of payment for his work. Graver held onto the award for several years until he ran into financial trouble in the 1990s, and in 1994 he sold it for $50,000. The purchaser, a company called Bay Holdings, then attempted to sell it at auction through Sotheby's in London. When Welles's daughter Beatrice Welles learned of the intended sale, she successfully sued both Graver and the holding company to stop it. She eventually took possession of the statuette before attempting to sell it herself, however Christie's withdrew it from auction after the Academy objected to the sale.

Besides his work with Welles, Graver also worked for other Hollywood directors including Roger Corman and Fred Olen Ray. The bulk of his output was B-movies since, as he put it, "I knew how to make a movie without much money." While working on The Other Side of the Wind between 1970 and 1976, Graver worked as a cinematographer and editor in various other B-horror films such as Blood Mania (1970), Dracula vs. Frankenstein (1971), and Invasion of the Bee Girls (1973). The following year, Graver contributed additional camerawork on John Cassavetes's A Woman Under the Influence (1974). In 1977, he served as cinematographer for Ron Howard's Grand Theft Auto, followed by the cult horror film The Toolbox Murders (1978).

In 1982, Graver wrote, directed, edited, and produced the slasher film Trick or Treats, after which he served as cinematographer on the slasher film Mortuary (1983), and the comedy Chattanooga Choo Choo (1984). He directed the thriller film Moon in Scorpio starring Britt Ekland in 1987, followed by a cinematography credit on Twisted Nightmare (1988). The following year, Graver provided additional cinematography on Steven Spielberg's Always (1989), working on the film's Montana unit.

=== Adult films ===
Throughout his career in mainstream cinema, Graver also worked as a writer and director of pornographic films, often credited as Robert McCallum. Graver's work in the adult film industry resulted in more than 135 films including Unthinkable, which won the AVN Award for Best All-Sex Video in 1985. Graver was later inducted into the AVN Hall of Fame for his contributions to the adult film industry.

== Death ==
Graver died on November 16, 2006, at his home in Rancho Mirage, California after a lengthy battle with cancer. His widow, former actress Jillian Kesner, died the following year of complications of a staph infection, which she contracted after having been diagnosed with leukemia. Graver had two sons from previous marriages.

Graver's memoir Making Movies with Orson Welles, co-written by Andrew J. Rausch, was published posthumously by Scarecrow Press in 2008.

== Select filmography ==
Year	Title	Cinematographer	Editor	Director	Screenwriter	Notes
1966	The Embracers	No	No	Yes	Yes	Alternate title: The Great Dream
1968	The Kill	Yes	No	Yes	Yes	Short film
1969	The Mighty Gorga	Yes	Yes	No	No	
1969	The Fabulous Bastard from Chicago	Yes	Yes	No	No	
1969	Satan's Sadists	Yes	Yes	No	No	
1969	One Million AC/DC	Yes	No	No	No	Written by Ed Wood
1970	Horror of the Blood Monsters	Yes	No	No	No	Uncredited
1970	Blood Mania	Yes	No	No	No	
1970	The Hard Road	Yes	No	Yes	No	
1971	Dracula vs. Frankenstein	Yes	No	No	No	
1971	London	Yes	No	No	No	Short film written and directed by Orson Welles
1973	Who's Out There	Yes	No	No	No	Short film produced for NASA by Robert Drew; Lighting and photography for the Orson Welles sequences
1973	Midnight Intruders	Yes	No	Yes	Yes	
1973	And When She Was Bad...	No	No	Yes	Yes	
1973	Bummer	Yes	No	No	No	
1973	F for Fake	Yes	No	No	No	Documentary film Co-credit with François Reichenbach
1973	Invasion of the Bee Girls	Yes	No	No	No	
1974	A Woman Under the Influence	Yes	No	No	No	Additional camerawork
1976	Black Heat	Yes	No	No	No	
1976	Woman in the Rain	Yes	No	No	No	
1976	Charlie Siringo	Yes	No	No	No	Television film
1977	Moonshine County Express	Yes	No	No	No	
1977	Grand Theft Auto	Yes	No	No	No	
1978	Doctor Dracula	Yes	No	No	No	
1978	The Toolbox Murders	Yes	No	No	No	
1978	Sunset Cove	Yes	No	No	No	
1978	Deathsport	Yes	No	No	No	
1978	Death Dimension	Yes	No	No	No	Also producer
1978	The One Man Jury	Yes	No	No	No	
1978	Filming Othello	Yes	No	No	No	Documentary film
1979	Smokey and the Hotwire Gang	Yes	No	No	No	
1979	Sunnyside	Yes	No	No	No	
1979	The Glove	Yes	No	No	No	
1980	Scout's Honor	Yes	No	No	No	Television film
1980	The Attic	Yes	No	No	No	
1981	Texas Lighting	Yes	No	Yes	Yes	
1981	Hollywood High Part II	Yes	No	No	No	
1981	Smokey Bites the Dust	Yes	No	No	No	
1982	Trick or Treats	Yes	Yes	Yes	Yes	
1982	Eating Raoul	Yes	No	No	No	Second unit cinematographer
1982	Homework	No	No	No	Yes	Second unit director
1982	The Sword and the Sorcerer	Yes	No	No	No	Additional cinematography
1983	Lost	Yes	No	No	No	
1983	Mortuary	Yes	No	No	No	
1984	Chattanooga Choo Choo	Yes	No	No	No	
1984	They're Playing with Fire	Yes	No	No	No	
1987	Party Camp	No	No	Yes	No	
1987	Moon in Scorpio	Yes	No	Yes	No	
1988	Twisted Nightmare	Yes	No	No	No	
1989	Always	Yes	No	No	No	Additional cinematography (Montana unit)
1991	Ted & Venus	Yes	No	No	No	Second unit cinematographer
1992	Roots of Evil	No	No	Yes	No	
2018	The Other Side of the Wind	Yes	No	No	No	Shot between 1970 and 1976

== Publications ==
- Graver, Gary (2008). Making Movies With Orson Welles. Scarecrow Press. ISBN 978-0-810-88229-4.
