= The Ant Bully (video game) =

2006 video game

- North American Wii version cover art
- Developer: Artificial Mind and Movement
- Publisher: Midway
- Directors: Jean-François Pelletier (PC, GCN, PS2, Wii); David Williams (GBA)
- Producers: Hans Lo; Devin Shatsky (GBA)
- Composer: Gilles Léveillé
- Platforms: PlayStation 2, GameCube, Game Boy Advance, Windows, Wii
- Release: NA: July 24, 2006; EU: July 28, 2006 (PS2, GBA); EU: August 25, 2006 (Windows); Wii: NA: December 5, 2006; AU: December 10, 2006; EU: January 17, 2007
- Genre: Action-adventure
- Mode: Single-player

The Ant Bully is an action-adventure video game developed by Artificial Mind and Movement and published by Midway Games, based on The Ant Bully film. It was released four days before the film on July 24, 2006, with a Wii release that following December.

== Gameplay ==
The game is broken down into missions, though the game follows a linear design. The game is a traditional action-adventure game, with players able to use different weapons to clear a mission and advance to the next level.

== Plot ==
Players control the protagonist, Lucas Nickle, as he is shrunk to a miniature size and forced to work in an ant colony. He goes on many adventures throughout his backyard. From the Cactus Garden, to the Spiders lair, Lucas must overcome the challenges and become an ant. Getting in his way is the local wasp hive and the Exterminator. After overcoming many challenges, Lucas eventually has a mano-a-mano showdown. Lucas first must shoot the Exterminators ear with the Dart bow and avoid his hands and poison. Next, Lucas must blind the Exterminator with the Larva silk squirter. Eventually, Lucas and the wasps drive the Exterminator away after stinging him in the butt. Afterwards, Lucas collects the last of the Fire crystals and returns to normal size, finishing the game.

== Reception ==
Reception

Aggregate score
Aggregator	Score				
Aggregator	GBA	GameCube	PC	PS2	Wii
Metacritic	54/100	51/100	47/100	52/100	45/100

Review scores
Publication	Score				
Publication	GBA	GameCube	PC	PS2	Wii
Eurogamer	N/A	N/A	N/A	N/A	4/10
Game Informer	N/A	6.5/10	6.5/10	6.5/10	6.5/10
GameSpot	6.2/10	4.3/10	4.3/10	4.3/10	3.7/10
GameTrailers	N/A	5/10	5/10	5/10	N/A
GameZone	N/A	N/A	N/A	N/A	6.1/10
IGN	4.5/10	5.5/10	5.5/10	5.5/10	4.5/10
Nintendo Power	N/A	5/10	N/A	N/A	N/A
Nintendo World Report	N/A	N/A	N/A	N/A	4/10
PlayStation Official Magazine – UK	N/A	N/A	N/A	4/10	N/A
PC Gamer (US)	N/A	N/A	60%	N/A	N/A
Detroit Free Press	N/A	N/A	N/A	3/4	N/A
The Times	N/A	N/A	N/A	3/5	N/A

The Game Boy Advance, PlayStation 2 and GameCube versions received "mixed" reviews, while the PC and Wii versions received "generally unfavorable reviews" according to video game review aggregator Metacritic.

Detroit Free Press gave the PS2 version a score of three stars out of four and stated: "The best part of the game is Lucas' maneuverability in getting from Point A to Point B. In some instances, he must glide on a rose pedal. In others, he summons other ants through telepathy, and the group either flings Lucas through the air or operates as an impromptu ladder." The Times gave the same console version a score of three stars out of five and said, "This must be one of the first instances in which a video game actually seems like the natural format. But even here, as you acquire weapons, ride wasps and beat up tiny-huge creatures, it seems never to aspire to much beyond adequacy." However, The Sydney Morning Herald gave the PC and PS2 versions two stars out of five, saying, "The twitchy movement makes it unnecessarily difficult to target enemies with your primitive ant weapons (a lock-on button turns out to be little help) and it's all too easy to fall when carefully crawling up walls."
