= Beverly Hills Vamp =

- Film poster
- Directed by: Fred Olen Ray
- Screenplay by: Ernest D. Farino
- Produced by: Fred Olen Ray; Grant Austin Waldman
- Starring: Eddie Deezen; Britt Ekland; Tim Conway Jr. Tom Shell; Michelle Bauer; Jillian Kesner
- Cinematography: Stephen Ashley Blake
- Edited by: Christopher Roth
- Music by: Chuck Cirino
- Release date: 1989
- Running time: 88 minutes
- Country: United States
- Language: English

Beverly Hills Vamp is a 1989 direct to video comedy horror film directed by Fred Olen Ray and starring Eddie Deezen and Britt Ekland.

== Plot ==
Three nerds, Kyle, Brock and Russell want to make a film, so they take their script to Brock's uncle Aaron Pendleton, a "famous" film director in Hollywood. While Uncle Aaron is reading the script, the boys do a little sightseeing.

First stop is a call girl service in Beverly Hills where they meet Madame Cassandra and her girls; Jessica, Claudia and Kristina, all of whom are vampires. Kyle, trying to be faithful to his girlfriend Molly, leaves the brothel.

When neither Brock nor Russell return home that night, Kyle revisits the brothel. He finds that no one remembers his friends. Kyle goes to the police, but they advise him to wait until his friends show up. Becoming worried, Kyle calls Molly, who catches the next flight to Hollywood.

While explaining the disappearance to Uncle Aaron, Brock shows up, looking pale and clammy and with two bites on his neck. Sure that they are dealing with vampires, they get advice (and props) from Father Ferraro and, one by one, Kyle destroys the vampires...except for Brock and Molly.

== Cast ==
- Eddie Deezen as Kyle Carpenter
- Britt Ekland as Madame Cassandra
- Tom Shell as Russell
- Tim Conway Jr. as Brock Pendleton
- Michelle Bauer as Kristina
- Jillian Kesner as Claudia
- Debra Lamb as Jessica
- Jay Richardson as Aaron Pendleton
- Brigitte Burdine as Molly
- Robert Quarry as Father Ferraro
- Ralph Lucas as Balthazar
- Dawn Waldman as Cleaning Lady

== Reception ==
A reviewer for The Age gave Beverly Hills Vamp a mixed review, comparing Deezen to Jerry Lewis and remarking that the film managed to be "entertaining in a schlocky sort of way". Jerry D. Metz Jr noted that the film did not adhere to typical slasher film tropes, as Deezen's character chose to remain faithful to his girlfriend when he and his friends go to a brothel, as opposed to indulging.

Nick Prueher of the Found Footage Festival posted the trailer to the Festival's website, writing that Vidmark's trailers "were always better than the movie you were about to watch".

An independent reviewer commented: "This is an excellent example of what you can make on a six-day schedule."
