= Hanna Parviainen =

Woman trade counselor for Finland

- Born: 3 August 1874
- Died: 12 February 1938 (aged 63)

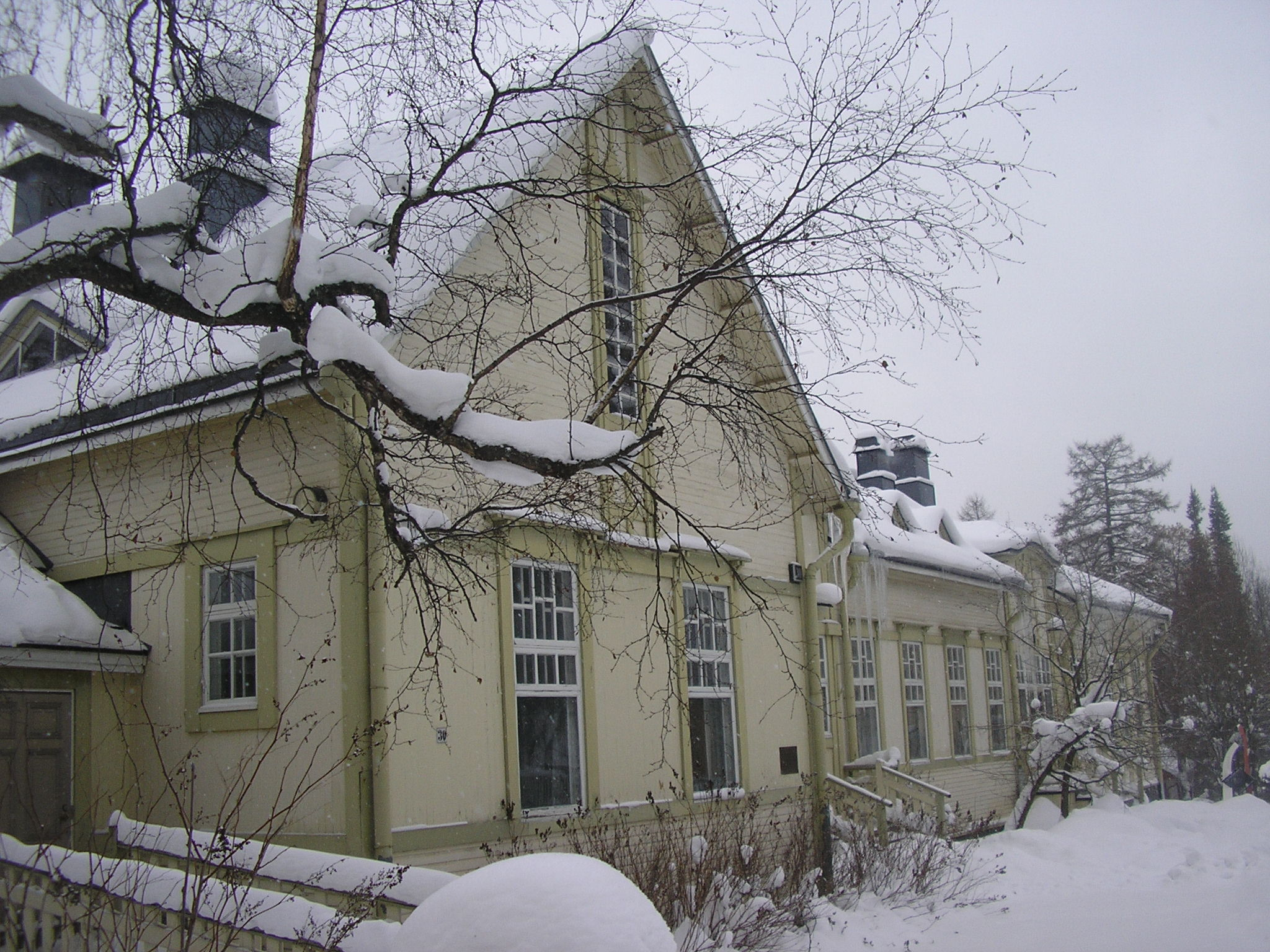
The town house of Hanna Parviainen in Jyväskylä.

Hanna Parviainen (3 August 1874 Jyväskylä – 12 February 1938 Helsinki), the executive managing the family sawmills, was the first woman to become a commercial counsellor for Finland.

== Biography ==
Hanna Maria Parviainen was the daughter of the factory owner, commercial counsellor Johan Parviainen and Maria Charlotta Hedberg. She was educated at a boarding school in Geneva, Switzerland before going to a business school in Stockholm, Sweden. Parviainen worked as an accountant for her father till his death in 1900, after which she took over managing the farms owned by the family. She inherited the plywood factory and the Säynätsalo islands in 1925 when her father and both her brothers had died. Before that in 1922–1925 she acted as the manager of Joh. Parviainen Ltd and Kiminki Ltd. In 1923–1936 she was the member of the board of administration of Joh. Parviaisen Tehtaat Ltd, and in 1923–1925 member of the board of directors. After inheriting the business, she became the chair till 1930. Hanna Parviainen was afforded the title of commercial counsellor in 1926 as the first woman in Finland. However, in the aftermath of the Great Depression Parviainen had to sell her businesses to the banks.

Parviainen had a paternalistic attitude to her workforce. She e.g. had a house created for the workforce designed by W. G. Palmqvist. Parviainen had befriended herself with the architect Wivi Lönn, who e.g. designed an orchard in the Sulkula model farm on the shores of Lake Jyväsjärvi as well as several buildings on the Säynätsalo islands including a kindergarten and a home for the elderly. Hanna Parviainen fulfilled her parents wishes by building a church: she commissioned the plans of the Säynätsalo Church from the well-known architect Armas Lindgren and donated the building to the parish.

Parviainen was a philanthropist favouring especially female organizations. She lived the rest of her life with Wivi Lönn. When she died she donated her wealth to the YWCA.
