= Gesellius, Lindgren, Saarinen =

Finnish architectural firm

Practice information
- Key architects: Herman Gesellius; Armas Lindgren; Eliel Saarinen
- Founded: 1896
- Dissolved: 1905

Significant works and honors
- Buildings: Finnish pavilion at the 1900 Paris World Expo

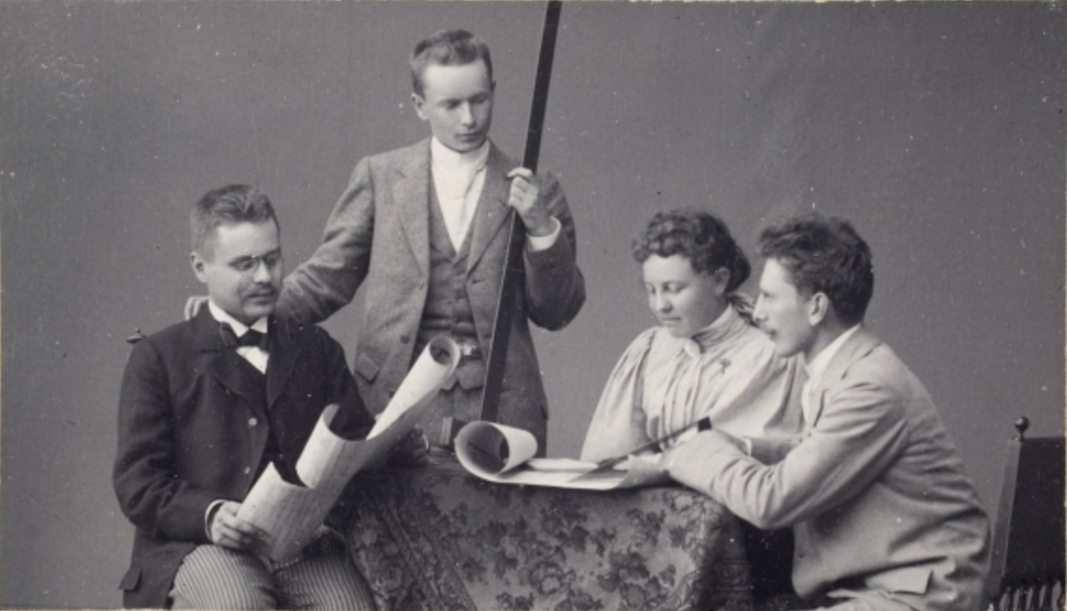
Armas Lindgren, Eliel Saarinen and Herman Gesellius in the late 1890s (with Albertina Östman)

Gesellius, Lindgren, Saarinen was a Finnish architecture firm, founded in Helsinki in 1896 by architects Herman Gesellius, Armas Lindgren and Eliel Saarinen.

They achieved international recognition with their design for the Finnish pavilion at the Paris World Expo in 1900, designed in the then prevailing Art Nouveau style. From 1901 to 1904, the three architects designed and built an extensive studio home for themselves and their families called Hvitträsk, in the rural community of Kirkkonummi by the Vitträsk lake. In 1905, the company ceased operations and the National Museum of Finland was their last work. Its construction was monitored by Lindgren alone.

== Major works ==
=== Finnish Pavilion at the Paris 1900 Exposition ===
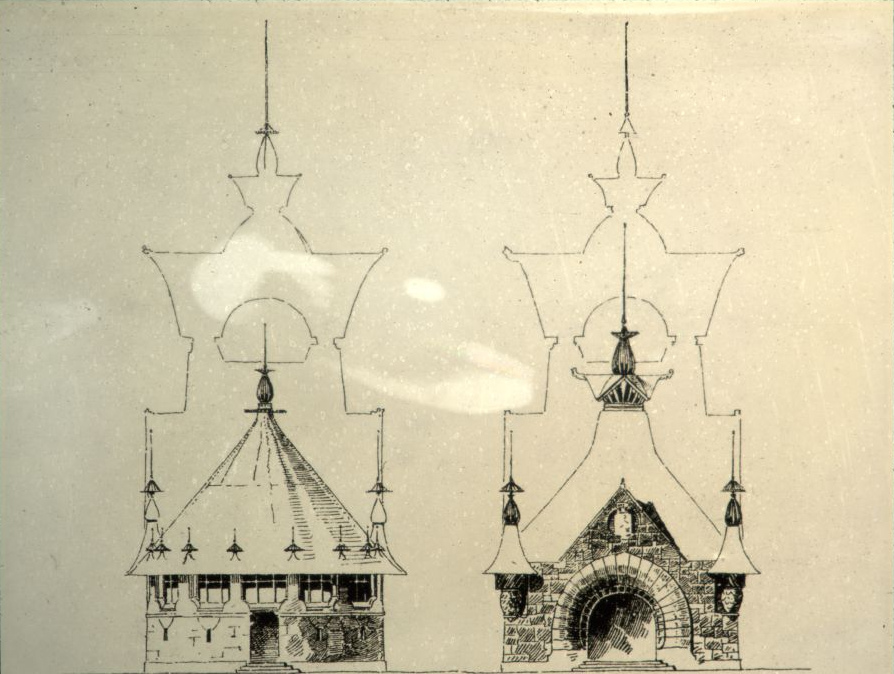
Design of the pavilion, 1898

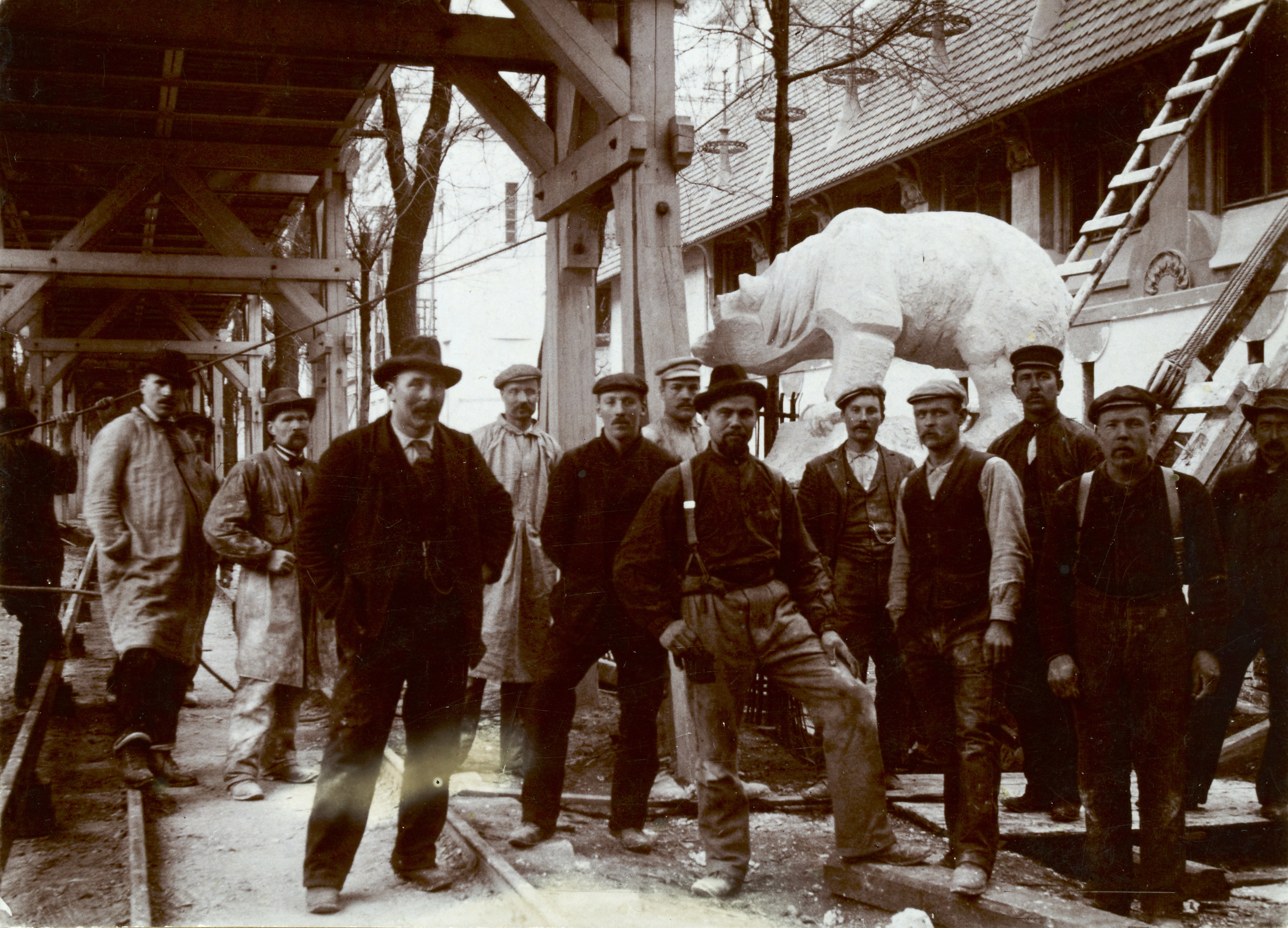
Construction workers

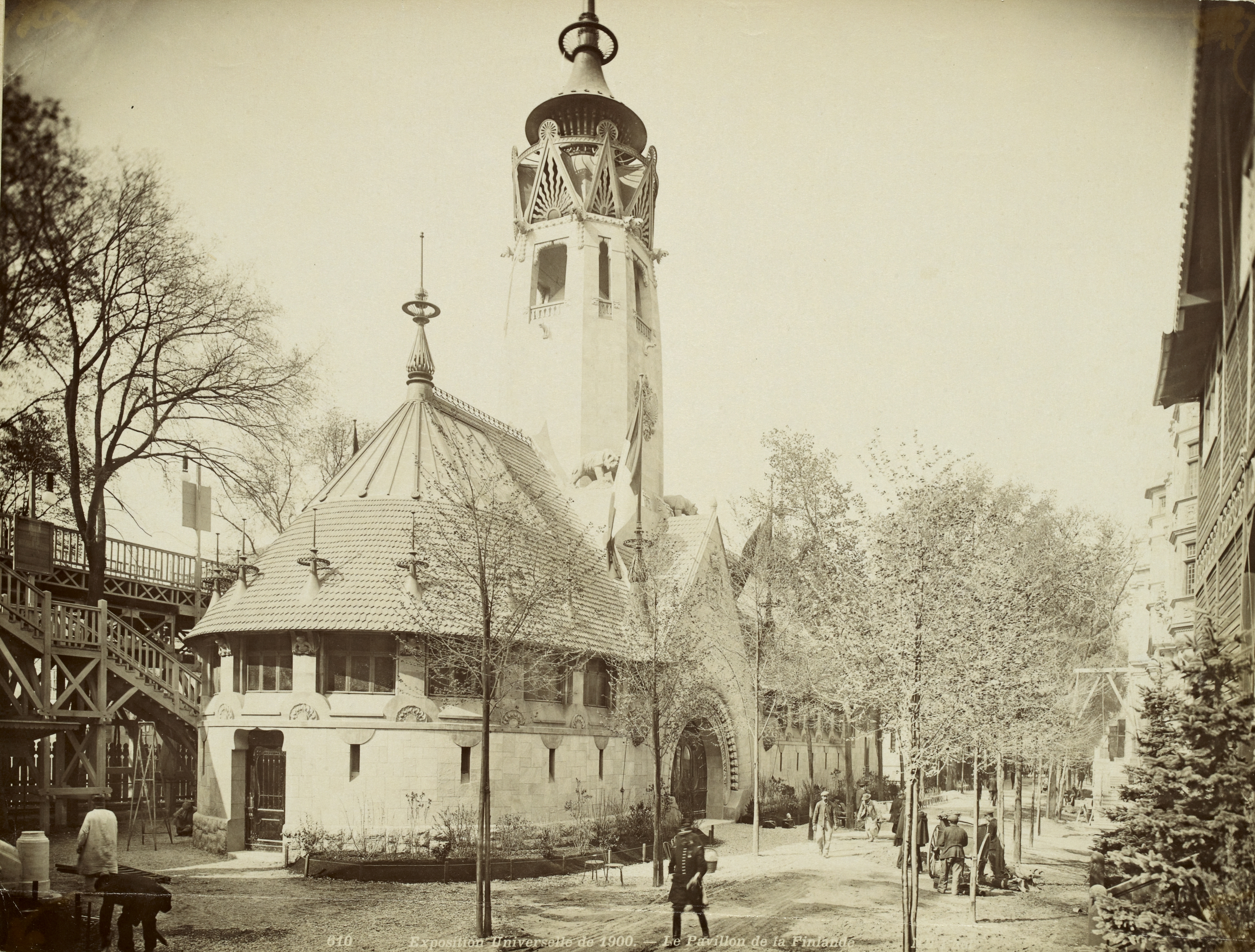
The pavilion at the exposition, 1900

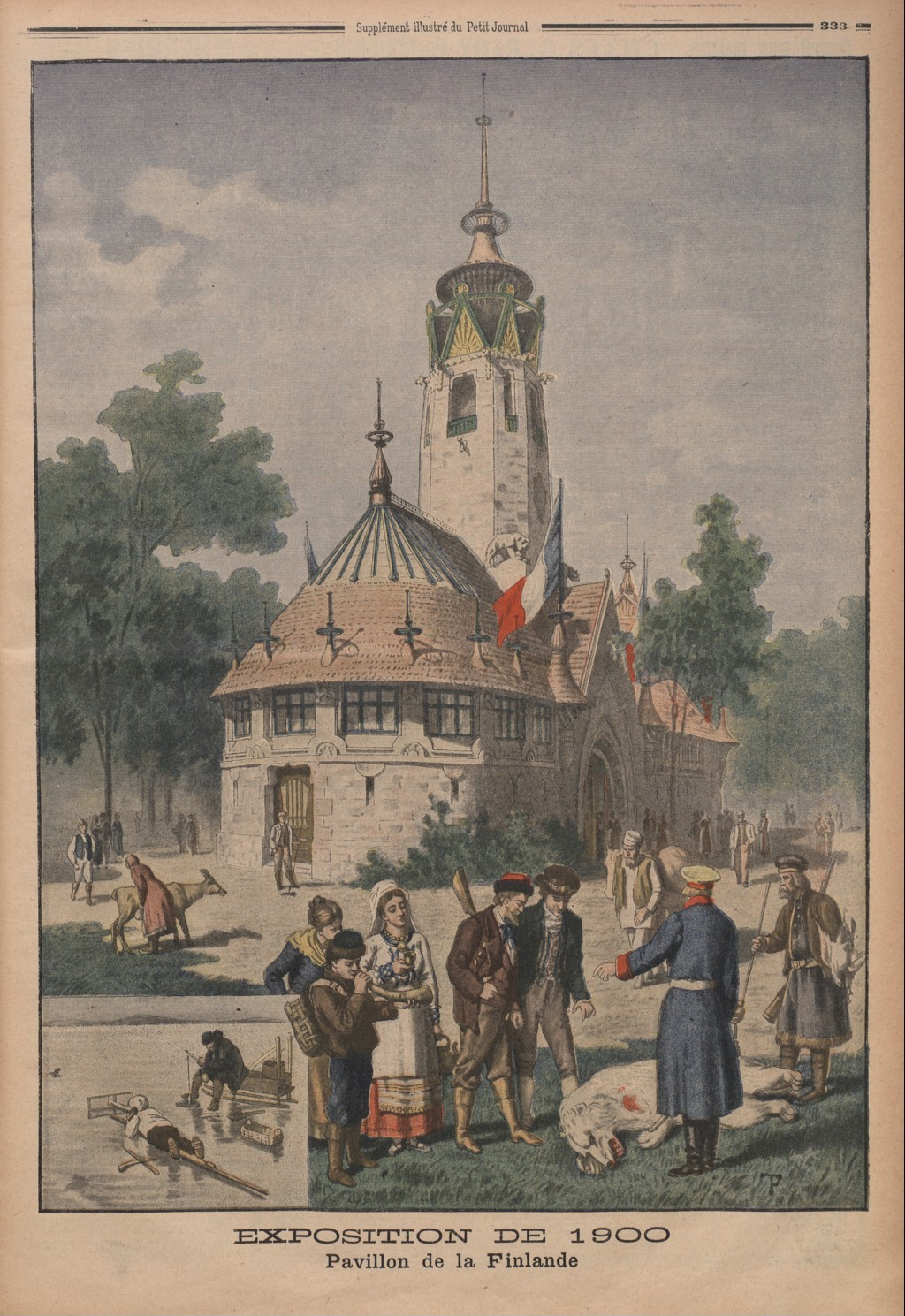
Drawing featured in the Le Petit Journal

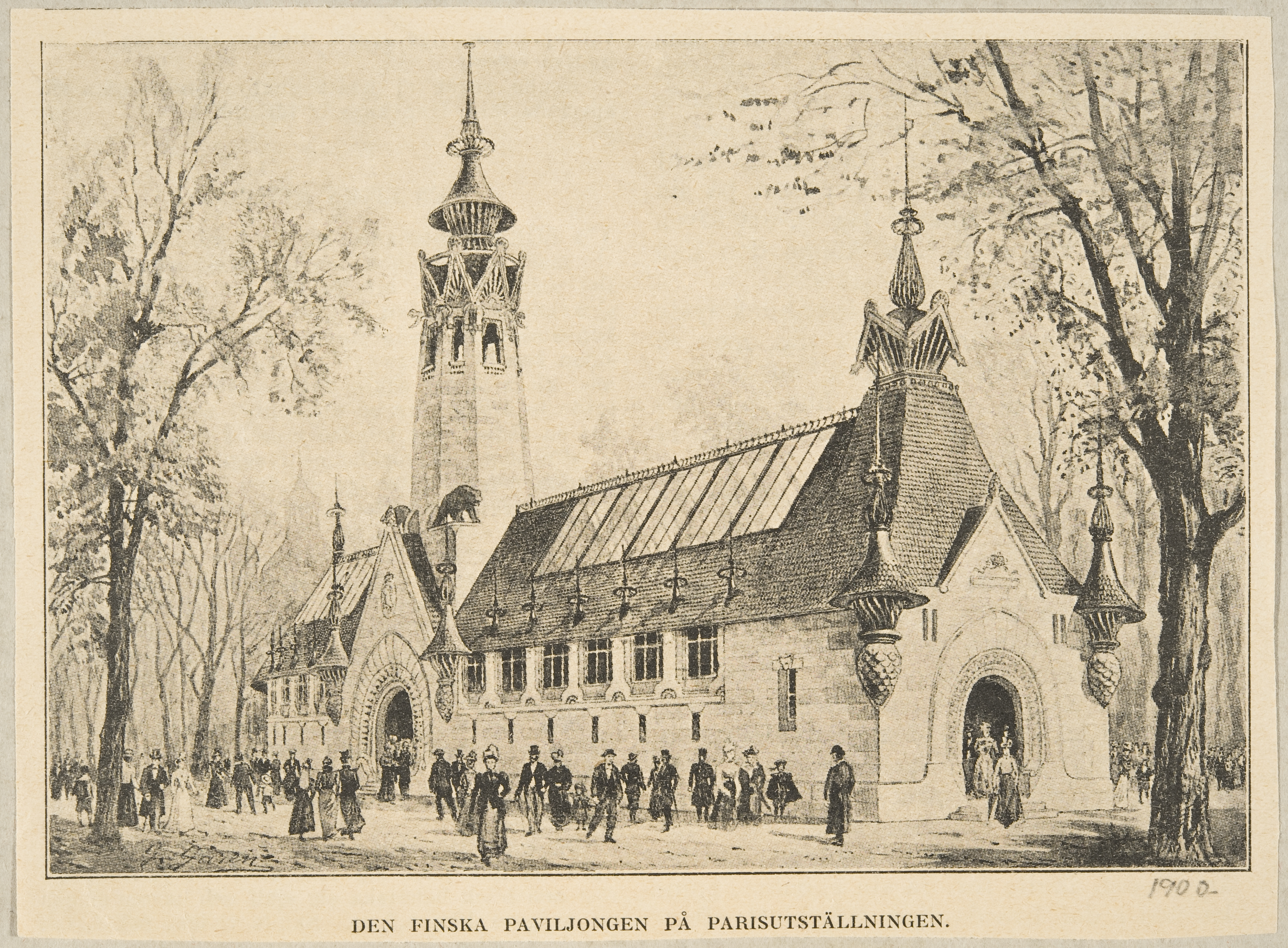
Drawing of the pavilion

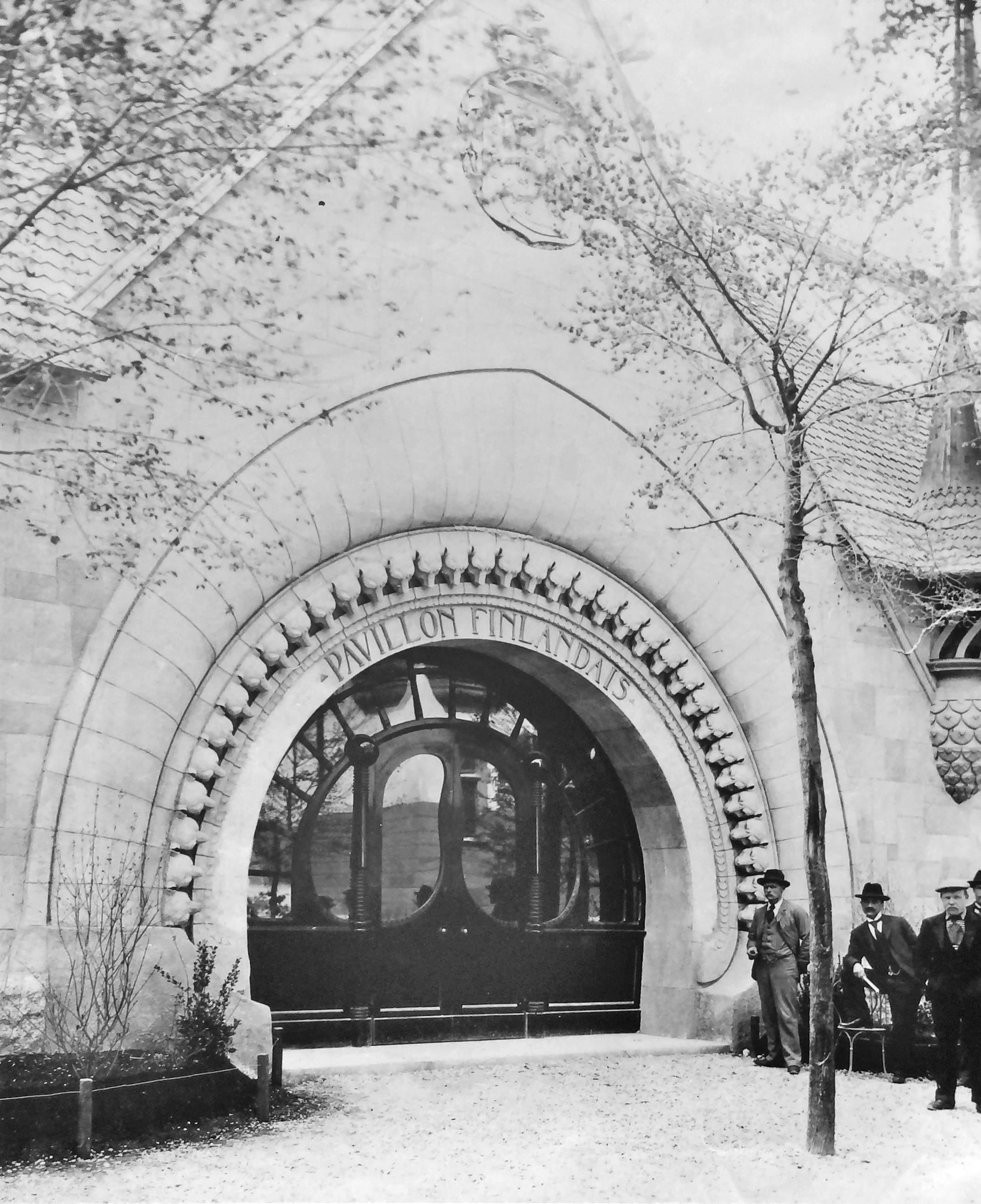
Entrance

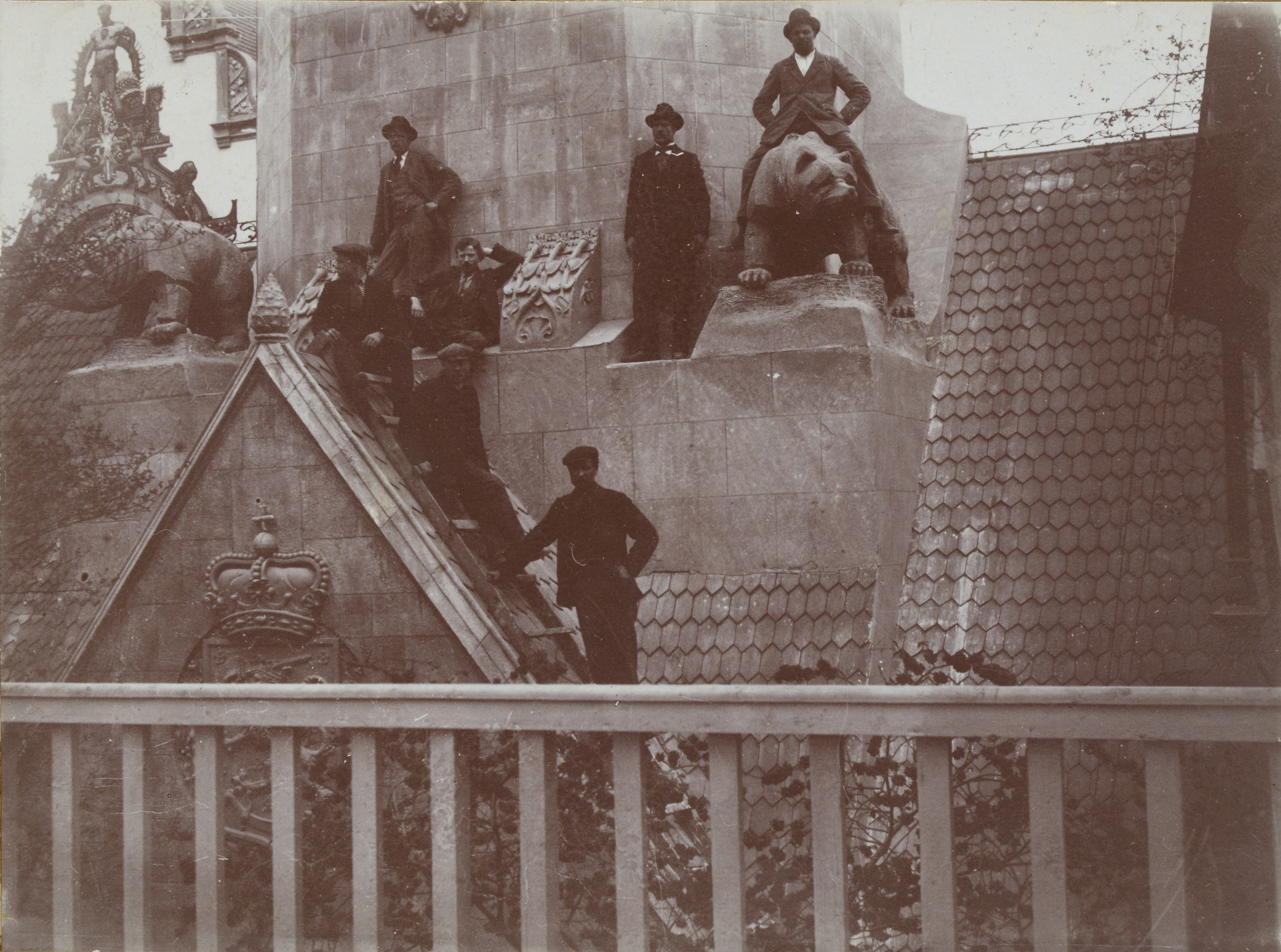
Finnish personnel on the roof, with bears by Emil Wikström

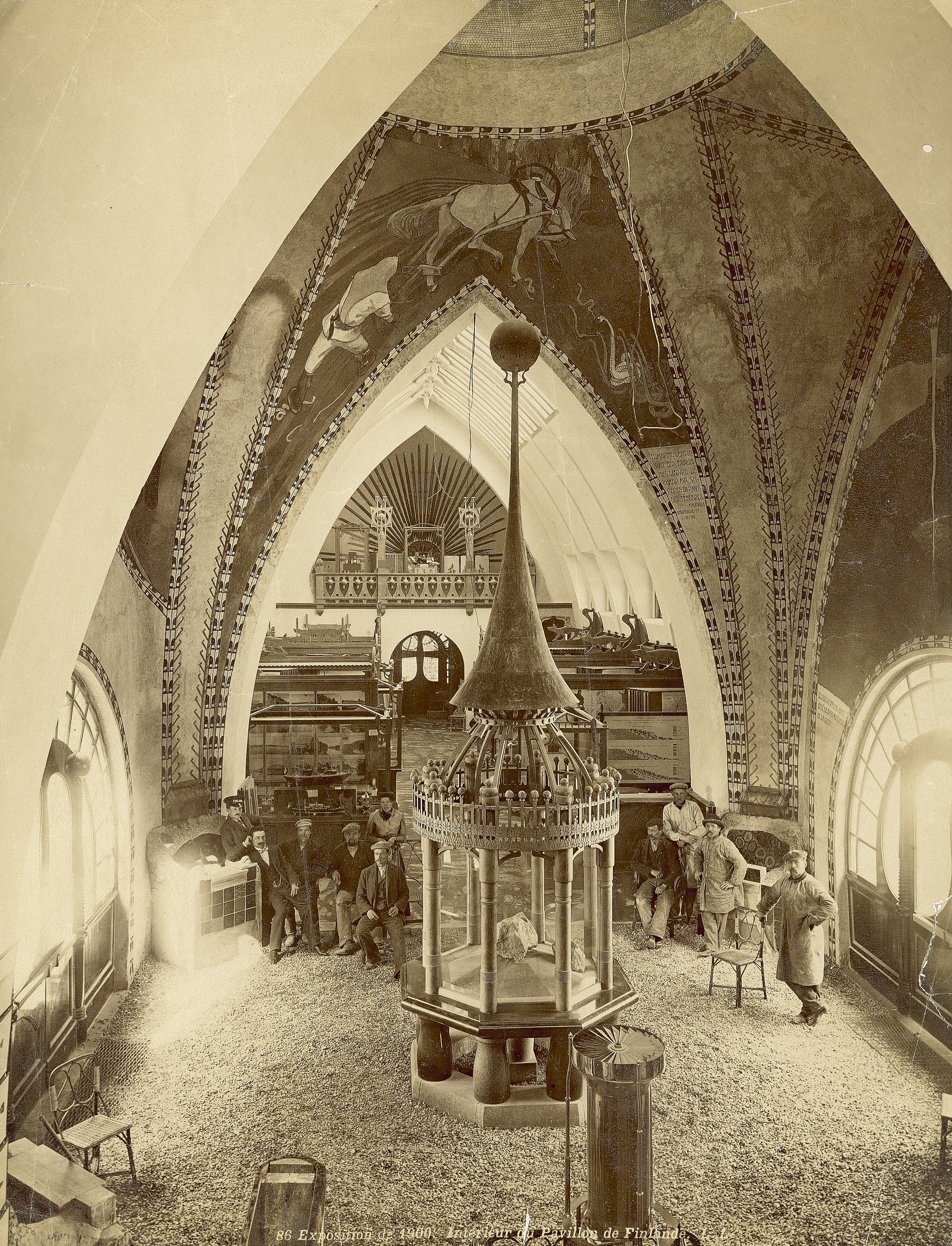
Interior with construction workers

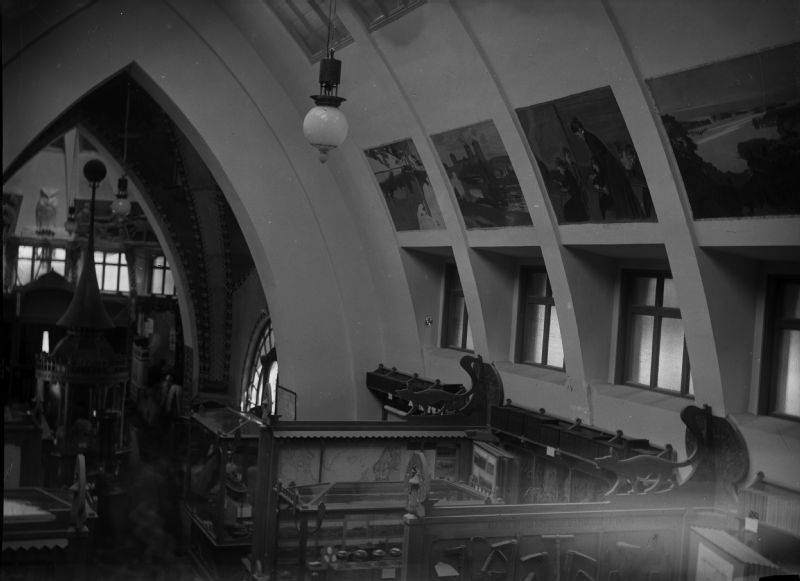
Paintings on the walls

=== Other works ===
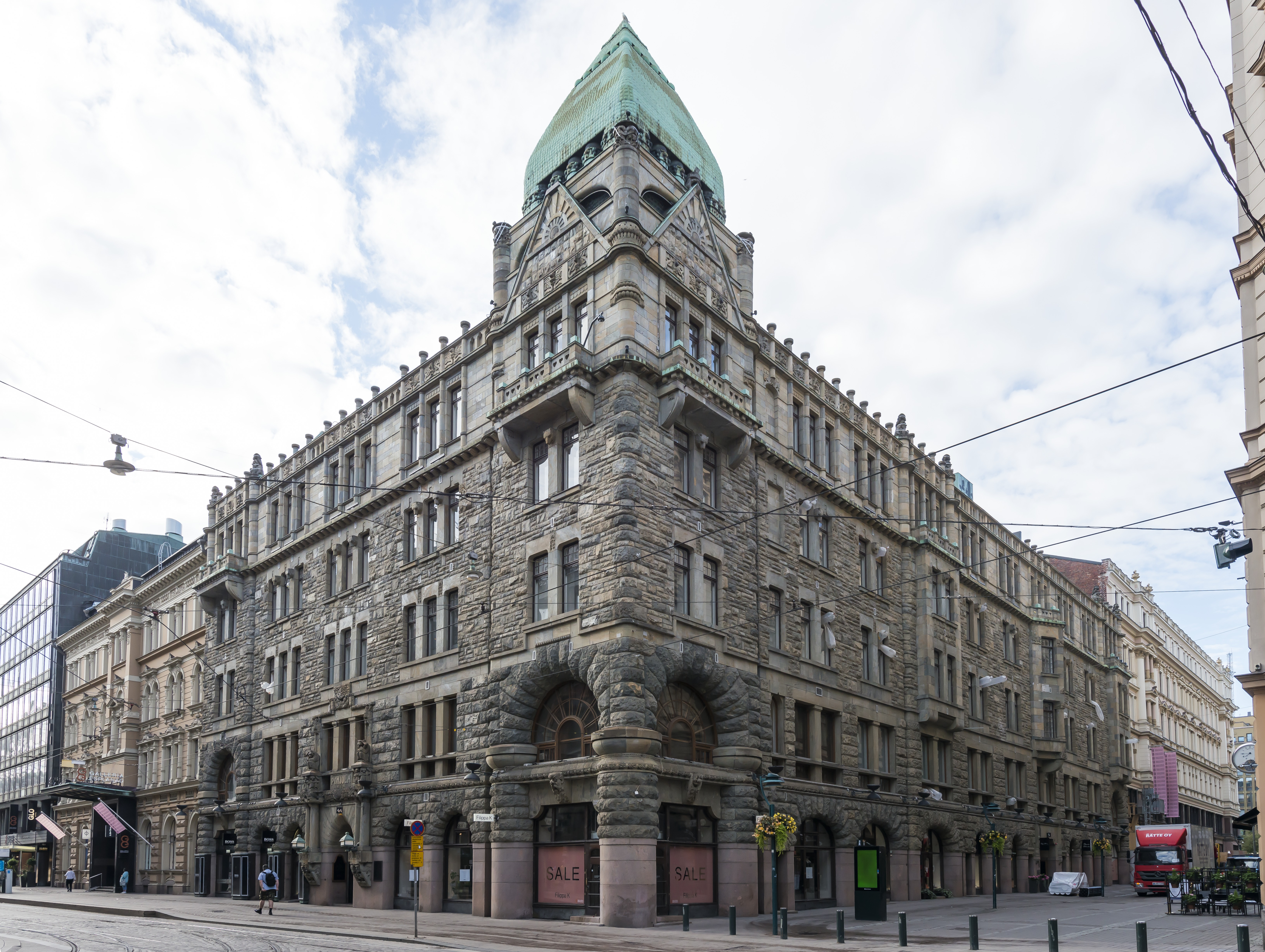
Pohjola Insurance building, 1900–1901

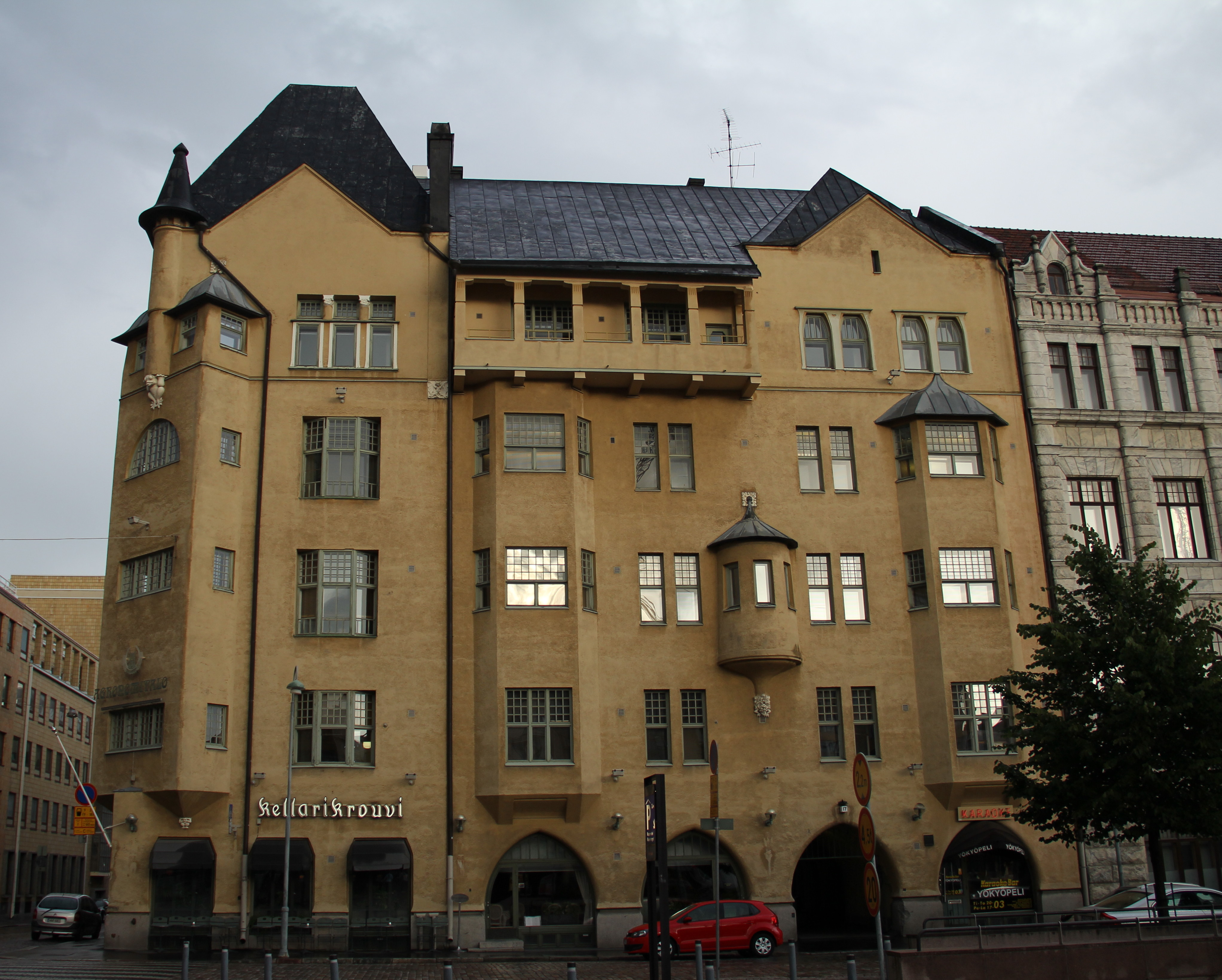
Fabianinkatu 17 (Agronomitalo), 1900–1901

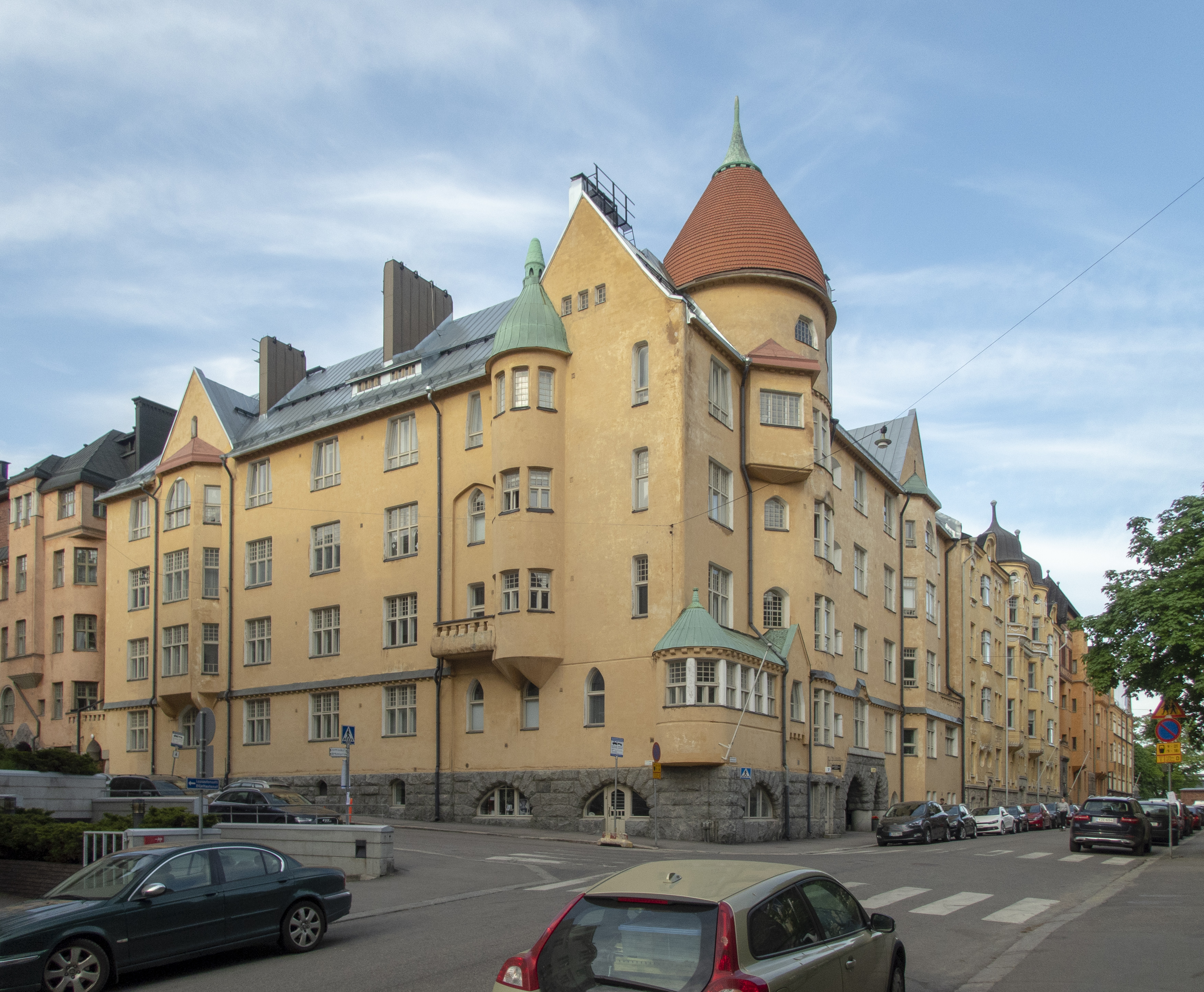
Olofsborg (apartment building) (Swedish for Olavinlinna, which the top resembles) at Katajanokankatu 1 / Kauppiaankatu 7, 1902

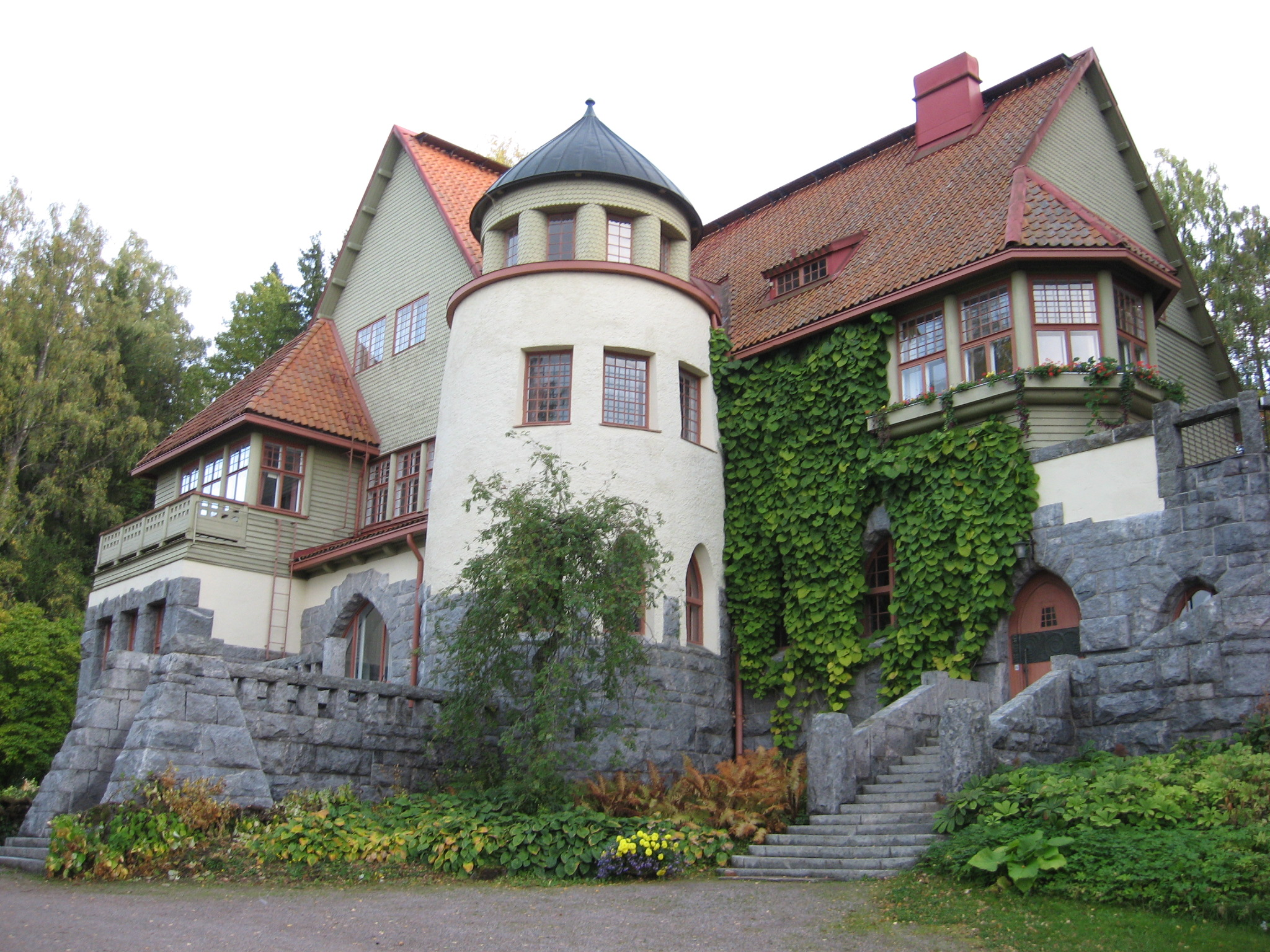
Hvittorp by Lake Vitträsk, 1901–1904

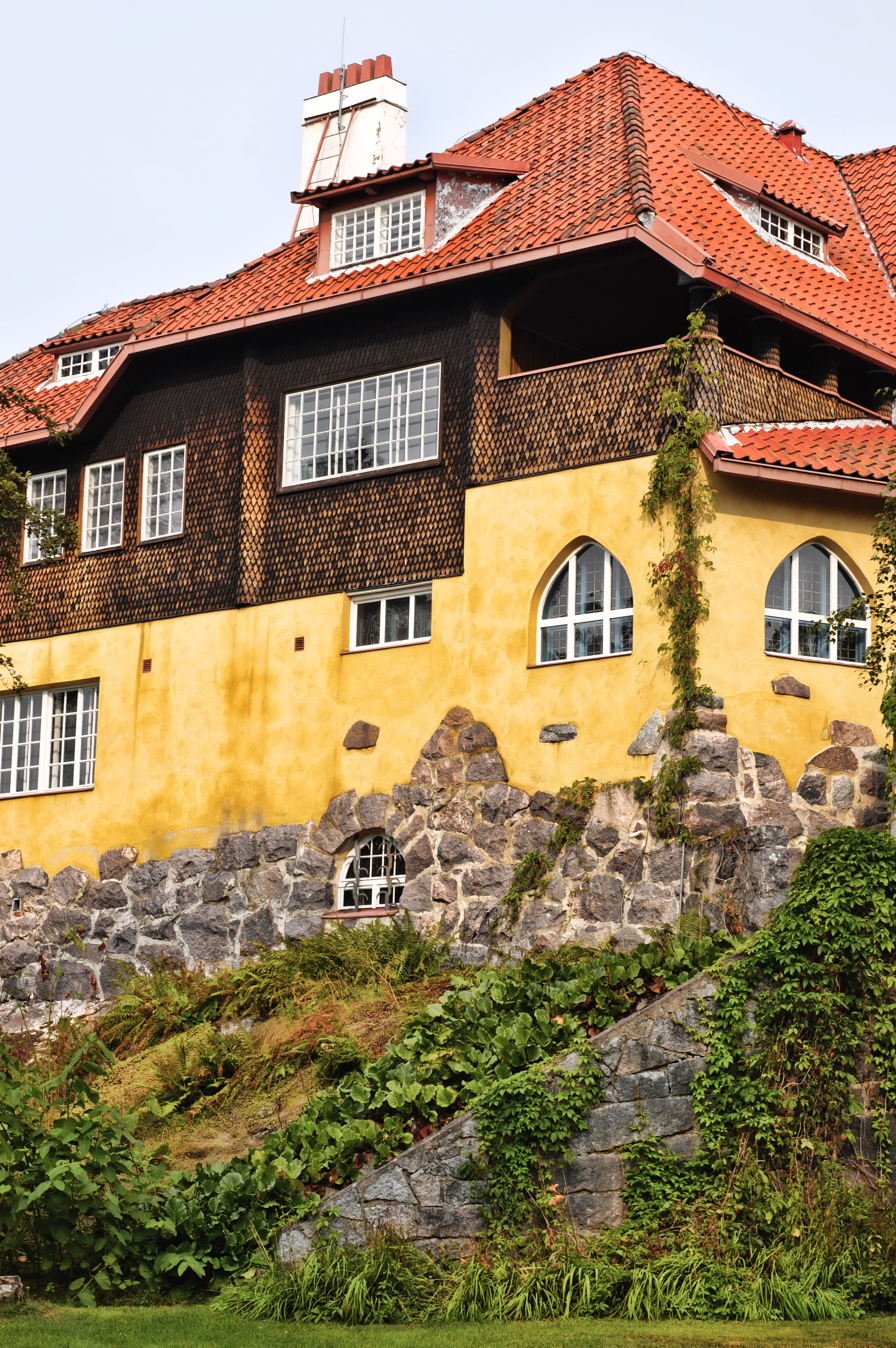
Hvitträsk: their own shared studio manor also by Lake Vitträsk, 1901–1903

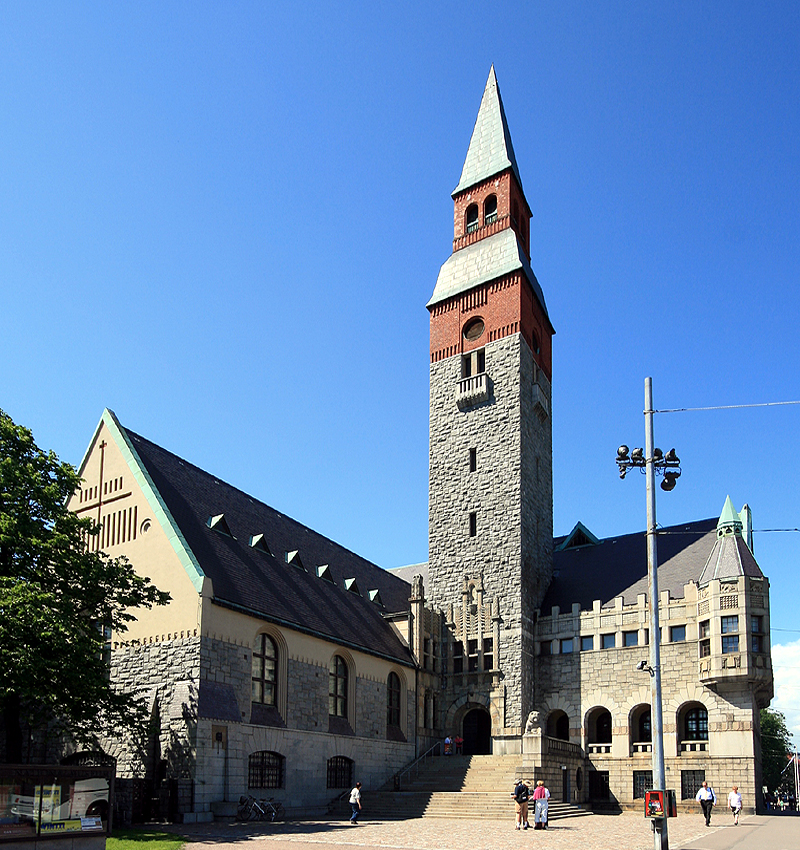
National Museum of Finland in Helsinki, 1905–1910
