= Wivi Lönn =

Finnish architect

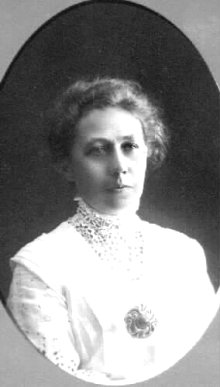
- Born: Olivia Mathilda Lönn; 20 May 1872; Tampere, Grand Duchy of Finland
- Died: 27 December 1966 (aged 94); Helsinki, Finland
- Occupation: Architect
- Awards: Architectural prize of School of Economics of Tampere, title of "Professor" by the Finnish Association of Architects
- Buildings: Estonia Theatre
- Projects: Uusi Ylioppilastalo
- Design: Sodankylä Geophysical Observatory

Wivi Lönn (20 May 1872 – 27 December 1966), born as Olivia Mathilda Lönn, was a Finnish architect. She was the first woman to be awarded the honorary title of "Professor" by the Finnish Association of Architects.

== Early life and education ==
Olivia (Wivi) Mathilda Lönn was born in Tampere on 20 May 1872. Her father was Wilhelm Lönn, a brewmaster, and her mother Mathilda Siren. The father died when Wivi Lönn was 16.

Wivi Lönn got the special permission to enter the Industrial School of Tampere where she studied to become a master builder as an only woman in her class. After being the best in her class she got recommendations to study architecture. From 1893 to 1896, she studied architecture at the Polytechnic University of Helsinki, again with a special permission. During the same period, she won first prizes in several architectural competitions. She was the fourth female architect in Finland, and the first one to establish her own architectural office.

== Later career ==
Wivi Lönn's graduation from the university was followed by establishing her architectural office, making her the first independently practising female architect of Finland. In 1904, she won the first architectural prize in a contest of the mercantile school of Tampere. From 1909 to 1913, Wivi Lönn and Armas Lindgren designed and built the Estonia Theatre in the Art Nouveau style, and the Uusi Ylioppilastalo in Helsinki. Wivi Lönn specialized in renewing and designing school buildings but as a hard worker, she designed a wide variety of buildings. In 1913 she moved to Jyväskylä where she run several architectural projects, among them a school, a factory, and several private buildings.

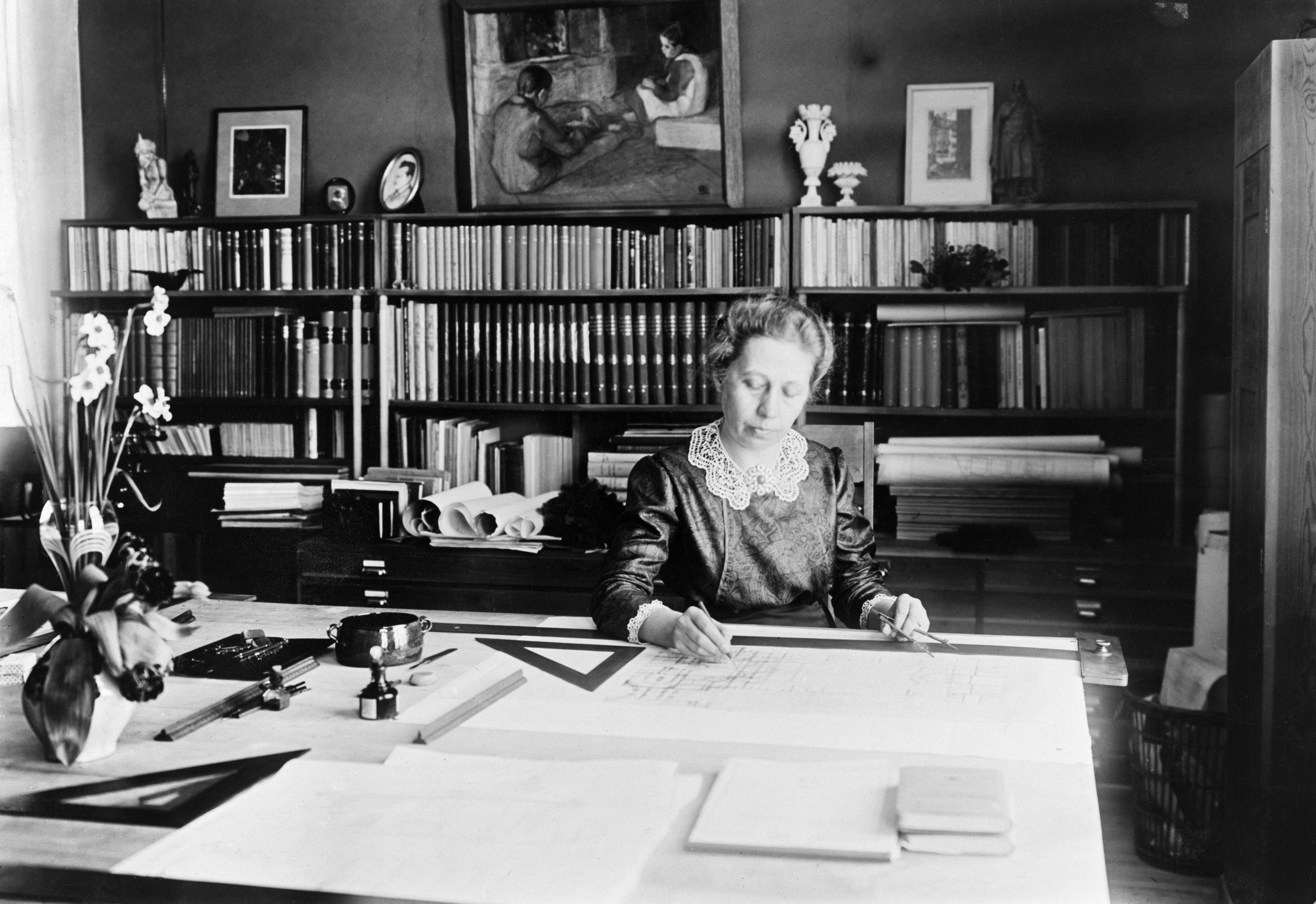
Lönn working on a design in her home in Jyväskylä.

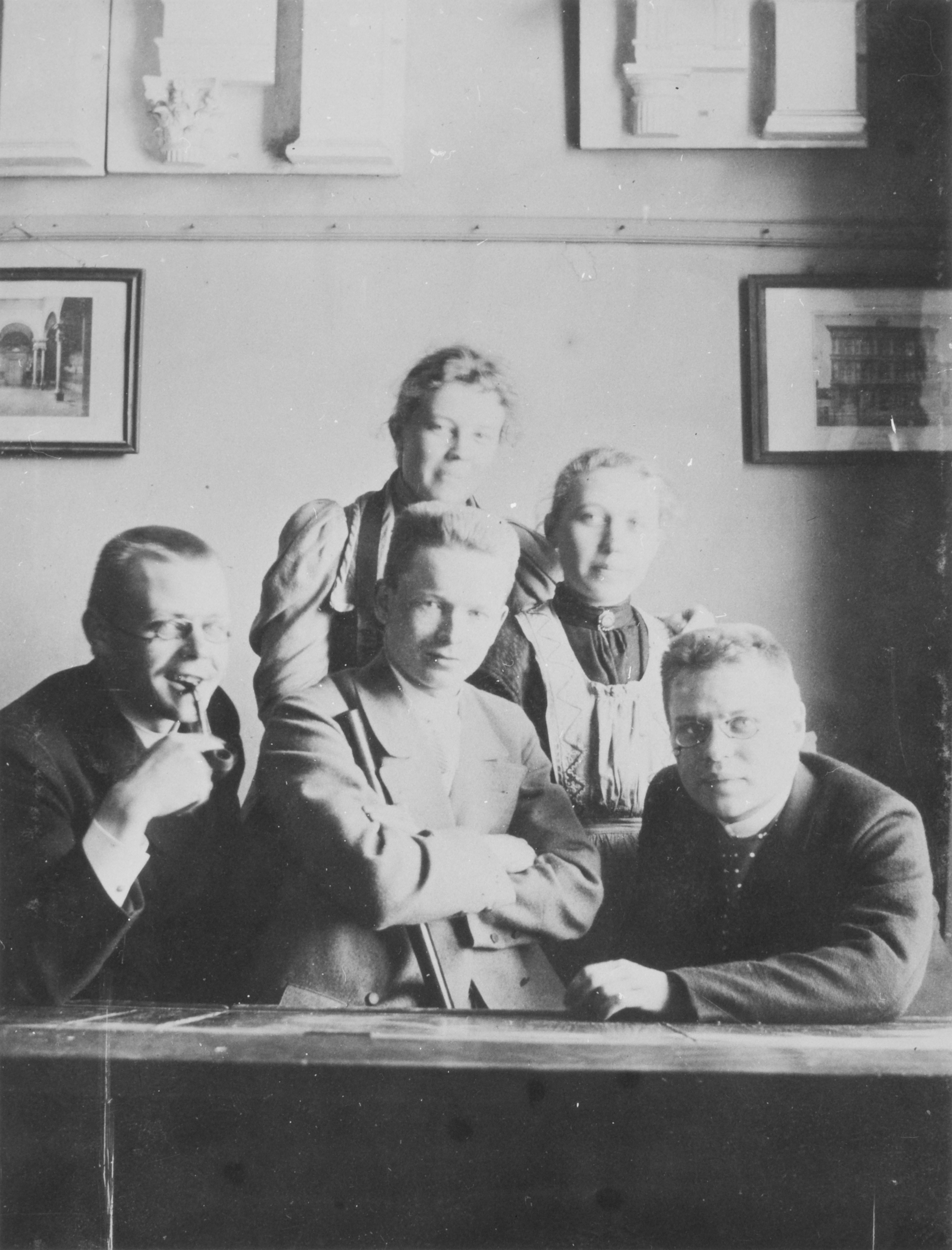
Students of architecture: Lönn top right, with clockwise Armas Lindgren, Eliel Saarinen, Torsten Montell and Albertina Östman, 1896.

In Jyväskylä Wivi Lönn befriended herself with a wealthy business woman Hanna Parviainen who commissioned several architectural projects in the Jyväskylä Region, especially on the Island of Säynätsalo. Hanna Parviainen and Wivi Lönn made several trips together and visited many European countries together.

After Hanna Parviainen had to sell her businesses due to the recession she moved to Helsinki. She paid for and Wivi Lönn designed the headquarters of the Young Women's Christian Association (YWCA) in Helsinki. Wivi Lönn moved there in 1927 to live with Hanna Parviainen till her death in 1938.

Wivi Lönn has been seen an example for many Finnish female architects. In 1942, 46 Finnish women architects gathered together in Helsinki on Lönn's 70th birthday and founded Architecta, the Finnish Association of Women Architects. Wivi Lönn became the honorary member of Architecta in 1952. In 1957 she was awarded the medal of Architecta made to honor her.

In 1956, Wivi Lönn became the first woman to be awarded the honorary title of the "Professor" by SAFA, the Finnish Association of Architects.

Wivi Lönn died on 27 December 1966 in Helsinki. She is buried in her home town Tampere in the Kalevankangas Cemetery.

In 2010, sculptor Sonja Vectomov unveiled a statue of Lönn in the garden of Lönn's former home in Jyväskylä.

== Notable buildings ==
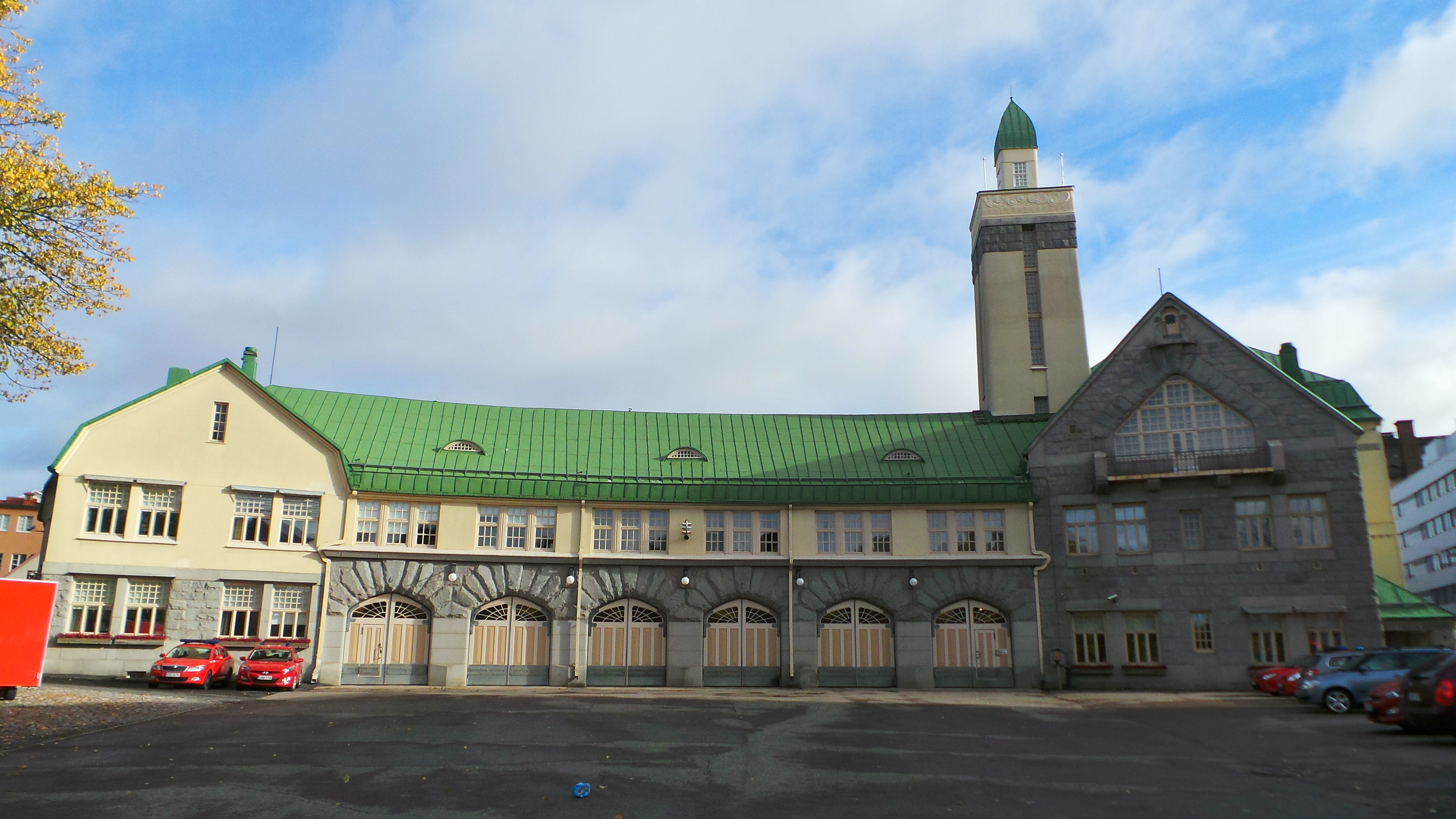
Tampere Central Fire Station, 1908.

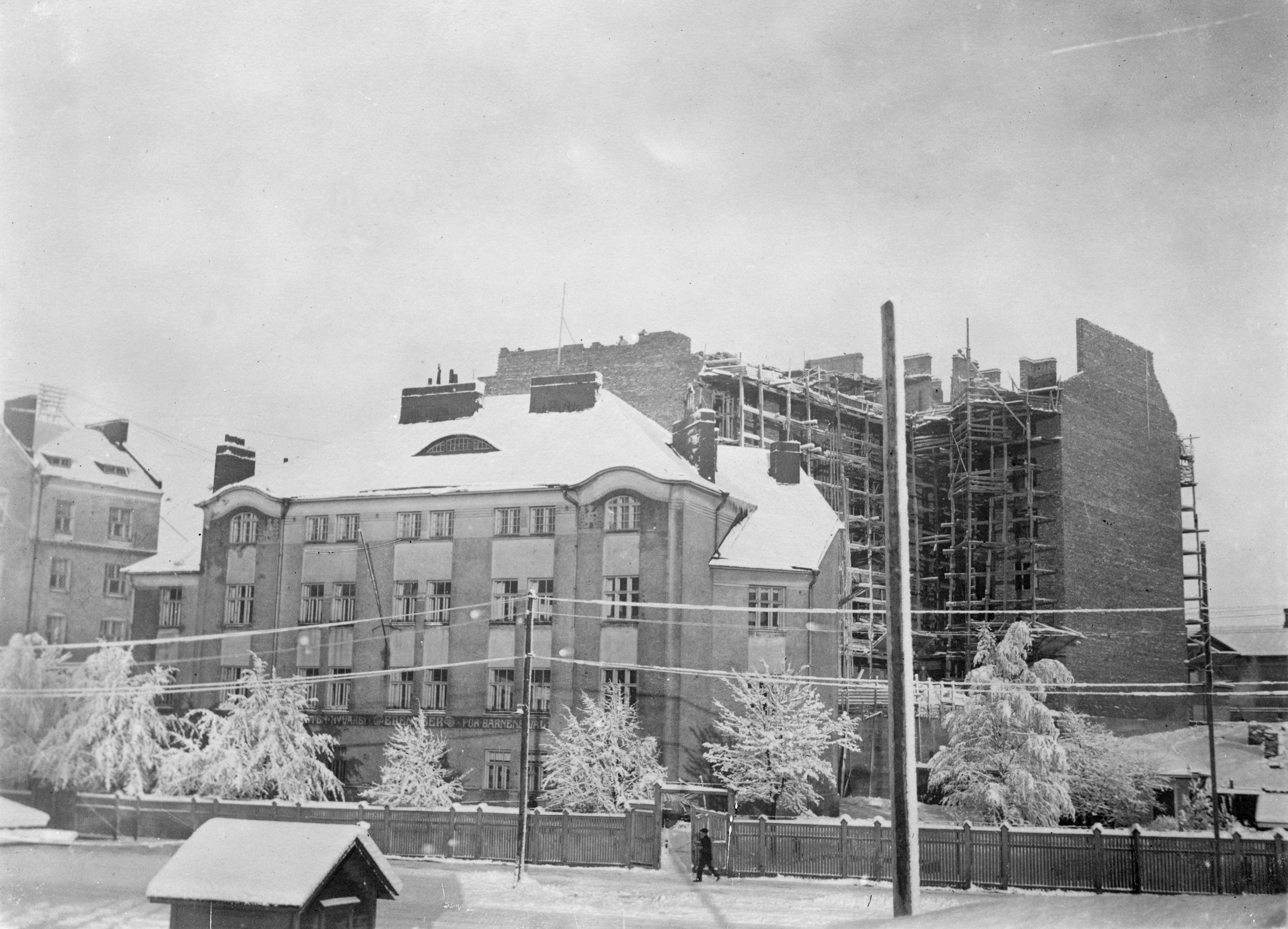
Ebeneser kindergarten, Helsinki, 1908.

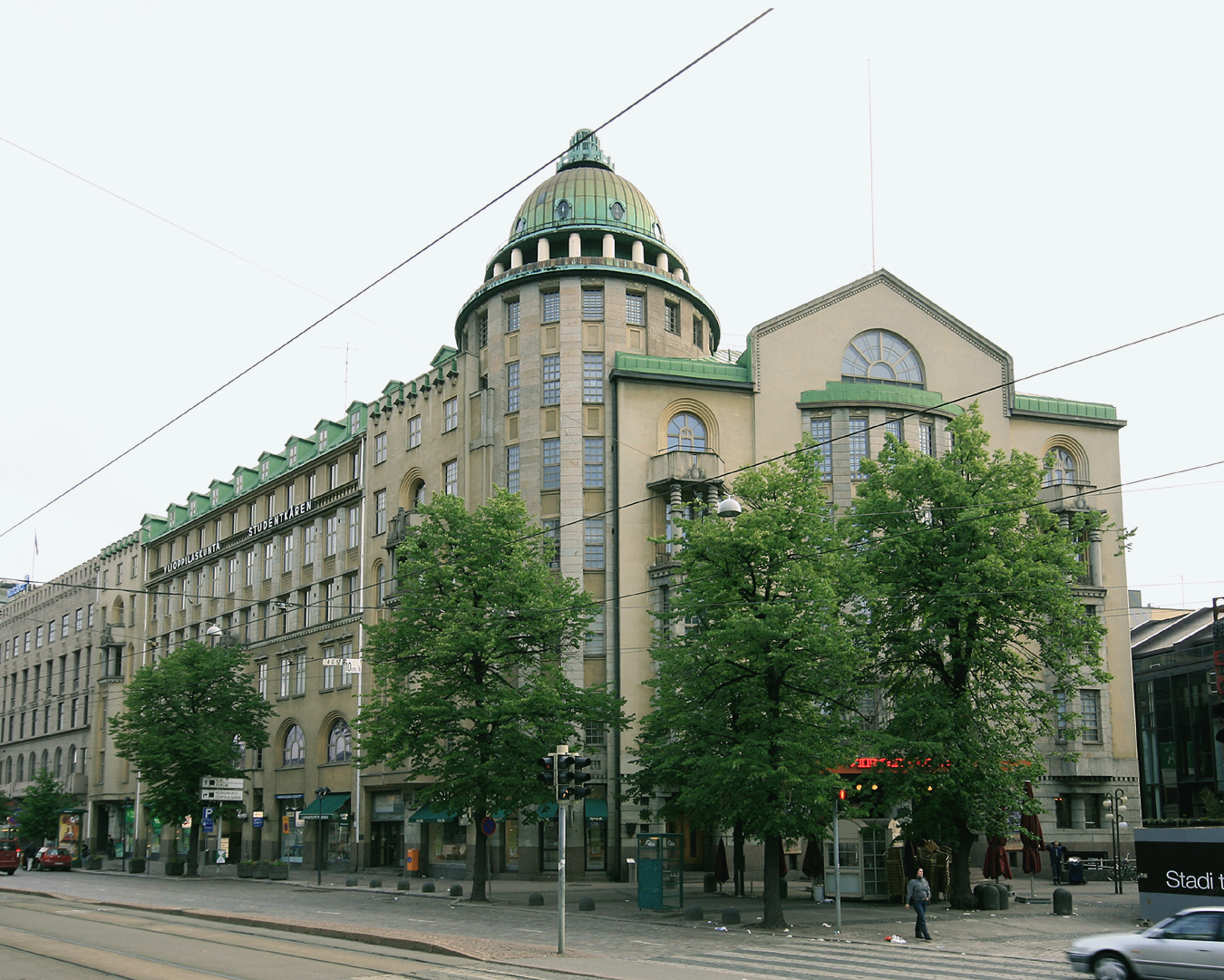
Uusi Ylioppilastalo (The New Student House), 1910.

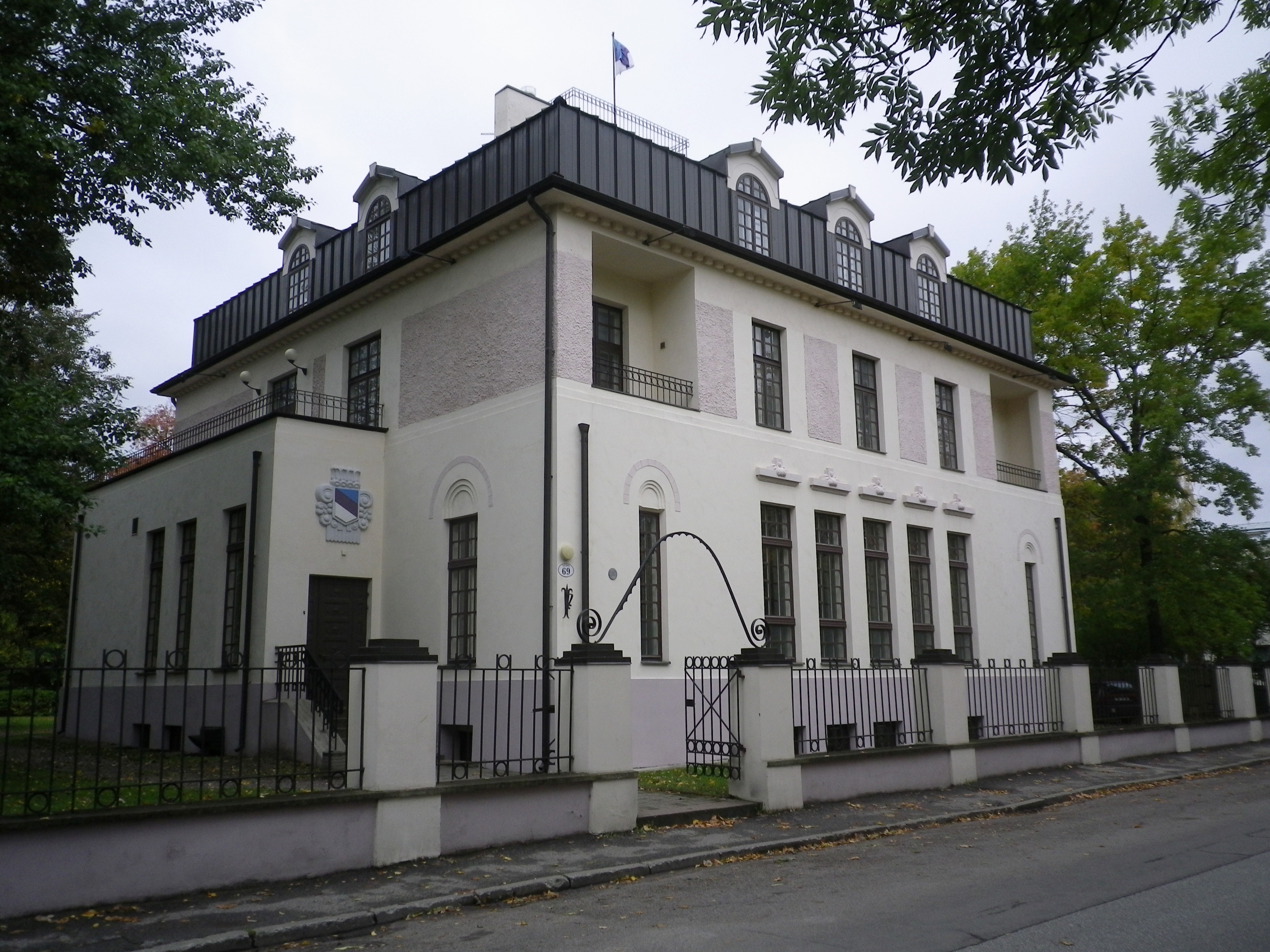
Korp! Sakala convent, 1911, hit by a flame bomb in 1941 that left only the walls standing, renovated heavily afterwards.

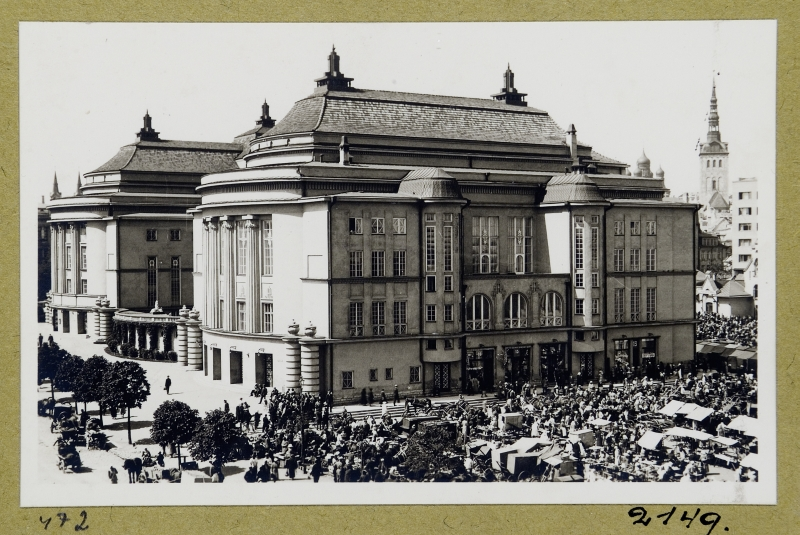
The original Estonia Theatre in Tallinn, designed together with Armas Lindgren, 1913 (later heavily damaged during, and rebuilt after, World War II)

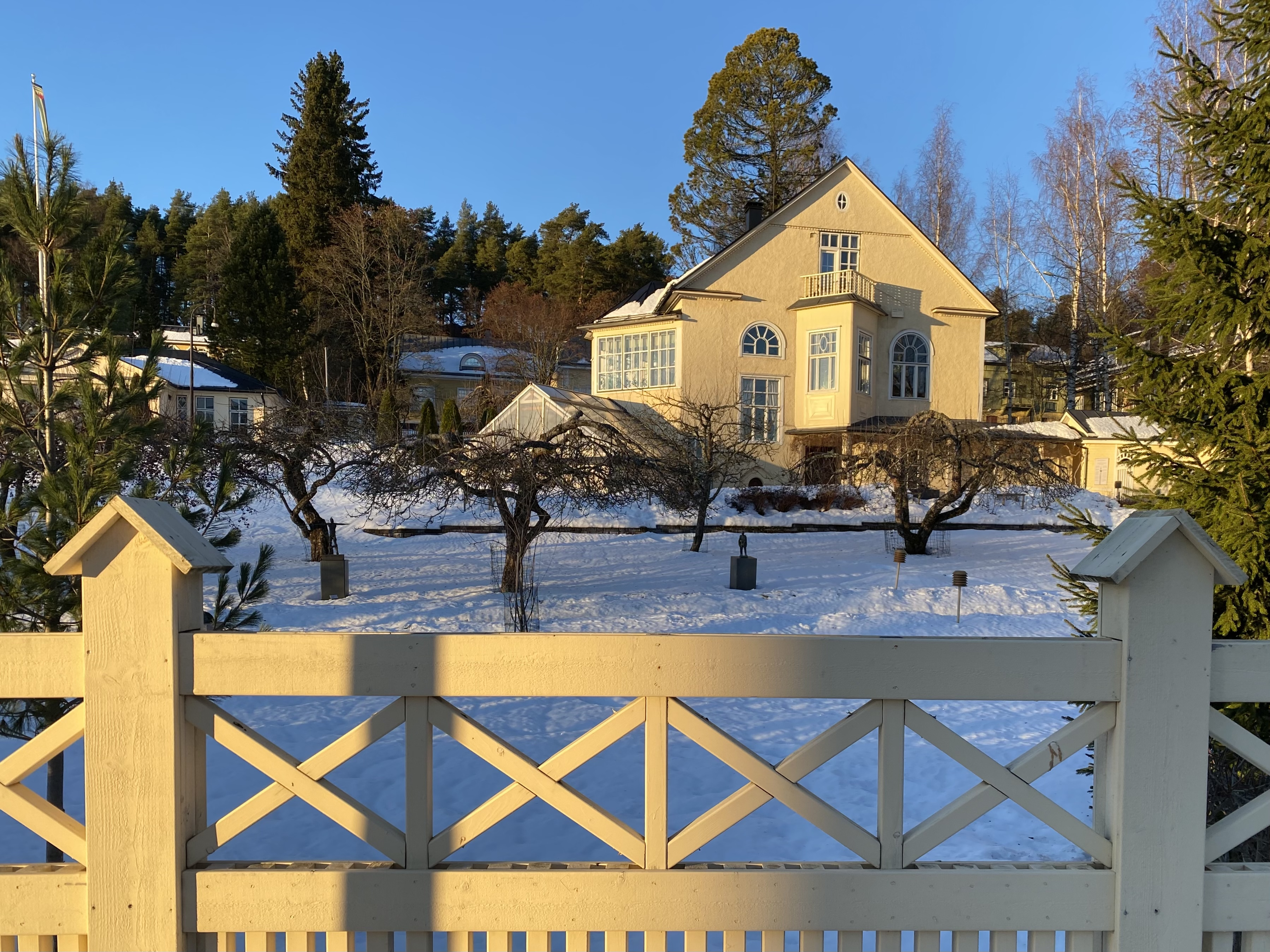
House of Wivi Lönn in Jyväskylä, 1911

== See also ==
- Women in architecture
