= Estonia Theatre =

Theatre building in Tallinn, Estonia

Coordinates: 59°26′05″N 24°45′03″E

The Estonia Theatre building (the south facade, 2022)

Estonia Theatre is an historic landmark building in central Tallinn, the capital city of Estonia. It houses the Estonian National Opera and the Estonian National Symphony Orchestra.

The original Estonia Theatre building was designed in Jugendstil by Finnish architects Armas Lindgren and Wivi Lönn, and constructed between 1911 and 1913 on the initiative of the Estonia Society, with popular effort and widespread financial support from the Estonian people. The Estonia Theatre was opened to the general public on 24 August 1913. At the time, it was the largest building in Tallinn.

After the Republic of Estonia had become an independent country in 1918, the Estonia Theatre building was the main venue of the newly elected Estonian Constituent Assembly in April 1919. The Assembly disbanded itself after following parliamentary elections, in December 1920.

The theatre building was extensively damaged by fire caused by incendiary bombs in the 9-10 March 1944 Soviet aerial bombing raid on Tallinn. When reconstructed during the post-World War II Soviet occupation of Estonia, the southern facade was retained but the overall reconstruction was in a more classical style, with additional elements of Stalinist architecture. It reopened to the public in 1947. Starting from 1946, the building also housed the premises of the newly created Tallinn Ballet School.

In March 1990, during the period of nonviolent resistance to the Soviet rule, the Estonia Theatre building became the site of the newly elected grassroots parliament, the Congress of Estonia. The Congress disbanded itself after the independent Republic of Estonia had been restored in 1991, when a new parliament had been elected in September 1992.

The building now has two large auditoriums in two separate wings. A Concert Hall is located in one wing of the building. The Concert Hall was entirely renovated in 1997. A separate, smaller chamber hall was reconstructed and opened to the public in 2006.

== Gallery ==
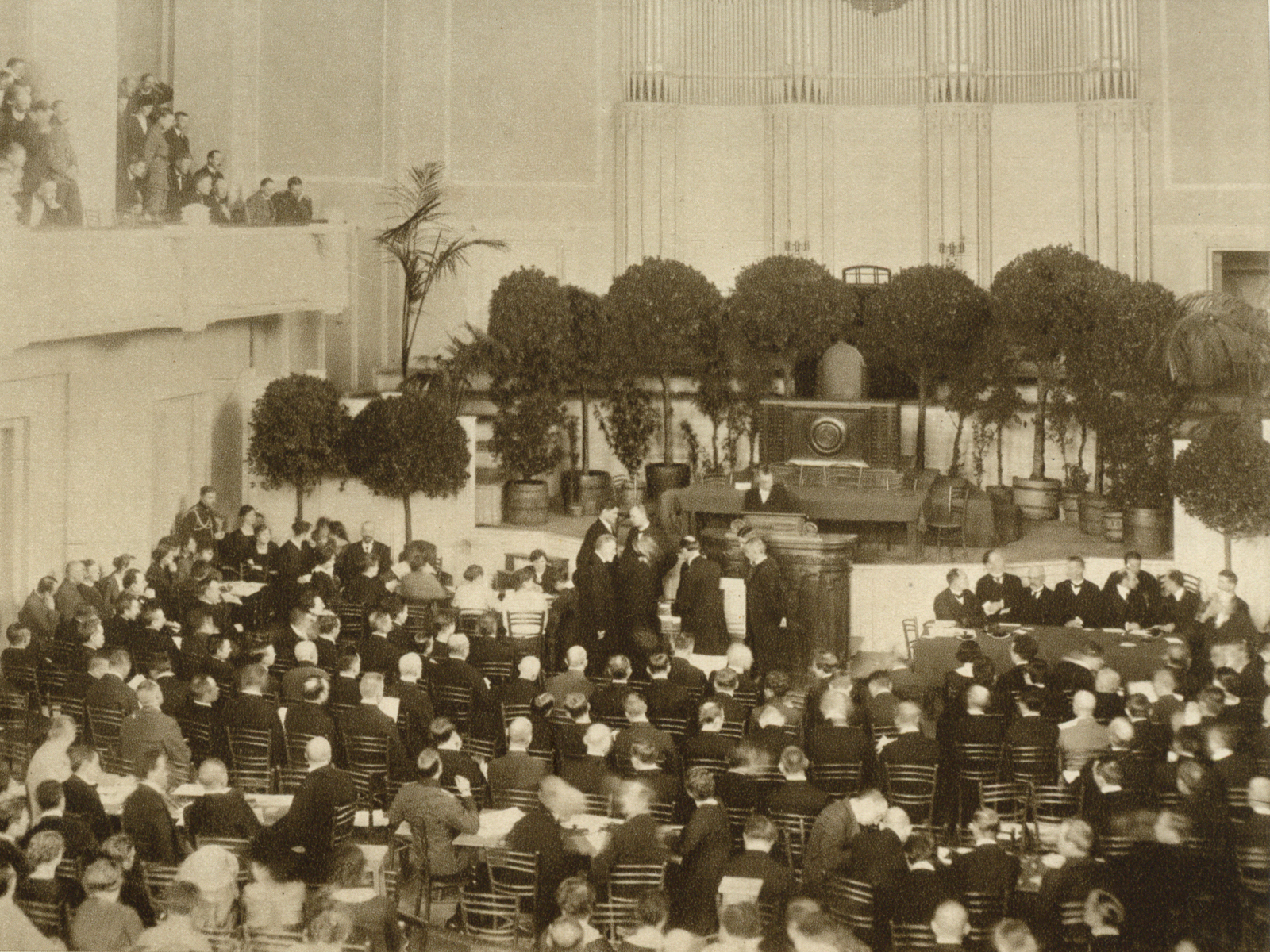
Opening session of the Estonian Constituent Assembly in the Estonia Theatre, 23 April 1919

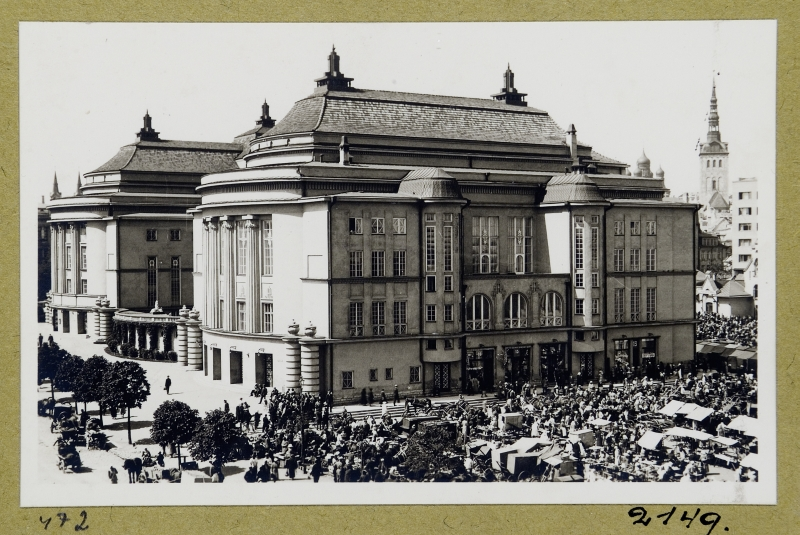
The original Estonia theatre building, c. 1920

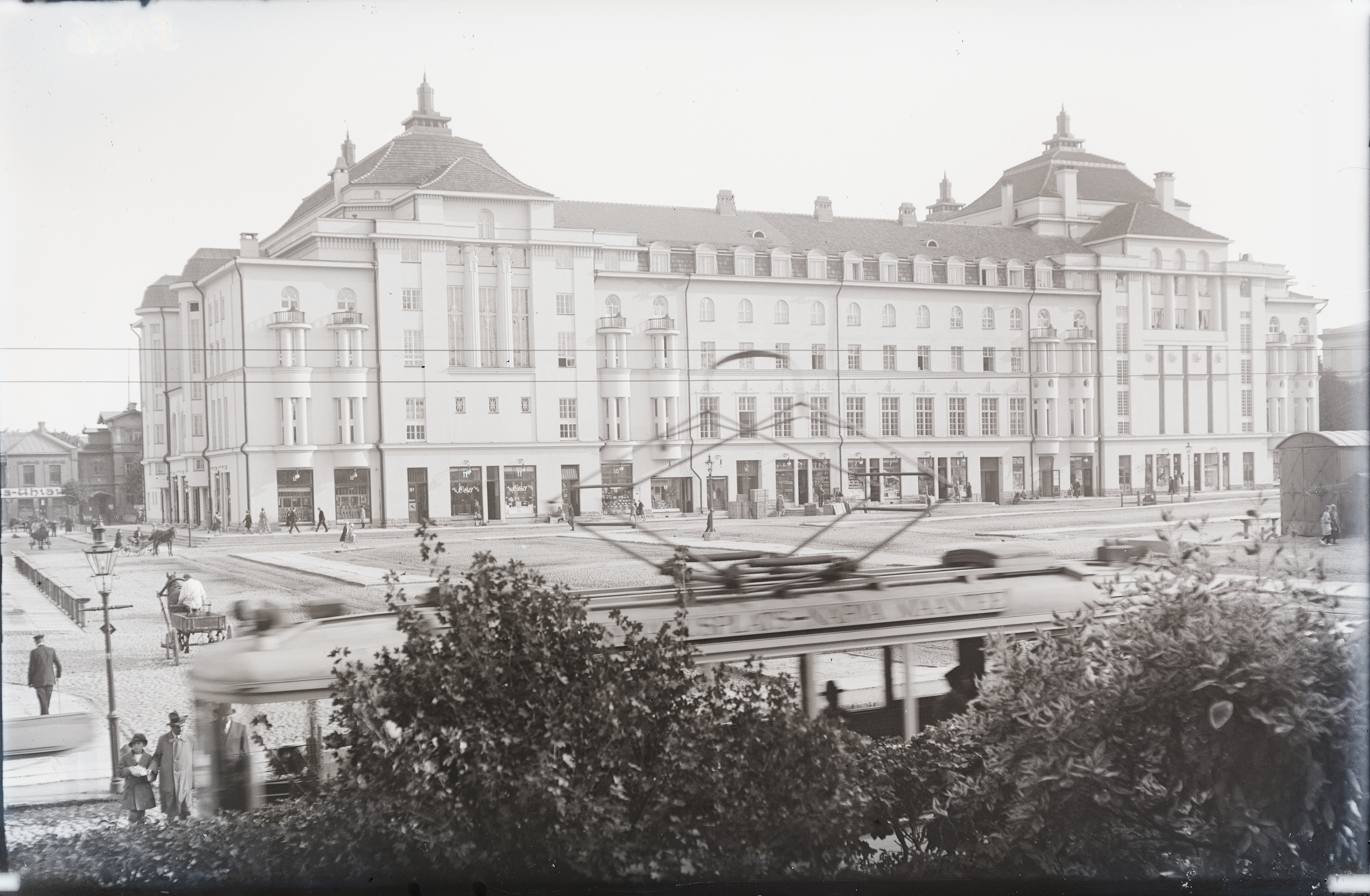
View of the theatre building from north, c. 1930

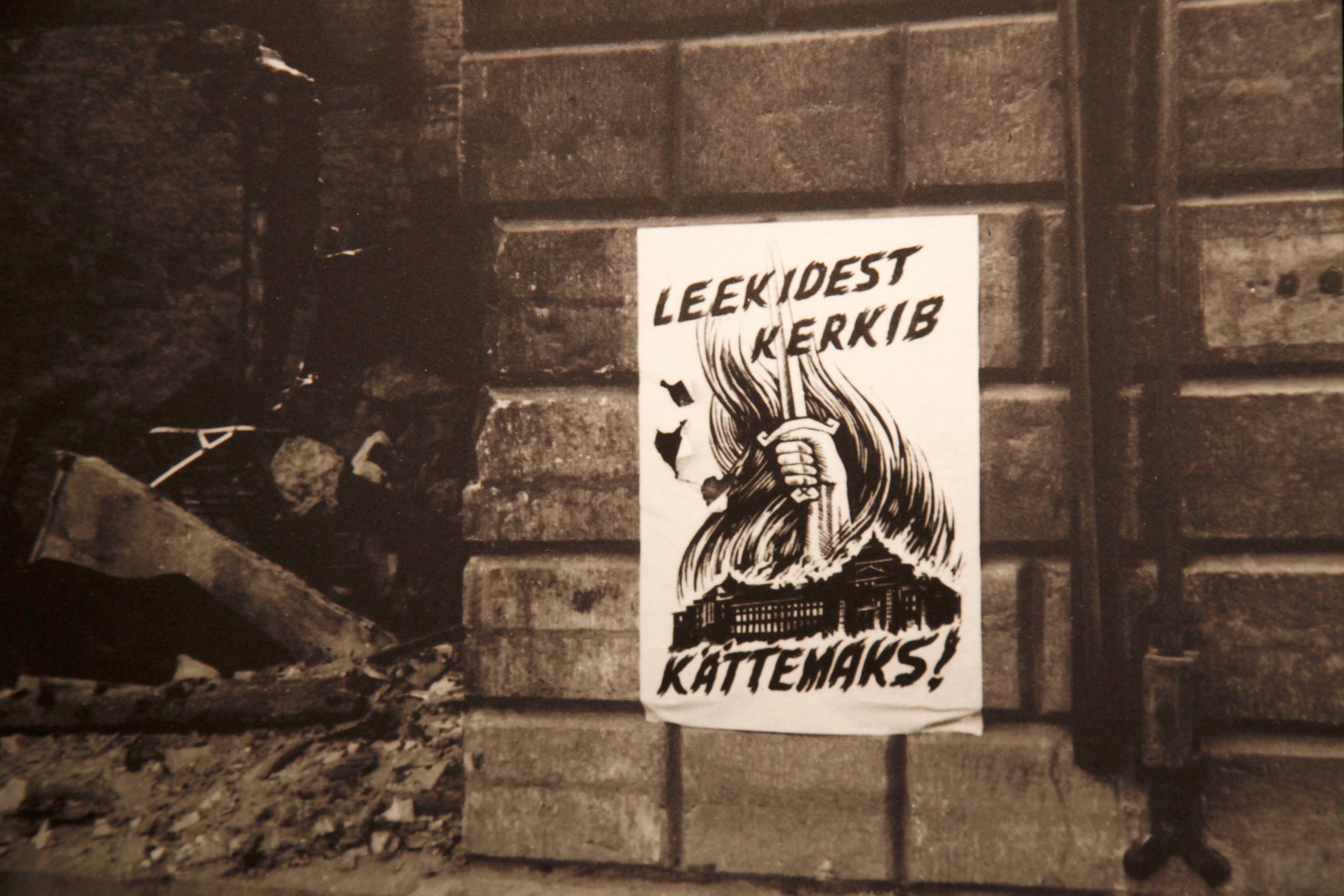
A wartime anti-Soviet leaflet depicting the Estonia Theatre after the 1944 bombing ("Vengeance Will Rise from the Flames!")

The Estonia Theatre building in 2015

== See also ==
- Estonian Drama Theatre
