= Armas Lindgren =

Finnish architect (1874-1929)

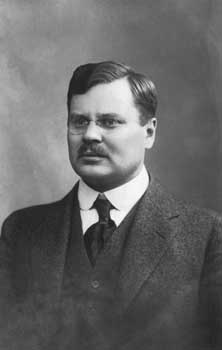
- Born: Armas Eliel Lindgren; 28 November 1874; Hämeenlinna, Grand Duchy of Finland
- Died: 3 October 1929 (aged 54); Copenhagen, Denmark
- Education: Polytechnical Institute
- Occupation: Architect
- Buildings: National Museum of Finland; Uusi ylioppilastalo Estonia Theatre

Armas Eliel Lindgren (28 November 1874 – 3 October 1929) was a Finnish architect, professor and painter.

== Biography ==
=== Early life and career ===
Armas Lindgren was born in Hämeenlinna on 28 November 1874. He studied architecture in the Polytechnical Institute of Helsinki, from where he graduated in 1897. While a student he collaborated with Josef Stenbäck and Gustaf Nyström, two well-known Finnish architects. He spent the 1898–1899 studying history of art and culture in Sweden, Denmark, Germany, France and the United Kingdom. In 1896 he founded with Herman Gesellius and Eliel Saarinen, an architectural firm named Gesellius, Lindgren, Saarinen. The firm was responsible for the realization of several important projects such as the National Museum of Finland in Helsinki.

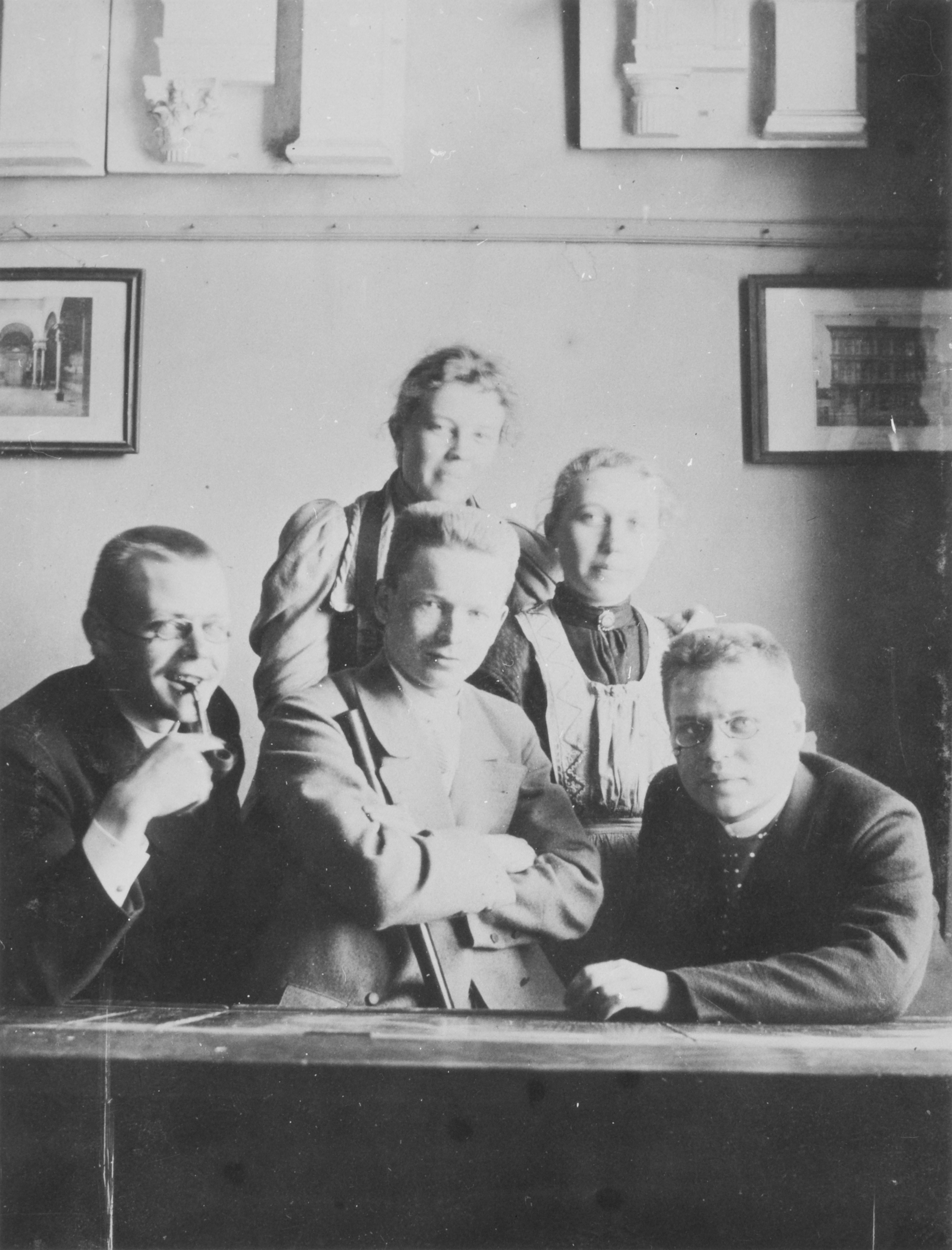
Lindgren bottom right in 1896
(Note: Accompanied by Torsten Montell and Eliel Saarinen on the bottom row, and Albertina Östman and Wivi Lönn above.)

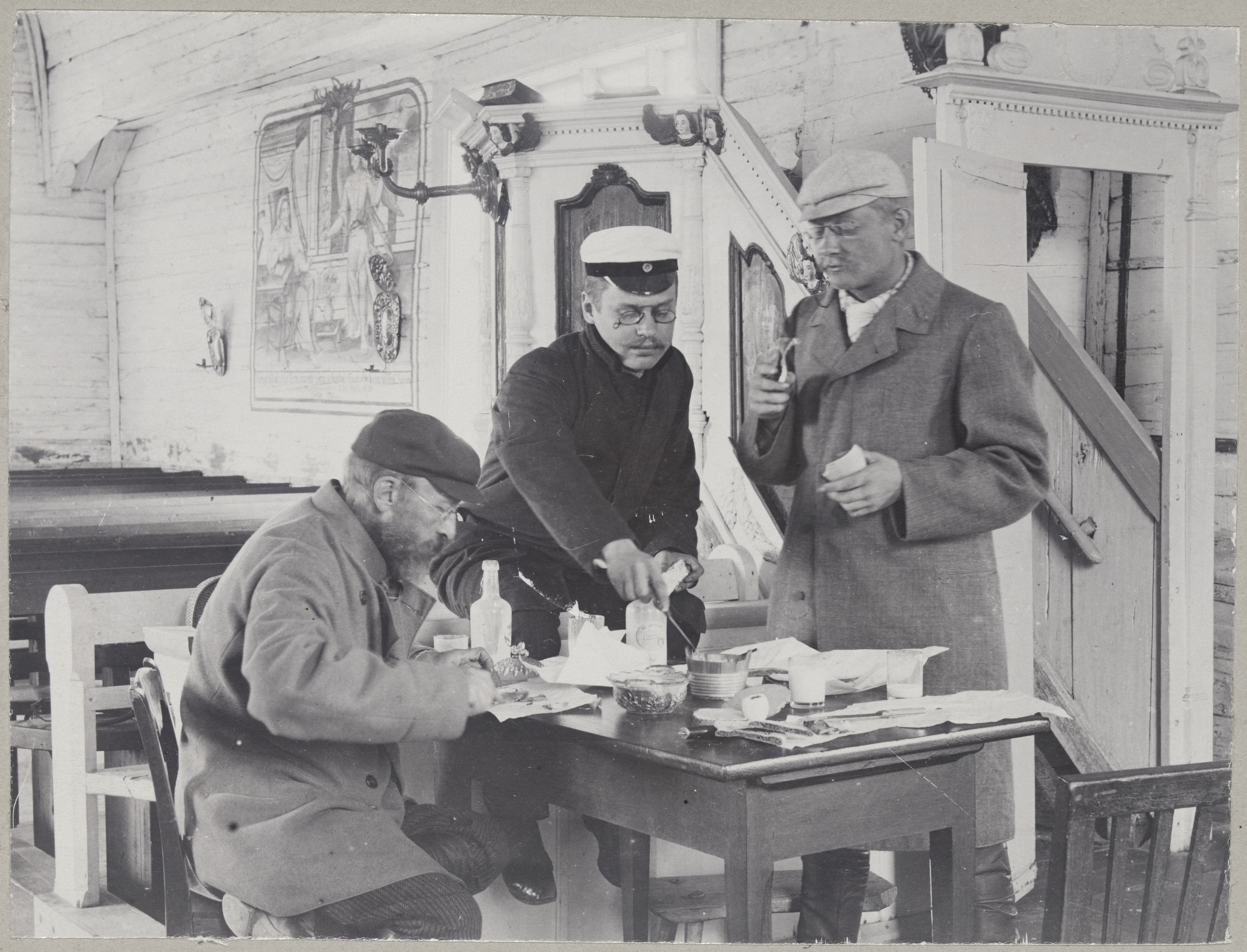
At Kempele Church in 1896

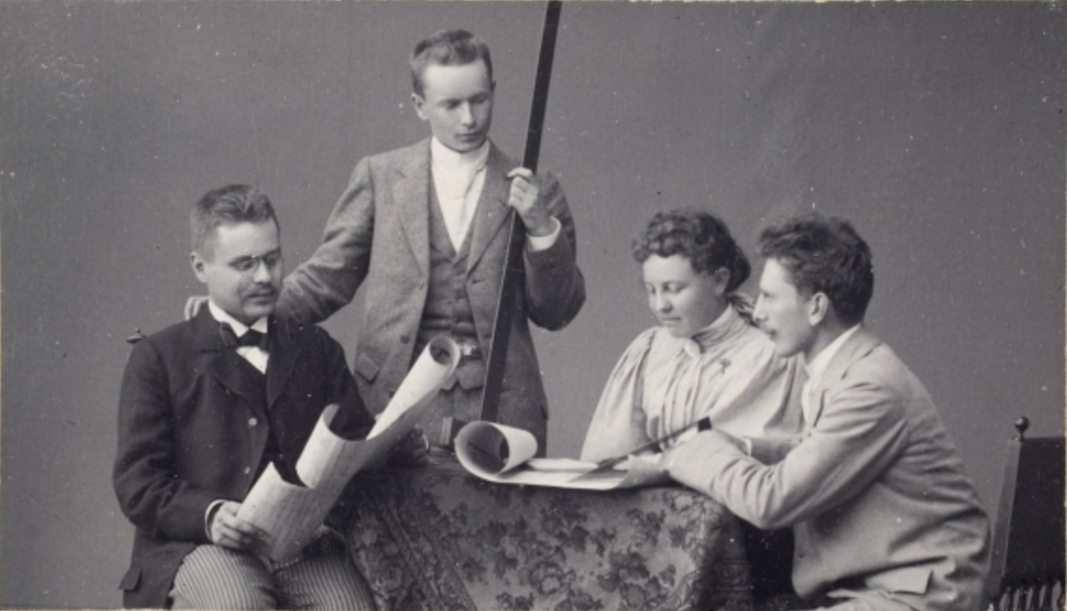
Armas Lindgren, Eliel Saarinen and Herman Gesellius in the late 1890s (with Albertina Östman)

=== Teaching ===
In 1900 he started working at the Polytechnic Institute as a teacher of art history. From 1902 to 1912 he was the Arts Director of the Central School of Applied Arts. In 1905 Lindgren departed from Gesellius, Lindgren, Saarinen. He set up his own office in 1908. Bertel Liljequist joined his office in 1916.

In the 1910s he collaborated closely with Wivi Lönn. They designed together the Uusi ylioppilastalo in 1910, also the convent of korp! Sakala 1911 and the Estonia Theatre in 1912.

=== Professor ===
In 1919 he replaced Gustaf Nyström to the position of the Professor of Architecture at the Helsinki University of Technology. As a professor he taught and influenced the notable Finnish architect Alvar Aalto.

== Notable buildings ==
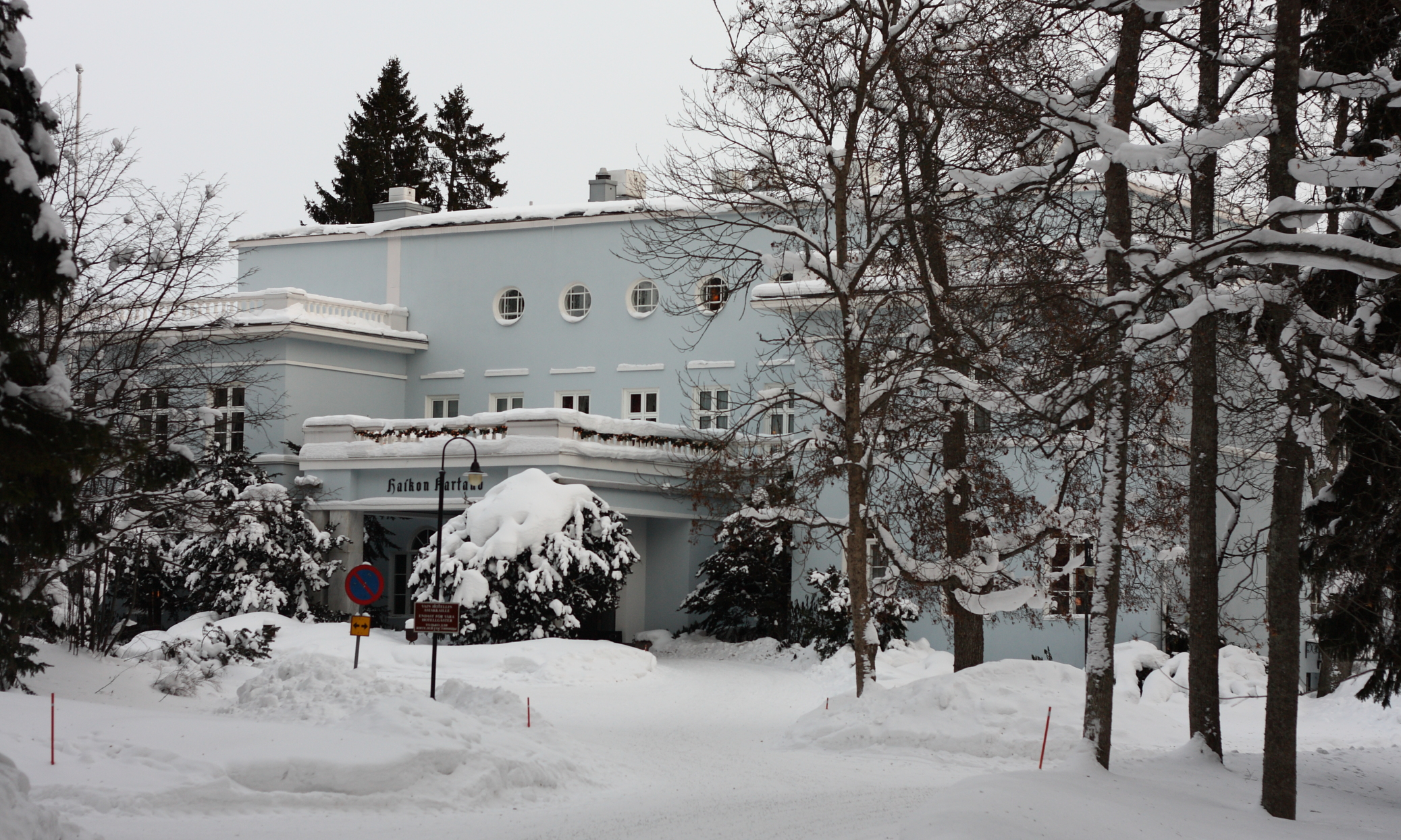
Haikko Manor, 1913

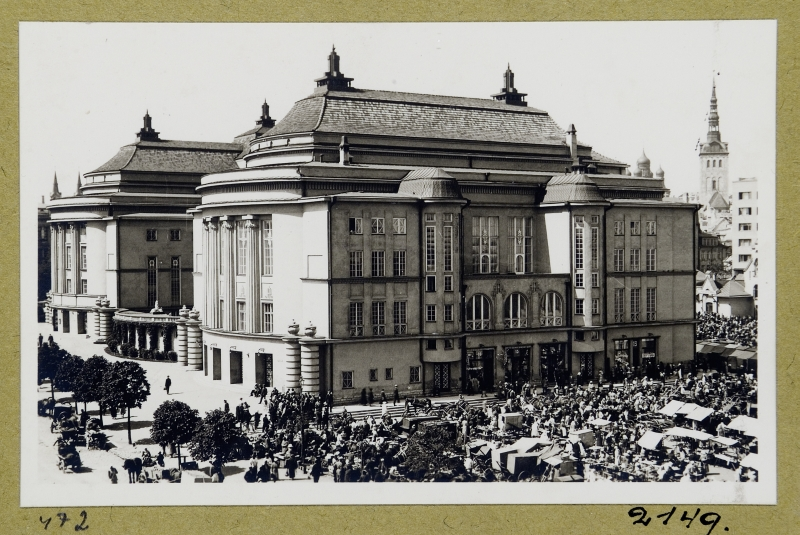
The original Estonia Theatre in Tallinn, designed together with Wivi Lönn, 1913 (later heavily damaged during, and rebuilt after, World War II)

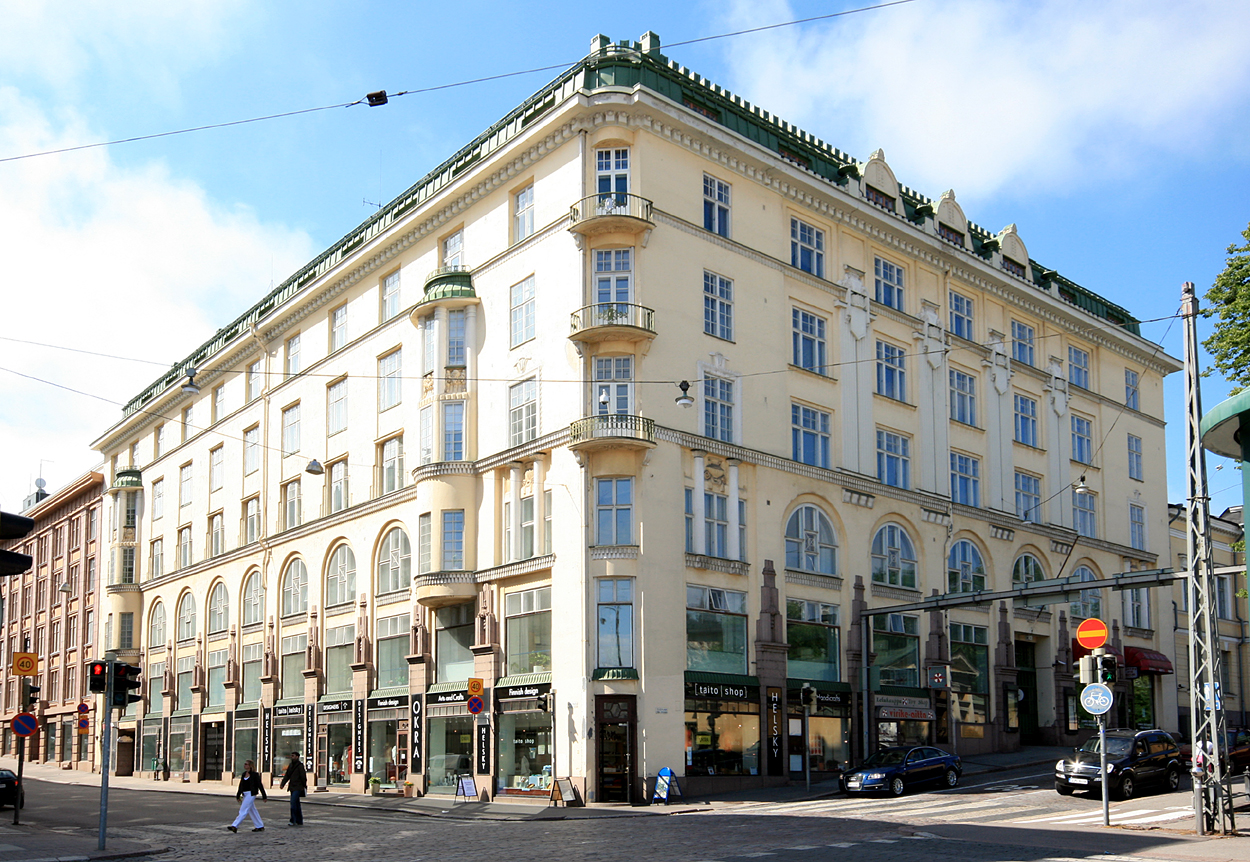
Unioninkatu 26 – Eteläesplanadi 4, Helsinki, 1913

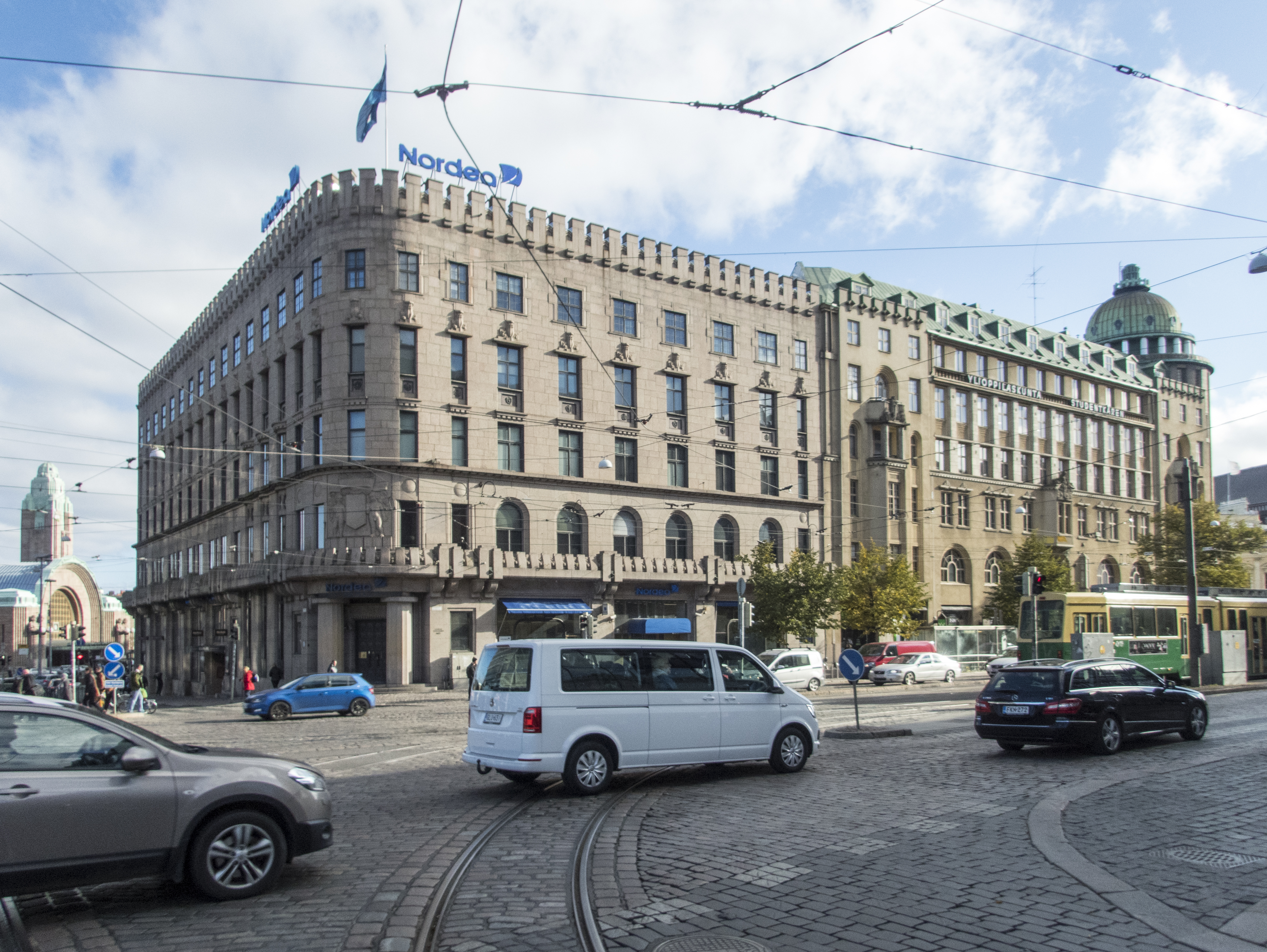
Mannerheimintie 5–7, Helsinki, 1910–1914, Mannerheimintie 5 as in Uusi Ylioppilastalo together with Wivi Lönn

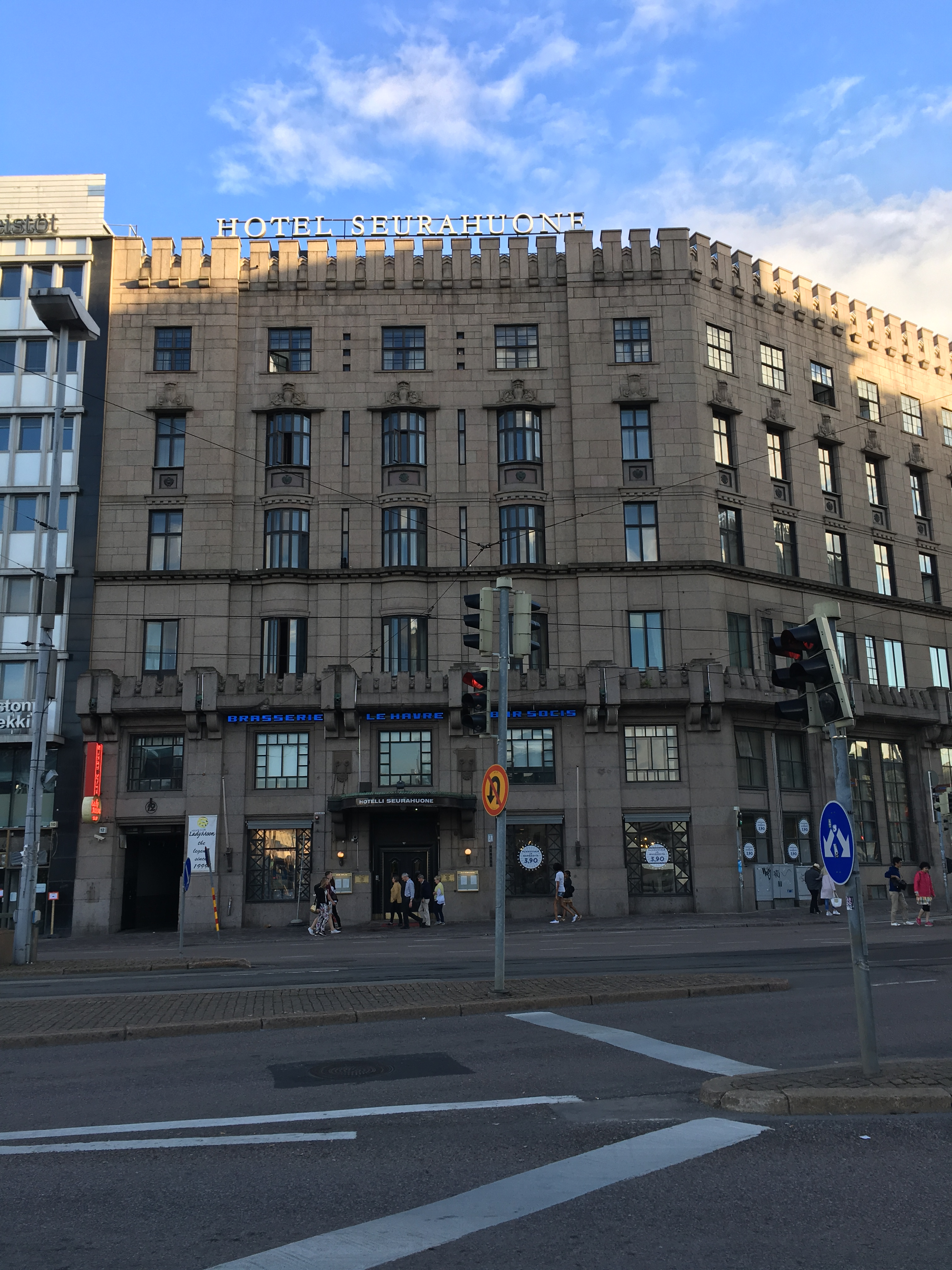
Hotel Seurahuone, former Kaleva Mutual Pension Insurance Company building, 1914

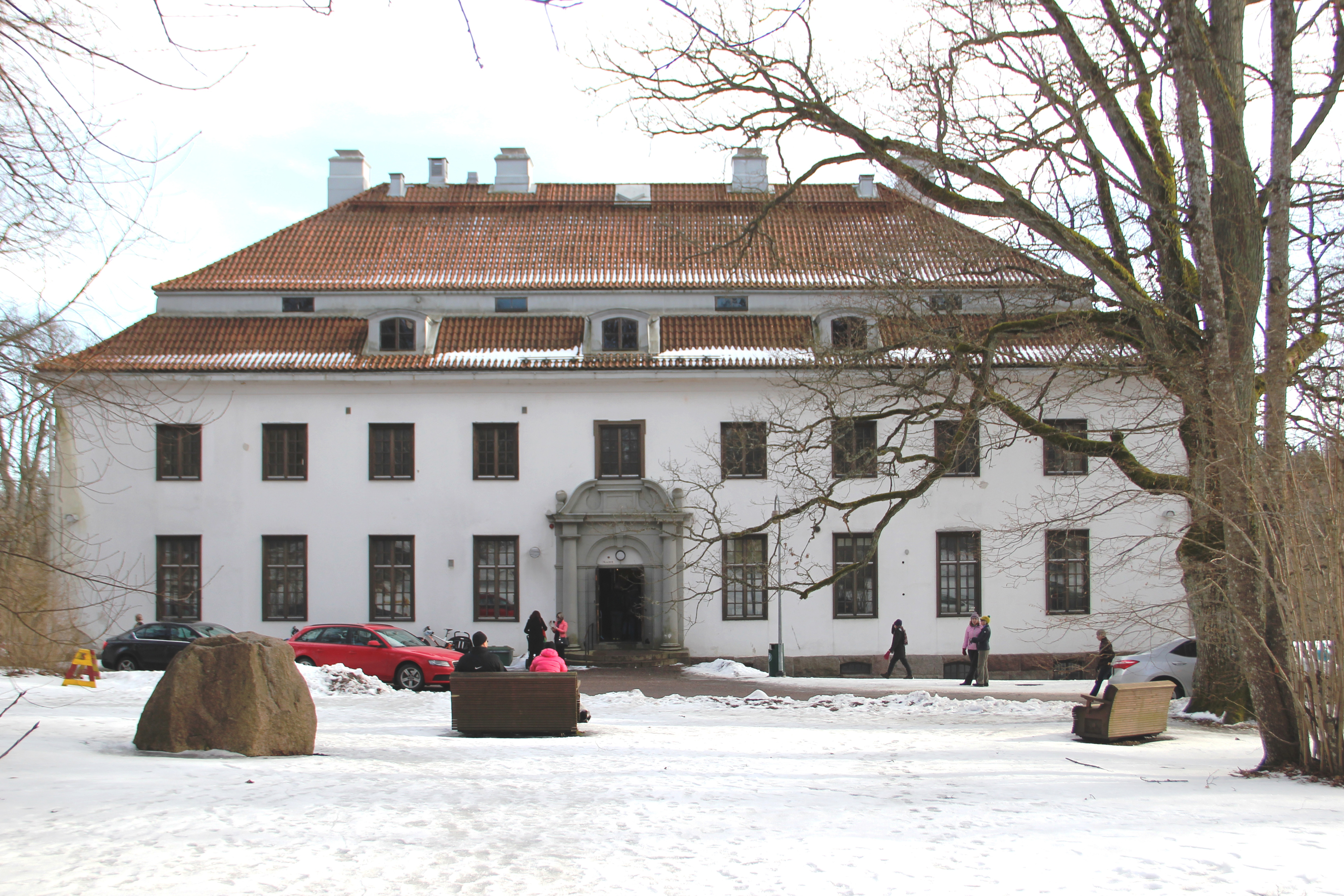
Träskända manor in Kirkkonummi together with Bertel Liljequist, built in the 1920s
