= Your Name Here (2015 film) =

- Directed by: B. P. Paquette
- Written by: B. P. Paquette
- Produced by: B. P. Paquette
- Cinematography: Mathieu Séguin
- Edited by: Ernest Riffe
- Music by: Zachary Lamothe
- Production company: Next Phase
- Distributed by: Next Phase
- Release date: September 21, 2015 (Cinefest)
- Running time: 87 minutes (completed version; 2019)
- Country: Canada
- Language: English

Your Name Here is a 2015 feature-length docufiction from Canada written and directed by B. P. Paquette and featuring dozens of amateur actors. The film examines the art and craft of movie acting, and the desire for movie stardom.

== Plot ==
Set in a film theatre as a workshop for amateur actors, Your Name Here features various aspiring actors who reveal their true selves throughout the course of the film as they simultaneously reenact the timeless story first told in the Oscar-winning Hollywood classic A Star is Born (1937 film), wherein a young woman comes to Hollywood with dreams of movie stardom, but achieves them only with the help of a tragic leading man whose best days are behind him.

== Production ==
In the fall of 2013, filmmaker B. P. Paquette gave a 3-day acting-on-screen workshop (titled, somewhat mischievously, "Adult Film Acting") in a movie theatre for the Sudbury Theatre Centre. Working with a professional crew, Paquette shot over 90 hours of material. The film is a mashup (video) comprising roughly one-third portraits or snapshots of the aspiring thespians who appear in the film, one-third original material from A Star is Born (1937 film) and one-third reenactments of scenes from the original Hollywood classic.

"I was expecting this to be a learning experience and when I went through the class I thought I sucked — I was convinced that I had blown it," said Larry Schaffer, one of the students who appears in the film. "It's so cool that this is a movie now, we had no idea that this was going on." Marie Whitehead was another one of the 35 students who thought she had just signed up for an acting class. "I think it's a brilliant idea, it was such a great experience," said Whitehead. "I had no idea that this would become a movie." The reaction was unanimous when Paquette first showed it to them, after a year of editing. "I invited them all in for a private screening at Thorneloe University and when the film came on it was like all of their jaws dropped at the same time to see themselves on the screen," said Paquette. "These were people that didn't really know each other coming in and when the film was on they were all laughing together."

This film marks Mathieu Séguin's debut as cinematographer on a feature film. He conceived the visual design with Ivan Gekoff, with whom he has worked as assistant camera.

== Festival recognition ==
At 104 minutes, Your Name Here premiered as a work-in-progress at Cinefest in 2015. The final version, completed in 2019, runs 87 minutes.

== Theatrical release ==
Your Name Here will be released commercially in theatres across Canada in 2019.

== See also ==
- Hello Cinema – a 1995 Iranian docufiction film directed by Mohsen Makhmalbaf that shows various everyday people being auditioned and explaining their reason for wanting to act in a film.
- Close-Up – a 1990 Iranian docufiction film directed by Abbas Kiarostami that recounts the story of the real-life trial of a man who impersonated film-maker Mohsen Makhmalbaf, conning a family into believing they would star in his new film.
- Someone to Love – a 1987 pseudo-documentary directed by Henry Jaglom about a filmmaker who throws a Valentine's Day party at an old movie theater that is about to be demolished and then quizzes his guests on camera about their lives.
- Filming Othello – a 1978 documentary film directed by and starring Orson Welles about the making of his Othello.
- F for Fake – the last major film completed by Orson Welles, who directed, co-wrote, and starred in the film, which is loosely a documentary that operates in several different genres and has been described as a kind of film essay.
- Docufiction
- List of docufiction films
- Metafilm
