= Filming Othello =

- Written by: Orson Welles
- Directed by: Orson Welles
- Starring: Orson Welles; Micheal MacLiammoir; Hilton Edwards
- Music by: Alberto Barberis; Angelo Francesco Lavagnino
- Country of origin: West Germany
- Original language: English

Production
- Producers: Juergen Hellwig; Klaus Hellwig
- Cinematography: Gary Graver
- Editor: Marty Roth
- Running time: 84 minutes

Original release
- Release: 1978

Filming Othello is a 1978 English-language West German documentary film directed by and starring Orson Welles about the making of his award-winning 1951 production Othello. The film, which was produced for West German television, was the last completed feature film directed by Welles, as well as the last one to be made during his lifetime.

== Synopsis ==
Filming Othello begins with Welles standing behind a moviola. He directly addresses the camera and announces: "This is to be a conversation, certainly not anything so formal as a lecture, and what we're going to talk about is Othello, Shakespeare's play and the film I made of it." Welles initially conducts a monologue where he recalls the events that lead up to the creation of Othello and some of the problems that plagued the production. As the film progresses, he switches to a conversation in a restaurant between himself and two of the film's co-stars, Micheal MacLiammoir (who played Iago) and Hilton Edwards (who played Brabantio). The three men talk at length about the making of Othello. Welles then resumes his monologue from his position behind the moviola. He then runs footage on the moviola of a question and answer session he conducted during a 1977 screening of Othello in Boston. Welles concludes the film in his position as a monologuist, proclaiming: "There are too many regrets, there are too many things I wish I could have done over again. If it wasn't a memory, if it was a project for the future, talking about Othello would have been nothing but delight. After all, promises are more fun than explanations. In all my heart, I wish that I wasn't looking back on Othello, but looking forward to it. That Othello would be one hell of a picture. Goodnight."

== Production ==
Filming Othello was made between 1974 and 1978. It was intended to be the first in a series of documentaries directed by Welles on the creation of his classic films. However, the second film in the proposed series, on the making of The Trial, was never completed.

Filming Othello was shot in 16mm, with Gary Graver as the cinematographer. Welles shot the footage of his conversation with MacLiammoir and Edwards in Paris, France, in 1974, and shot the footage of his part of their conversation two years later in Beverly Hills, California. Footage was also shot of Welles visiting Venice, Italy, but it was not included in the final print because it had been believed lost when Welles was moving around Europe. However, many years later, cinematographer Gary Graver located at least some of the footage, and short excerpts can be seen in his 1993 documentary Working With Orson Welles, in which Welles (theatrically clad in black cape and black hat) rides around Venice in a gondola pointing out old filming locations, while crowds wave at him.

The film includes a conversation with a Cambridge, Massachusetts audience after a screening of the film on 8 January 1977 at the 400-seat Cinema 1 inside the Orson Welles Cinema Complex. (Welles had starred in An Evening With Orson Welles the night before at Boston Symphony Hall.)

Some of Welles' The Other Side of the Wind crew—Gary Graver, Michael Stringer and Larry Jackson—worked on Filming Othello.

Filming Othello uses clips from Othello, but the footage is not accompanied by the film's dialogue track.

== Distribution ==
Filming Othello was first shown at the 1978 Berlin Film Festival. It was first screened in the U.S. in 1979 at the Public Theater in New York, where it played on a double bill with Othello. However, the film's presentation did not receive newspaper reviews. Filming Othello had no further U.S. screenings until it returned to New York in 1987 for an engagement at the Film Forum, a nonprofit cinema, and that presentation was acknowledged by Vincent Canby of The New York Times as "entertaining and revealing" and "full of priceless anecdotes."

Filming Othello was released on home video for the first time on 10 October 2017 by The Criterion Collection. It was included in DVD and Blu-ray sets featuring newly restored 4K digital transfers of both the 1952 European and 1955 U.S. versions of Othello.

== See also ==
- Your Name Here – a 2015 Canadian docufiction film directed by B. P. Paquette featuring dozens of amateur actors and that examines the art and craft of movie acting, and the desire for movie stardom.
- Hello Cinema – a 1995 Iranian docufiction film directed by Mohsen Makhmalbaf that shows various everyday people being auditioned and explaining their reason for wanting to act in a film.
- Someone to Love - a 1987 pseudo-documentary directed by Henry Jaglom about a filmmaker who throws a Valentine's Day party at an old movie theater that is about to be demolished and then quizzes his guests on camera about their lives.
- F for Fake – the last major film completed by Orson Welles, who directed, co-wrote, and starred in the film, which is loosely a documentary that operates in several different genres and has been described as a kind of film essay.
