= F for Fake =

1973 film by Orson Welles

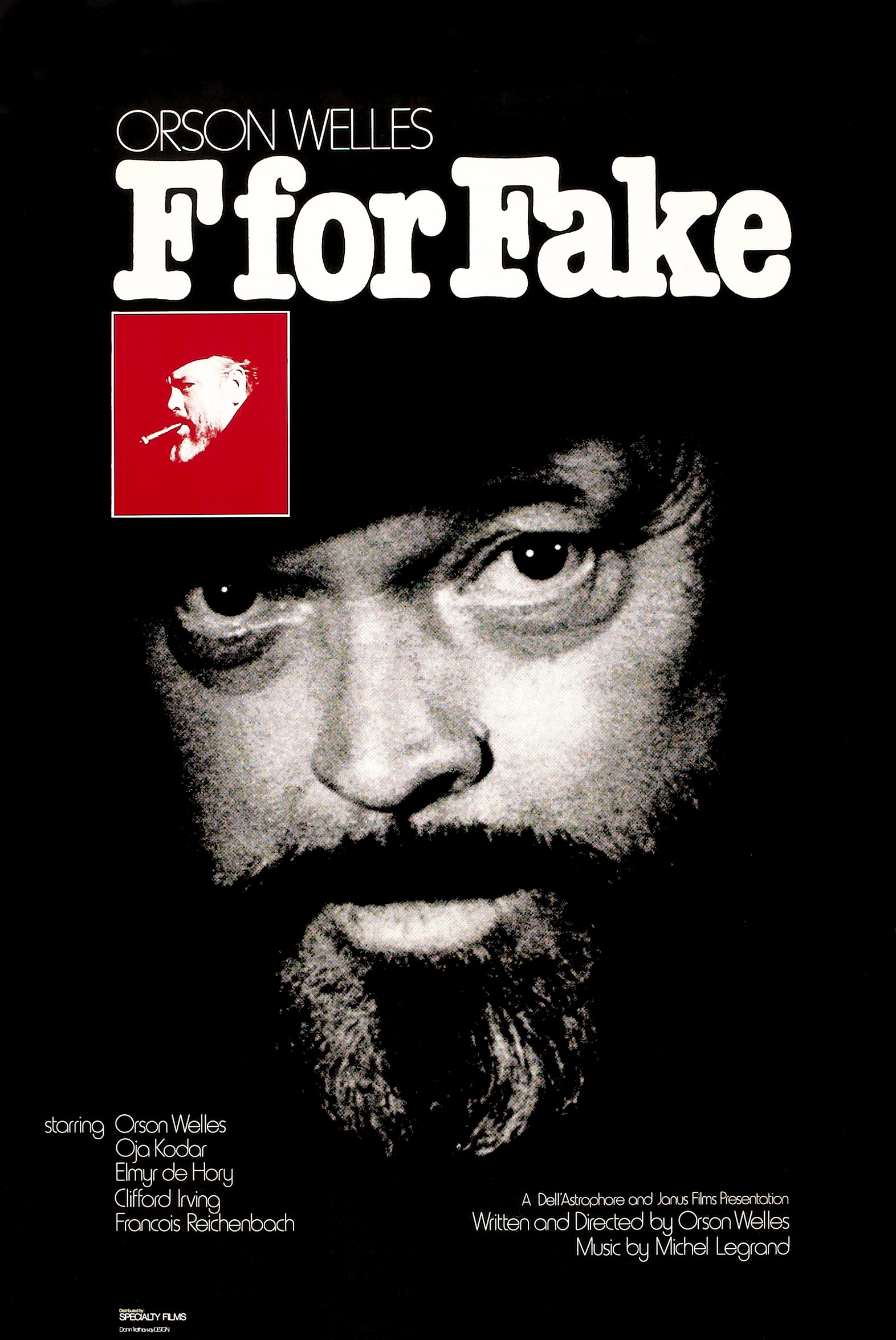
- US theatrical release poster
- Directed by: Orson Welles
- Written by: Orson Welles; Oja Kodar
- Produced by: François Reichenbach; Dominique Antoine; Richard Drewett
- Starring: Orson Welles; Oja Kodar; Elmyr de Hory; Clifford Irving; Edith Irving; François Reichenbach
- Cinematography: François Reichenbach (Note: France); Gary Graver (Note: United States)
- Edited by: Marie-Sophie Dubus; Dominique Engerer; Gary Graver (Note: uncredited); Orson Welles (Note: uncredited)
- Music by: Michel Legrand
- Distributed by: Planfilm; Specialty Films
- Release date: 1973 (San Sebastián)
- Running time: 88 minutes
- Countries: France; Iran; West Germany
- Language: English
- Box office: 182,857 admissions (France)

F for Fake (French: Vérités et mensonges, "Truths and lies") is a 1973 docudrama film co-written, directed by, and starring Orson Welles who worked on the film alongside François Reichenbach, Oja Kodar, and Gary Graver. The film focuses on Elmyr de Hory's recounting of his career as a professional art forger; de Hory's story serves as the backdrop for a meandering investigation of the natures of authorship and authenticity, as well as the basis of the value of art. Far from serving as a traditional documentary on de Hory, the film also incorporates Welles's companion Oja Kodar, hoax biographer Clifford Irving, and Orson Welles as himself. F for Fake is sometimes considered an example of a film essay.

In addition to the 88-minute film, in 1976, Welles also shot and edited a self-contained nine-minute short film as a "trailer", almost entirely composed of original material not found in the main film itself.

== Plot ==
After performing magic tricks to children and quoting Jean Eugène Robert-Houdin to the effect that a magician is just an actor, Orson Welles makes a promise that everything seen in the next hour of the film will be factual. He is watched on by Oja Kodor, who partakes in an experiment in girl-watching, walking around deliberately drawing attention to herself and seeing how many men ogle her. Welles goes on to narrate the story of Elmyr de Hory, an art forger who sold many fake paintings to museums and collectors all over the world. De Hory throws a dinner party at his home in Ibiza, where he is feted by European society; one of his guests is Clifford Irving, who had published a biography of de Hory called Fake, and who tells about the art dealers who were fooled by De Hory's forgeries, leading Welles to consider whether this means art dealers and appraisers are fake also.

Welles notes the irony of Irving commenting on forgeries when he was revealed to have created a fake "authorized biography" of Howard Hughes, which contained unverified stories of Hughes' unusual behavior. Welles questions if believing such stories makes a person credulous or not, and questions the true wisdom of the experts who verified Irving's book as authentic. François Reichenbach tells how de Hory provided him with paintings of questionable authenticity, which art dealers seemed to willfully overlook. Welles recounts his own history with fakery: getting an acting job in Ireland by claiming to be a famous New York actor; his radio broadcast of The War of the Worlds; and how Citizen Kane was originally going to be a fictionalized version of Howard Hughes’ life.

Irving recounts how de Hory was destitute when younger and subsisted in America by making and selling forgeries, while avoiding the law through frequent relocations. He was offered his home in Ibiza by an art dealer, was never prosecuted as nobody witnessed the actual art forging, and his work revealed the depth of the art market's complicity in deceiving buyers. De Hory insists he never signed any forgery, leading Welles to question how much a signature truly matters on an art work, contrasting this point with the names of those who helped build the Chartres Cathedral are all unknown, but their work endures.

Finally, Welles recounts how Oja Kodar was spotted by Pablo Picasso while they were once holidaying in the same village, and he persuaded her to pose for him while he painted her. Picasso obliged when Kodar insisted she be allowed to keep the paintings, later becoming enraged after reading of an exhibition of his new works. He flew out to the exhibition to discover the pieces were all forgeries created by Kodar's grandfather. Kodar and Welles re-enect the exchange between Picasso and the grandfather, who defends his work with pride and suggests the forgeries go un-reported, to allow him an artistic legacy that Picasso already has. Picasso angrily demanded the paintings back, but the grandfather had burned them. Welles then confesses that he had promised everything in the "next hour" was true, and that hour had already passed, admitting the entire story of Kodar, her grandfather, and Picasso was made up. He apologizes, quotes Picasso's statement that art is a lie that makes us see the truth, and bids the audience good evening.

== Cast ==
Elmyr de Hory

- Orson Welles – Himself
- Elmyr de Hory – The Art Forger
- Oja Kodar – The Girl
- Joseph Cotten – Special Participant
- François Reichenbach – Special Participant
- Richard Wilson – Special Participant
- Paul Stewart – Special Participant
- Mark Forgy – Assistant to Elmyr de Hory
- Alexander Welles – Special Participant (as Sasa Devcic)
- Gary Graver – Special Participant
- Andrés Vicente Gómez – Special Participant
- Julio Palinkas – Special Participant
- Christian Odasso – Special Participant
- Françoise Widhoff – Special Participant

=== Others ===
- Peter Bogdanovich – Special Participant (voice)
- William Alland – Special Participant (voice)
- Howard Hughes - Himself (uncredited)
- Jean-Pierre Aumont – Himself (uncredited)
- Laurence Harvey – Himself (uncredited)
- Clifford Irving – Himself (uncredited)
- Nina van Pallandt – Herself (uncredited)

== Production ==
=== Background ===
Orson Welles was hired to edit a documentary by François Reichenbach about the art forger Elmyr de Hory. The film grew over time to encompass de Hory, as well as de Hory's biographer Clifford Irving, who was revealed to be a forger himself. Keith Woodward explains: "following Irving’s hoax, Welles and his cinematographer, Gary Graver, shifted gears, scrambling to keep up with the Hughes affair, adding new shots, re-thinking the narrative, re-editing, re-combining different themes, incorporating emerging material." Welles used these circumstances to produce a meditation on the nature of fakery, which he called "a new kind of movie … it’s a form, in other words, the essay, the personal essay, as opposed to the documentary."

Several storylines are presented in the film, including those of de Hory, Irving, Welles, Howard Hughes and Kodar. About de Hory, we learn that he was a struggling artist who turned to forgery out of desperation, only to see the greater share of the profits from his deceptions go to doubly unscrupulous art dealers. As partial compensation for that injustice, he is maintained in a villa in Ibiza by one of his dealers. What is only hinted at in Welles's documentary is that de Hory had recently served a two-month sentence in a Spanish prison for homosexuality and consorting with criminals. (de Hory would commit suicide two years after the initial release of Welles's film, on hearing that Spain had agreed to turn him over to the French authorities.)

Irving's original part in F for Fake was as de Hory's biographer, but his part grew unexpectedly at some point during production. There has not always been agreement among commentators over just how that production unfolded, but the now-accepted story is that the director François Reichenbach shot a documentary about de Hory and Irving before giving his footage to Welles, who then shot additional footage with Reichenbach as his cinematographer.

In the time between the shooting of Reichenbach's documentary and the finishing of Welles's, it became known that Irving had perpetrated a hoax of his own, namely a fabricated "authorized biography" of Howard Hughes (the hoax was later fictionalized in The Hoax). This discovery prompted the shooting of still more footage, which then got woven into F for Fake. Interweaving the narratives even more, there are several pieces of footage in the film showing Welles at a party with De Hory, and, at one point, De Hory even signs a painting with a forgery of Welles's signature. Some of Hughes's career is outlined in the form of a parody of the "News on the March" sequence in Citizen Kane. Welles also draws parallels between the De Hory and Irving hoaxes and his own brush with early notoriety by including a recreation of part of his 1938 War of the Worlds radio drama, which had simulated a newscast about a Martian invasion and sparked panic among some listeners.

The story about Kodar, her grandfather, and Picasso and some forger paintings that the grandfather supposedly made is presented at the end of the film before Welles reminds the viewer that he only promised to tell the truth for an hour, and that "for the last 17 minutes, I've been lying my head off." In the commentary to the Criterion Collection DVD release of F for Fake, Kodar claims the idea for this segment as her own. She also claims credit for the movie's opening sequence, which consists of shots of a minidress-clad Kodar walking down streets while rubbernecking male admirers (unaware that they are being filmed) stop and openly stare. This sequence is described by Kodar as inspired by her feminism; in his narration, Welles claims the footage was originally shot for an unrelated production.

=== Filming locations ===
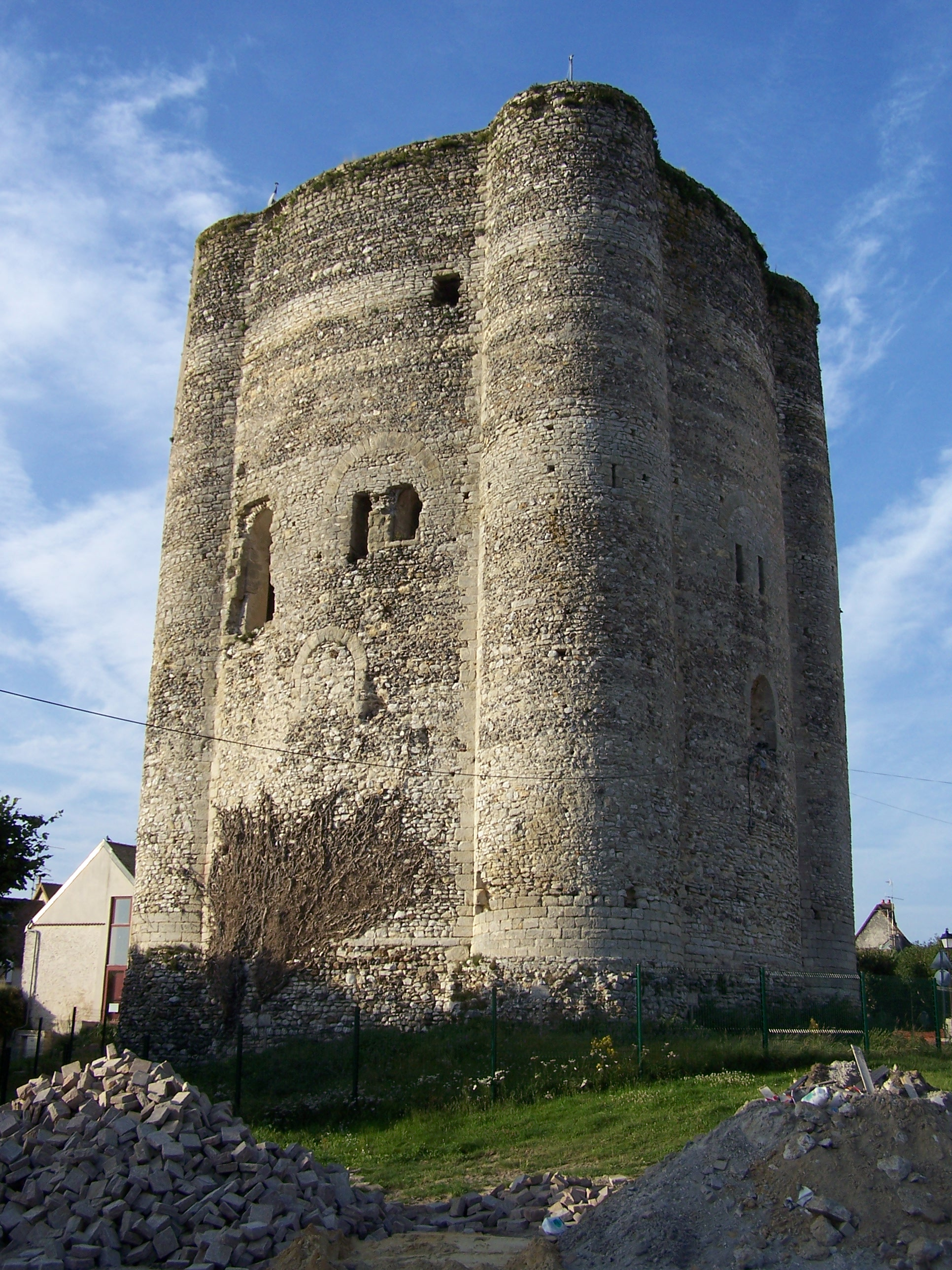
The Donjon de Houdan, seen in the Oja and Picasso story.

- Rome, Italy – Girl-watching sequence
- Ibiza, Spain – 16 mm elements from the original Reichenbach documentary
- Paris, France – Gare d'Austerlitz, Champ de Mars, art gallery on left bank, La Méditerranée seafood restaurant
- Las Vegas
- Los Angeles – The Beverly Hills Hotel – The ham sandwich of Howard Hughes
- Chartres Cathedral – France
- Orvilliers, France – Orson Welles and Oja Kodar house—editing-room scenes, set for various indoor scenes
- Houdan, France – Oja and Picasso story
- Paris-Orly Airport – South terminal terrace and main hall

== Release ==
=== Trailer ===
F for Fake was not released in the USA until 1976. When it finally came out, Welles produced a preview "trailer" for it, which was effectively a wholly original nine-minute film, shot and edited in a similar style to the film itself. Apart from some very brief split-second camera shots, the entire film is a self-contained short containing original material starring Welles, Gary Graver and Oja Kodar. The trailer raises new questions about key people in the main film: Picasso, Kodar, Elmyr, and others. These allegations are supposedly revealed in the main film. They include a wig, Oja Kodar's fake name, her tiger (not shown in the film at all), and extraterrestrial sponsors of Welles's War of the Worlds broadcast. The trailer has subsequently been restored in colour, and is included as an extra on some DVD versions of the film.

=== Critical reception ===
F for Fake faced widespread popular rejection at the time of release. Critical reaction ranged from praise to confusion and hostility, with many finding the work to be self-indulgent or incoherent. F for Fake has grown in stature over the years, with reception growing more positive. The film embraces ideas from the self-conscious notation of the film process to the ironic employment of 1950s-era B movie footage (Earth vs. the Flying Saucers). Welles thought he was creating a new form of cinema. When writer Jonathan Rosenbaum asked Welles if he was creating a documentary, he replied: “No, not a documentary—a new kind of film."

On review aggregator Rotten Tomatoes, the film has an approval rating of 88% based on 52 reviews, with an average rating of 7.79/10. The website's critical consensus reads: "F for Fake playfully poses intriguing questions while proving that even Orson Welles' minor works contain their share of masterful moments." In July 2021, the film was shown in the Cannes Classics section at the 2021 Cannes Film Festival. On Metacritic, F for Fake has a score of 87 out of 100 based on 18 critic reviews, indicating "universal acclaim."

==== Questions of truthfulness ====
Author Robert Anton Wilson, a great fan of the film, argued in Cosmic Trigger III: My Life After Death that the film was itself largely an intentional effort at fakery by Welles in support of the film's themes. Most directly, Wilson reports that in the BBC documentary Orson Welles: Stories of a Life in Film, Welles stated that "everything in that film was a trick." Secondly, many of the interviews in the film were with people who were themselves directly involved with forgery in one way or another, often making statements that would have been known by the filmmakers to be false, but which were allowed to pass without comment in the film. Similarly, Welles himself made numerous false statements about Oja Kodar in the film. Finally, Wilson points out several scenes which, while presented in a way that implies they were filmed in real time, were upon further inspection clearly fabricated from unrelated pieces of footage in a way guaranteed to mislead the casual viewer. An example of this appears with a series of near-wordless shots of Irving and de Hory seemingly in debate as to whether de Hory ever signed his forgeries; the shots of Irving and de Hory were in fact taken at different times.

Welles's autobiographical asides in the film reflect on his 1938 radio adaptation of The War of the Worlds, which he alleges caused a nationwide panic with its fake news broadcast. In introducing this chapter of his life, Welles declares his uncertainty as to his own authenticity, as he believes he too has engaged in fraud. While the basic facts of The War of the Worlds incident are correctly given, the apparent excerpts from the play featured in the movie are fabrications, including a scene in which President Roosevelt meets the Martian invaders—something which did not happen in the original broadcast.

=== Home media releases ===
- 1995 Home Vision Cinema, Janus Films VHS (FAK 010), 25 July 1995
- 1995 The Criterion Collection, Laserdisc (Spine #260), 27 July 1995 – Single disc edition, with the special feature of the Theatrical Trailer contained after the film
- 2005 The Criterion Collection, Region 1 DVD (Spine #288), 26 April 2005 – Two-disc special edition including audio commentary by Oja Kodar and Gary Graver, an introduction by Peter Bogdanovich, and the documentary Orson Welles: One-Man Band (1995)
- 2009 Madman Entertainment Directors Suite, Region 4 DVD, 20 May 2009 – Special features include audio commentary by Adrian Martin, Monash University, and the documentary Orson Welles: One-Man Band (1995)
- 2010 Eureka Video: Masters of Cinema, Region 2 DVD (Spine #31) – Special features include audio commentary by cinematographer Gary Graver and Bill Krohn, and Jonathan Rosenbaum on F For Fake

== See also ==
- Me and Orson Welles - a fictionalized retelling of the life of Orson Welles. Directed by Richard Linklater, starring Zac Efron
- Someone to Love - a 1987 pseudo-documentary directed by Henry Jaglom about a filmmaker who throws a Valentine's Day party at an old movie theater that is about to be demolished and then quizzes his guests on camera about their lives.
- Filming Othello – a 1978 documentary film directed by and starring Orson Welles about the making of his 1951 production Othello.
- Hello Cinema – a 1995 Iranian docufiction film that shows various everyday people being auditioned and explaining their reason for wanting to act in a film.

== Bibliography ==
- Claudia Thieme, F for Fake: And the Growth in Complexity of Orson Welles' Documentary Form (Peter Lang Pub., 1997) 174pp.
