= Perspective (film series) =

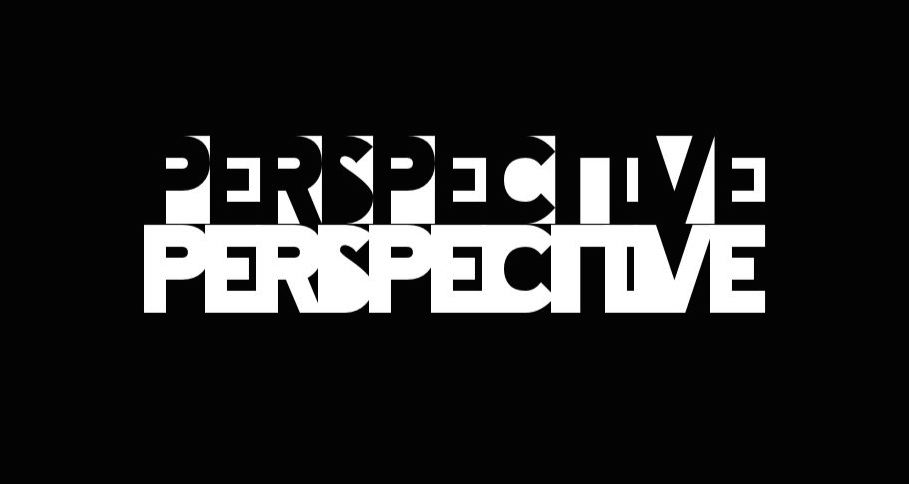
- Directed by: B. P. Paquette
- Written by: B. P. Paquette
- Produced by: B. P. Paquette
- Starring: Stéphane Paquette; Patricia Tedford; Pandora Topp
- Cinematography: Ivan Gekoff
- Edited by: Ernest Riffe
- Music by: Daniel Bedard
- Production company: Next Phase
- Distributed by: Next Phase
- Running time: 179 minutes
- Country: Canada
- Language: English
- Budget: $1.2 million CAD

Perspective is an episodic drama film from Canada written and directed by B. P. Paquette and starring Stéphane Paquette, Patricia Tedford, and Pandora Topp in a love triangle. The film is divided into nine chapters, shot over nine years, that span nine years in the lives of three characters named “Alex”. The nine chapters, titled, respectively, Chapter 1: Salt & Soda (2012), Chapter 2: Chris and Other Beards (2013), Chapter 3: Hush, hsuH (2014), Chapter 4: Reflecting (2015), Chapter 5: Triangulation (2016), Chapter 6: The Saddest Lines (2017), Chapter 7: Me, Myself, and I (2018), Chapter 8: Marital Accumulation (2019), and Chapter 9: The Shed of Theseus (2020) have been completed and presented exclusively at Cinéfest Sudbury International Film Festival as of 2020.

== Production history ==
Subtitled Variations on a Love Triangle in 9 Chapters, Perspective is unique in that it is a feature-length fiction film that started in 2012, and continued to evolve until its completion in 2020. Every year a new chapter of the film was presented exclusively at Cinéfest until the project was complete. Each chapter runs approximately 15 to 30 minutes, with the completed film running 179 minutes. The time-lapse between chapters is integrated into the narrative. At the premiere of each additional chapter, the preceding chapters were replayed.

Shot and set in Northern Ontario, the film features music and sound design (the onscreen credit states "soundscapes") by Daniel Bédard, picture editing by Ernest Riffe, and cinematography by Ivan Gekoff.

B. P. Paquette employed Perspective as a teaching tool for his film production students in the Motion Picture Arts program at Thorneloe University. "It was to encourage the students that they don't need millions of dollars, big movie stars and huge crews to make a feature-length film," said Paquette.

=== Casting ===
In each chapter of the film, the three actors rotate which roles they play. According to Paquette, “We’re not letting the audience identify a character with an actor... So, at all times, all of the actors are all of the characters.”

== Chapters ==
The film features only three performers who each play, at various points, each of the three characters named "Alex". Within the narrative, each chapter occurs months to a year apart from the proceeding chapter, and the duration of each chapter is between 15 and 30 minutes.

No.	Title
1	"Salt & Soda"
The film starts with Stéphane Paquette and Patricia Tedford, who play a domestic couple, and Pandora Topp, who plays Patricia's best friend. At a house party, Pandora 's character discreetly propositions Stéphane's character. Each character is named "Alex."
2	"Chris and Other Beards"
An affair commences. The adulterous couple discuss the idea that we only present specific versions of ourselves to each other, and that, were it possible for us to access these versions of ourselves, would we recognize ourselves. The domestic couple has a playful discussion regarding each member's potential unfaithfulness to the other (hence the inclusion of "Beard (companion)" in the chapter title.
3	"Hush, hsuH"
The adulterous member of the domestic couple contemplates the termination of their domestic partnership while the other member of the domestic couple contemplates the possibility that their partner is involved in an adulterous affair.
4	"Reflecting"
Each of the three characters named Alex shares a personal experience wherein they were "the other (wo)man."
5	"Triangulation"
The affair may or may not be over while Alex may or may not be engaging in "Triangulation (psychology)," wherein someone plays two others against each other.
6	"The Saddest Lines"
The treatment of time is ambiguous as this chapter begins with what may be Alex reflecting on past incidents, including: a sequence that may be the last meeting of the adulterous couple; a scene wherein Alex leaves a nasty voicemail intending to end the adulterous affair; a probably non-real confrontation scene in a theatrical theatre; for reasons unknown, Alex performs a Spanish-language version of Pablo Neruda's poem Tonight I Can Write into a laptop; Alex threatens to expose their affair.
7	"Me, Myself, and I"
This chapter concerns a difficult moment between a parent and child; a theatricalized reflection on a relationship now soured; Alex on the verge of a nervous breakdown; and a nightmare.
8	"Marital Accumulation"
Stormy weather while on a solo vacation in the Caribbean forces Alex indoors where he examines his former home via Google Street View and ponders his former married life; living alone in her new condo, Alex reflects on her failed marriage during an extra snowy winter; while in bed with someone not unlike herself, Alex discusses the incongruous nature of marriage; Alex remembers all that was said, "Told me love was too plebeian. Told me you were through with me and..."
9	"The Shed of Theseus"
In this concluding chapter, variations of Alex attend a wedding reception that is also attended by variations of their former best friend Alex, and variations of their former illicit lover Alex.

== Release ==
Each of the nine chapters that compose Perspective has premiered at Cinefest in, respectively, 2012, 2013, 2014, 2015, 2016, 2017, 2018, 2019, and 2020.

== See also ==
- List of films shot over three or more years
- Antoine Doinel – In five films, French filmmaker François Truffaut followed the fictional life of Antoine Doinel (played by Jean-Pierre Léaud) - beginning in 1959, with following films for 1962, 1968, 1970 and 1979.
- Up series – a series of documentary films that have followed the lives of fourteen British children since 1964, when they were seven years old.
- That Obscure Object of Desire – Luis Buñuel's last film is now considered by many to be a masterpiece wherein two actresses play the same character interchangeably.
- Palindromes – Heavily criticized upon release, especially for director Todd Solondz's decision to cast eight actors as his lead character.
