= Ivan Gekoff =

Ivan Gekoff is a Bulgaria-born Canadian cinematographer, and a member of the Canadian Society of Cinematographers, His experience comprises feature films, movie-of-the-weeks, TV programs, short films, TV commercials, music videos, as well as a number of projects for the National Film Board of Canada. He collaborates frequently with Canadian filmmaker B. P. Paquette. In total, Gekoff has worked on over 50 fiction and documentary films.

== Background ==
Born in Sofia, Bulgaria, in 1948, Gekoff has worked extensively in the film industry since 1971. He has a Master's degree in cinematography from the National Academy of Art. Before emigrating to Canada, Gekoff worked as a camera operator using a self-designed camera stabilizer mount, much like a Steadicam, on Andrei Tarkovsky's Stalker that allowed for the film's acclaimed smooth shots over uneven surfaces. He has taught cinematography at Concordia University in Montreal, and at the Department of Media Production and Studies, University of Regina. In 2005, Gekoff became part of a research team of consultants for Kodak film company, and has collaborated on a number of projects, preparing the industry for the transition to digital.

Gekoff has collaborated on five of the six feature films directed by indie Canadian filmmaker B. P. Paquette, three as cinematographer and two as visual consultant.

== Acclaim ==
When Hathi was reviewed in Variety, the headline of film critic Godfrey Cheshire's review proclaimed that the film features photography "that is so gorgeous, and occasionally startling, that few viewers will soon forget its images. While pic's poetically spare narrative may prove too slight and undramatic for some, limiting its broader commercial chances, sheer visual magic alone should make it a strong contender in tube and fest situations." Later in the same review, Cheshire noted the "extraordinary impact by Ivan Gekoff’s exquisite lensing."

The documentary Out In the Cold (2008) brought him the prestigious SaskFilm award for Best Cinematography.

== Filmography ==
Title	Year	Cinematographer	Visual Consultant	notes
Unknown Icons	1982	Yes	No	feature documentary
The Salvation	1984	Yes	No	feature fiction
Eshelonite	1986	Yes	No	feature fiction
Transports of Death	1987	Yes	No	feature fiction
Obstruction of Justice	1994	Yes	No	feature fiction
La fabrication d'un meurtrier	1996	Yes	No	feature fiction
Hathi	1998	Yes	No	feature fiction
Violet	2000	Yes	No	feature fiction
Women Without Wings	2002	Yes	No	feature fiction
A Year in the Death of Jack Richards	2004	No	Yes	feature fiction
The Descendant	2007	Yes	No	feature fiction
La lâcheté	2007	Yes	No	feature fiction
The Woman of Ahhs: A Self-Portrait by Victoria Fleming	2008	Yes	No	feature fiction
Perspective	2012-2020	Yes	No	feature fiction
Your Name Here	2018	No	Yes	feature docufiction
The Anonymous Rudy S.	2018	Yes	No	feature fiction
