= That Obscure Object of Desire =

1977 film by Luis Buñuel

- French theatrical release poster
- French: Cet obscur objet du désir
- Directed by: Luis Buñuel
- Screenplay by: Luis Buñuel; Jean-Claude Carrière
- Based on: The Woman and the Puppet by Pierre Louÿs
- Produced by: Serge Silberman
- Starring: Fernando Rey; Carole Bouquet; Ángela Molina; Julien Bertheau
- Cinematography: Edmond Richard
- Edited by: Hélène Plemiannikov
- Production companies: Greenwich Film Productions; Les Films Galaxie; InCine
- Distributed by: GEF-CCFC (France); InCine (Spain)
- Release dates: 17 August 1977 (France); 1 March 1978 (Spain)
- Running time: 102 minutes
- Countries: France; Spain
- Languages: French; Spanish

That Obscure Object of Desire (French: Cet obscur objet du désir, Spanish: Ese oscuro objeto del deseo) is a 1977 absurdist satirical comedy-drama film directed by Luis Buñuel, based on the 1898 novel The Woman and the Puppet by Pierre Louÿs. It was Buñuel's final directorial effort before his death in July 1983. Set in Spain and France against the backdrop of a terrorist insurgency, the film conveys the story told through a series of flashbacks by an aging Frenchman, Mathieu (played by Spanish actor Fernando Rey), who recounts falling in love with a beautiful young Spanish woman, Conchita (played interchangeably by two actresses, the French actress, Carole Bouquet and the Spanish actress, Ángela Molina), who repeatedly frustrates his romantic and sexual desires. The film was nominated for the Academy Award for Best Foreign Language Film at the 50th Academy Awards representing for Spain.

In recent years, the film has been highly acclaimed by critics and is considered one of Buñuel's greatest movies and a fine swan song for his extensive career.

== Plot ==
A dysfunctional and sometimes violent romance unfolds between Mathieu (Fernando Rey), a middle-aged, wealthy Frenchman, and Conchita, a young, impoverished, and beautiful flamenco dancer from Seville, portrayed by Carole Bouquet and Ángela Molina. The two actresses appear unpredictably in separate scenes, differing not only physically but also temperamentally.

Most of the film is a flashback recalled by Mathieu. It opens with Mathieu travelling by train from Seville to Paris, attempting to distance himself from his young girlfriend Conchita. As Mathieu's train prepares to depart, he discovers a bruised and bandaged Conchita pursuing him. Pouring a bucket of water over her head from the train, he believes this will deter her, but she sneaks aboard.

Mathieu's fellow compartment passengers witness his rude act, including a mother and her young daughter, a judge—who is, coincidentally, a friend of Mathieu's cousin—and a psychologist who is a dwarf. They inquire about his motivation for such an act, and he explains the history of his tumultuous relationship with Conchita, set against a backdrop of terrorist bombings and shootings by left-wing groups.

Conchita, who claims to be 18 but appears older, has vowed to remain a virgin until marriage. She tantalizes Mathieu with sexual promises but never allows him to satisfy his desires. At one point, she goes to bed with him wearing a tightly laced canvas corset, which he cannot untie, rendering intercourse impossible. In another scene, he discovers her hiding a young man in her room. Conchita's antics cause the couple to break up and reunite repeatedly, frustrating and confusing Mathieu.

Eventually, Mathieu finds Conchita dancing nude for tourists in a Seville nightclub. Initially enraged, he later forgives her and buys her a house. In a climactic scene, after moving into the house, Conchita refuses to let Mathieu in at the gate, expressing her hatred for him and claiming that physical contact with him sickens her. She then appears to initiate sexual intercourse with a young man in plain view of Mathieu, although he walks away without witnessing the act. Later that night, he is held up at gunpoint as his car is hijacked.

Afterward, Conchita attempts to reconcile with Mathieu, insisting that the sex was fake and that her "lover" is, in reality, a homosexual friend. However, during her explanation, Mathieu beats her, causing her bandaged and bruised state seen earlier in the film.

As the fellow train passengers seem satisfied with this story, Conchita reappears from hiding and dumps a bucket of water on Mathieu. Despite this, the couple apparently reconcile once more as the train reaches its destination. Upon leaving the train, they walk arm in arm, enjoying the streets of Madrid.

Later, in a Paris mall, loudspeakers announce that a strange alliance of extremist groups intends to sow chaos and confusion in society through terrorist attacks. The announcement adds that several right-wing groups plan to counter-attack. As the couple continues their walk, they pass a seamstress in a shop window mending a bloody nightgown. They begin arguing just as a bomb explodes, apparently killing them.

== Casting ==
That Obscure Object of Desire is most notable for its use of two actresses, Carole Bouquet and Ángela Molina, in the single role of Conchita; the actresses switch roles in alternate scenes and sometimes even in the middle of scenes. In his autobiography, My Last Sigh (1983), Buñuel explains (pp. 46–47) the decision to use two actresses to play Conchita:

In 1977, in Madrid, when I was in despair after a tempestuous argument with an actress who'd brought the shooting of That Obscure Object of Desire to a halt, the producer, Serge Silberman, decided to abandon the film altogether. The considerable financial loss was depressing us both until one evening, when we were drowning our sorrows in a bar, I suddenly had the idea (after two dry martinis) of using two actresses in the same role, a tactic that had never been tried before. Although I made the suggestion as a joke, Silberman loved it, and the film was saved.

The book does not identify the actress who had caused the "tempestuous argument," though Buñuel makes it clear (p. 250) that she was neither Carole Bouquet nor Angela Molina.

In Luis Buñuel: The Complete Films (2005), editors Bill Krohn and Paul Duncan identify the actress as Maria Schneider, writing (pp. 177–78) the following in regard to the idea of using two actresses to play Conchita:

... Buñuel found himself proposing it to Silberman when it became clear after three days of shooting that Maria Schneider was indeed not going to be able to play the part. Carole Bouquet and Angela Molina stepped in ...

Specifically regarding Buñuel's employment of two actresses to play a single character, most critics were charmed, as exemplified by New York Times film critic Vincent Canby's review:

Conchita is so changeable that Buñuel has cast two lovely new actresses to play her—Carole Bouquet, who looks a little like a young Rita Hayworth, as the coolly enigmatic Conchita, and Angela Molina as the earthy, flamenco-dancing Conchita [...] the Conchita who goes into the bathroom to change, changes not only her clothes. Miss Bouquet goes in but Miss Molina comes out. [...] Miss Bouquet and Miss Molina are enchanting—I don't think Buñuel has ever before been so successful with neophyte actresses.

Apart from That Obscure Object of Desire, other films that employ two or more actors to perform a single character include Todd Solondz's Palindromes, wherein eight different actors of different ages, races, and genders play a 13-year-old girl named Aviva during the course of the film; Terry Gilliam's The Imaginarium of Doctor Parnassus, where similarly a production issue—in this case the death of Heath Ledger during production—led to Johnny Depp, Colin Farrell and Jude Law stepping in to play his character's "imaginary world" scenes; and Canadian filmmaker B. P. Paquette's Perspective, wherein each of the three lead actors continually rotate the three characters they play, not only within the same scene, but sometimes during the same dialogue exchange. In the 2007 film, I'm Not There, six actors and actresses played real historical figures or artists (and some are wholly fictional characters) inspired by the music and many lives of Bob Dylan's public personae.

Spanish actor Fernando Rey frequently worked with Buñuel in his later years. He plays Mathieu, but his voice is dubbed by the French actor Michel Piccoli.

Ángela Molina revealed Luis Buñuel needed to see her completely naked during the audition. "There were nude scenes, and I imagine he needed convincing that I was what he required for his film, or whatever. He had to see the way I looked. I was wearing the same dressing gown that appeared in the film. He put his glasses on. It was a long changing room, and he was at one end of it, and then he said, with an absolutely loving and affectionately paternal smile... let's see, I don't remember what exact word he used, but I knew I had to expose myself. So, I opened my dressing gown for a moment like a little girl, because that's what I was. I was very innocent at that time. And then he put his glasses on immediately and said: 'Cover yourself! Cover yourself!' All this as though they were uncovering Tutankhamun's mummy", Molina laughing recalled.

== Reception ==
=== Critical response ===
That Obscure Object of Desire was not financially successful, but it became a critical favorite. Many later critics have declared the film a masterpiece. The film holds a 97% approval rating on Rotten Tomatoes, with an average rating of 8.8/10 among 35 critics. The site's consensus reads: "That Obscure Object of Desire is a frequently unsettling treatise on the quixotic nature of lust and love". Metacritic assigned the film a weighted average score of 84 out of 100, based on five critics, indicating "universal acclaim". In the British Film Institute's 2012 Sight & Sound poll, three critics and two directors ranked it one of the ten greatest films ever made.

== Home media ==
The U.S. version of That Obscure Object of Desire was released on VHS by The International Collection in 1986.

On 15 November 2001, the film was released via DVD by The Criterion Collection and was subsequently re-released five days later on the same medium.

That Obscure Object of Desire was released via DigiPack as a part of StudioCanal Collection by Studio Canal in France on 23 October 2012.

On 15 March 2017, Eagle Pictures released Italian version of That Obscure Object of Desire on Blu-ray disc.

The film was released via Blu-ray on 29 January 2013 in the United States as part of the StudioCanal Collection from Lionsgate Films.

In Germany, That Obscure Object of Desire was released on Blu-ray and DigiBook through Studio Canal on 23 October 2014 and on 20 September 2012, respectively.

In January 2021, the film was released as part of the Three-film Collection by The Criterion Collection with The Discreet Charm of the Bourgeoisie and The Phantom of Liberty being the other two.

A DigiPack version of the film was announced by The Criterion Collection for the U.S. distribution, but the release date for it is not yet known.

=== Accolades ===
That Obscure Object of Desire garnered Best Foreign Language Film nominations at both the Golden Globe Awards and the Academy Awards (where it was also nominated for Best Writing, Screenplay Based on Material from Another Medium) but failed to win at either. The critics associations were slightly more generous, with the National Board of Review and the Los Angeles Film Critics Association both giving it the Best Foreign Language Film awards in 1977. Luis Buñuel won Best Director at the National Board of Review and National Society of Film Critics awards. He was also nominated at the French César Awards.

== See also ==
- List of submissions to the 50th Academy Awards for Best Foreign Language Film
- List of Spanish submissions for the Academy Award for Best Foreign Language Film

== Sources ==
- That Obscure Object of Desire, DVD, The Criterion Collection; Jean-Claude Carrière Interview (2000)
