= Someone to Love (1987 film) =

1987 film by Henry Jaglom

- Directed by: Henry Jaglom
- Written by: Henry Jaglom
- Produced by: Michael Jaglom; M. H. Simonson; Judith Wolinsky
- Starring: Orson Welles; Henry Jaglom; Andrea Marcovicci; Michael Emil; Sally Kellerman
- Cinematography: Hanania Baer
- Distributed by: Castle Hill Productions Inc.
- Release date: 1987
- Running time: 111 minutes
- Country: United States
- Language: English

Someone to Love is a 1987 American comedy film directed by Henry Jaglom. It was Orson Welles' final live action film appearance, released two years after his death but produced before his voiceover in The Transformers: The Movie, his final film performance.

The film was screened in the Un Certain Regard section at the 1987 Cannes Film Festival.

== Plot ==
The film is a pseudo-documentary about a filmmaker who throws a Valentine's Day party at an old theater that is about to be demolished. The filmmaker invites numerous single friends, including his brother, the real estate agent who sold the theater to a developer who is going to build a modern shopping mall, to the party and then quizzes them on camera about their lives, failed relationships, intimacy issues, and loneliness.

== Cast ==
- Orson Welles as Danny's Friend
- Henry Jaglom as Danny Sapir
- Andrea Marcovicci as Helene Eugene
- Michael Emil as Mickey Sapir
- Sally Kellerman as Edith Helm
- Oja Kodar as Yolena
- Stephen Bishop as Blue
- Ronee Blakley as Attendee
- Kathryn Harrold as Attendee - Kathryn
- Monte Hellman as Attendee - Richard
- David Frishberg as Harry
- Miles Kreuger as Theatre Manager
- Bjorke Andersun as Truck Driver

== Critical reception ==
Walter Goodman of The New York Times wrote in his review, "If you haven't been in a roomful of chatter about relationships lately and are aching for the experience, Someone to Love may be just the cure. Watching this latest effort of Henry Jaglom, who makes movies that feature his friends and relatives, is the next best thing to being trapped in a 1960's encounter session with people you'd just as soon not encounter."

== See also ==
- Your Name Here – a 2015 Canadian docufiction film directed by B. P. Paquette featuring dozens of amateur actors and that examines the art and craft of movie acting, and the desire for movie stardom.
- Hello Cinema – a 1995 Iranian docufiction film directed by Mohsen Makhmalbaf that shows various everyday people being auditioned and explaining their reason for wanting to act in a film.
- Filming Othello – a 1978 documentary film directed by and starring Orson Welles about the making of his award-winning 1952 production Othello.
- F for Fake – the last major film completed by Orson Welles, who directed, co-wrote, and starred in the film, which is loosely a documentary that operates in several different genres and has been described as a kind of film essay.
