= Hello Cinema =

1995 film by Mohsen Makhmalbaf

- Directed by: Mohsen Makhmalbaf
- Written by: Mohsen Makhmalbaf
- Produced by: A. Lavasani; Abbas Randjbar
- Cinematography: Mahmoud Kalari
- Edited by: Mohsen Makhmalbaf
- Release date: 14 April 1995
- Running time: 75 minutes
- Country: Iran
- Language: Persian

Hello Cinema (Persian: سلام سینما, romanized: Salaam Cinema) is a 1995 Iranian film directed by Mohsen Makhmalbaf. It was screened in the Un Certain Regard section at the 1995 Cannes Film Festival. It was made for the celebration of the 100th anniversary of cinema. The year 1895 is considered the debut of the motion picture as an entertainment medium. The year 1895 was the year of the first film screenings by Auguste and Louis Lumière.

Made in a fashion to resemble a documentary, the film starts with the music of the "Dance of Spring" by Shahrdad Rohani, showing a huge crowd of people gathering outside a studio. Makhmalbaf has put an advertisement in the papers, asking for 100 actors, and thousands have shown up. The film goes on to show different people being auditioned and each explaining their reason for wanting to act in a film.

== Plot ==
A well-known Iranian director, Mohsen Makhmalbaf, plans to make a film for the celebration of the 100th anniversary of cinema. He placed an advertisement in a newspaper in order to hire one hundred actors. He has prepared 1000 application forms, but 5000 people show up. The result is a riot in which the applicants are trampled on and wounded. Mohsen Makhmalbaf auditions dozens of men and women in front of the camera; their statements, which are by turns funny and touching, reveal the reality of life in Iran. Thus, the director enables us to see and understand those intellectuals, students and children and above all the women, who can not normally be heard or seen. It shows, once again, that cinema is of vital importance in countries such as Iran.

== Cast ==
- M. H. Mokhtarian - Himself
- Mirhadi Tayebi - Himself
- Azadeh Zanganeh - Herself
- Moharram Zaynalzadeh - Himself

== See also ==
- Your Name Here – a 2015 Canadian docufiction film directed by B. P. Paquette featuring dozens of amateur actors and that examines the art and craft of movie acting, and the desire for movie stardom.
- Someone to Love - a 1987 pseudo-documentary directed by Henry Jaglom about a filmmaker who throws a Valentine's Day party at an old movie theater that is about to be demolished and then quizzes his guests on camera about their lives.
- Filming Othello – a 1978 documentary film directed by and starring Orson Welles about the making of his award-winning 1952 production Othello.
- F for Fake – the last major film completed by Orson Welles, who directed, co-wrote, and starred in the film, which is loosely a documentary that operates in several different genres and has been described as a kind of film essay.
