= Filming The Trial =

Unfinished film directed by Orson Welles

- Directed by: Orson Welles
- Written by: Orson Welles
- Produced by: Orson Welles
- Starring: Orson Welles
- Cinematography: Gary Graver
- Running time: 82 mins
- Country: United States
- Language: English

Filming 'The Trial' is an unfinished making-of film by Orson Welles, made in 1981, which focuses on the production of his 1962 film The Trial.

== Background ==
In 1978 Orson Welles directed Filming Othello. That film had mostly consisted of a monologue in which Welles discussed his 1952 adaptation of Othello. Encouraged by the result, he set out to make a similar documentary/essay film looking back at his own film of The Trial.

== Filming ==
In 1981, Welles gave a 90-minute question-and-answer session at the University of Southern California after a screening of The Trial. He had his cinematographer Gary Graver film the session with a view to editing highlights of the footage into the projected film. Graver observed, "A lot of people were there in the audience that day who are successful filmmakers now", as well as several noted film critics such as Joseph McBride and Todd McCarthy.

However, Welles never got round to editing the raw footage. Its only use in Welles' lifetime was by BBC journalist Leslie Megahy for his 1982 Arena documentary on Welles; specifically, the documentary features a young man asking Welles whether he would agree he has been persecuted by The Establishment and the capitalist system, and Welles being somewhat bemused by the question.

== Revival of the footage ==
After Orson Welles' death in 1985, all of his unfinished films were bequeathed to his long-term companion Oja Kodar, and she in turn donated many of them (including Filming 'The Trial') to the Munich Film Museum for preservation and restoration.

In the 2000s, the Munich Film Museum then edited together the complete footage into an 82-minute cut of the Q&A session. Since Graver had to change film cartridges approximately every 10 minutes, this created breaks in filming, which are noticeable in the final cut.

The restored footage has been screened at various film festivals, and was finally released on home media in 2023 as a bonus on the Criterion Blu-ray of The Trial. The work is in the public domain, and is available on YouTube in its full length.
