= A Year in the Death of Jack Richards =

- Directed by: B. P. Paquette
- Written by: B. P. Paquette
- Produced by: B. P. Paquette
- Starring: Vlasta Vrána; Micheline Lanctôt; Harry Hill; Darryl Hunter
- Cinematography: Daniel Breton
- Edited by: Andrew David
- Music by: Andrew David
- Production company: Ourson Films
- Distributed by: Ourson Films
- Release date: September 26, 2004 (Cinéfest Sudbury International Film Festival)
- Running time: 85 minutes
- Country: Canada
- Language: English

A Year in the Death of Jack Richards is a 2004 Canadian psychological drama film featuring Vlasta Vrána as the title character, a professor of theology, who may or may not have made himself the target of a supposed cult, whose members then worship him for a year so that they may kill him as an atonement for their sins. An English-language feature film shot and set in Montreal, it is the debut feature film from Canadian director B. P. Paquette, and also features in supporting roles Micheline Lanctôt, Harry Hill, and Darryl Hunter.

Presented at numerous film festivals in countries from around the world, and honoured with prizes and accolades, A Year in the Death of Jack Richards absolutely polarized critics when it was released in commercial theatres.

A Year in the Death of Jack Richards is the first panel in Paquette's triptych on the psychology of romantic love, followed by The Woman of Ahhs: A Self-Portrait by Victoria Fleming (2008), and The Anonymous Rudy S. (2016).

== Production ==
Paquette has discussed two avenues that led to the development of his story. The first was that of a 15th century European legend, in which religious sects took individuals to be cared for, for a year before being killed. The second is closer to Paquette's past. "I came to film school ... to do my Bachelor's and while I was there I got to know the director of the program. He was this old Polish guy, single, very kind of gruff," Paquette says. "I loved him to death. He was the smartest film guy I ever had and I didn't know a lot of people in Montreal so I took to hanging out with him. He wouldn't really open up to a lot about his past but you'd get little bits of it and you start to piece it together. He'd given up a lot in Poland to come here."

== Interpretations and allusions ==
Blurring the lines between reality and fiction, A Year in the Death of Jack Richards is an open-ended film that is vague and evasive but completely up for discussion. In interviews, Paquette has stated that it was his intention to make a film that is open to different interpretations. Even Vlasta Vrána, who played Jack Richards, said, "Don't ask me about the film because I don't know anything. I know what got me through making it, doing my part. [...] I had the story, I had the idea of what it is, I know what I took as my motivations—I know that the story is much more complex than what I took for myself."

== Festival recognition ==
Between 2004 and 2007, A Year in the Death of Jack Richards was presented at numerous film festivals in countries from around the world, including the USA, the UK, Ireland, Sweden, Canada, Chile, Romania, etc., and was honoured with many prizes and accolades, including a nomination for Best First Feature Film from the prestigious International Federation of Film Critics (FIPRESCI), the Best Feature Film award from the Festival of Fantastic Films (UK), and the Grand Jury prize from the DeadCENTER Film Festival.

== Theatrical release ==
In 2006, A Year in the Death of Jack Richards received a limited commercial release in theatres across Canada.

== Critical response ==
The film received negative to mixed reviews, however in Quebec, where the film was shot, the film received positive reviews.

== Awards and nominations ==
- 2004, Nomination for Best Canadian Feature Film at Cinéfest Sudbury International Film Festival
- 2005, Won the Best Independent Feature Award at the Festival of Fantastic Films (UK)
- 2005, Nomination for FIPRESCI Prize for Best First Feature Film at the Transylvania International Film Festival
- 2005, Won the Grand Jury Award at The DeadCENTER Film Festival
- 2005, Won the Richard Kind Award for Best Actor at the Trenton Film Festival for Vlasta Vrana
