= Violet (2000 film) =

2000 Canadian comedy film

- Directed by: Rosemary House
- Written by: Rosemary House
- Produced by: Mary Sexton
- Starring: Mary Walsh; Peter MacNeill; Andrew Younghusband; Susan Kent
- Cinematography: Ivan Gekoff
- Edited by: Trevor Ambrose
- Music by: Paul Steffler
- Production companies: Dark Flowers; Alliance Atlantis
- Release date: August 27, 2000 (FFM)
- Running time: 105 minutes
- Country: Canada
- Language: English

Violet is a Canadian comedy film, directed by Rosemary House and released in 2000. The film stars Mary Walsh as Violet O'Brien, a 54-year-old widow who is convinced that she is going to die within the next year because her parents and her older brother all died at age 55.

The cast also includes Andrew Younghusband as Violet's son Carlos, a gay university professor visiting from his academic job in Montreal and trying to teach everybody to speak Italian; Barry Newhook as her son Rex, a deadbeat musician; Susan Kent as her daughter Ramona, a potter; and Peter MacNeill as Rusty, a hired hand with a romantic interest in Violet; as well as Berni Stapleton, Janis Spence, Raoul Bhaneja, Janet Michael, Maisie Rillie, Sherry White, Bryan Hennessey, Ron Hynes and Jody Richardson in supporting roles.

== Distribution ==
The film premiered at the 2000 Montreal World Film Festival, and was subsequently screened at the 2000 Atlantic Film Festival.

Due to the challenges facing independent films in that era, House bought back the film's commercial distribution rights from Alliance Atlantis, and independently organized a commercial run beginning in St. John's in November and expanding to the Toronto, Montreal and Vancouver markets in December.

== Critical response ==
Liam Lacey of The Globe and Mail wrote that "the results are wobbly. There are moments, near the beginning of the film, when Walsh appears to be the main character in a Scandinavian identity-crisis drama. By the conclusion, however, Violet turns into a madcap farce, with a dozen subplots resolving all at once. Predictably, the pacing from scene to scene is wildly uneven and the performers are occasionally required to make impossible shifts in tone, from sitcom wisecracking to tearful confessions. The underlying fault here is House's desire to do too much at once."

Scott MacDonald of the National Post wrote that "tt's amiable, amusing stuff mostly, with a lot of very appealing performances, but it's also a very slim premise for a feature. When House resorts to cartoon subplots involving a horrid relative's comic attempts to bump Violet off for an inheritance, the strain starts to show."

For the Toronto Star, Geoff Pevere wrote that "sometimes it works, as director House draws uniformly likeable performances from her large cast, and sometimes you just wish everybody would get off their complaining arses and get on with it. At least there's no mystery why, living with this lot, Violet would take to her bed for a year. Too often, this movie leaves you envying her."

== Awards ==
Tom Ronan, Daniel Pellerin, Brad Thornton and Brad Zoern received a Genie Award nomination for Best Overall Sound at the 21st Genie Awards.
