= Berni Stapleton =

Canadian writer residing in Newfoundland

Berni Stapleton is a Canadian writer residing in Newfoundland. Along with writing, Stapleton is also a performer and playwright. Her debut book, They Let Down Baskets, won the 1999 Newfoundland Book Award for Best Non-Fiction.

== Life ==
Stapleton was born in North West River and raised in Marystown. She was a playwright-in-residence with the Playwright's Workshop Montreal, Stratford Shakespeare Festival, PARC, as well as other national companies. She was also the Artistic Director of the Grand Bank Regional Theatre for eleven years. She has a production company called In Conjunction. In 2019, Stapleton was named Memorial University's writer-in-residence. She has also received a grant from the Canada Council for the Arts to write Girly Muckle and the Queer Hands.

Her roles as an actress have included the films Violet, The Bingo Robbers and Behind the Red Door.

== Works ==
=== Books ===
- They Let Down Baskets (1998)
- This is the Cat (2015)
- Rants, Riffs, and Roars (2009)
- Girly Muckle and the Queer Hands (to be released)

=== Plays and musicals ===
- No Change in the Weather
- The Pope and Princess Di
- Woman in a Monkey Cage
- Offensive to Some
- Our Frances
- Dolly
- Late Lesbians and Other Bloomers
- Mill Girls

== Awards ==
- 1999 Newfoundland Book Award for They Let Down the Baskets
- 2018 Arts and Letters Award for Best Dramatic Script for Dolly
- Rhonda Payne Award from Arts NL
- Ambassador of Tourism Award from Hospitality NL
