= Houdan =

- Commune
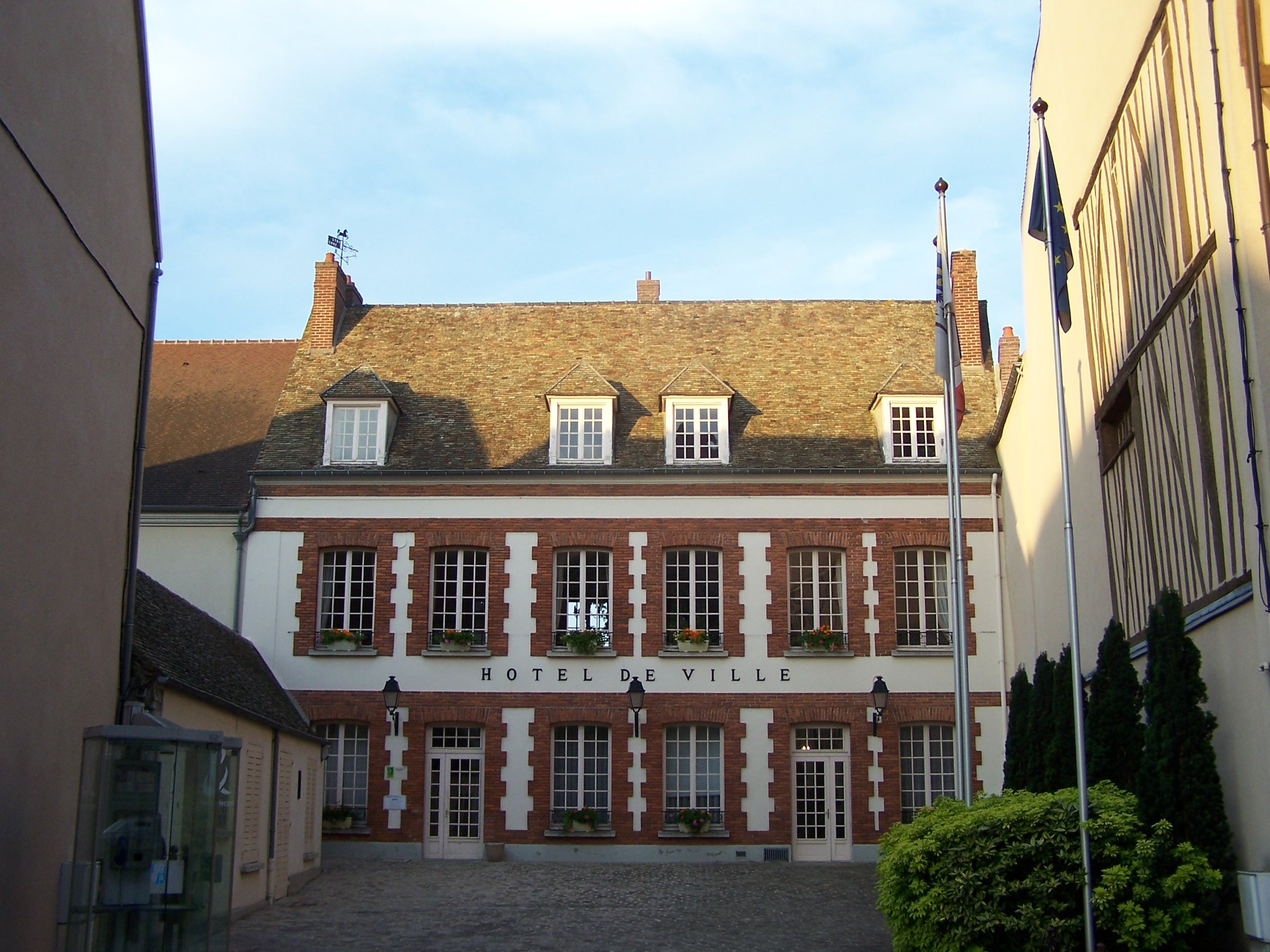
- Town hall

- Coat of arms
- Location of Houdan
- Location within France Location within Île-de-France (region)
- Coordinates: 48°47′N 1°36′E
- Country: France
- Region: Île-de-France
- Department: Yvelines
- Arrondissement: Mantes-la-Jolie
- Canton: Bonnières-sur-Seine
- Intercommunality: Pays houdanais

Government
  - Mayor (2020–2026): Jean-Marie Tétart
- Area^{1}: 10.39 km^{2} (4.01 sq mi)
- Elevation: 104 m (341 ft)
- Highest elevation: 129 m (423 ft)
- Lowest elevation: 87 m (285 ft)
- Population (2023): 3,721
  - Density: 358.1/km^{2} (927.6/sq mi)
- Time zone: UTC+01:00 (CET)
  - Summer (DST): UTC+02:00 (CEST)
- INSEE/Postal code: 78310 /78550
- ^{1} French Land Register data, which excludes lakes, ponds, glaciers > 1 km^{2} (0.386 sq mi or 247 acres) and river estuaries.

Houdan (French: [udɑ̃]) is a commune of the Yvelines department 63 kilometres (39 mi) west of Paris in the north of France.

== History ==
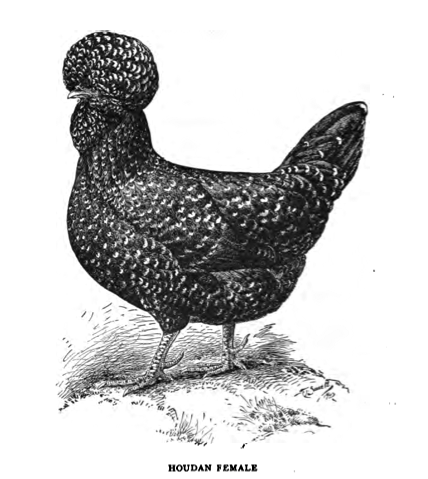
Houdan female chicken

The name has evolved from the Saxon "Hoding," meaning "settlement on the hill". Houdan is thought to have been inhabited since the 5th century. By the 12th century, two churches and a château were present.

During the Hundred Years' War, the town changed hands and was pillaged frequently. The town was destroyed; only the 12th century keep survives from that period. After the war, the town was ruled by the English until 1475.

Houdan is mentioned in the Prophecies of Nostradamus.

Houdan was a staging post on the road from Paris to Brittany, and many old inns are still standing.

Houdan was also an important poultry market for Paris and a breed is named after the town. The breed is ornamental, but is also used for its meat and white eggs.

It is the site of the Boldoflorine factory which over the years had transformed from absinthe distillery to producer of herbal remedies and tisanes. In the 2000s the factory was converted to residential use.

== Population ==
Historical population
Year	Pop.	±% p.a.
1968	2,409	—
1975	2,873	+2.55%
1982	2,973	+0.49%
1990	2,912	−0.26%
1999	3,112	+0.74%
2007	3,181	+0.27%
2012	3,381	+1.23%
2017	3,640	+1.49%
2023	3,721	+0.37%
Source: INSEE

== Infrastructure ==
Houdan station is on the train line between Dreux station in Eure-et-Loir, and the Gare Montparnasse in Paris. It is on the route nationale 12 connecting Paris with Brittany, which once passed through, but now bypasses, the town.

== Attractions ==
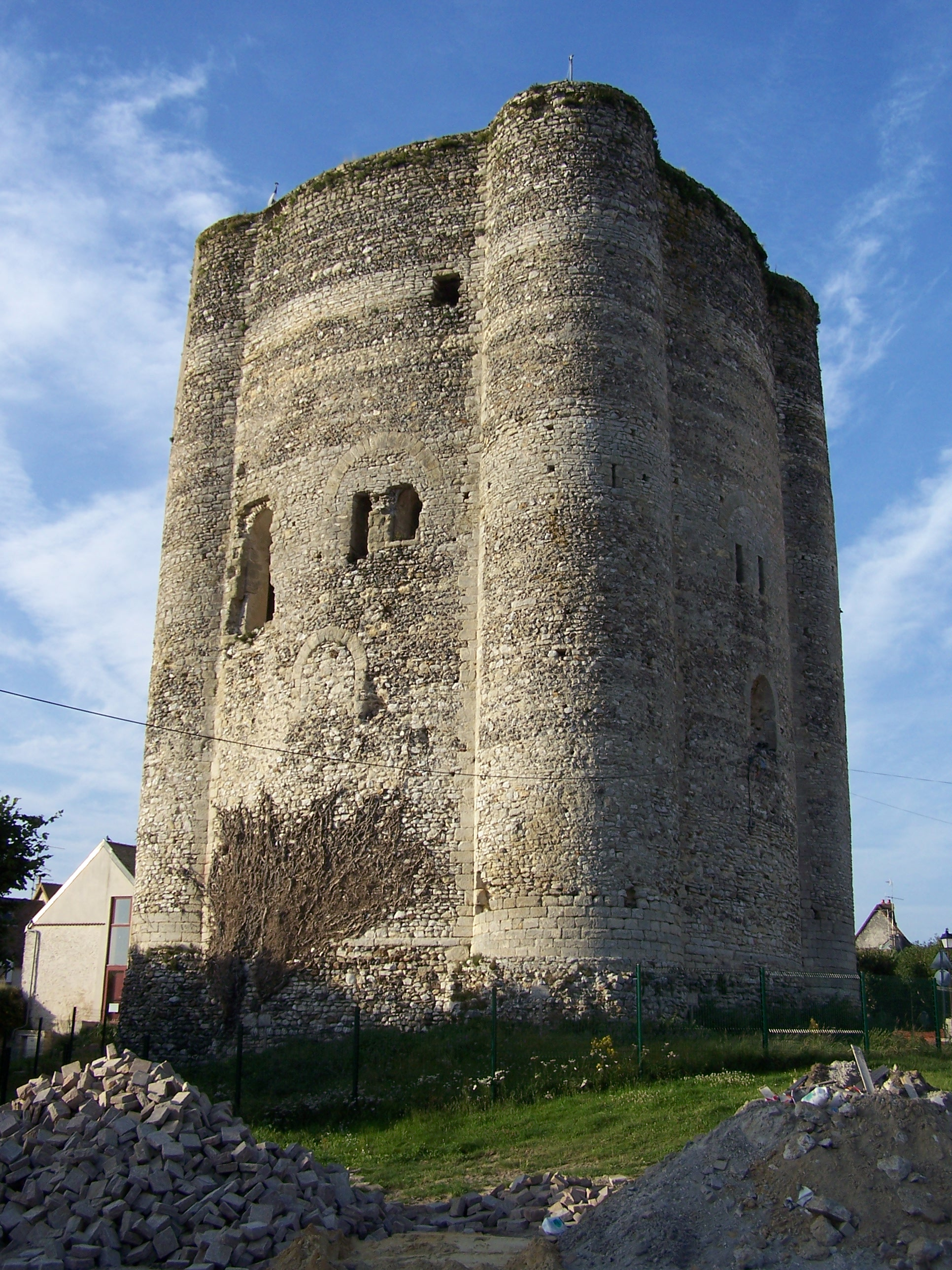
The keep

- Vestiges of the old town wall fortifications, including a keep built around 1135.
- Houses of the 15th and 16th centuries.
- Church, 15th - 17th centuries, Gothic style containing an organ (1735), and a Renaissance-style choir.

== International relations ==
Houdan is twinned with:

- Pangbourne, United Kingdom
- (Senegal) Baïla, Sénégal
