= Sudbury Symphony Orchestra =

- Short name: SSO
- Founded: 1953 (inc. 1975)
- Location: Sudbury, Ontario
- Principal conductor: Mélanie Léonard
- Website: sudburysymphony.com

The Sudbury Symphony Orchestra (SSO) is a Canadian symphony orchestra based Sudbury, Ontario. Incorporated in 1975 as a not-for-profit registered charity, the orchestra performs a season of full orchestra concerts and chamber music concerts at a variety of venues in Sudbury, including the Sanctuary of Glad Tidings Church, on Regent Street South, and Fraser Auditorium at Laurentian University.

== History ==
The orchestra was founded in 1953 as a community orchestra and gave its first public performance on January 13, 1954, conducted by Emil First at the Sudbury High School Auditorium. Eric Woodward took over as music director in 1957, and in 1962 the orchestra was merged into the Sudbury Philharmonic Society, a combined choral and orchestral ensemble. The orchestra and the choir later became separate ensembles again, with the orchestra re-constituted in 1975 under its present name.

Under Metro Kozak, the orchestra's music director from its incorporation in 1975 until his retirement in 1997, the orchestra grew to over 60 musicians with several instructors from the music programs at Laurentian University and Cambrian College serving as its permanent musicians. Kozak also founded the Sudbury Youth Orchestra to prepare future musicians for the SSO. Victor Sawa served as music director from 1997 to 2015.

In February 2016, Mélanie Léonard first guest-conducted the orchestra. On the basis of this concert, in June 2016, the orchestra announced the appointment of Léonard as its next music director, effective 1 July 2016. She is the first female conductor to be named music director of the orchestra.

== Music directors ==
- Emil First (1953–1957)
- Eric Woodward (1957–1974)
- Metro Kozak (1975–1997)
- Victor Sawa (1997–2015)
- Mélanie Léonard (2016–present)

== Conservatory of Music ==
Founded in 2001, the Sudbury Symphony increased its operations to include the Sudbury Symphony Conservatory of Music. At its peak, the Sudbury Symphony Conservatory of Music employed five teachers, with students enrolled in lessons for string instruments, as well as a Junior Music Course, a Junior String Orchestra, Cello Ensemble and Student String Quartets.

Today, the conservatory has four instructors, who teach violin, viola, and cello. There are also classes in music theory, music history, and an introduction to music (ages 2+). Students are sometimes asked to perform as members of the Sudbury Symphony during performances. As of 2018 the conservatory has partnered with Cambrian College’s Academy of Music. This is a teaching facility devoted to fostering a healthy knowledge of music to students of all ages.

== Education and outreach programs ==
- Maestro Talks
- Musical Encounters
- Share the Music
- Tunes and Tales
- Wolfie Goes to School

The Sudbury Symphony Orchestra reaches over 2,000 people in Northeastern Ontario every year through their outreach and education programs.
