= Donjon de Houdan =

Medieval fortified tower in Houdan in the Yvelines département of France

Coordinates: 48°47′21.3″N 1°35′57.3″E

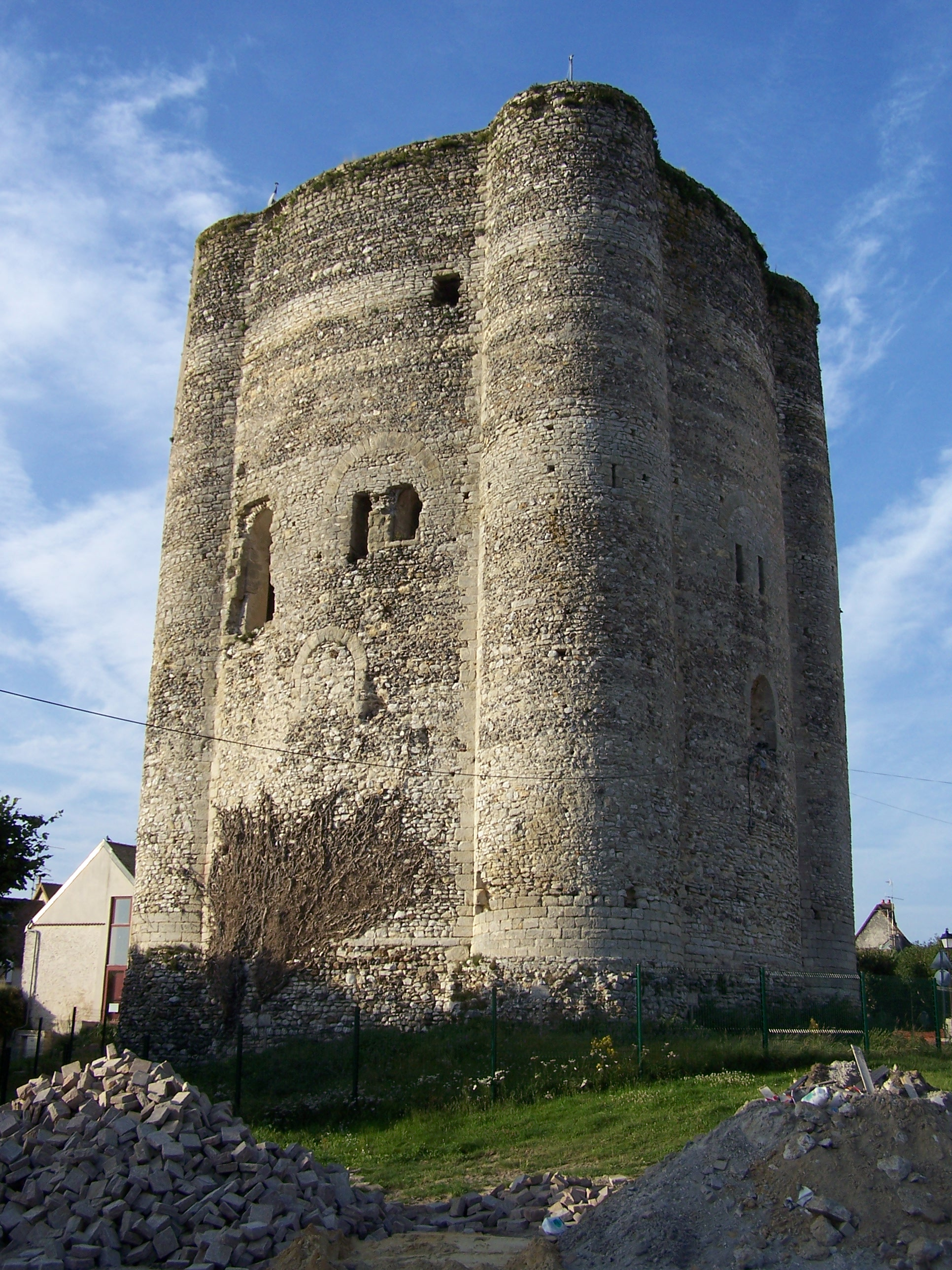
The Donjon de Houdan

The Donjon de Houdan (Houdan Keep) is a medieval fortified tower in the commune of Houdan in the Yvelines département of France.

== Architecture ==
Constructed around 1120-1137 by Amaury III of Montfort, the keep or donjon is the only vestige of the medieval castle of Houdan. It is a massive tower isolated from the town in the west, once used as a water tower.

The tower is cylindrical, 16 metres in diameter and 25 metres in height. It is flanked by four turrets 4.8 metres in diameter each at cardinal points on the central cylinder. The walls of the tower have an average thickness of three metres.

The tower consists of three levels: a ground floor, and two higher floors. The interior floors and roof have disappeared. An access door was located 6 metres above the ground level and once gave access to the mezzanine floor. Another entrance was located in one of the turrets.

The donjon is thought to have been one of the earliest experiments in improving flanking fire from the battlements (reduction of "dead ground"), and a transitional form between the rectangular keeps of the 11th to 12th centuries, and widespread adoption of cylindrical keeps in the 13th century. Other contemporary examples can be seen at Étampes and Provins.

== History ==
- 1120–1137: construction of the keep
- 1880: installation of a 200 kilolitre cistern in the keep, transforming it into a water tower (French: château d'eau)
- 1889: classified as an official historical building (French: monument historique)
- 1903: acquisition of the keep by the town of Houdan, courtesy of the last private owner, a Dr. Aulet.
- 1970: replacement water cistern built nearby
- 2014: 1.3M Euro restoration program
- 2016: reopened to the public

This tower has never been taken during its history.

== See also ==
- List of castles in France
