= B. P. Paquette =

Canadian filmmaker

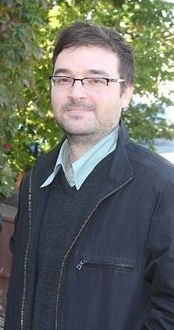
- Paquette in 2015
- Born: Benjamin Patrick Paquette; March 17, 1975 (age 51); London, Ontario, Canada
- Education: Mel Hoppenheim School of Cinema at Concordia University; Université de Montréal
- Occupation: Filmmaker
- Years active: 2004–present

Benjamin Patrick Paquette, commonly known as B. P. Paquette, is a Canadian film director, screenwriter, film producer and academic.

== Background ==
Born in London, Ontario, Paquette spent his childhood and adolescence in Greater Sudbury. Shooting his first film at age 10 and making over a dozen student shorts (including the award-winning An Uneven Scroll), Paquette produced, wrote and directed two features while still a high school student, Maxwell's Silver Hammer (1993) and A Descent Into Darkness (1994), and a third as a university student, Raining Angels (1997). Paquette then established his Montreal-based film production and distribution company, Ourson Films in 1998.

== Education ==
Paquette graduated from Concordia University's Mel Hoppenheim School of Cinema in Montreal, Quebec with B.F.A. and M.F.A. degrees, respectively, in Film Production In 2007, Paquette was accepted into the inaugural class of the Ph.D. program in Film Theory at the Université de Montréal, the first program of its kind in Canada.

== Academia and professional skills development ==
=== Academia ===
Since 2009, Paquette has been the director of, and a professor in, the Motion Picture Arts curriculum within the Bachelor of Fine Arts degree program at Thorneloe University, a federated partner of Laurentian University. Paquette was recruited to lead the establishment of an eventual film, TV and digital media production program. In 2011, Laurentian University began offering an Academic minor in Motion Picture Arts, while in 2013 it began offering an Academic major, the only one of its kind in Northern Ontario.

Paquette started his academic career in the Film & Television Production Program at Trebas Institute, a private, post-secondary college based in Montreal. From 2001 to 2009, he gave practical courses, including those regarding screenwriting and production. From 2001-2005, he also served as program director. In his capacity as such, Paquette lead the creation, development, and implementation of its current, competency-based, four-session program, which received accreditation from the Quebec Ministry of Education in 2005. Before relocating back to Greater Sudbury, Paquette taught filmmaking at the University of Montreal during the 2009-2010 academic year.

With his film Perspective, Paquette began to directly integrate his film-making pursuits with his academic interests. In effect, the film served as a teaching tool for Paquette's film production students at Laurentian University.

=== Professional skills development ===
In his capacity as both a filmmaker and educator, Paquette has been a juror at international film festivals, a guest filmmaking instructor at various professional skills development institutions, including acclaimed Cree filmmaker Shirley Cheechoo's Weengushk Film Institute, and Music and Film in Motion. Furthermore, he has been a special guest speaker at various public events, such as the Sudbury Symphony Orchestra's An Intimate Evening of Film & Music hosted by the Canadian Broadcasting Corporation, and he gave acting-on-screen workshops for the Sudbury Theatre Centre, the material of which led to his feature-length docufiction Your Name Here. Like Perspective, Your Name Here directly integrates Paquette's cinema experiments with his interests in education.

In 2011, Paquette co-founded the Greater Sudbury-based not-for-profit company Northern Ontario Motion Picture Culture and Industry Development Corporation (NOMPCIDC, pronounced "Nomp-see-dik"), whose mandate is to develop and promote the film and television industry in Northern Ontario. In 2012, NOMPCIDC launched Xanadu Studios, an equipment rental depot and post-production facility that services professional film and TV projects in Northern Ontario. Sound stages, for professional and training purposes, are currently in development.

Since 2012, NOMPCIDC has partnered with Thorneloe University to offer film and TV production workshops for students. In 2016, the Northern Ontario Heritage Fund corporation (NOHFC) announced that it had partnered with NOMPCIDC and Thorneloe to offer these workshops. Students enrolled in the Motion Picture Arts (MPArts) curriculum within Thorneloe's Bachelor of Fine Arts (BFA) degree program can register for the workshops, which are a comprehensive, practice-based educational supplement. "It's to encourage students that they don't need millions of dollars, big movie stars and huge crews to make films", said Paquette. The general outcome of the production workshops is that students experience working under the guidance of professional filmmakers in a professional context, which will allow students to further develop and gain more confidence in their practical work skills, receive credit for their work that they can add to their resume, network with professional filmmakers, and receive a reference letters from a professional filmmakers under whom they shadowed and/or assisted.

== Filmmaking ==
Paquette creates films for himself rather than a target audience. "You can't make a film for anyone but yourself," said Paquette.

In 2008, Paquette co-founded the Greater Sudbury-based production and distribution company Nortario Films. In addition to producing films written and directed by Paquette, Nortario Films also produces films by other filmmakers, including Nadia Litz's dramatic thriller The People Garden, and Darwin (2015 film), a science fiction family film.

Acclaimed Bulgaria-born Canadian cinematographer Ivan Gekoff has collaborated with Paquette on all five of his feature films, three as cinematographer and two as visual consultant.

=== Triptych on "The Psychology of Romantic Love" ===
Paquette made his professional filmmaking debut with the international award-winning and critically polarizing A Year in the Death of Jack Richards, the first part of his trilogy on "the psychology of romantic love." This was followed with The Woman of Ahhs: A Self-Portrait by Victoria Fleming, and concludes with The Anonymous Rudy S.

=== Perspective ===
In 2012, Paquette unveiled the first of the nine chapters that comprise Perspective, his most innovative and experimental film to date. All nine chapters, titled, respectively, Chapter 1: Salt & Soda (2012), Chapter 2: Chris and Other Beards (2013), Chapter 3: Hush, hsuH (2014), Chapter 4: Reflecting (2015), Chapter 5: Triangulation (2016), Chapter 6: The Saddest Lines (2017), Chapter 7: Me, Myself, and I (2018), Chapter 8: Marital Accumulation (2019), and The Shed of Theseus (2020) were completed by 2020.

=== Your Name Here ===
Set in a movie theatre as a workshop for amateur actors, Your Name Here is Paquette's feature-length docufiction that examines the art and craft of movie acting, and the desire for movie stardom. Your Name Here features various aspiring actors who reveal their true selves while simultaneously reenacting the Oscar-winning Hollywood classic A Star is Born (1937 film).

=== Beautiful Accidents ===
Beautiful Accidents is a 2019 Canadian feature-length comedy metafilm adapted and directed by Paquette from an original screenplay by Amanda M. Darling. Blurring fact and fiction, the film follows an indie film crew shooting a cheesy romantic comedy.

== Filmography ==
Title	Year	Director	Writer	Producer	notes
A Year in the Death of Jack Richards	2004	Yes	Yes	Yes	feature fiction
The Woman of Ahhs: A Self-Portrait by Victoria Fleming	2008	Yes	Yes	Yes	feature fiction
Perspective	2012-2020	Yes	Yes	Yes	feature fiction
Your Name Here	2019	Yes	Yes	Yes	feature docufiction
The Anonymous Rudy S.	2019	Yes	Yes	Yes	feature fiction
Beautiful Accidents	2019	Yes	Yes	Yes	feature

== Recognition ==
=== Awards and nominations ===
- 2004, Nomination, Best Canadian Feature Film at Cinéfest Sudbury International Film Festival for A Year in the Death of Jack Richards
- 2005, Won Best Independent Feature Award at the Festival of Fantastic Films (UK) for A Year in the Death of Jack Richards
- 2005, Nomination, FIPRESCI Prize for Best First Feature Film at the Transylvania International Film Festival for A Year in the Death of Jack Richards
- 2005, Won Grand Jury Award at The DeadCENTER Film Festival for A Year in the Death of Jack Richards
- 2008, Nomination, Grand Prix Focus at the Festival du nouveau cinéma for The Woman of Ahhs: A Self-Portrait by Victoria Fleming
- 2009, Won Bronze Palm Award at the Mexico International Film Festival for The Woman of Ahhs: A Self-Portrait by Victoria Fleming
- 2009, Nomination, Best Canadian Feature Film at Cinéfest Sudbury International Film Festival for The Woman of Ahhs: A Self-Portrait by Victoria Fleming
- 2009, Nomination, Best Non-European Dramatic Feature at ÉCU The European Independent Film Festival for The Woman of Ahhs: A Self-Portrait by Victoria Fleming
