= DeadCENTER Film Festival =

American film festival

deadCenter Film Festival
- Founded: 2000
- Language: English
- Website: deadcenterfilm.org

The deadCenter Film Festival was founded in 2001 in Oklahoma City. The festival was named "deadCenter" because it is located in the exact center of the United States. Although presenting over a hundred films, and an international assemblage of filmmakers, deadCenter has remained focused on being open to independent local filmmakers.

The festival runs for five days every year in June and has attracted notable actors including Spike Jonze and Rinko Kikuchi. The deadCenter Film Festival was named one of the 20 Coolest Film Festivals of 2010 by MovieMaker magazine.

== Founding and early years ==
In the spring of 2000, filmmakers and brothers Jayson Floyd and Justan Floyd traveled to Muskogee, Oklahoma, for the inaugural Bare Bones Film Festival. Sharon Ray, a film producer, educator, and entrepreneur who had grown up splitting time between Muskogee and Los Angeles, launched the festival so that she and her husband could meet other filmmakers, share best practices, and increase their knowledge of the film industry. The Floyd brothers loved the festival, but believed it could better serve the Oklahoma film community if it were based in Oklahoma City.

In the following June, the Floyds launched their own festival at the Oklahoma Contemporary space at the State Fair grounds. The festival's name, "deadCenter", is a reference to the festival's location in the United States and it being held "dead center" of the calendar year. That first year, most of the films were short films made in Oklahoma. The Floyds' mother cooked hotdogs and set up concessions. The community of filmmakers created in the first year of the festival is said to have established a solid foundation for Oklahoma's film industry.

After moving deadCenter to the University of Central Oklahoma for its second year, the Floyds took a step back and gave the administrative rights and organization of the festival to Cacky Poarch and Melissa Scaramucci. In the third year of the festival, Cacky Poarch, Melissa Scaramucci, Brian Hearn, Geoffrey L. Smith and deadCenter co-founder Justan Floyd moved the festival to downtown Oklahoma City, where it has remained ever since.

== Executive directors ==
After being incorporated as a non-profit in 2004, the festival had many executive directors.

- Cacky Poarch: 2004–2010
- Lance McDaniel: 2010–2020
- Alyx Picard Davis: 2020–2021
- Cacky Poarch: 2022–2025
- Amy Janes: 2025–2026
