= Cinéfest Sudbury International Film Festival =

Film festival in Sudbury, Ontario, Canada

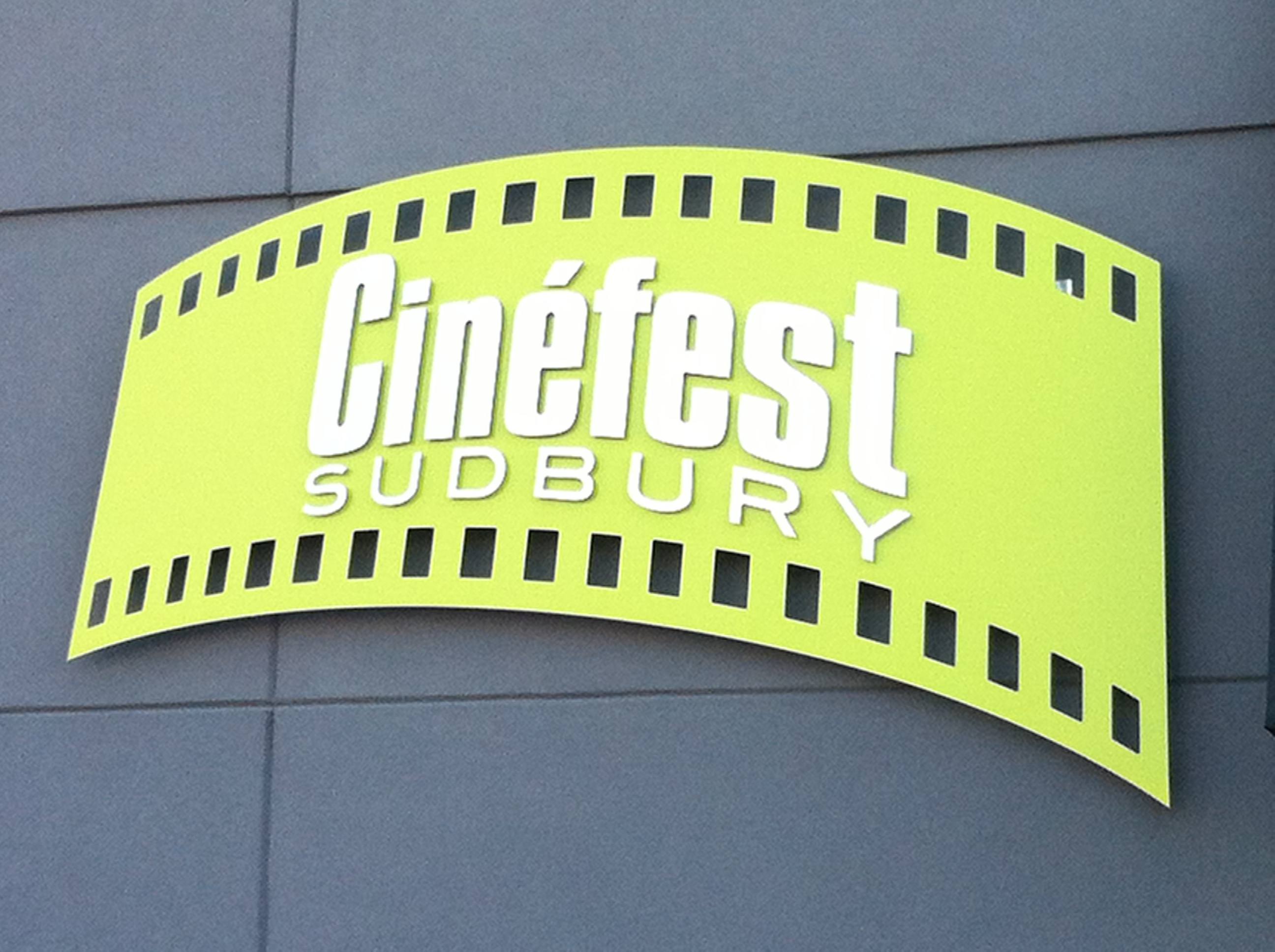
- Frequency: Annual
- Locations: 40 Larch Street; Unit 103; Sudbury, Ontario; P3E 5M7
- Years active: 35
- Inaugurated: 1989
- Attendance: 32,000+
- People: Cam Haynes (executive director, 1989-1995); Tammy Frick (executive director, 1995-2022); Patrick O'Hearn (executive director, 2023-present)
- Website: www.cinefest.com

Cinéfest Sudbury International Film Festival, also known as Cinéfest and Cinéfest Sudbury, is an annual film festival in Greater Sudbury, Ontario, Canada, held over nine days each September. It is one of the largest film festivals in Canada.

First held in 1989, Cinéfest quickly became a popular destination for Canadian filmmakers. Unlike the larger film festivals in Toronto, Montreal, and Vancouver, Cinéfest offers filmmakers a chance to gain exposure among more typical film audiences in a city which, at the time of the festival's launch in 1989, had never previously had any regular venues for screening independent, international, and non-mainstream films. Cinéfest presents an annual program of over 135 films, both domestic and international, often screened for both English and French language audiences.

In 2022, the festival's longtime executive director Tammy Frick was named the new chief executive officer of the Academy of Canadian Cinema and Television. The festival's longtime managing director Patrick O'Hearn was named the new executive director of Cinéfest Sudbury following the departure of Tammy Frick.

Cinéfest is a qualifying film festival for the Canadian Screen Awards.

== History ==
Patricia Rozema's I've Heard the Mermaids Singing was presented in Sudbury in 1988 at a special test screening. Planned as a onetime event, Sudbury was being used as a test market for alternative Canadian films in communities outside of Canada's top metropolitan markets. The result surprised everyone, with over 900 people attending the sold out screening. Cinéfest Sudbury International Film Festival was established a year later in 1989 as the Sudbury Film Festival, and despite some remaining skepticism, local citizens proved that the city could be receptive to repertory film culture, as approximately 9,000 cinema buffs crowded theatres during the three-day event. The event proved so popular, in fact, that despite having booked opening gala Jesus of Montreal in a 600-seat hall rather than a movie theatre, 1,500 people lined up for the screening and the festival had to quickly add two follow-up screenings. Founding director Cameron Haynes noted that not even the Toronto International Film Festival had been as wildly popular in its first year of operation.

By 1993, Cinéfest evolved into a full-service film organization, with the festival growing to include upwards of 60 films over five days. Cinéfest Sudbury has become recognized as one of Canada's premiere film festivals. The festival has developed a distinct identity and role within its community and the media arts industry, winning provincial and national acclaim. It is administrated by the non-profit Cultural Industries Ontario North.

=== Northern Film Circuit ===
Cinéfest Sudbury has a long history of promoting Canadian cinema and supporting the local film industry. One of the organization's most ambitious projects was the establishment of the Northern Film Circuit (NFC) in 1992. An attempt to build audiences in Northern Ontario for Canadian and international film, the NFC began with only four members. The NFC was eventually used as a model for the Film Circuit, which was developed in partnership with the Toronto International Film Festival and now operates in over 110 communities throughout Ontario.

Haynes left Cinéfest in 1995 to head up the larger TIFF Film Circuit, and was succeeded by Frick.

=== Northern Connections ===
Constantly working to bring knowledge to the north, Cinéfest introduced Industry Forum to the Festival's framework in 2003, an initiative that has since provided emerging and mid-career film artists with access to key film representatives, and invited partnerships between Festival, industry and educational institutions. Since the introduction of industry forum, Cinéfest has established itself as a focal point for independent filmmakers, and programmers. While the festival has a long history of presenting and supporting films that represent the output of Canada's independent film artists, Cinéfest Sudbury has also over the years extended significant support to its regional film artists. Through programs such as Northern Connections (introduced in 2003), a program which highlights the best and brightest of regional film talent, and the CTV Best in Shorts Competition, which has awarded over $92,000 in cash prizes to up-and-coming regional film talent since it was established in 2001, the festival has served as a place for regional artists to have their work seen and celebrated.

=== Mini-festivals ===
Since the overwhelming success of Cinéfest Sudbury in 2003, which saw 80 per cent of festival screenings either reach or exceed capacity, festival organizers have worked aggressively to ensure accessibility for its audiences. The Festival Expansion Initiative was developed and launched in 2004, through which the festival was expanded from six to nine days. A plan was also developed at that time to establish Cinéfest as a year-round venue to showcase the best in film. In 2006, Cinéfest Sudbury introduced two new mini-festivals, Canadian Spotlight and Show & Tell Children's Film Showcase). These events are now providing audiences with even greater access to the works of Canadian film artists and are providing area schools with educational and inspirational film works that meet the needs of each curriculum.

=== Cinema Summit ===
In 2010, Cinéfest Sudbury introduced The Cinema Summit, a presentation, exchange and development series devoted to the celebration, promotion and advancement of Canada's new and emerging filmmaking talent. Aside from expanding the number of film screenings attended by talent associated with selected films, Cinema Summit features additional panel discussions, master classes and lectures with specific topics of focus, and introduces attendees to experts in the film and media arts industries. Cinema Summit represents Cinéfest's next efforts to inspire audiences, talent, students and industry.

=== Cinéfest Sudbury Film Series ===
In 2010, Cinéfest Sudbury further expanded its year-round presence by introducing the Cinéfest Sudbury Film Series, a monthly film presentation series typically held on the last Thursday of each month, featuring the best in Canadian and international cinema. The Cinéfest Sudbury Film Series has since been discontinued.

=== Cinéfest Sudbury International Film Festival Collection ===
The Greater Sudbury Public Library maintains a dedicated "Cinéfest Collection", featuring DVDs of over 200 films that have previously screened at the festival.

=== Cinéfest Sudbury Red Carpet Patron Program ===
At the end of 2021, Cinéfest Sudbury introduced the Red Carpet Patron Program, a subscription-based program for dedicated festival fans to keep the spirit of Cinéfest alive all year long. The program initially presented four exclusive films throughout the year but, due to popular demand and praise, has since expanded to provide registered Red Carpet Patrons with complimentary popcorn and access to six exclusive films throughout the year.

== Programming ==
Cinéfest currently boasts a nine-day repertoire of film programming for local, national and international guests. Its lineup often includes a selection of prominent international films which may have screened at TIFF just a week or two earlier, but also places a greater emphasis on both commercial and independent Canadian films. In 2021, when Michael McGowan attended the festival to screen All My Puny Sorrows, he praised Cinéfest's dedication to Canadian film, noting that it was the only film festival that had screened every single film he had ever made in his career.

Due to the Sudbury region's significant Franco-Ontarian population, the festival also programs a significant selection of French-language films from both Quebec and France. In recent years, the festival has also programmed a dedicated Cinema Indigenized stream of Indigenous Canadian films, and as the region is also a significant centre of Finnish Canadian settlement, the festival frequently tries to ensure that at least one film from Finland is also present in each year's lineup.

The festival is sometimes the world premiere venue for films that were produced or shot within Northern Ontario.

Cinéfest also includes a Best in Shorts competition, sponsored by CTV Northern Ontario, for student and emerging filmmakers from Northern Ontario. Films are entered in one of three categories, Open, Student or Northern Flicks, and are screened at a dedicated event during the festival, with the winners and runners-up in each category awarded cash prizes of $500, $750 or $1,250 depending on the category. Best in Shorts was suspended during the COVID-19 pandemic, but returned in 2023.

In 2026 the festival introduced the new Desjardins After Dark section, highlighting horror and genre films in a manner similar to TIFF's Midnight Madness lineup.

Unlike the larger Toronto festival, which often gives each film several screenings over the length of its program including private press and industry screenings, films at Cinéfest are almost always screened just once each. Accordingly, its awards are typically announced a few days after the end of the festival, rather than on closing day as at TIFF, so that films scheduled for late in the festival calendar are not excluded from award consideration.

== Awards ==
=== 1990 ===
- Best Canadian Film Award: An Imaginary Tale (Une histoire inventée), André Forcier
- Best International Film Award: The Nasty Girl, Michael Verhoeven

=== 1991 ===
- Best Canadian Film Award: The Adjuster, Atom Egoyan
- Best Ontario Feature: The Adjuster, Atom Egoyan
- Best International Film Award: A Mere Mortal (Simple mortel), Pierre Jolivet

=== 1992 ===
- Best Canadian Film Award: Careful, Guy Maddin
- Best International Film Award: Like Water for Chocolate, Alfonso Arau
- Best Ontario Film: The Twist, Ron Mann

=== 1993 ===
- Best Canadian Film Award: Zero Patience, John Greyson
- Best International Film Award: Naked, Mike Leigh
- Best Ontario Film: Zero Patience, John Greyson

=== 1994 ===
- Best Canadian Film Award: Exotica, Atom Egoyan
- Best International Film Award: Caro diario, Nanni Moretti
- Best Ontario Film: Picture of Light, Peter Mettler

=== 1995 ===
- Best Canadian Film Award: The Confessional (Le Confessionnal), Robert Lepage
- Best International Film Award: The White Balloon, Jafar Panahi
- Best Ontario Film: Rude, Clement Virgo

=== 1996 ===
- Audience Choice Award: The Eighth Day (Le huitième jour), Jaco Van Dormael
- Best Canadian Film Award: Hard Core Logo, Bruce McDonald
- Best International Film Award: The Eighth Day (Le huitième jour), Jaco Van Dormael
- Best Ontario Film: Project Grizzly, Peter Lynch

=== 1997 ===
- Audience Choice Award: Ma vie en rose, Alain Berliner
- Best Canadian Film Award: The Hanging Garden, Thom Fitzgerald
- Best Canadian Short Film: Zie 37 Stagen, Sylvain Guy
- Best Ontario Feature: Cube, Vincenzo Natali

=== 1998 ===
- Audience Choice Award: Life is Beautiful, Roberto Benigni
- Best Canadian Film Award: Nô, Robert Lepage
- Best Canadian First Feature: Clutch, Chris Grismer
- Best Canadian Short: Moving Day, Chris Deacon
- Best Ontario Film: Last Night, Don McKellar

=== 1999 ===
- Audience Choice Award: Happy, Texas, Mark Illsley
- Best Canadian Film Award: New Waterford Girl, Allan Moyle
- Best Ontario Film: Just Watch Me: Trudeau and the '70s Generation, Catherine Annau

=== 2000 ===
- Audience Choice Award: The Luzhin Defence, Marleen Gorris
- Best Canadian Film: Two Thousand and None, Arto Paragamian
- Best Canadian First Feature: Parsley Days, Andrea Dorfman
- Best Ontario Film: Deeply, Sheri Elwood

=== 2001 ===
- Audience Choice Award: Amélie, Jean-Pierre Jeunet
- Best Canadian First Feature Film: A Passage to Ottawa, Gaurav Seth
- Best Ontario Film: Picture Claire, Bruce McDonald

=== 2002 ===
- Audience Choice Award: Bowling for Columbine, Michael Moore
- Best Canadian First Feature Film: Marion Bridge, Wiebke von Carolsfeld
- Best Ontario Film: Rub & Tug, Soo Lyu

=== 2003 ===
- Audience Choice Award: The Barbarian Invasions (Les Invasions barbares), Denys Arcand
- Best Canadian Film: The Barbarian Invasions (Les Invasions barbares), Denys Arcand
- Best Canadian First Feature: Hollywood North, Peter O'Brian
- Best Ontario Film: Falling Angels, Scott Smith

=== 2004 ===
- Audience Choice Award: The Sea Inside, Alejandro Amenabar
- Best Canadian Film: A Year in the Death of Jack Richards, B.P. Paquette

=== 2005 ===
- Audience Choice Award: Water, Deepa Mehta
- Best Canadian First Feature: A Simple Curve, Aubrey Nealon
- Best Ontario Film: Water, Deepa Mehta
- Best Canadian Short Film: Dry Whiskey, Robert Budreau and Philip Svoboda

=== 2006 ===
- Audience Choice Award: After the Wedding, Susanne Bier
- Best Canadian First Feature: Away from Her, Sarah Polley
- Best Ontario Film: Snow Cake, Marc Evans

=== 2007 ===
- Audience Choice Award: Shake Hands with the Devil, Roger Spottiswoode
- Best Canadian Film: Shake Hands with the Devil, Roger Spottiswoode

=== 2008 ===
- Audience Choice Award: Passchendaele, Paul Gross

=== 2009 ===
- Audience Choice Award: The Young Victoria, Jean-Marc Vallée
- Best Canadian Film: The Woman of Ahhs: A Self-Portrait by Victoria Fleming, B.P. Paquette
- Best Canadian First Feature: I Killed My Mother (J'ai tué ma mère), Xavier Dolan

=== 2010 ===
- Audience Choice Award: Incendies, Denis Villeneuve
- Best Canadian First Feature: Oliver Sherman, Ryan Redford
- Best Documentary: Force of Nature: The David Suzuki Movie, Sturla Gunnarsson
- Best in Shorts – First place, open category: Bedtime Stories by Ben Brumueller
- Best in Shorts – Second place, open category: Freshwater Plague by Jake Chirico
- Best in Shorts – Third place, open category: The Appointment by Katrina Saville
- Best in Shorts – Student category: Singing in the Brain by J.P. Bouchardt
- Best in Shorts – Northern Flicks Award: Never Been Kissed by Gina Simon
- Best Animation Award: Bedtime Stories by Ben Brumueller
- CTV Best Script Award: The Appointment by Katrina Saville

Gala presentations included Score: A Hockey Musical, You Will Meet a Tall Dark Stranger, Casino Jack, Made in Dagenham, Jack Goes Boating, The Bang Bang Club and Barney's Version.

=== 2011 ===
- Audience Choice Award: Cloudburst, Thom Fitzgerald
- National Film Board of Canada Carolyn Fouriezos Best Canadian Documentary Award: The Guantanamo Trap, Thomas Wallner
- Best in Shorts – First place, open category: The Standoff by John Alden Milne
- Best in Shorts – First place, student category: Shoes! by Ryan Ongaro
- Best in Shorts – Second place, student category: Ad Noctvm by Josh Herd
- Best in Shorts – Third place, student category: Introspection by Sam Desrosiers
- Northern Flicks Award: Sugaring by Ryan Mariotti
- Best Animation Award: Private Snuffy by Ben Sainsbury

Gala presentations: Restless, The Guard, I'm Yours, The Woman in the Fifth, Starbuck, Albert Nobbs, Donovan's Echo, Take This Waltz.

Special Presentations: Afghan Luke, Monsieur Lazhar, Sophie and Sheba, Midnight in Paris, Sleeping Beauty.

=== 2012 ===
- Audience Choice Award: In Return, Chris Dymond
- Best Short Film: Utopia?, Brent Godfrey and Ryan Ongaro
- Northern Flicks Award: Morning Zombies, Kevin Hoffman
- Best Animation Award: Reesor Siding, Paul Rodrigue
- Best in Shorts, Open Category: The Runner, John Alden Milne
- Best in Shorts, Student First Place: Utopia?, Brent Godfrey and Ryan Ongaro
- Best in Shorts, Student Second Place: Foxy Lady, Alek Bélanger
- Best in Shorts, Student Third Place: Closets, Vincent Deiulis

Gala Presentations: The Riverbank, The Angels' Share, A Dark Truth, Midnight's Children, A Royal Affair, Old Stock, Inch'Allah, Still Mine, A Late Quartet

Special Presentations: All in Good Time, Amour, Crooked Arrows, Foxfire: Confessions of a Girl Gang, The Hunt (Jagten), Inescapable, Laurence Anyways, Rust and Bone (De rouille et d'os), The Suicide Shop (Le Magasin des suicides), No, Revolution, Safety Not Guaranteed, Stories We Tell, War Witch (Rebelle)

=== 2013 ===
- Audience Choice Award: Gabrielle by Louise Archambault
- Best Canadian Feature Film Award: Gabrielle by Louise Archambault
- Best Foreign Feature Film Award: The Lunchbox [Dabba] by Ritesh Batra
- Best Canadian Independent Song in A Feature Film Award: Ariane Moffatt, "Too Late" from Sarah préfère la course
- Best Northern Ontario Feature Film Award: The Story of Luke by Alonso Mayo
- Best of Audience Choice Award – Audience Votes: Life is Beautiful, Roberto Benigni. This was a special all-time award presented to honour the most popular film in the history of the festival's Audience Choice award.

Gala Presentations: The Art of the Steal, The Invisible Woman, Cubicle Warriors, Kill Your Darlings, The Story of Luke, Parkland, Gabrielle, The Right Kind of Wrong, Cas & Dylan

Special Presentations: Adore, All Is Lost, The Armstrong Lie, Les beaux jours, The Face of Love, The Four Soldiers, Gloria, La grande bellezza, Jeune & Jolie, Shoshite chichi ni naru, Louis Cyr: L'homme le plus fort du monde, The Lunchbox [Dabba], Le passé, La vie d'Adele (chapitres 1 et 2)

=== 2014 ===
- Audience Choice Award: Elsa & Fred by Michael Radford
- Audience Choice Award Best Documentary: I Am Big Bird: The Caroll Spinney Story by Dave LaMattina and Chad N. Walker
- Audience Choice Award Best Short Film: Little Brother (Petit frère) by Rémi St-Michel
- Best in Shorts First Place, open category: Beautiful Monster by Callam Rodya
- Best in Shorts Runner Up, open category: Bullet-Headed by Zahra Golafshani
- Best in Shorts, student category: 2:00 by Martin Smith
- Best in Shorts Northern Flicks Award: Raising Hope: A Relay for Life Story by Paul W. Los and Nora Burns
- Best in Shorts Best Animation Award: Clarabel by Ben Bruhmuller

=== 2015 ===
- Audience Choice Award: Labyrinth of Lies by Giulio Ricciarelli
- Audience Choice Award Best Documentary: Meru by Jimmy Chin and Elizabeth Chai Vasarhelyi
- Audience Choice Award Best Short Film: Ron Taylor: Dr. Baseball by Drew Taylor and Matthew Taylor
- Best in Shorts, open category: Ordinary Miracle by Martin Smith
- Best in Shorts, open category runner-up: Down South by Shawn Kosmerly
- Best in Shorts, student category: Spree by Eric Harrison
- Best in Shorts, student category runner-up: The Maker by Alek Bélanger
- Best in Shorts Northern Flicks Award: Ordinary Miracle by Martin Smith
- Best in Shorts Innovation Award: Perceptions by Zahra Golafshani

=== 2016 ===
- Audience Choice Award: Maudie by Aisling Walsh
- Audience Choice Award Best Documentary: The Eagle Huntress by Otto Bell
- Audience Choice Award Best Short Film: The Orchard by Darcy Van Poelgeest
- Best in Shorts, open category: Camani by Dale Carrigan
- Runner-up, Shorts, open category: Movin' On by Shawn Kosmerly
- Best in Shorts, student category: This Is Fine by George Bull
- Runner-up, Shorts, student category: Broken by Sheri Shweyer
- Best in Shorts Northern Flicks Award: Camani by Dale Carrigan

Gala presentations: Maudie, Manchester by the Sea, Chocolat, Denial, The Headhunter's Calling, Toni Erdmann, Mean Dreams, I, Daniel Blake, The Dressmaker.

=== 2017 ===
Gala presentations: Back to Burgundy (Ce qui nous lie), Borg/McEnroe, Breathe, Call Me By Your Name, Don't Talk to Irene, Indian Horse, Long Time Running, Mary Shelley, Stronger.

- Audience Choice Award: Loving Vincent by Dorota Kobiela and Hugh Welchman
- Audience Choice Award Best Documentary: Everyday Heroes (Et les mistrals gagnants) by Anne-Dauphine Julliand
- Audience Choice Award Best Short Film: Fix and Release by Scott Dobson
- Best in Shorts, open category: Farewell Fire by Scott Armstrong
- Runner-up, Shorts, open category: Future Sick by Aaron Martini
- Best in Shorts, student category: Future Sick by Aaron Martini
- Runner-up, Shorts, student category: Versa: This is Where We Disappear, Aaron Martini
- Best in Shorts Northern Flicks Award: Farewell Fire by Scott Armstrong

=== 2018 ===
Gala presentations: 1991, Bel Canto, Colette, The Grizzlies, The New Romantic, Sharkwater Extinction, The Sisters Brothers, Through Black Spruce, What They Had

- Best Feature Film: The Guilty, Gustav Möller
- Best Documentary: You Are Here, Moze Mossanen
- Best Short Film: Animal Behaviour, Alison Snowden and David Fine

=== 2019 ===
Gala presentations: American Woman, And the Birds Rained Down (Il pleuvait des oiseaux), La Belle Époque, The Farewell, Guest of Honour, Judy, The Last Full Measure, The Rest of Us, The Song of Names

- Audience Choice Award: Judy, Rupert Goold
- Audience Choice Award, Runner-Up: By the Grace of God (Grâce à Dieu), François Ozon
- Audience Choice Award, Documentary: Sea of Shadows, Richard Ladkan
- Audience Choice Award, Documentary Runner-Up: The Secret Marathon, Kate McKenzie and Scott Townend
- Audience Choice Award, Short Film: The Depths (Les profondeurs), Ariane Louis-Seize
- Audience Choice Award, Short Film Runner-Up: Unidentified Woman, Katrina Saville

=== 2020 ===
Due to the ongoing COVID-19 pandemic in Canada, organizers announced that the 2020 Cinéfest would proceed with a mix of in-person and online screenings, similarly to the 2020 Toronto International Film Festival.

Gala presentations for the festival were Ammonite, Girl, My Salinger Year, Nadia, Butterfly, The Nest, Nine Days, Percy and The Rose Maker (La fine fleur).

=== 2021 ===
The 2021 festival was again presented under a hybrid model, with both in-person and online screenings. The festival also introduced a number of juried film awards, following several years of only presenting audience choice-based awards; the new awards program includes cash prizes for Outstanding Canadian Feature, Outstanding International Feature, Outstanding Female-Led Feature, Cinema Indigenized Outstanding Talent, French-Language Feature, Inspiring Voices and Perspectives Feature, Outstanding Short, Outstanding Emerging Canadian Short, and Outstanding Animated Short.

Gala presentations included All My Puny Sorrows, The Electrical Life of Louis Wain, Official Competition (Competencia oficial), Falling for Figaro, Juniper, The Vinland Club (Le club vinland), Lakewood, Night Raiders, One Second (一秒钟), and The Card Counter.

=== 2022 ===
Gala presentations included Alice, Darling, Ashgrove, Beautiful Minds (Presque), Broker (브로커), Call Jane, North of Normal, The Return of Tanya Tucker: Featuring Brandi Carlisle, The Swearing Jar and Viking.

=== 2023 ===
The 2023 festival returned to a fully in-person model, following the partially-online hybrid festivals that took place from 2020 to 2022 during the COVID-19 pandemic.

The gala lineup consisted of Swan Song, The Unlikely Pilgrimage of Harold Fry, My Mother's Men (Les Hommes de ma mère), Sweetland, La Chimera, The Old Oak, The Boy in the Woods, Close to You and Humanist Vampire Seeking Consenting Suicidal Person (Vampire humaniste cherche suicidaire consentant).

=== 2024 ===
The gala presentations were 1995, Bob Trevino Likes It, Bookworm, The Count of Monte Cristo (Le Comte de Monte Cristo), Drive Back Home, The Invisibles, The Mother and the Bear, The Outrun and Young Werther.
